= Delaware gubernatorial elections =

A table showing the results of general elections for the Governor of Delaware, beginning in 1792 when the Delaware Constitution of 1792 went into effect, providing for the popular election of Governors.

The Governor serves as head of the executive branch of the state's government. Beginning in 1792, the Governor was popularly elected, at first for a three-year term, changing to a four-year term in 1831. Elections were held the first Tuesday in October until 1831, when they were changed to the first Tuesday after November 1.

== Governors of Delaware ==
Year	Elected	Party	Votes	%	Opponent	Party	Votes	%	Notes
1792	Joshua Clayton*	Federalist	2,209	48%	Thomas Montgomery	Republican	1,902	42%	(Note: An additional candidate was George Mitchell (458).)
1795	Gunning Bedford Sr.	Federalist	2,352	52%	Archibald Alexander	Republican	2,142	48%	
1798	Richard Bassett	Federalist	2,490	53%	David Hall	Republican	2,068	44%	(Note: An additional candidate was Barclay Townsend (185).)
1801	David Hall	Republican	3,475	50%	Nathaniel Mitchell	Federalist	3,457	50%	
1804	Nathaniel Mitchell	Federalist	4,391	52%	Joseph Haslet	Republican	4,050	48%	
1807	George Truitt	Federalist	3,309	52%	Joseph Haslet	Republican	3,062	48%	
1810	Joseph Haslet	Republican	3,664	50%	Daniel Rodney	Federalist	3,593	50%	
1813	Daniel Rodney	Federalist	4,643	55%	James Riddle	Republican	3,768	45%	
1816	John Clark	Federalist	4,008	53%	Manaen Bull	Republican	3,517	47%	
1819	Henry Molleston	Federalist	3,823	55%	Manaen Bull	Republican	3,185	45%	
1820	John Collins	Republican	3,970	53%	Jesse Green	Federalist	3,520	47%	(Note: This was a special election held on October 3, 1820, to fill the vacancy caused by the death of Henry Molleston.)
1822	Joseph Haslet	Republican	3,784	50%	James Booth	Federalist	3,762	50%	
1823	Samuel Paynter	Federalist	4,348	52%	David Hazzard	Republican	4,051	48%	(Note: This was a special election held on October 7, 1823, to fill the vacancy caused by the death of Joseph Haslet.)
1826	Charles Polk Jr.	Federalist	4,333	51%	David Hazzard	Republican	4,238	49%	
1829	David Hazzard	National Republican	4,215	51%	Allen Thompson	Democratic	4,046	49%	
1832	Caleb P. Bennett	Democratic	4,220	50%	Arnold Naudain	Whig	4,166	50%	
1836	Cornelius P. Comegys	Whig	4,693	52%	Nehemiah Clark	Democratic	4,276	48%	
1840	William B. Cooper	Whig	5,850	54%	Warren Jefferson	Democratic	5,024	46%	
1844	Thomas Stockton	Whig	6,140	50%	William Tharp	Democratic	6,095	50%	
1846	William Tharp	Democratic	6,148	51%	Peter F. Causey	Whig	6,012	49%	
1850	William H. H. Ross	Democratic	6,001	48%	Peter F. Causey	Whig	5,978	48%	(Note: An additional candidate was Thomas Lockwood (456).)
1854	Peter F. Causey	American	6,941	53%	William Burton	Democratic	6,244	47%	
1858	William Burton	Democratic	7,758	53%	James S. Buckmaster	People's	7,554	47%	
1862	William Cannon	Republican	8,155	50%	Samuel Jefferson	Democratic	8,044	50%	
1866	Gove Saulsbury*	Democratic	9,810	53%	James Riddle	Republican	8,598	47%	
1870	James Ponder	Democratic	11,464	56%	Thomas B. Coursey	Republican	9,130	44%	
1874	John P. Cochran	Democratic	12,488	53%	Isaac Jump	Republican	11,259	47%	
1878	John W. Hall	Democratic	10,730	79%	Kensey J. Stewart	Greenback	2,835	21%	
1882	Charles C. Stockley	Democratic	16,558	53%	Albert Curry	Republican	14,620	47%	
1886	Benjamin T. Biggs	Democratic	13,942	64%	John H. Hoffecker	Temperance Reform	7,835	36%	
1890	Robert J. Reynolds	Democratic	17,801	50%	Harry A. Richardson	Republican	17,258	49%	
1894	Joshua H. Marvil	Republican	19,880	51%	Ebe W. Tunnell	Democratic	18,659	48%	
1896	Ebe W. Tunnell	Democratic	15,507	44%	John H. Hoffecker	Republican	11,014	31%	(Note: An additional candidate was John C. Higgins (7,154).)
1900	John Hunn	Republican	22,421	54%	Peter J. Ford	Democratic	18,808	45%	
1904	Preston Lea	Republican	22,532	51%	Caleb S. Pennewill	Democratic	19,780	45%	(Note: Regular Republican candidate Joseph H. Chandler received 802 votes (2%)..)
1908	Simeon S. Pennewill	Republican	24,905	52%	Rowland G. Paynter	Democratic	22,794	48%	
1912	Charles R. Miller	Republican	22,745	47%	Thomas M. Monaghan	Democratic	21,460	44%	(Note: Additional candidates included George B. Hynson (3,019).)
1916	John G. Townsend Jr.	Republican	26,664	52%	James H. Hughes	Democratic	24,053	47%	
1920	William D. Denney	Republican	51,895	56%	Andrew J. Lynch	Democratic	41,038	43%	
1924	Robert P. Robinson	Republican	53,046	59%	Joseph Bancroft	Democratic	34,830	40%	
1928	C. Douglass Buck	Republican	63,716	61%	Charles M. Wharton	Democratic	40,346	39%	
1932	C. Douglass Buck*	Republican	60,903	54%	Landreth L. Layton	Democratic	50,401	45%	
1936	Richard McMullen	Democratic	65,437	50%	Harry L. Cannon	Republican	52,782	43%	(Note: Additional candidates included Isaac D. Short (8,400).)
1940	Walter W. Bacon	Republican	70,909	52%	Josiah Marvel Jr.	Democratic	61,237	45%	(Note: Liberal Democratic candidate Ivan Culbertson received 2,975 votes (2%).)
1944	Walter W. Bacon*	Republican	63,829	51%	Isaac J. MacCollum	Democratic	62,156	49%	
1948	Elbert N. Carvel	Democratic	75,339	54%	Hyland P. George	Republican	64,996	46%	
1952	J. Caleb Boggs	Republican	88,977	52%	Elbert N. Carvel*	Democratic	81,772	48%	
1956	J. Caleb Boggs*	Republican	91,965	52%	J. H.Tyler McConnell	Democratic	85,047	48%	
1960	Elbert N. Carvel	Democratic	100,792	52%	John W. Rollins	Republican	94,043	48%	
1964	Charles L. Terry Jr.	Democratic	102,797	51%	David P. Buckson	Republican	97,374	49%	
1968	Russell W. Peterson	Republican	104,474	51%	Charles L. Terry Jr.*	Democratic	102,360	49%	
1972	Sherman W. Tribbitt	Democratic	117,274	51%	Russell W. Peterson*	Republican	109,583	48%	(Note: Additional candidates were Virginia M. Lyndall (1,468) and Harry H. Conner (397).)
1976	Pete du Pont	Republican	130,531	57%	Sherman W. Tribbitt*	Democratic	97,480	42%	
1980	Pete du Pont*	Republican	159,004	71%	William J. Gordy	Democratic	64,217	29%	(Note: An additional candidate was Lawrence Levy.)
1984	Mike Castle	Republican	135,250	56%	William T. Quillen	Democratic	108,315	44%	
1988	Mike Castle*	Republican	169,733	71%	Jacob Kreshtool	Democratic	70,236	29%	
1992	Tom Carper	Democratic	179,268	65%	B. Gary Scott	Republican	90,747	33%	(Note: Additional candidates were Floyd E. McDowell Sr. and Richard A. Cohen.)
1996	Tom Carper*	Democratic	188,300	70%	Janet Rzewnicki	Republican	82,654	30%	
2000	Ruth Ann Minner	Democratic	191,695	59%	John M. Burris	Republican	128,603	40%	(Note: An additional candidate was Floyd E. McDowell Sr. (3,271).)
2004	Ruth Ann Minner*	Democratic	185,687	51%	Bill Lee	Republican	167,115	46%	(Note: An additional candidate was Frank Infante (12,206).)
2008	Jack Markell	Democratic	266,861	68%	Bill Lee	Republican	126,662	32%	(Note: An additional candidate was Jeffrey Brown (1,681).)
2012	Jack Markell*	Democratic	275,991	69%	Jeff Cragg	Republican	113,792	29%	(Note: Additional candidates were Mark Perri (Green Party, 4,575) and Jesse McVay (Libertarian, 3,668).)
2016	John Carney	Democratic	248,404	58%	Colin Bonini	Republican	166,852	39%	(Note: Additional candidates were Andrew R. Groff (Green, 5,951) and Sean L. Groward (Libertarian, 4,577).)
2020	John Carney*	Democratic	292,903	59%	Julianne Murray	Republican	190,312	39%	(Note: Additional candidates were Kathy DeMatteis (Delaware Independent, 6,150) and John Machurek (Libertarian, 3,270).)
2024	Matt Meyer	Democratic	279,585	56%	Mike Ramone	Republican	219,050	44%	
