= List of governors of Delaware =

Governor of Delaware
- Great Seal of the State of Delaware

- Incumbent; Matt Meyer since January 21, 2025
- Government of Delaware
- Style: The Honorable
- Residence: Delaware Governor's Mansion; Dover, Delaware
- Term length: Four years, renewable once
- Inaugural holder: John McKinly
- Formation: February 12, 1777
- Succession: Line of succession
- Deputy: Lieutenant Governor of Delaware
- Salary: $171,000 (2022)
- Website: governor.delaware.gov

The Governor of Delaware (known as the President of Delaware from 1776 to 1792) is the head of government of Delaware and the commander-in-chief of the state's military forces. The governor has a duty to enforce state laws, and the power to either approve or veto bills passed by the Delaware Legislature, to convene the legislature, and to grant pardons, except in cases of impeachment, and only with the recommendation of the Board of Pardons.

There have been 71 people who have served as governor, over 74 distinct terms. Three (Joseph Haslet, Charles Polk Jr. and Elbert N. Carvel) served non-consecutive terms. Additionally, Henry Molleston was elected, but died before he could take office. Only four governors have been elected to two consecutive terms, with the longest-serving being Ruth Ann Minner, who was elected twice after succeeding to the office, serving a total of just over eight years. The shortest term is that of Bethany Hall-Long, who served 15 days following her predecessor's resignation; Dale E. Wolf served 18 days and David P. Buckson served 19 days under similar circumstances. The current governor is Democrat Matt Meyer, who took office on January 21, 2025.

== Governors ==
Before 1776, Delaware was a colony of the Kingdom of Great Britain, administered by colonial governors in Pennsylvania as the "Lower Counties on Delaware".

In 1776, soon after Delaware and the rest of the Thirteen Colonies declared independence from Britain, the state adopted its first state constitution. It created the office of President of Delaware, a chief executive to be chosen by the legislature to serve a term of three years, who would be ineligible to be president again until three years had passed after leaving office.

The office of President was renamed Governor by the constitution of 1792, which set the commencement date of the term to the third Tuesday in the January following an election, and limited governors to serving only three out of any six years. The term was lengthened to four years by the 1831 constitution, but governors were limited to a single term. The current constitution of 1897 allows governors to serve two terms.

The 1776 constitution stated that if the presidency were vacant, the speaker of the legislative council would be a vice-president. The 1792 constitution had the speaker of the senate exercising the office when it is vacant, and the 1897 constitution created the office of lieutenant governor, upon whom the office devolves in case of vacancy. The offices of governor and lieutenant governor are elected at the same time but not on the same ticket.

Governors of the State of Delaware
No. (Note: The official website labeled John Carney as the 74th governor; this indicates that repeat, non-consecutive terms are numbered.)	Governor (Note: The office was named president in 1776 and renamed governor in 1792.)	Term in office	Party	Election	Lt. Governor (Note: The office of lieutenant governor was created in 1897, with the first election taking place in 1900.) (Note: Lieutenant governors represented the same party as their governor unless noted.)
1	John McKinly (1721–1796)	February 21, 1777 – September 12, 1777 (Note: Most sources do not specify the day McKinly was captured; at least one specifies that McKinly and the city of Wilmington were captured the day after the Battle of Brandywine, which was on September 11, 1777.) (204 days; arrested and removed) (Note: McKinly was captured and taken prisoner by British forces. He was exchanged for loyalist Governor William Franklin of New Jersey in August 1778.)	No parties	1777	Office did not exist
2	Thomas McKean (1734–1817)	September 12, 1777 – October 20, 1777 (39 days; retired)	No parties	Speaker of the Assembly acting as vice-president (Note: Speaker of the Assembly McKean acted as chief executive until the return of speaker of the Legislative Council Read from the Continental Congress in Philadelphia, who then served as vice-president for the remainder of the term.)	Office did not exist
3	George Read (1733–1798)	October 20, 1777 – March 31, 1778 (163 days; retired)	No parties	Speaker of the Legislative; Council serving as vice-president	Office did not exist
4	Caesar Rodney (1728–1784)	March 31, 1778 – November 13, 1781 (Note: Kallenbach has Rodney leaving office on November 5, with a gap until Dickinson takes office, with no reason given.) (1324 days; term-limited) (Note: Under the 1776 constitution, presidents were ineligible to the office until three years had passed after leaving it.)	No parties	1778	Office did not exist
5	John Dickinson (1732–1808)	November 13, 1781 (Note: Sources disagree on when Dickinson took office; the proceedings of the assembly, published in 1988, says his inaugural address was delivered November 13; the governor's register, published in 1926, says he was elected on November 13 and inaugurated on November 14.) – January 13, 1783 (427 days; resigned) (Note: Dickinson was elected President of Pennsylvania and took office November 7, 1782, holding both presidencies simultaneously. Criticism of this caused him to turn administration of the state over to Speaker of the Legislative Council Cook, but Dickinson did not formally resign until January 13, 1783.)	No parties	1781	Office did not exist
6	John Cook (1730–1789)	January 13, 1783 – February 8, 1783 (27 days; retired)	No parties	Speaker of the Legislative; Council serving as vice-president	Office did not exist
7	Nicholas Van Dyke (1738–1789)	February 8, 1783 – October 28, 1786 (1359 days; term-limited)	No parties	1783 (special)	Office did not exist
8	Thomas Collins (1732–1789)	October 28, 1786 – March 29, 1789 (884 days; died in office)	No parties	1786	Office did not exist
9	Jehu Davis (1738–1802)	March 29, 1789 – June 2, 1789 (66 days; retired)	No parties	Speaker of the Legislative; Council serving as vice-president	Office did not exist
10	Joshua Clayton (1744–1798)	June 2, 1789 – January 13, 1796 (2417 days; term-limited) (Note: Clayton's first term was as president, so he was eligible to run for a term as governor, and was then term-limited. (Note: Under the 1792 constitution, governors could serve no longer than three in any term of six years.))	Federalist	1789	Office did not exist
10	Joshua Clayton (1744–1798)	June 2, 1789 – January 13, 1796 (2417 days; term-limited)	Federalist	1792	Office did not exist
11	Gunning Bedford Sr. (1742–1797)	January 13, 1796 – September 28, 1797 (625 days; died in office) (Note: Sources disagree on if Bedford died on September 28 or September 30, sometimes within the same source.)	Federalist	1795	Office did not exist
12	Daniel Rogers (1754–1806)	September 28, 1797 – January 9, 1799 (469 days; retired)	Federalist	Speaker of the Senate acting	Office did not exist
13	Richard Bassett (1745–1815)	January 9, 1799 (Note: The constitutional start date for the term in 1799 was January 15; multiple sources say Bassett took office January 9, but it is not known why it was off schedule. A few sources do say he took office January 15.) – March 3, 1801 (784 days; resigned) (Note: Bassett resigned, having been confirmed to the United States Third Circuit Court.)	Federalist	1798	Office did not exist
14	James Sykes (1761–1822)	March 3, 1801 – January 19, 1802 (323 days; retired)	Federalist	Speaker of the Senate acting	Office did not exist
15	David Hall (1752–1817)	January 19, 1802 – January 15, 1805 (1093 days; term-limited)	Democratic- Republican	1801	Office did not exist
16	Nathaniel Mitchell (1753–1814)	January 15, 1805 – January 19, 1808 (1100 days; term-limited)	Federalist	1804	Office did not exist
17	George Truitt (1756–1818)	January 19, 1808 – January 15, 1811 (1093 days; term-limited)	Federalist	1807	Office did not exist
18	Joseph Haslet (1769–1823)	January 15, 1811 – January 18, 1814 (1100 days; term-limited)	Democratic- Republican	1810	Office did not exist
19	Daniel Rodney (1764–1846)	January 18, 1814 – January 21, 1817 (1100 days; term-limited)	Federalist	1813	Office did not exist
20	John Clark (1761–1821)	January 21, 1817 – January 15, 1820 (1090 days; resigned) (Note: Due to the death of Governor-elect Molleston, there was some question as to who should take office when Clark's term ended. To minimize any confusion, Clark resigned a few days ahead of schedule, and the newly elected state senate chose a speaker, John Stout, who would act as governor for one year of Molleston's term before a special election was held for the remaining two years.)	Federalist	1816	Office did not exist
—	Henry Molleston (1762–1819)	Died before taking office	Federalist	1819	Office did not exist
21	Jacob Stout (1764–1855)	January 15, 1820 – January 16, 1821 (368 days; retired)	Federalist	Speaker of the Senate acting	Office did not exist
22	John Collins (1776–1822)	January 16, 1821 – April 16, 1822 (456 days; died in office)	Democratic- Republican	1820 (special) (Note: Special election to serve out the last two years of Henry Molleston's term)	Office did not exist
23	Caleb Rodney (1767–1840)	April 16, 1822 (Note: Rodney was formally sworn in on April 23.) – January 21, 1823 (218 days; retired)	Federalist	Speaker of the Senate acting	Office did not exist
24	Joseph Haslet (1769–1823)	January 21, 1823 (Note: The governor's register has Haslet being inaugurated on January 22, but it specifies the third Tuesday in January, which in 1823 was the 21st.) – June 20, 1823 (151 days; died in office)	Democratic- Republican	1822	Office did not exist
25	Charles Thomas (1790–1848)	June 20, 1823 (Note: Thomas was formally sworn in on June 24.) – January 20, 1824 (215 days; retired)	Democratic- Republican	Speaker of the Senate acting	Office did not exist
26	Samuel Paynter (1768–1845)	January 20, 1824 – January 16, 1827 (1093 days; term-limited)	Federalist	1823 (special) (Note: Because of the death of Haslet so early in his term, an early election was called. Unlike when Henry Molleston died, where the election was only for the final two years of his term, in this case the new election was for a new three-year term, causing the election schedule to shift.)	Office did not exist
27	Charles Polk Jr. (1788–1857)	January 16, 1827 – January 19, 1830 (1100 days; term-limited)	Federalist	1826	Office did not exist
28	David Hazzard (1781–1864)	January 19, 1830 – January 15, 1833 (1093 days; term-limited) (Note: Under the 1831 constitution, governors were not eligible a second time to the office.)	National; Republican	1829	Office did not exist
29	Caleb P. Bennett (1758–1836)	January 15, 1833 – May 9, 1836 (1211 days; died in office)	Democratic	1832 (Note: First term under the 1831 constitution, which lengthened terms to four years.)	Office did not exist
30	Charles Polk Jr. (1788–1857)	May 9, 1836 – January 17, 1837 (254 days; retired)	Whig	Speaker of the Senate acting	Office did not exist
31	Cornelius P. Comegys (1780–1851)	January 17, 1837 – January 19, 1841 (1464 days; term-limited)	Whig	1836	Office did not exist
32	William B. Cooper (1771–1849)	January 19, 1841 – January 21, 1845 (1464 days; term-limited)	Whig	1840	Office did not exist
33	Thomas Stockton (1781–1846)	January 21, 1845 – March 2, 1846 (406 days; died in office)	Whig	1844	Office did not exist
34	Joseph Maull (1781–1846)	March 2, 1846 – May 3, 1846 (63 days; died in office)	Whig	Speaker of the Senate acting	Office did not exist
35	William Temple (1814–1863)	May 3, 1846 (Note: Temple was formally sworn in on May 6.) – January 19, 1847 (262 days; retired)	Whig	Speaker of the Senate acting	Office did not exist
36	William Tharp (1803–1865)	January 19, 1847 – January 21, 1851 (1464 days; term-limited)	Democratic	1846 (special) (Note: Special election called due to the deaths of Stockton and Maull, causing a shift in the election schedule.)	Office did not exist
37	William H. H. Ross (1814–1887)	January 21, 1851 – January 16, 1855 (1457 days; term-limited)	Democratic	1850	Office did not exist
38	Peter F. Causey (1801–1871)	January 16, 1855 – January 18, 1859 (1464 days; term-limited)	American	1854	Office did not exist
39	William Burton (1789–1866)	January 18, 1859 – January 20, 1863 (1464 days; term-limited)	Democratic	1858	Office did not exist
40	William Cannon (1809–1865)	January 20, 1863 – March 1, 1865 (772 days; died in office)	Union	1862	Office did not exist
41	Gove Saulsbury (1815–1881)	March 1, 1865 – January 17, 1871 (2149 days; term-limited)	Democratic	Speaker of the Senate acting	Office did not exist
41	Gove Saulsbury (1815–1881)	March 1, 1865 – January 17, 1871 (2149 days; term-limited)	Democratic	1866	Office did not exist
42	James Ponder (1819–1897)	January 17, 1871 – January 19, 1875 (1464 days; term-limited)	Democratic	1870	Office did not exist
43	John P. Cochran (1809–1898)	January 19, 1875 – January 21, 1879 (1464 days; term-limited)	Democratic	1874	Office did not exist
44	John W. Hall (1817–1892)	January 21, 1879 – January 16, 1883 (1457 days; term-limited)	Democratic	1878	Office did not exist
45	Charles C. Stockley (1819–1901)	January 16, 1883 – January 18, 1887 (1464 days; term-limited)	Democratic	1882	Office did not exist
46	Benjamin T. Biggs (1821–1893)	January 18, 1887 – January 20, 1891 (1464 days; term-limited)	Democratic	1886	Office did not exist
47	Robert J. Reynolds (1838–1909)	January 20, 1891 – January 15, 1895 (1457 days; term-limited)	Democratic	1890	Office did not exist
48	Joshua H. Marvil (1825–1895)	January 15, 1895 – April 8, 1895 (84 days; died in office)	Republican	1894	Office did not exist
49	William T. Watson (1849–1917)	April 8, 1895 – January 19, 1897 (653 days; retired)	Democratic	Speaker of the Senate acting	Office did not exist
50	Ebe W. Tunnell (1844–1917)	January 19, 1897 – January 15, 1901 (1457 days; retired)	Democratic	1896 (Note: Because Marvil died so early in his term, the General Assembly decided to conduct an election for a full term in 1896, changing the election schedule.)	Office did not exist
51	John Hunn (1849–1926)	January 15, 1901 – January 17, 1905 (1464 days; retired)	Republican	1900	Philip L. Cannon
52	Preston Lea (1841–1916)	January 17, 1905 – January 19, 1909 (1464 days; retired)	Republican	1904	Isaac T. Parker
53	Simeon S. Pennewill (1867–1935)	January 19, 1909 – January 21, 1913 (1464 days; retired)	Republican	1908	John M. Mendinhall
54	Charles R. Miller (1857–1927)	January 21, 1913 – January 16, 1917 (1457 days; retired)	Republican	1912	Colen Ferguson (Note: Represented the Democratic Party)
55	John G. Townsend Jr. (1871–1964)	January 16, 1917 – January 18, 1921 (1464 days; retired)	Republican	1916	Lewis E. Eliason
56	William D. Denney (1873–1953)	January 18, 1921 – January 20, 1925 (1464 days; retired)	Republican	1920	J. Danforth Bush
57	Robert P. Robinson (1869–1939)	January 20, 1925 – January 15, 1929 (1457 days; retired)	Republican	1924	James H. Anderson
58	C. Douglass Buck (1890–1965)	January 15, 1929 – January 19, 1937 (2927 days; term-limited) (Note: Under the 1897 constitution, governors are not eligible a third time to the office.)	Republican	1928	James H. Hazel
58	C. Douglass Buck (1890–1965)	January 15, 1929 – January 19, 1937 (2927 days; term-limited)	Republican	1932	Roy F. Corley
59	Richard McMullen (1868–1944)	January 19, 1937 – January 21, 1941 (1464 days; retired)	Democratic	1936	Edward W. Cooch
60	Walter W. Bacon (1880–1962)	January 21, 1941 – January 18, 1949 (2920 days; term-limited)	Republican	1940	Isaac J. MacCollum
60	Walter W. Bacon (1880–1962)	January 21, 1941 – January 18, 1949 (2920 days; term-limited)	Republican	1944	Elbert N. Carvel
61	Elbert N. Carvel (1910–2005)	January 18, 1949 – January 20, 1953 (1464 days; lost election)	Democratic	1948	Alexis I. du Pont Bayard
62	J. Caleb Boggs (1909–1993)	January 20, 1953 – December 30, 1960 (2902 days; resigned) (Note: Boggs resigned, having been elected to the United States Senate.)	Republican	1952	John W. Rollins
62	J. Caleb Boggs (1909–1993)	January 20, 1953 – December 30, 1960 (2902 days; resigned)	Republican	1956	David P. Buckson
63	David P. Buckson (1920–2017)	December 30, 1960 – January 17, 1961 (19 days; retired)	Republican	Succeeded from lieutenant governor	Vacant
64	Elbert N. Carvel (1910–2005)	January 17, 1961 – January 19, 1965 (1464 days; term-limited)	Democratic	1960	Eugene Lammot
65	Charles L. Terry Jr. (1900–1970)	January 19, 1965 – January 21, 1969 (1464 days; lost election)	Democratic	1964	Sherman W. Tribbitt
66	Russell W. Peterson (1916–2011)	January 21, 1969 – January 16, 1973 (1457 days; lost election)	Republican	1968	Eugene Bookhammer (Note: Represented the Republican Party)
67	Sherman W. Tribbitt (1922–2010)	January 16, 1973 – January 18, 1977 (1464 days; lost election)	Democratic	1972	Eugene Bookhammer
68	Pete du Pont (1935–2021)	January 18, 1977 – January 15, 1985 (2920 days; term-limited)	Republican	1976	James D. McGinnis
68	Pete du Pont (1935–2021)	January 18, 1977 – January 15, 1985 (2920 days; term-limited)	Republican	1980	Mike Castle
69	Mike Castle (1939–2025)	January 15, 1985 – January 2, 1993 (2910 days; resigned) (Note: Castle resigned, having been elected to the United States House of Representatives.)	Republican	1984	S. B. Woo
69	Mike Castle (1939–2025)	January 15, 1985 – January 2, 1993 (2910 days; resigned)	Republican	1988	Dale E. Wolf
70	Dale E. Wolf (1924–2021)	January 3, 1993 (Note: Wolf was sworn in just after midnight.) – January 19, 1993 (17 days; retired)	Republican	Succeeded from lieutenant governor	Vacant
71	Tom Carper (b. 1947)	January 19, 1993 – January 3, 2001 (2907 days; resigned) (Note: Carper resigned, having been elected to the United States Senate.)	Democratic	1992	Ruth Ann Minner
71	Tom Carper (b. 1947)	January 19, 1993 – January 3, 2001 (2907 days; resigned)	Democratic	1996	Ruth Ann Minner
72	Ruth Ann Minner (1935–2021)	January 3, 2001 – January 20, 2009 (2940 days; term-limited)	Democratic	Succeeded from lieutenant governor	Vacant
72	Ruth Ann Minner (1935–2021)	January 3, 2001 – January 20, 2009 (2940 days; term-limited)	Democratic	2000	John Carney
72	Ruth Ann Minner (1935–2021)	January 3, 2001 – January 20, 2009 (2940 days; term-limited)	Democratic	2004	John Carney
73	Jack Markell (b. 1960)	January 20, 2009 – January 17, 2017 (2920 days; term-limited)	Democratic	2008	Matthew Denn (resigned January 6, 2015)
73	Jack Markell (b. 1960)	January 20, 2009 – January 17, 2017 (2920 days; term-limited)	Democratic	2012	Matthew Denn (resigned January 6, 2015)
73	Jack Markell (b. 1960)	January 20, 2009 – January 17, 2017 (2920 days; term-limited)	Democratic	2012	Vacant
74	John Carney (b. 1956)	January 17, 2017 – January 7, 2025 (2913 days; resigned) (Note: Carney resigned, having been elected mayor of Wilmington.)	Democratic	2016	Bethany Hall-Long
74	John Carney (b. 1956)	January 17, 2017 – January 7, 2025 (2913 days; resigned)	Democratic	2020	Bethany Hall-Long
75	Bethany Hall-Long (b. 1963)	January 7, 2025 – January 21, 2025 (15 days; retired)	Democratic	Succeeded from lieutenant governor	Vacant
76	Matt Meyer (b. 1971)	January 21, 2025 – Incumbent (Note: Meyer's term will expire on January 16, 2029.) (in office 671 days)	Democratic	2024	Kyle Evans Gay

== Timeline ==
Timeline of Delaware governors

== See also ==
- Gubernatorial lines of succession in the United States § Delaware
- Delaware gubernatorial elections
- Lieutenant Governor of Delaware
- List of colonial governors of Pennsylvania
- List of Delaware General Assembly sessions

== Sources ==
- "Former Delaware Governors". National Governors Association.
- "Delaware Constitution". State Democracy Research Initiative. University of Wisconsin Law School.
- Dubin, Michael J. (2003). United States Gubernatorial Elections, 1776–1860: The Official Results by State and County. McFarland. ISBN 0-7864-1439-1 – via Internet Archive.
- Dubin, Michael J. (2014). United States Gubernatorial Elections, 1861-1911: The Official Results by State and County. McFarland. ISBN 978-0-7864-4722-0 – via Google Books.
- Glashan, Roy R. (1979). American Governors and Gubernatorial Elections, 1775-1978. Meckler Books. ISBN 0-7201-1511-6 – via Internet Archive.
- Kallenbach, Joseph E.; Kallenbach, Jessamine S. (1977). American State Governors, 1776-1976. Oceana Publications. ISBN 978-0-379-00665-0 – via Internet Archive.
- Mullaney, Marie Marmo (1994). Biographical Directory of the Governors of the United States, 1988–1994. Greenwood Publishing Group. ISBN 0-313-28312-5 – via Internet Archive.
- Sobel, Robert; Raimo, John (1978). Biographical Directory of the Governors of the United States, 1789-1978. Vol. 1. Meckler Books. ISBN 0-930466-01-2 – via Internet Archive.
- Thorpe, Francis Newton, ed. (1909). The Federal and State Constitutions, Colonial Charters, and Other Organic Laws of the States, Territories, and Colonies Now or Heretofore Forming the United States of America. Vol. 1. United States Government Publishing Office – via Internet Archive.
- Biographical and Genealogical History of the State of Delaware. 1899 – via Google Books.
- Conrad, Henry Clay (1908). History of the State of Delaware, Volume 3 – via Internet Archive.
- Proceedings of the House of Assembly of the Delaware state, 1781-1792, and of the Constitutional Convention of 1792. 1988. ISBN 978-0-87413-309-7 – via Internet Archive.
- Governor's Register, State of Delaware. Vol. 1. Public Archives Commission of Delaware. 1926 – via Google Books.
