= 39th Delaware General Assembly =

American legislative session

←	38th	40th	→

Overview
- Legislative body: Delaware General Assembly
- Term: January 3, 1815 – January 2, 1816

The 39th Delaware General Assembly was a meeting of the legislative branch of the state government, consisting of the Delaware Senate and the Delaware House of Representatives. Elections were held the first Tuesday of October and terms began on the first Tuesday in January. It met in Dover, convening January 3, 1815, two weeks before the beginning of the second year of the administration of Governor Daniel Rodney.

The apportionment of seats was permanently assigned to three senators and seven representatives for each of the three counties. Population of the county did not effect the number of delegates. Both chambers had a Federalist majority.

== Leadership ==
=== Senate ===
- Jesse Green, Sussex County

=== House of Representatives ===
- Cornelius P. Comegys, Kent County

== Members ==
=== Senate ===
Senators were elected by the public for a three-year term, one third posted each year.

New Castle County

- Samuel H. Black
- Caesar A. Rodney
- Abraham Staats

Kent County

- George Cummins
- Henry Molleston
- James Morris

Sussex County

- Benjamin Burton
- Thomas Fisher
- Jesse Green

=== House of Representatives ===
Representatives were elected by the public for a one-year term.

New Castle County

- Jim Crow
- Victor du Pont
- Joseph England
- George R. Massey
- Alrichs Ryland
- John P. Sutton
- Nicholas G. Williamson

Kent County

- John Clarke
- Cornelius P. Comegys
- Jonathan Jenkins
- Isaac Lockwood
- John Mitchell
- John Pleasanton
- Spencer Williams

Sussex County

- Charles M. Cullen
- Robert Hill
- Charles Polk Jr.
- Thomas Townsend
- Nathan Vickers
- Ebe Walter
- Robert Wiltbank

== Places with more information ==
- Delaware Historical Society; website; 505 North Market Street, Wilmington, Delaware 19801; (302) 655-7161.
- University of Delaware; Library website; 181 South College Avenue, Newark, Delaware 19717; (302) 831-2965.
