= 36th Delaware General Assembly =

American legislative session

←	35th	37th	→

Overview
- Legislative body: Delaware General Assembly
- Term: January 7, 1812 – January 5, 1813

The 36th Delaware General Assembly was a meeting of the legislative branch of the state government, consisting of the Delaware Senate and the Delaware House of Representatives. Elections were held the first Tuesday of October and terms began on the first Tuesday in January. It met in Dover, convening January 7, 1812, two weeks before the beginning of the second year of the administration of Governor Joseph Haslet.

The apportionment of seats was permanently assigned to three senators and seven representatives for each of the three counties. Population of the county did not effect the number of delegates. Both chambers had a Federalist majority.

== Leadership ==
=== Senate ===
- James Sykes Jr., Kent County

=== House of Representatives ===
- Cornelius P. Comegys, Kent County

== Members ==
=== Senate ===
Senators were elected by the public for a three-year term, one third posted each year.

New Castle County

- Francis H. Haughey
- Andrew Reynolds
- John Way

Kent County

- Andrew Barratt
- George Cummins
- James Sykes Jr.

Sussex County

- Jesse Green
- Nathaniel Mitchell
- Samuel Paynter

=== House of Representatives ===
Representatives were elected by the public for a one-year term.

New Castle County

- Samuel H. Black
- George Clarke Jr.
- David Morrison
- Joseph Pierce
- George Read Jr.
- Abraham Staats
- Nicholas G. Williamson

Kent County

- John Clarke
- Cornelius P. Comegys
- William Denny
- James Finthswait
- John Marim
- Samuel White
- John Williams

Sussex County

- Joshua Burton
- Robert Hill
- Solomon Moore
- Caleb Rodney
- Nathan Vickers
- Ebe Walter
- William H. Wells

== Places with more information ==
- Delaware Historical Society; website; 505 North Market Street, Wilmington, Delaware 19801; (302) 655-7161.
- University of Delaware; Library website; 181 South College Avenue, Newark, Delaware 19717; (302) 831-2965.
