= Presley Spruance =

American politician (1785–1863)

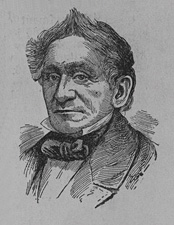

United States Senator from Delaware
- In office March 4, 1847 – March 3, 1853
- Preceded by: Thomas Clayton
- Succeeded by: John M. Clayton

Member of the Delaware Senate
- In office January 4, 1826 – January 3, 1832; January 4, 1835 – January 3, 1839; January 4, 1841 – January 3, 1845; January 4, 1847 – March 4, 1847

Member of the Delaware House of Representatives
- In office January 4, 1823 – January 3, 1824; January 4, 1839 – January 3, 1841

Personal details
- Born: September 11, 1785 Smyrna, Delaware
- Died: February 13, 1863 (aged 77) Smyrna, Delaware
- Party: Whig
- Occupation: Merchant

Presley Spruance (September 11, 1785 – February 13, 1863) was an American merchant and politician from Smyrna, in Kent County, Delaware. He was a member of the Federalist and later the Whig Party, who served in the Delaware General Assembly and as U.S. Senator from Delaware.

== Early life and family ==
Spruance was born in Kent County, Delaware.

== Professional and political career ==
He was engaged in manufacturing and mercantile pursuits in Smyrna, Delaware, where he was a member of the State House for the 1823 and 1839/40 sessions. In between these he was elected to the State Senate for the sessions from 1826 through 1831, again in 1835/36 and 1837/38, and returned for the 1841/42 and 1843/44 sessions and finally in 1847, several times serving as Speaker. He was elected as a Whig to the United States Senate and served one term from March 4, 1847, to March 3, 1853. Following his term he returned to his business pursuits.

== Death and legacy ==
Spruance died in Smyrna and is buried there in the Presbyterian Cemetery.

A house he built at Smyrna is a contributing property in the Smyrna Historic District.

== Almanac ==
Elections were held the first Tuesday of October. U.S. representatives were popularly elected March 4 for a two-year term. The General Assembly chose the U.S. senators, who also took office March 4, but for a six-year term.

Public offices
Office	Type	Location	Began office	Ended office	Notes
State Representative	Legislature	Dover	January 4, 1823	January 3, 1824	
State Senator	Legislature	Dover	January 4, 1826	January 3, 1829	Speaker
State Senator	Legislature	Dover	January 4, 1829	January 3, 1832	
State Senator	Legislature	Dover	January 4, 1835	January 3, 1839	Speaker
State Representative	Legislature	Dover	January 4, 1839	January 3, 1841	
State Senator	Legislature	Dover	January 4, 1841	January 3, 1845	Speaker
State Senator	Legislature	Dover	January 4, 1847	March 4, 1847	
U.S. Senator	Legislative	Washington	March 4, 1847	March 3, 1853	class 2

Delaware General Assembly service
Dates	Congress	Chamber	Majority	Governor	Committees	Class/District
1822	47th	State House	Republican	Joseph Haslet; Charles Thomas		Kent at-large
1825	50th	State Senate	Federalist	Samuel Paynter		Kent at-large
1826	51st	State Senate	Federalist	Charles Polk Jr.		Kent at-large
1827	52nd	State Senate	Federalist	Charles Polk Jr.	Speaker	Kent at-large
1828	53rd	State Senate	Federalist	Charles Polk Jr.		Kent at-large
1829	54th	State Senate	Whig	David Hazzard		Kent at-large
1830	55th	State Senate	Whig	David Hazzard		Kent at-large
1835/36	58th	State Senate	Whig	Caleb Bennett; Charles Polk Jr.		Kent at-large
1837/38	59th	State Senate	Whig	Cornelius Comegys	Speaker	Kent at-large
1839/40	60th	State House	Whig	Cornelius Comegys		Kent at-large
1841/42	61st	State Senate	Whig	William B. Cooper		Kent at-large
1843/44	62nd	State Senate	Whig	William B. Cooper	Speaker	Kent at-large
1847/48	64th	State Senate	Whig	William Tharp		Kent at-large

United States congressional service
Dates	Congress	Chamber	Majority	President	Committees	Class/District
1847–1849	30th	U.S. Senate	Democratic	James K. Polk		class 2
1849–1851	31st	U.S. Senate	Democratic	Zachary Taylor; Millard Fillmore		class 2
1851–1853	32nd	U.S. Senate	Democratic	Millard Fillmore		class 2

== Notes ==
U.S. Senate
Preceded by Thomas Clayton	U.S. senator from Delaware; 1847–1853	Succeeded by John M. Clayton
