= 37th Delaware General Assembly =

American legislative session

←	36th	38th	→

Overview
- Legislative body: Delaware General Assembly
- Term: January 5, 1813 – January 4, 1814

The 37th Delaware General Assembly was a meeting of the legislative branch of the state government, consisting of the Delaware Senate and the Delaware House of Representatives. Elections were held the first Tuesday of October and terms began on the first Tuesday in January. It met in Dover, convening January 5, 1813, two weeks before the beginning of the third year of the administration of Governor Joseph Haslet.

The apportionment of seats was permanently assigned to three senators and seven representatives for each of the three counties. Population of the county did not affect the number of delegates. Both chambers had a Federalist majority.

== Leadership ==
=== Senate ===
- Andrew Barratt, Kent County

=== House of Representatives ===
- Cornelius P. Comegys, Kent County

== Members ==
=== Senate ===
Senators were elected by the public for a three-year term, one third posted each year.

New Castle County

- Samuel H. Black
- Francis H. Haughey
- John Way

Kent County

- Andrew Barratt
- George Cummins
- James Morris

Sussex County

- Jesse Green
- Samuel Paynter
- William H. Wells

=== House of Representatives ===
Representatives were elected by the public for a one-year term.

New Castle County

- George Clarke Jr.
- John Harlan
- George R. Massey
- George Read Jr.
- Abraham Staats
- Peter Vandever
- Nicholas G. Williamson

Kent County

- Thomas Clayton
- Cornelius P. Comegys
- Luff Lewis
- Henry Molleston
- Jacob Stout
- Samuel White
- John Williams

Sussex County

- Joshua Burton
- Charles M. Cullen
- Robert Hill
- Solomon Moore
- Caleb Rodney
- Nathan Vickers
- Ebe Walter

== Places with more information ==
- Delaware Historical Society; website; 505 North Market Street, Wilmington, Delaware 19801; (302) 655-7161.
- University of Delaware; Library website; 181 South College Avenue, Newark, Delaware 19717; (302) 831-2965.
