= 38th Delaware General Assembly =

American legislative session

←	37th	39th	→

Overview
- Legislative body: Delaware General Assembly
- Term: January 4, 1814 – January 3, 1815

The 38th Delaware General Assembly was a meeting of the legislative branch of the state government, consisting of the Delaware Senate and the Delaware House of Representatives. Elections were held on the first Tuesday of October and terms began on the first Tuesday of January. It met in Dover, Delaware, convening on January 4, 1814, two weeks before the beginning of the first year of the administration of Governor Daniel Rodney.

The apportionment of seats was permanently assigned to three senators and seven representatives for each of the three counties. The population of the county did not affect the number of delegates. Both chambers had a Federalist majority.

== Leadership ==
=== Senate ===
- Andrew Barratt, Kent County

=== House of Representatives ===
- Cornelius P. Comegys, Kent County

== Members ==
=== Senate ===
Senators were elected by the public for a three-year term, one third posted each year.

New Castle County

- Samuel H. Black
- Abraham Staats
- John Way

Kent County

- Andrew Barratt
- George Cummins
- James Morris

Sussex County

- Benjamin Burton
- Thomas Fisher
- Jesse Green

=== House of Representatives ===
Representatives were elected by the public for a one-year term.

New Castle County

- Joseph England
- George R. Massey
- George Read Jr.
- Alichs Ryland
- John P. Sutton
- Peter Vandever
- Nicholas G. Williamson

Kent County

- John Clarke
- Thomas Clayton
- Cornelius P. Comegys
- Luff Lewis
- Henry Molleston
- Jacob Stout
- Spencer Williams

Sussex County

- Joshua Burton
- Charles M. Cullen
- Robert Hill
- Solomon Moore
- Charles Polk Jr.
- Nathan Vickers
- Ebe Walter

== Places with more information ==
- Delaware Historical Society; website; 505 North Market Street, Wilmington, Delaware 19801; (302) 655-7161.
- University of Delaware; Library website; 181 South College Avenue, Newark, Delaware 19717; (302) 831-2965.
