= Charles Wharton (American football) =

American football player (1868–1949)

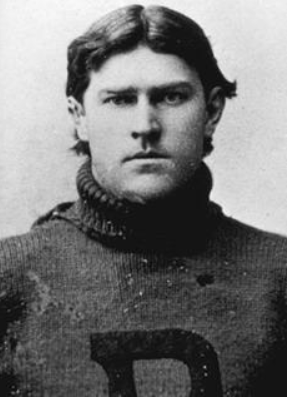

Penn Quakers
- Position: Guard

Personal information
- Born: November 14, 1871; Magnolia, Delaware, U.S.
- Died: November 14, 1949 (age 78); Dover, Delaware, U.S.

Career information
- College: Penn (1893–1896)

Awards and highlights
- 2× Consensus All-American (1895, 1896)
- College Football Hall of Fame (Class of 1963)

Charles M. "Buck" Wharton (November 14, 1871 – November 14, 1949) was an American football player, politician, and athletics administrator. He played college football as a guard for the Penn Quakers from 1893 to 1896, led the team to undefeated national championship seasons in 1894 and 1895, and was a three-time All-American. He later served in the Delaware Senate (1914–1918) and was the Democratic Party's candidate for Governor of Delaware in 1928. He was Penn's director of field athletics and assistant professor of physical education from 1919 to 1931 and head of the University of Delaware's physical education department from 1931 to 1937. He was posthumously inducted into the College Football Hall of Fame in 1963.

== Early years and education ==
Wharton was born in 1871 at Magnolia, Delaware, the son of William W. Wharton and Amanda M. Layton Wharton. He attended the public schools of Smyrna, Delaware, and Professor Roe's Academy. He then enrolled at the University of Pennsylvania where he received degrees from the dental school in 1896 and from the medical school in 1899.

== College football ==
While at Penn, Wharton played college football at the guard position for the Penn Quakers football teams from 1893 to 1896. During his time with the Quakers, they compiled a 34-game winning streak, including perfect seasons in 1894 (12–0) and 1895 (14–0) and back-to-back national championships. He was captain of the 1896 team that compiled a 14–1 record. Wharton received first-team All-America honors for three consecutive years, being recognized as an All-American in 1894 by Leslie's Weekly, in 1895 by Walter Camp and Caspar Whitney, and again in 1896 by Walter Camp.

In the College Football Hall of Fame biography of Wharton, he was called "a blocking dynamo, often taking out entire sides of an enemy line in the style of an axe-swinging Paul Bunyan."

== Later life ==
Wharton was active in politics, serving in the Delaware Senate from 1914 to 1918 and running unsuccessfully as the Democratic Party's candidate in the 1928 Delaware gubernatorial election. He also worked 12 years as Penn's director of field athletics and assistant professor of physical education. He resigned his position at Penn in 1931 when he was hired as the head of the University of Delaware's physical education department, a position he held for six years. In later years, Wharton served as the executive director of the Delaware Unemployment Compensation Commission.

Wharton died in 1949 at age 78 at his home in Dover, Delaware. In 1963, he was inducted into the College Football Hall of Fame. In 1978, he was inducted into the Delaware Sports Hall of Fame.

Party political offices
Preceded by Joseph Bancroft	Democratic nominee for Governor of Delaware; 1928	Succeeded by Landreth L. Layton
