= Caleb S. Layton =

American politician (1798–1882)

Caleb Sipple Layton
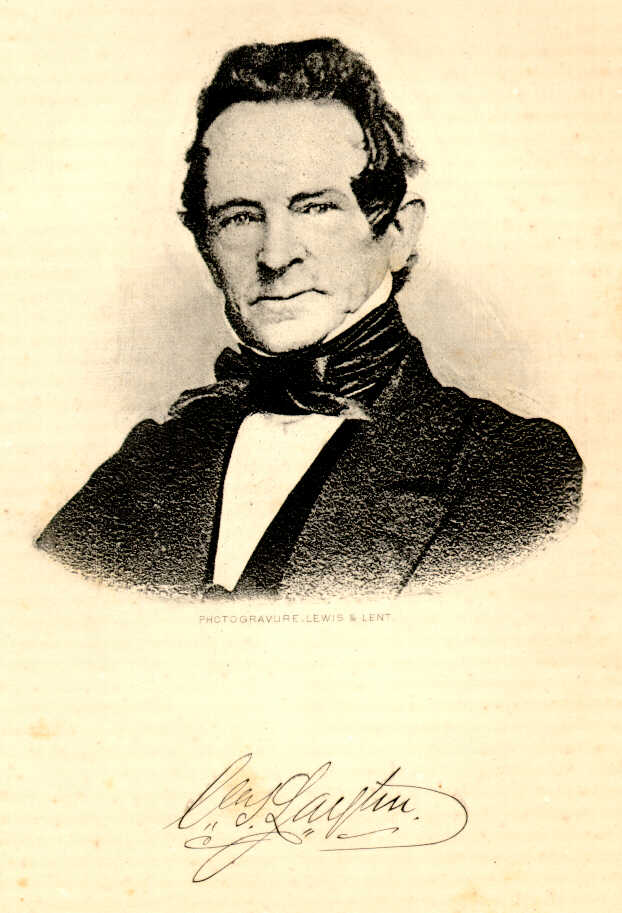
- Delaware Statesman

Delaware State Representative (1826–1830) Delaware State Senator (1830–1832) Secretary of State of Delaware (1833–1836) Associate Justice of the Delaware Superior Court (1836–1844)

Personal details
- Born: April 12, 1798 Sussex County, Delaware
- Died: October 3, 1882 (aged 84) Georgetown, Delaware
- Party: Federalist; Whig; Republican
- Spouse: Penelope Rodney

Hon. Caleb Sipple Layton (April 12, 1798 – October 3, 1882) was at various stages of his life a lawyer, member of the Delaware House of Representatives, a Delaware State Senator, Secretary of State of Delaware, and Associate Justice of the Delaware Superior Court. He was a resident of Sussex County, Delaware.

== Early life ==
Caleb S. Layton was born on the family homestead to Lowder Layton and Sarah, daughter of Caleb Sipple, of Kent County. He was the oldest of a family of six sons and three daughters. Soon after his birth the family moved to Milton, Delaware, where he was educated at local schools. He subsequently received more advanced instruction at the Philadelphia Grammar School. After completing his academic courses he returned to his native county and engaged in business with his father. On October 14, 1819, he married Penelope Rodney, daughter of Governor Caleb Rodney and Elizabeth West. The following year he was appointed Clerk of the Peace for Sussex County. He resigned this office in 1822, and entered upon the study of law with Thomas Cooper of Georgetown, one of the leading members of the Sussex bar. At the session of the State Legislature in 1824–25 he served as clerk of the Delaware Lower House, and was admitted to practice as an attorney-at-law in 1826. He died in Georgetown Delaware

== Career in law and politics ==
Layton soon established a wide reputation for himself as a wise counselor and a zealous and popular advocate before the jury. In 1826 he was elected a member of the Lower House of the State Legislature, and was re-elected for several successive terms. In 1830 he was elected a member of the Delaware Senate.

During the administration of Governor David Hazzard he served as Secretary of State of Delaware and was again appointed to the same office by Governor Charles Polk in 1836. While occupying this position he was appointed an Associate Justice of the Superior Court of Delaware, and occupied that place until July 1844, when, owing to the insufficiency of the fiscal returns from the office, he was compelled to resign. He returned to the practice of his profession in Georgetown and continued to be a respected leader of the Delaware bar.

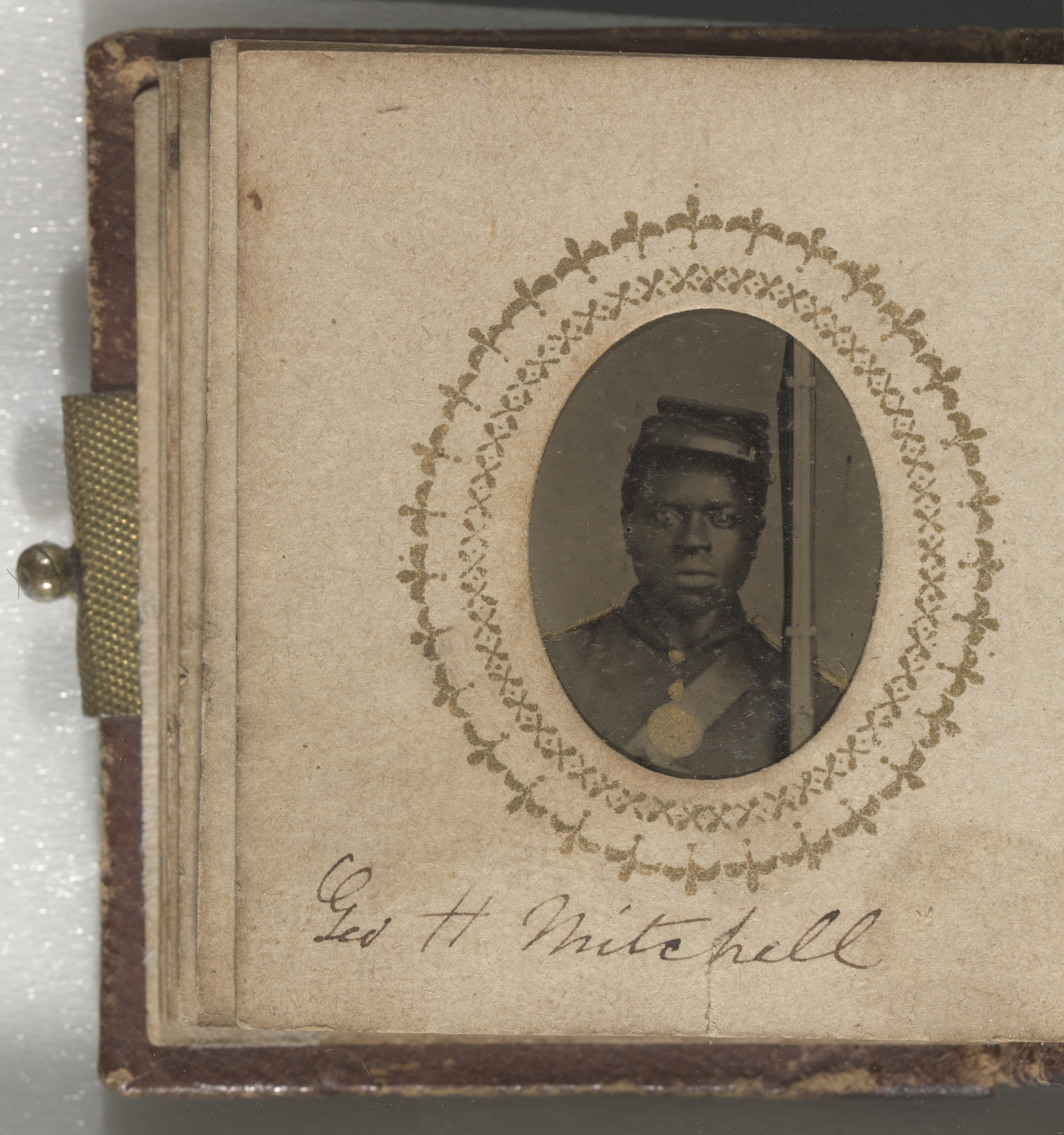
Image of George H. Mitchell, a former slave of Caleb S. Layton, in Union Army uniform

Aside from his professional prominence, Judge Layton exerted a wide influence in the domain of politics. He advocated the principles and sustained the purposes of the political organization to which he belonged. Originally he identified with the Federalist and Whig parties, and transitioned into the Republican Party as the American Civil War drew closer. He was noted by local historians to have been a forcible speaker, a close and accurate reasoner and a recognized leader in political life from 1825 until within a few years of his demise. He was the author of legislation that established the free school system in Delaware, and was opposed to slavery, and, as a member of the Legislature, was instrumental in presenting the first abolition bill in the State of Delaware. There is also a record of Layton assisting an unjustly enslaved woman named Ann Elliott have her freedom and that of her children recognized by the Delaware courts in 1849. Despite this, he himself owned slaves according to census records in 1840, 1850, and 1860. In 1864 during the American Civil War, Layton enlisted his slave George H. Mitchell into the Union's 25th United States Colored Infantry Regiment. Layton received a $300 bounty while Mitchell was granted his freedom at the end of the war.

== Family life ==
Layton was a member of the Episcopal Church.

His father died on June 26, 1849. Judge Layton's first wife died in July 1855. They had nine children, as follows:

- Joseph R. Layton (b. 1820) - graduated from University of Pennsylvania Medical School in 1946 and served as a Union Navy surgeon during the American Civil War
- William L. Layton – died young
- Samuel H. Layton (1824–1892) – lived in Frankford, Delaware, and was later the father of Caleb R. Layton
- Caleb R. Layton (– rose to Colonel in the army of the United States and later died August 20, 1887
- Sarah E. Layton – died young
- Hester A. – died young
- Daniel J. Layton – a prominent citizen and resident of Georgetown
- Penelope McKim – wife of Rev. John Linn McKim
- Lavinia J. Plummer – married Rev. George F. Plummer.

For his second wife Judge Layton married Anna M., daughter of Dr. William Morris, of Dover, Delaware. She died in the fall of 1886.
