= 1786 Delaware gubernatorial election =

- October 27, 1786
Nominee	Thomas Collins
Party	Nonpartisan
Governor before election
Nicholas Van Dyke
Nonpartisan
Elected Governor
Thomas Collins
Nonpartisan

The 1786 Delaware gubernatorial election was held on October 27, 1786. The judge of the Delaware Court of Common Pleas Thomas Collins was elected president of Delaware for a term of three years.

The conservative Political faction in Delaware politics had regained the ascendancy following their defeat in the last election, and in 1786 took control of the Delaware House of Assembly. Collins, a militia officer and respected landowner from Kent County, Delaware, was considered broadly acceptable to all factions.

The election was conducted by the Delaware General Assembly. Collins was elected unanimously on the first ballot. The number of votes cast was not recorded.

== General election ==
1786 Delaware gubernatorial election
Candidate	First ballot	
Candidate	Count	Percent
Nicholas Van Dyke	**	100.00
Total	**	100.00

== Bibliography ==
- Delaware (1887). Minutes of the Council of the Delaware State, from 1776 to 1792. Wilmington: Historical Society of Delaware.
- Munroe, John A. (1954). Federalist Delaware, 1775–1815. New Brunswick: Rutgers University Press.
