= Governor Polk =

Governor Polk may refer to:

- Charles Polk Jr. (1788–1857), 27th and 30th Governor of Delaware
- James K. Polk (1795–1849), 9th Governor of Tennessee
- Trusten Polk (1811–1876), 12th Governor of Missouri
