= 1836 Delaware gubernatorial election =

- November 8, 1836
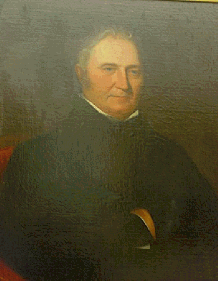
Nominee	Cornelius P. Comegys	Nehemiah Clark
Party	Whig	Democratic
Popular vote	4,693	4,276
Percentage	52.32%	47.68%
- Comegys: 50–60% Clark: 50–60%
Governor before election
Charles Polk Jr.
Whig
Elected Governor
Cornelius Comegys
Whig

The 1836 Delaware gubernatorial election was held on November 8, 1836. Democratic Governor Caleb P. Bennett, elected in 1832 and died in office on May 9, 1836, and was succeeded by State Senate Speaker (and former Governor) Charles Polk Jr., a Whig. Former State House Speaker and State Treasurer Cornelius P. Comegys ran as the Whig nominee to succeed Polk and faced Democratic nominee Nehemiah Clark in the general election. Continuing the streak of closely fought elections, Comegys narrowly defeated Clark, winning 52% of the vote to Clark's 48%.

== General election ==
=== Results ===
1836 Delaware gubernatorial election
Party	Candidate	Votes	%	±%
Whig	Cornelius Comegys	4,693	52.32%	—
Democratic	Nehemiah Clark	4,276	47.68%	−2.65%
Majority		417	4.65%	+4.01%
Turnout		8,969	100.00%	
Whig hold				

== Bibliography ==
- Gubernatorial Elections, 1787-1997. Washington, D.C.: Congressional Quarterly Inc. 1998. ISBN 1-56802-396-0.
- Glashan, Roy R. (1979). American Governors and Gubernatorial Elections, 1775-1978. Meckler Books. ISBN 0-930466-17-9.
- Dubin, Michael J. (2003). United States Gubernatorial Elections, 1776-1860: The Official Results by State and County. Jefferson, North Carolina: McFarland. ISBN 978-0-7864-1439-0.
