= 40th Delaware General Assembly =

American legislative session

←	39th	41st	→

Overview
- Legislative body: Delaware General Assembly
- Term: January 2, 1816 – January 7, 1817

The 40th Delaware General Assembly was a meeting of the legislative branch of the state government, consisting of the Delaware Senate and the Delaware House of Representatives. Elections were held the first Tuesday of October and terms began on the first Tuesday in January. It met in Dover, convening January 2, 1816, two weeks before the beginning of the third year of the administration of Governor Daniel Rodney.

The apportionment of seats was permanently assigned to three senators and seven representatives for each of the three counties. Population of the county did not effect the number of delegates. Both chambers had a Federalist majority.

== Leadership ==
=== Senate ===
- Jesse Green, Sussex County

=== House of Representatives ===
- Nathan Vickers, Sussex County

== Members ==
=== Senate ===
Senators were elected by the public for a three-year term, one third posted each year.

New Castle County

- Caesar Augustus Rodney
- Abraham Staats
- Nicholas Van Dyke Jr.

Kent County

- George Cummins
- Henry Molleston
- Jacob Stout

Sussex County

- Benjamin Burton
- Jesse Green
- Caleb Rodney

=== Delaware House of Representative ===
Representatives were elected by the public for a one-year term.

New Castle County

- Samuel H. Black
- John T. Cochran
- John Crow
- Victor du Pont
- Andrew Reynolds
- John P. Sutton
- Nicholas G. Williamson

Kent County

- John Clarke
  - James Battell
- Cornelius P. Comegys
- John Cummins
- John Mitchell
- Henry M. Ridgely
- Joseph G. Rowland
- Spencer Williams

Sussex County

- Isaiah Burton
- John Carlisle
- William B. Cooper
- Charles M. Cullen
- Robert Hill
  - Louder Layton
- Nathan Vickers
- Ebe Walter

== Places with more information ==
- Delaware Historical Society; website; 505 North Market Street, Wilmington, Delaware 19801; (302) 655–7161.
- University of Delaware; Library website; 181 South College Avenue, Newark, Delaware 19717; (302) 831–2965.
