= Governor Bennett =

Governor Bennett may refer to:

- Benjamin Bennett (governor) (16??–17??), Governor of Bermuda
- Caleb P. Bennett (1758–1836), 29th Governor of Delaware
- John O. Bennett (born 1948), Acting Governor of New Jersey, 2002
- Richard Bennett (governor) (1609–1675), Governor of the Colony of Virginia from 1652 to 1655
- Robert Frederick Bennett (1927–2000), 39th Governor of Kansas
- Thomas Bennett Jr. (1781–1865), 48th Governor of South Carolina
- Thomas W. Bennett (Idaho politician) (1831–1893), 5th Governor of Idaho Territory
