= 1789 Delaware gubernatorial election =

- May 30, 1789
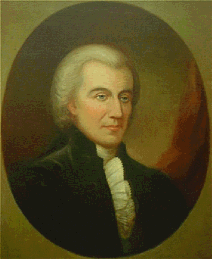
Nominee	Joshua Clayton
Party	Nonpartisan
President before election
Jehu Davis (acting)
Nonpartisan
Elected President
Joshua Clayton
Nonpartisan

The 1789 Delaware gubernatorial election was held on May 30, 1789. The former member of the Delaware House of Assembly Joshua Clayton was elected president of Delaware for a term of three years.

The previous president Thomas Collins died in office on March 29, 1789. The speaker of the House of Assembly Jehu Davis acted as president pending the election of Collins's successor.

The election was conducted by the Delaware General Assembly. Clayton was elected on the first ballot. The number of votes cast was not recorded.

== General election ==
1789 Delaware gubernatorial election
Candidate	First ballot	
Candidate	Count	Percent
Joshua Clayton	**	**
Total	**	100.00

== Bibliography ==
- Delaware (1887). Minutes of the Council of the Delaware State, from 1776 to 1792. Wilmington: Historical Society of Delaware.
- Raimo, John W. (1980). Biographical Directory of American Colonial and Revolutionary Governors, 1607–1789. Westport, CT: Meckler Books.
- Sobel, Robert; Raimo, John (1978). Biographical Directory of the Governors of the United States 1789–1978. Vol. 4. Westport, CT: Meckler Books.
