= Smyrna Historic District =

Historic district in Delaware, US

- U.S. National Register of Historic Places
- U.S. Historic district
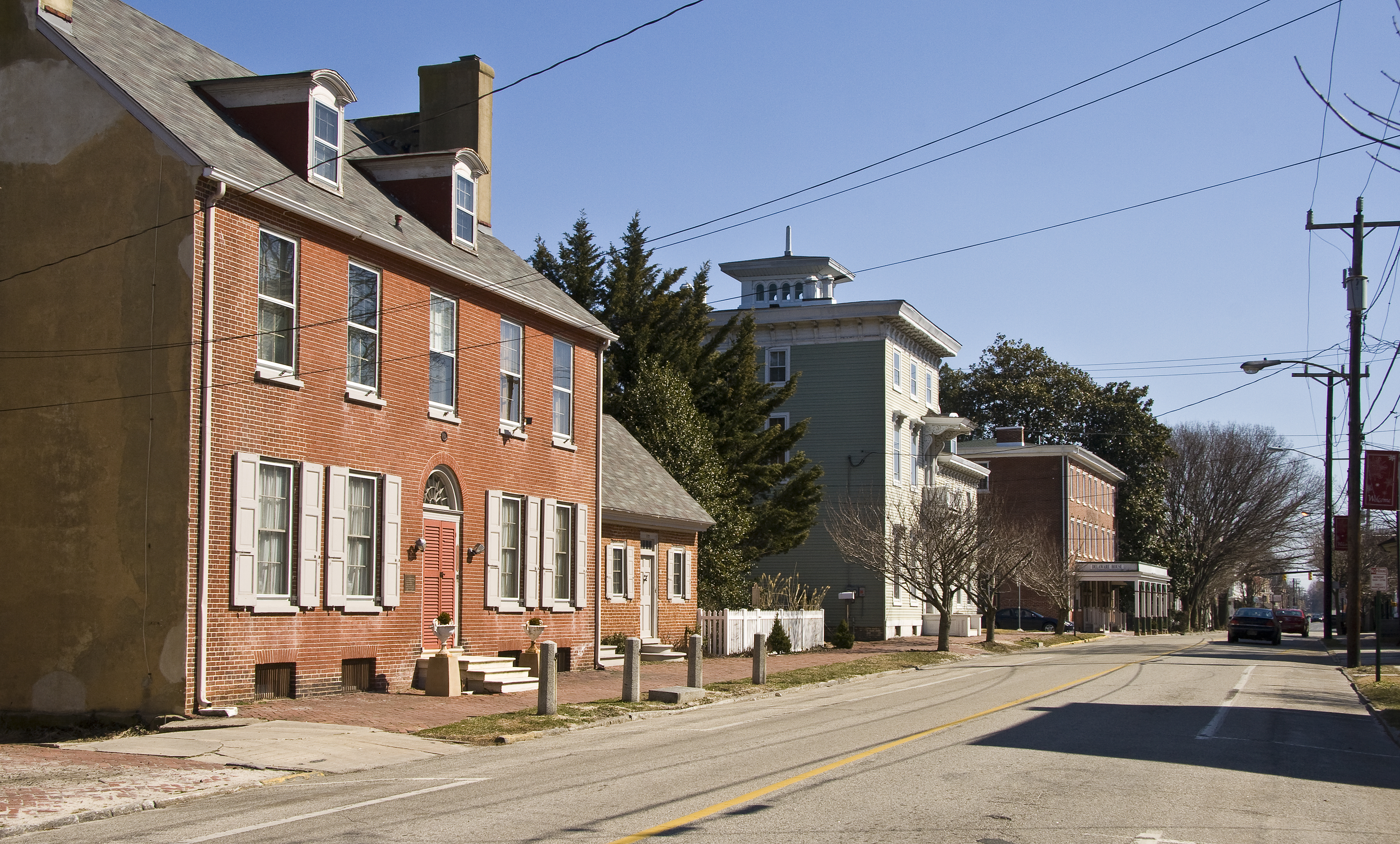
- Smyrna Historic District, March 2010

- Location within Delaware Location within the United States
- Location: DE 6 and U.S. 13, Smyrna, Delaware
- Coordinates: 39°17′59″N 75°36′24″W
- Area: 132 acres (53 ha)
- Built: 1770
- Architectural style: Greek Revival, Italianate, Federal
- MPS: African--American Resources in Delaware MPS (AD)
- NRHP reference No.: 80000930
- Added to NRHP: May 23, 1980

Smyrna Historic District is a national historic district located at Smyrna, Kent County, Delaware. It encompasses 850 contributing buildings in the town of Smyrna. It includes the majority of residential, commercial, public and ecclesiastical buildings that pre-date 1920, the bulk of which were constructed in the mid-to-late 19th century. Notable buildings include the Cummins-Stockly House, Irishtown Tavern, Spruance House, John Cummins Mansion, A. G. Cummins, Sr. House, Governor William Temple Mansion, Daniel Cummins' Tavern and House, "Greybox," Delaware House, Jones' Drug Store, Smyrna/Clayton Masonic Building, the Peterson Building, Tilghman Building (c. 1840), Abraham Pierce Store (c. 1810), the "Colonial Hotel," Bethel African Methodist Episcopal Church, Citizen's Hose Company No. 1, Benjamin Benson House (1834), Asbury Methodist Church (1845, 1872), Ebenezer Cloak Mansion, and Mt. Olive Holiness Pentecostal (1876).

It was listed on the National Register of Historic Places in 1980.
