= 1783 Delaware gubernatorial election =

- February 1, 1783
Nominee	Nicholas Van Dyke
Party	Nonpartisan
1st ballot	18
President before election
John Cook (acting)
Nonpartisan
Elected President
Nicholas Van Dyke
Nonpartisan

The 1783 Delaware gubernatorial election was held on February 1, 1783. The former delegate to the Congress of the Confederation from Delaware Nicholas Van Dyke was elected president of Delaware for a term of three years.

The previous president John Dickinson resigned on November 4, 1782, following his election as president of Pennsylvania. The president of the Council John Cook acted as president pending the election of Dickinson's successor.

Delaware politics during the 1780s witnessed the rise of conservative and radical Political factions, with Dickinson's 1781 election reflecting the early-decade conservative ascendancy. Dickinson's resignation represented a victory for the radicals, who led the public backlash against nonresident officeholding. Following Dickinson's ouster, conservative leaders were thought to favor the former president John McKinly or the chief justice of the Delaware Supreme Court William Killen to succeed Cook, but radical opposition in the legislature defeated their candidacies. Van Dyke's election was interpreted as a rebuke of Pennsylvanian influence over the state government.

The election was conducted by the Delaware General Assembly. Van Dyke was elected with a majority on the first ballot.

== General election ==
1783 Delaware gubernatorial election
Candidate	First ballot	
Candidate	Count	Percent
Nicholas Van Dyke	18	60.00
Others	12	40.00
Total	30	100.00

== Bibliography ==
- Delaware (1887). Minutes of the Council of the Delaware State, from 1776 to 1792. Wilmington: Historical Society of Delaware.
- Kallenbach, Joseph E.; Kallenbach, Jessamine S. (1977). American State Governors, 1776–1976. Vol. 1. Dobbs Ferry, NY: Oceana Publications.
- Munroe, John A. (1954). Federalist Delaware, 1775–1815. New Brunswick: Rutgers University Press.
