= 1826 Delaware gubernatorial election =

- October 3, 1826
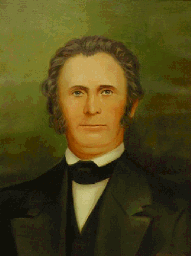

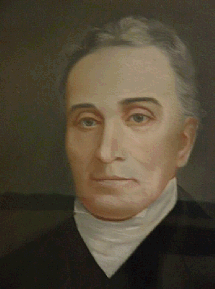
Nominee	Charles Polk Jr.	David Hazzard
Party	Federalist	Democratic-Republican
Popular vote	4,333	4,238
Percentage	50.55%	49.45%
- Polk: 60–70% Hazzard: 50–60% 60–70%
Governor before election
Samuel Paynter
Federalist
Elected Governor
Charles Polk Jr.
Federalist

The 1826 Delaware gubernatorial election was held on October 3, 1826. Incumbent Federalist Governor Samuel Paynter was barred from seeking re-election to a second consecutive term. State Senator Charles Polk Jr. ran as the Federalist nominee to succeed Paynter, while 1823 Democratic-Republican nominee David Hazzard once again ran as his party's nominee. Polk defeated Hazzard by a narrow margin, barely holding onto the governorship for the Federalists.

== General election ==
=== Results ===
1826 Delaware gubernatorial election
Party	Candidate	Votes	%	±%
Federalist	Charles Polk Jr.	4,333	50.55%	−1.21%
Democratic-Republican	David Hazzard	4,238	49.45%	+1.21%
Majority		95	1.11%	−2.43%
Turnout		8,571	100.00%	
Federalist hold				

== Bibliography ==
- Gubernatorial Elections, 1787-1997. Washington, D.C.: Congressional Quarterly Inc. 1998. ISBN 1-56802-396-0.
- Glashan, Roy R. (1979). American Governors and Gubernatorial Elections, 1775-1978. Meckler Books. ISBN 0-930466-17-9.
- Dubin, Michael J. (2003). United States Gubernatorial Elections, 1776-1860: The Official Results by State and County. Jefferson, North Carolina: McFarland. ISBN 978-0-7864-1439-0.
