= Comegys House =

- Interactive map of the Comegys House area
- Alternative names: B. B. Comegys Estate

General information
- Type: Mansion
- Architectural style: Italianate
- Location: 4203–4205 Walnut Street, Philadelphia, Pennsylvania, United States
- Coordinates: 39.954980°N 75.206930°W
- Completed: 1860s
- Demolished: After 1965
- Client: B. B. Comegys

The Comegys House, also known as the B. B. Comegys Estate, was a mansion, built in the 1860s, in the West Philadelphia neighborhood of Philadelphia. As the property of educator B. B. Comegys and his descendants, the property was demolished sometime after 1965.

== History ==
The mansion was designed in the Italianate style in the 1860s. It was built for B. B. Comegys, the son of Cornelius P. Comegys, who worked as a merchant and banker. The building's edifice bordered the Allison Mansion, which now serves as the main building for Walnut Hill College.

After B. B. Comegys' death in 1900, the mansion stayed within the Comegys family, up until its sale to developers in 1959.

By 1959, Comegys' library volumes inside the property were removed and donated to the National Museum of History and Technology (now the National Museum of American History) of the Smithsonian Institution. The volumes were later featured in an exhibit on "Everyday Life in the American Past" in 1966.

In 1965, the mansion was listed to the Philadelphia Register of Historic Places.
