= 1778 Delaware gubernatorial election =

- March 31, 1778
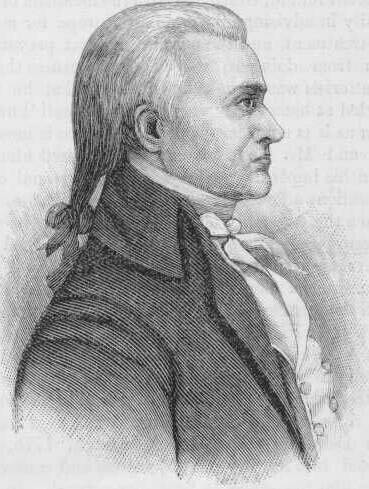
Nominee	Caesar Rodney
Party	Nonpartisan
1st ballot	20
President before election
George Read (acting)
Nonpartisan
Elected President
Caesar Rodney
Nonpartisan

The 1778 Delaware gubernatorial election was held on March 31, 1778. The delegate to the Continental Congress from Delaware Caesar Rodney was elected president of Delaware for a term of three years.

The previous president John McKinly was captured by the British Army in September 1777, less than a year into his three-year term. In succession, the speaker of the Assembly Thomas McKean and the president of the Council George Read acted as president pending the election of McKinly's successor.

The election was conducted by the Delaware General Assembly. Rodney was elected with a majority on the first ballot.

== General election ==
1778 Delaware gubernatorial election
Candidate	First ballot	
Candidate	Count	Percent
Caesar Rodney	20	83.33
Others	4	16.67
Total	24	100.00

== Bibliography ==
- Delaware (1887). Minutes of the Council of the Delaware State, from 1776 to 1792. Wilmington: Historical Society of Delaware.
- Kallenbach, Joseph E.; Kallenbach, Jessamine S. (1977). American State Governors, 1776–1976. Vol. 1. Dobbs Ferry, NY: Oceana Publications.
- Munroe, John A. (1954). Federalist Delaware, 1775–1815. New Brunswick: Rutgers University Press.
