= Charles C. Stockley =

American politician (1819–1901)

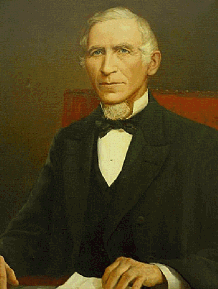

45th Governor of Delaware
- In office January 16, 1883 – January 18, 1887
- Preceded by: John W. Hall
- Succeeded by: Benjamin T. Biggs

Member of the Delaware Senate
- In office January 6, 1873 – January 6, 1877

Personal details
- Born: November 6, 1819 Georgetown, Delaware, U.S.
- Died: April 20, 1901 (aged 81) Georgetown, Delaware, U.S.
- Party: Democratic
- Spouse: Ellen Anderson

Charles Clark Stockley (November 6, 1819 – April 20, 1901) was an American politician from Georgetown in Sussex County, Delaware. He was a member of the Democratic Party, who served in the Delaware General Assembly and as Governor of Delaware.

== Early life and family ==
Stockley was born near Georgetown, Delaware, son of Jehu and Hannah Rodney Kollock Stockley. Returning from school in Philadelphia in 1839, he taught school for seven years and then opened a general store in Millsboro, Delaware. His primary occupation was farming the extensive real estate he owned. Eventually he became one of the major peach growers in eastern Sussex County. Stockley married Ellen Anderson in 1859, and they had one child, Hannah. They lived on Cedar Lane (State Rd 318) southeast of Georgetown, near the present-day airport, and were members of St. Paul's Episcopal Church.

== Professional and political career ==
Stockley served as Sussex County Treasurer before becoming Sussex County Sheriff in 1856. He was elected to the state senate in 1873, where he served until 1876 sessions. During the latter session, he held the position of Speaker.

He returned home and served as president of the Breakwater and Frankford Railroad, director of the Junction and Breakwater Railroad and as president of the Farmer's Bank of Georgetown, Delaware.

Nearly eight years later the Democrats recruited him as their candidate for governor. He campaigned against tariffs, in favor of expanding the state legislature and for educating the black children in the state, but in separate schools. After defeating Albert Curry of Greenwood, the Republican candidate, he served as governor from January 16, 1883 until January 18, 1887.

The majority Democratic Party still described itself as, “the White Man's Party”, and still promoted thinking that could criticize African American voting rights, as an “insane policy of investing an ignorant and inferior race with the sacred rights of the ballot.” Nevertheless, now twenty years after the Civil War, the first stirrings of tolerance were heard. Stockley, on his retirement, noted that “Our colored citizens are improving their advantages by laudable efforts to acquire homes for themselves and education for their children. The prejudice against their enfranchisement is fast disappearing, and I trust will soon pass away forever."

== Death and legacy ==
Stockley died at his home and is buried in the St. Paul's Episcopal Churchyard at Georgetown.

The Stockely Center, a facility of the Delaware Department of Health and Social Services, is named in his honor because of his early advocacy of services for the "feebly-minded."

Delaware General Assembly (sessions while Governor)
Year	Assembly	Senate Majority	Speaker	House Majority	Speaker
1883–1884	82nd	Democratic	Samuel B. Cooper	Democratic	George H. Bates
1885–1886	83rd	Democratic	Alexander B. Cooper	Democratic	William A. Comegys

== Almanac ==
Elections are held the first Tuesday after November 1. Members of the Delaware General Assembly took office the first Tuesday of January. State senators have a four-year term. The governor takes office the third Tuesday of January and has a four-year term.

Public Offices
Office	Type	Location	Began office	Ended office	notes
State Senator	Legislature	Dover	January 6, 1873	January 6, 1877	Speaker
Governor	Executive	Dover	January 16, 1883	January 18, 1887	

Delaware General Assembly service
Dates	Assembly	Chamber	Majority	Governor	Committees	District
1873–1874	77th	State Senator	Democratic	James Ponder		Sussex at-large
1875–1876	78th	State Senator	Democratic	John P. Cochran	Speaker	Sussex at-large

Election results
Year	Office	Subject	Party	Votes	%	Opponent	Party	Votes	%
1882	Governor	Charles C. Stockley	Democratic	16,558	53%	Albert Curry	Republican	14,620	47%

== Images ==
- Hall of Governors Portrait Gallery Portrait courtesy of Historical and Cultural Affairs, Dover.

== Places with more information ==
- Delaware Historical Society; website; 505 North Market Street, Wilmington, Delaware 19801; (302) 655–7161
- University of Delaware; Library website; 181 South College Avenue, Newark, Delaware 19717; (302) 831–2965

Party political offices
Preceded by John W. Hall	Democratic nominee for Governor of Delaware; 1882	Succeeded by Benjamin T. Biggs
Political offices
Preceded by John W. Hall	Governor of Delaware; 1883–1887	Succeeded by Benjamin T. Biggs
