= 1829 Delaware gubernatorial election =

- October 6, 1829
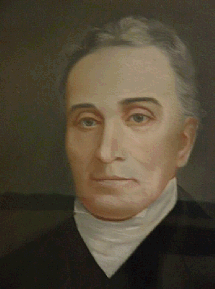
Nominee	David Hazzard	Allan Thompson
Party	National Republican	Jacksonian
Popular vote	4,215	4,046
Percentage	51.02%	48.98%
- Hazzard: 60–70% Thompson: 50–60%
Governor before election
Charles Polk Jr.
Federalist
Elected Governor
David Hazzard
National Republican

The 1829 Delaware gubernatorial election was held on October 6, 1829. Incumbent Federalist Governor Charles Polk Jr. was barred from seeking re-election to a second consecutive term. David Hazzard, the two-time Democratic-Republican nominee for Governor, ran as the National Republican, or Anti-Jacksonian, candidate as the First Party System crumbled and new political parties were formed. He was opposed by Allan Thompson, the Jacksonian candidate. Hazzard ended up winning the governorship on his third try, narrowly beating out Thompson.

== General election ==
=== Results ===
1829 Delaware gubernatorial election
Party	Candidate	Votes	%	±%
National Republican	David Hazzard	4,215	51.02%	—
Jacksonian	Allan Thompson	4,046	48.98%	—
Majority		169	2.05%	+0.94%
Turnout		8,261	100.00%	
National Republican gain from Federalist				

== Bibliography ==
- Gubernatorial Elections, 1787-1997. Washington, D.C.: Congressional Quarterly Inc. 1998. ISBN 1-56802-396-0.
- Glashan, Roy R. (1979). American Governors and Gubernatorial Elections, 1775-1978. Meckler Books. ISBN 0-930466-17-9.
- Dubin, Michael J. (2003). United States Gubernatorial Elections, 1776-1860: The Official Results by State and County. Jefferson, North Carolina: McFarland. ISBN 978-0-7864-1439-0.
