= 1882 Delaware gubernatorial election =

- November 7, 1882
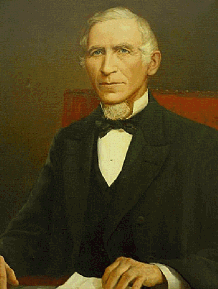

Nominee	Charles C. Stockley	Albert Curry
Party	Democratic	Republican
Popular vote	16,558	14,620
Percentage	53.04%	46.83%
- County results Stockley: 50–60%
Governor before election
John W. Hall
Democratic
Elected Governor
Charles C. Stockley
Democratic

The 1882 Delaware gubernatorial election was held on November 7, 1882. Incumbent Democratic Governor John W. Hall was unable to seek re-election. Former State Senator Charles C. Stockley ran as the Democratic nominee to succeed Hall and faced Republican nominee Albert Curry. The Republican Party campaigned on organizing a new constitutional convention and launched a vigorous statewide effort. However, Stockley defeated Curry by a decisive margin and a unanimously Democratic state legislature was elected alongside him, securing the Party's dominance in the state for another four years.

== General election ==
=== Results ===
1882 Delaware gubernatorial election
Party	Candidate	Votes	%	±%
Democratic	Charles C. Stockley	16,558	53.04%	−25.56%
Republican	Albert Curry	14,620	46.83%	—
Write-ins		42	0.13%	—
Majority		1,938	6.21%	−51.62%
Turnout		31,220	100.00%	
Democratic hold				

== Bibliography ==
- Gubernatorial Elections, 1787-1997. Washington, D.C.: Congressional Quarterly Inc. 1998. ISBN 1-56802-396-0.
- Glashan, Roy R. (1979). American Governors and Gubernatorial Elections, 1775-1978. Meckler Books. ISBN 0-930466-17-9.
- Dubin, Michael J. (2003). United States Gubernatorial Elections, 1776-1860: The Official Results by State and County. Jefferson, North Carolina: McFarland. ISBN 978-0-7864-1439-0.
- Delaware Senate Journal, 79th General Assembly, 1st Reg. Sess. (1883).
