= 1781 Delaware gubernatorial election =

- November 6, 1781
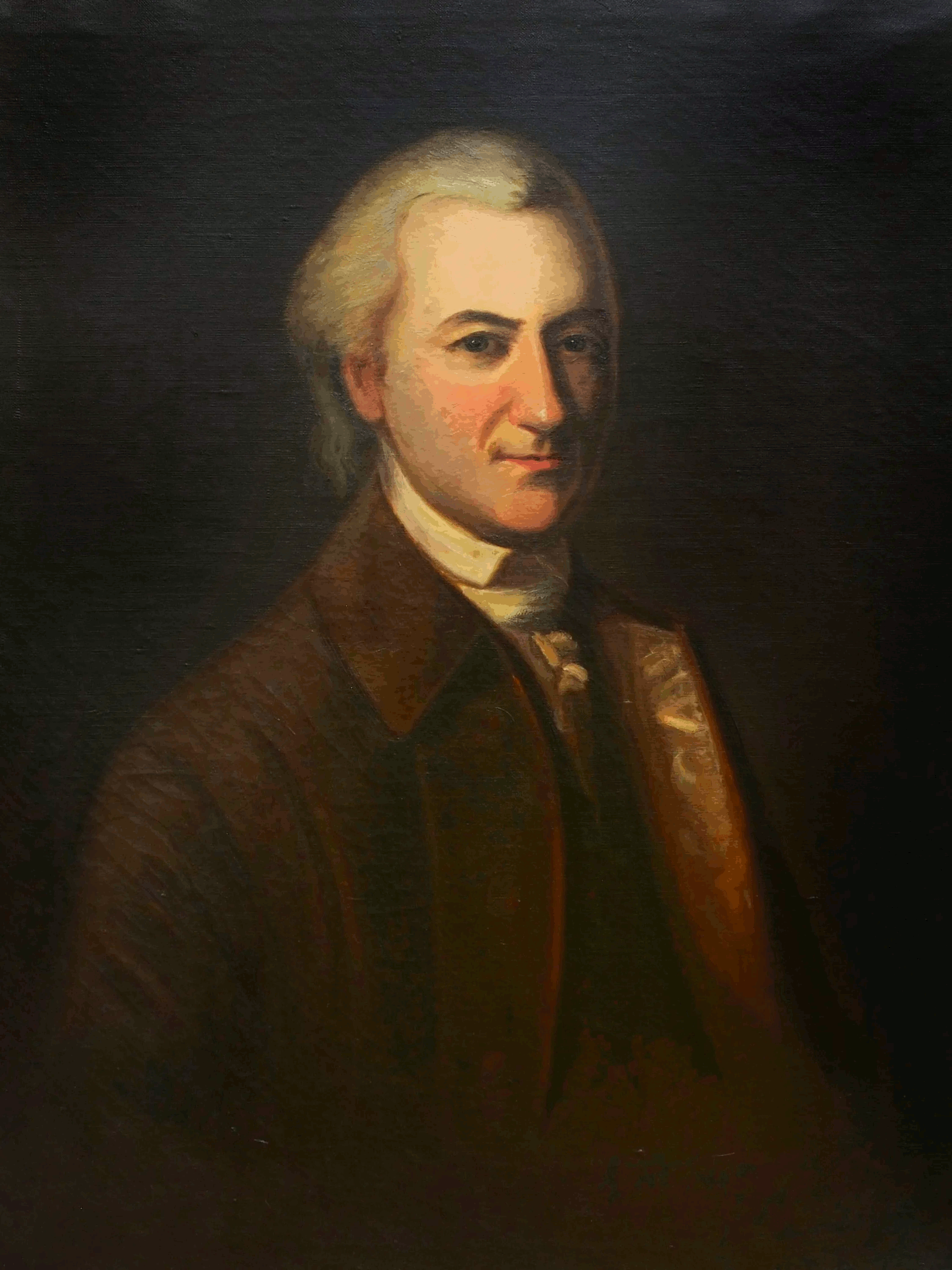
Nominee	John Dickinson
Party	Nonpartisan
1st ballot	25
President before election
Caesar Rodney
Nonpartisan
Elected President
John Dickinson
Nonpartisan

The 1781 Delaware gubernatorial election was held on November 6, 1781. The councilor from Kent County John Dickinson was elected president of Delaware for a term of three-years.

Delaware politics during the 1780s witnessed the rise of conservative and radical Political factions, with the radical leaders predominating during the American War of Independence. The withdraw of British Army forces from Philadelphia in 1779 preceded the rise of the conservative faction, with which Dickinson, formerly an opponent of American independence, was associated. Dickinson's election to succeed the radical outgoing president Caesar Rodney represented the ascendency of a nationalist group of Founding Fathers who favored a more powerful central government for the United States.

The election was conducted by the Delaware General Assembly. Dickinson was elected with a majority on the first ballot.

== General election ==
1781 Delaware gubernatorial election
Candidate	First ballot	
Candidate	Count	Percent
John Dickinson	25	96.15
Others	1	3.85
Total	26	100.00

== Bibliography ==
- Delaware (1887). Minutes of the Council of the Delaware State, from 1776 to 1792. Wilmington: Historical Society of Delaware.
- Munroe, John A. (1954). Federalist Delaware, 1775–1815. New Brunswick: Rutgers University Press.
