= 1878 Delaware gubernatorial election =

- November 5, 1878
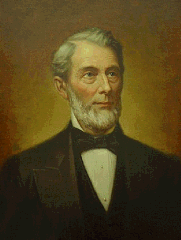

Nominee	John W. Hall	Kensey Johns Stewart
Party	Democratic	Greenback
Popular vote	10,730	2,835
Percentage	79.10%	20.90%
- County results Hall: 60–70% 80–90% 90–100%
Governor before election
John P. Cochran
Democratic
Elected Governor
John W. Hall
Democratic

The 1878 Delaware gubernatorial election was held on November 5, 1878. Incumbent Democratic Governor John P. Cochran was unable to seek re-election. Former State Senator John W. Hall ran as the Democratic nominee to succeed Cochran. The Republican Party, chastened by its long string of defeats, failed to run a statewide candidate. Instead, the Greenback Party stepped in, and Kensey Johns Stewart ran as the Greenback nominee. The absence of the Republican Party on the ballot caused turnout to crash, and Hall defeated Stewart by the largest margin in state history.

== General election ==
=== Results ===
1878 Delaware gubernatorial election
Party	Candidate	Votes	%	±%
Democratic	John W. Hall	10,730	78.60%	+26.01%
Greenback	Kensey Johns Stewart	2,835	20.77%	—
Independent	Christian Febiger	30	0.22%	—
Write-ins		57	0.42%	—
Majority		7,895	57.83%	+52.65%
Turnout		13,652	100.00%	
Democratic hold				

== Bibliography ==
- Gubernatorial Elections, 1787-1997. Washington, D.C.: Congressional Quarterly Inc. 1998. ISBN 1-56802-396-0.
- Glashan, Roy R. (1979). American Governors and Gubernatorial Elections, 1775-1978. Meckler Books. ISBN 0-930466-17-9.
- Dubin, Michael J. (2003). United States Gubernatorial Elections, 1776-1860: The Official Results by State and County. Jefferson, North Carolina: McFarland. ISBN 978-0-7864-1439-0.
- Delaware Senate Journal, 77th General Assembly, 1st Reg. Sess. (1879).
