= 1832 Delaware gubernatorial election =

- November 6, 1832
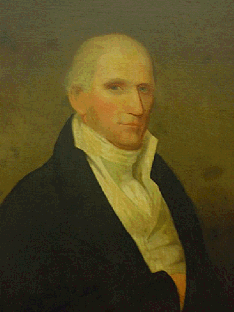

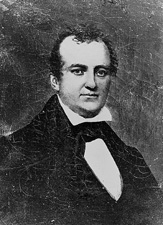
Nominee	Caleb P. Bennett	Arnold Naudain
Party	Democratic	National Republican
Popular vote	4,220	4,166
Percentage	50.32%	49.68%
- Bennett: 50–60% Naudain: 50–60%
Governor before election
David Hazzard
National Republican
Elected Governor
Caleb P. Bennett
Democratic

The 1832 Delaware gubernatorial election was held on November 6, 1832. This was the first gubernatorial election held under the 1831 constitution, which moved the state's general elections to November and extended the Governor's three-year term to four years, but preserved the bar on governors from succeeding themselves. Incumbent National Republican Governor David Hazzard was barred from seeking a second term. New Castle County Treasurer Caleb P. Bennett ran as the Democratic candidate to succeed Hazzard, while former State Representative Arnold Naudain ran as the National Republican candidate. Bennett narrowly defeated Naudain, winning by a margin of just 54 votes.

== General election ==
=== Results ===
1832 Delaware gubernatorial election
Party	Candidate	Votes	%	±%
Democratic	Caleb P. Bennett	4,220	50.32%	+1.34%
National Republican	Arnold Naudain	4,166	49.68%	−1.34%
Majority		54	0.64%	−1.40%
Turnout		8,386	100.00%	
Democratic gain from National Republican				

== Bibliography ==
- Gubernatorial Elections, 1787-1997. Washington, D.C.: Congressional Quarterly Inc. 1998. ISBN 1-56802-396-0.
- Glashan, Roy R. (1979). American Governors and Gubernatorial Elections, 1775-1978. Meckler Books. ISBN 0-930466-17-9.
- Dubin, Michael J. (2003). United States Gubernatorial Elections, 1776-1860: The Official Results by State and County. Jefferson, North Carolina: McFarland. ISBN 978-0-7864-1439-0.
