= David Hazzard =

American politician (1781–1864)

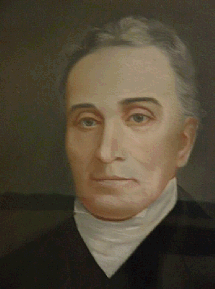

Associate Justice of Superior Court
- In office December 10, 1844 – September 16, 1847
- Preceded by: Caleb S. Layton
- Succeeded by: Edward Wooten

Member of the Delaware Senate
- In office January 7, 1835 - January 1, 1839

28th Governor of Delaware
- In office January 19, 1830 – January 15, 1833
- Preceded by: Charles Polk, Jr.
- Succeeded by: Caleb P. Bennett

Personal details
- Born: May 18, 1781 Milton, Delaware
- Died: July 8, 1864 (aged 83) Milton, Delaware
- Party: Democratic-Republican; National Republican; Whig
- Spouse: Elizabeth Collins
- Occupation: Merchant

David Hazzard (May 18, 1781 – July 8, 1864) was an American merchant and politician from Milton, in Sussex County, Delaware. He was a member of the Democratic-Republican Party, then the National Republican Party, and finally the Whig Party. He served in the Delaware General Assembly, as Governor of Delaware, and as an associate justice of the Delaware Superior Court.

== Early life and family ==
Hazzard was born at Broadkill Neck in Sussex County, near Milton, the only son of John and Mary Purnell Houston Hazzard. The family descended from the 17th century English immigrant, Croad Hazzard. John Hazzard was said to have helped ferry the Continental Army across the Delaware River the night before the Battle of Trenton in 1776. He later started a store in Milton. David Hazzard married Elizabeth Collins, sister of Governor John Collins on July 12, 1804, and they had five children, Ann, Maria, John Alexander, William Asbury, and David. They lived at 327 Union Street in Milton in a home built in the late 18th century. It is now a bed and breakfast. They were members of the Goshen Methodist Church when it was located on Chestnut Street in Milton.

== Professional and political career ==
Hazzard was appointed a lieutenant of Delaware militia on October 14, 1807, but resigned May 28, 1808. On July 4, 1812, with the coming of the War of 1812, Hazzard was appointed an ensign in the Grenadiers attached to Captain Peter T. Wright's First Company of the 8th Regiment of Delaware militia. It was primarily occupied in strengthening the defenses of Lewes, Delaware, and took an active role in its defense in April 1813. It never fought outside Delaware. On April 4, 1814, he was commissioned a Captain. All the while Hazzard was running the family mercantile business in Milton, which now included a granary.

Hazzard was a member of the Jeffersonian Democratic-Republican Party, a minority in Delaware, and particularly in Sussex County. He first gained an appointment as justice of the peace and served from 1812 until 1817. In 1823 he sought election as governor, but lost to Samuel Paynter, the Federalist candidate. He ran again in 1826, and lost, this time to Federalist candidate, Charles Polk, Jr. With the realignment of parties that occurred following that election, Hazzard became an Adams-Clay supporter, much more in line with the majority in Delaware. Accordingly, he won the 1829 election for governor, running as a member of Henry Clay's National Republican Party. He defeated the Jacksonian Democratic Party candidate, Allen Thompson of Wilmington, and served one term from January 19, 1830 until January 15, 1833. A large Anti-Jacksonian majority was also elected to the Delaware General Assembly.

This was a period of great growth and change in Delaware. The new School Law of 1829, called for the creation of school districts in each hundred throughout the state, with small schools placed within two miles of every student. There was some state funding, but the expectation was the localities would supplement it. Many did not. Roads and bridges were improved, and wooden rails were laid on the old New Castle & Frenchtown Turnpike, making it the New Castle & Frenchtown Railroad. It was one of the first railroads in the country and the quickest route of the day from Baltimore to Philadelphia.

A new state constitution was adopted in 1831. This document provided for elections in November, biannual sessions of the Delaware General Assembly, four-year terms for governors and state senators, and two-year terms for state representatives. governors were not allowed to succeed themselves. The judicial system was changed as well, reducing the number of judges from nine to five: a chancellor, a chief justice, and three associate justices. A new charter was written for the City of Wilmington, and it elected its first mayor, Richard H. Bayard. Hazzard was the last governor to serve under the Constitution of 1792.

1831 was also the year of Nat Turner's rebellion in Virginia. This event triggered rumors of other slave revolts, including one in Seaford, Delaware. While there were only about 3,000 slaves in Delaware, there were 16,000 free African-Americans, and the scare resulted in An Act to Prevent the Use of Firearms by Free Negroes and Free Mulattoes. This legislation was encouraged by Hazzard and prohibited the entry into the state of additional free African-Americans, possession of guns without special authorization, unsupervised late night meetings, or unlicensed, itinerant African-American preachers.

Later Hazzard served one term in the Delaware Senate during the 1835/36 and 1837/38 sessions, and on December 10, 1844 became an associate justice of the Delaware Superior Court. He was the only person to have been appointed to a position on the Superior Court without a formal legal education. He was also a member of the 1852 State Constitutional Convention, but resigned protesting the manner in which the delegates were selected. The document prepared by this convention was ultimately rejected when put to a popular vote, because it kept each county's representation equal, thereby giving too little representation to New Castle County.

Delaware General Assembly (sessions while Governor)
Year	Assembly	Senate Majority	Speaker	House Majority	Speaker
1830	54th	National Republican	Presley Spruance	National Republican	Joshua Burton
1831	55th	National Republican	Presley Spruance	National Republican	Joshua Burton
1832	56th	National Republican	James P. Lofland	National Republican	Thomas Davis

== Death and legacy ==
Hazzard died at Milton, and is buried there in the Methodist Episcopal Cemetery. In Milton there is a marker erected in his memory on Governor's Walk along the Broadkill River. Hazzard's son, John Alexander Hazzard served in the Delaware Senate from 1855 through 1858, and another son, David, was a veteran of the Civil War.

Hazzard was an active member of the Methodist Church and as such was a lifelong advocate for social reforms such as the elimination of Delaware's antiquated system of imprisonment for debt. While not a slave holder himself, he concurred with his Sussex County neighbors in defending the property rights of slaveholders and, most importantly, in the rights of individual states to decide for themselves upon questions of the future of slavery. Recognizing the future risk to the union in the resolution of this question, he like most people in Delaware dismissed the possibility of leaving it, saying: "As the people of this state were the first to adopt the present government, they will be the last to abandon it."

The Hazzard House at Milton was added to the National Register of Historic Places in 1973.

== Almanac ==
Elections were held the first Tuesday of October until 1831, and since they have been held on the first Tuesday after November 1. Members of the Delaware General Assembly took office on the first Tuesday of January. The governor took office the third Tuesday of January and had a three-year term. Since 1831, state senators have had a four-year term.

Public Offices
Office	Type	Location	Began office	Ended office	notes
Justice of the Peace	Judiciary	Milton	May 12, 1812	December 8, 1817	
Governor	Executive	Dover	January 19, 1830	January 15, 1833	
State Senator	Legislature	Dover	January 7, 1835	January 1, 1839	
Associate Justice	Judiciary	Dover	December 10, 1844	July 8, 1864	Superior Court
Delegate	Convention	Dover	December 1852	March 1853	State Constitution

Delaware General Assembly service
Dates	Assembly	Chamber	Majority	Governor	Committees	District
1835–1836	58th	State Senate	Whig	Caleb Bennett		Sussex at-large
1837–1838	59th	State Senate	Whig	Cornelius P. Comegys		Sussex at-large

Election results
Year	Office	Subject	Party	Votes	%	Opponent	Party	Votes	%
1823	Governor	David Hazzard	Democratic-Republican	4,051	48%	Samuel Paynter	Federalist	4,348	52%
1826	Governor	David Hazzard	Democratic-Republican	4,238	49%	Charles Polk, Jr.	Federalist	4,333	51%
1829	Governor	David Hazzard	National Republican	4,215	51%	Allen Thompson	Democratic	4,046	49%

== Images ==
- Hall of Governors Portrait Gallery Portrait courtesy of Historical and Cultural Affairs, Dover

Party political offices
Preceded by Joseph Haslet	Democratic-Republican nominee for Governor of Delaware; 1823, 1826	Succeeded by None
First	National Republican nominee for Governor of Delaware; 1829	Succeeded by None
Political offices
Preceded by Charles Polk Jr.	Governor of Delaware; 1830–1833	Succeeded by Caleb P. Bennett
