= 1928 Delaware gubernatorial election =

- November 6, 1928
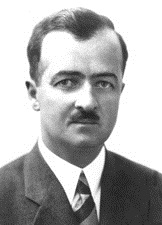

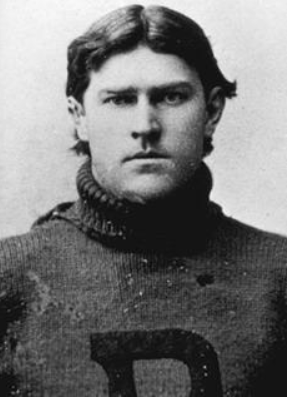
Nominee	C. Douglass Buck	Charles M. Wharton
Party	Republican	Democratic
Popular vote	62,683	40,824
Percentage	60.56%	39.44%
- County results Buck: 50–60% 60–70% Wharton: 50–60%
Governor before election
Robert P. Robinson
Republican
Elected Governor
C. Douglass Buck
Republican

The 1928 Delaware gubernatorial election was held on November 6, 1928. Republican Governor Robert P. Robinson declined to seek a second term so C. Douglass Buck, the Chief Engineer of the State Highway Department, was seen as the likely frontrunner heading into the Republican convention. At the convention, Buck's primary opponent was State Senator I. Dolphus Short, whom he defeated by a wide margin, receiving 104 votes to Short's 54.

On the Democratic side, former State Senator Charles Wharton, a well-known football player on the Penn Quakers team at the University of Pennsylvania, emerged as the frontrunner. Wharton was seen as a strong candidate by the Democratic establishment and won the nomination unopposed.

However, despite Wharton's reputation and his strength as a candidate, he proved little obstacle to Buck. Republican presidential nominee Herbert Hoover won the state in a record-breaking landslide and helped Buck across the finish line. Though Buck underperformed Hoover, he still won handily, winning 61% of the vote to Wharton's 39%.

== General election ==
1928 Delaware gubernatorial election
Party	Candidate	Votes	%	±%
Republican	C. Douglass Buck	62,683	60.56%	+1.83%
Democratic	Charles M. Wharton	40,824	39.44%	−0.63%
Majority		21,859	21.12%	+2.46%
Turnout		103,507	100.00%	
Republican hold				

== Bibliography ==
- Dubin, Michael J. (2013). United States Gubernatorial Elections, 1912-1931: The Official Results by State and County. Jefferson, North Carolina: McFarland & Company, Inc., Publishers. ISBN 978-0-7864-7033-4.
