= John W. Hall =

American politician

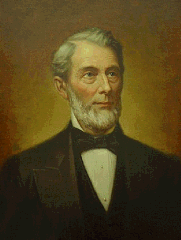

44th Governor of Delaware
- In office January 21, 1879 – January 16, 1883
- Preceded by: John P. Cochran
- Succeeded by: Charles C. Stockley

Member of the Delaware Senate
- In office January 6, 1867 – January 6, 1871
- In office January 6, 1891 – January 23, 1892

Personal details
- Born: January 1, 1817 Frederica, Delaware
- Died: January 23, 1892 (aged 75) Frederica, Delaware
- Party: Democratic
- Spouse: Caroline Warren
- Occupation: Merchant

John Wood Hall (January 1, 1817 – January 23, 1892) was an American merchant and politician from Frederica, in Kent County, Delaware. He was a member of the Democratic Party, who served in the Delaware General Assembly and as Governor of Delaware.

== Early life and family ==
Hall was born in Frederica, Delaware, son of John and Henrietta Bowman Hall. He married Caroline Warren in 1842 and had four children: John Wood, Jr., Samuel Warren, Sarah Henrietta, and Caroline. They lived at 8 David Street in Frederica and were members of the Methodist Church.

Orphaned as a child, Hall worked in a candy store, and eventually saved enough money to buy the business. Not stopping with candy, he expanded into general merchandising and lumber, and then started building his own ships. In time, he had one of the largest fleets of sailing ships on the east coast, all built in Delaware. With his earnings he began buying land and ended up with over 6,000 acres (24 km^{2}) on 20 farms, becoming one of the largest landowners in the state.

== Professional and political career ==
Hall served in the Delaware Senate during the 1867/68 session and the 1869/70 session. In 1874 he was nearly nominated for governor, but it was New Castle County's turn in the informal rotation. Finally, in 1878 he was elected Governor of Delaware, overwhelmingly defeating Kensey J. Steward, the Greenback Labor candidate. Leftover bitterness from the Civil War caused the Democratic Party to be so completely in control that the Republican Party did not even hold a convention or field a candidate. Hall served from January 21, 1879, until January 16, 1883.

The Democratic Party was the conservative party of the day, and accordingly Hall supported conservative positions. He was a strong supporter of states' rights in opposition to the increasing reach of the federal government. Then that reach was generally in support of racial equality, a concept strongly opposed by Democrats in Delaware. Hall did support the setting up of a separate state Board of Education, and an office of Insurance Commissioner. All the while he was governor he was also a director of the Farmers' Bank of Delaware, having served from 1861 until he left office in 1883. After several years out of office he returned to the Delaware Senate for the 1891/92 and 1893/94 sessions, serving there until his death.

Delaware General Assembly (sessions while Governor)
Year	Assembly	Senate Majority	Speaker	House Majority	Speaker
1879–1880	80th	Democratic	Charles J. Harrington	Democratic	Swithin Chandler
1881–1882	81st	Democratic	Cateby F. Rust	Democratic	Reynear Williams

== Death and legacy ==
Hall died at Frederica and is buried near there at Barratt's Chapel Cemetery. His home at Frederica is a contributing property in the Frederica Historic District.

== Almanac ==
Elections are held the first Tuesday after November 1. Members of the Delaware General Assembly took office the first Tuesday of January. State senators have a four-year term. The governor takes office the third Tuesday of January and has a four-year term.

Public Offices
Office	Type	Location	Began office	Ended office	notes
State Senator	Legislature	Dover	January 6, 1867	January 6, 1871	
Governor	Executive	over	January 21, 1879	January 16, 1883	
State Senator	Legislature	Dover	January 6, 1891	January 6, 1895	

Delaware General Assembly service
Dates	Assembly	Chamber	Majority	Governor	Committees	District
1867–1868	74th	State Senate	Democratic	Gove Saulsbury		Kent at-large
1869–1870	75th	State Senate	Democratic	Gove Saulsbury		Kent at-large
1891–1892	86th	State Senate	Democratic	Robert J. Reynolds		Kent at-large
1893–1894	87th	State Senate	Democratic	Robert J. Reynolds		Kent at-large

Election results
Year	Office	Subject	Party	Votes	%	Opponent	Party	Votes	%
1878	Governor	John W. Hall	Democratic	10,730	79%	Kensey J. Stewart	Greenback Labor	2,835	21%

== Images ==
- Hall of Governors Portrait Gallery. Portrait courtesy of Historical and Cultural Affairs, Dover

== Places with more information ==
- Delaware Historical Society; website; 505 North Market Street, Wilmington, Delaware 19801; (302) 655-7161
- University of Delaware; Library website; 181 South College Avenue, Newark, Delaware 19717; (302) 831-2965

Party political offices
Preceded by John P. Cochran	Democratic nominee for Governor of Delaware; 1878	Succeeded by Charles C. Stockley
Political offices
Preceded by John P. Cochran	Governor of Delaware; 1879–1883	Succeeded by Charles C. Stockley
