= 1823 Delaware gubernatorial special election =

- October 7, 1823
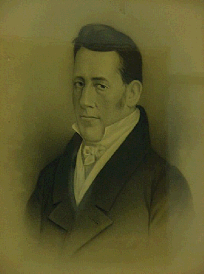

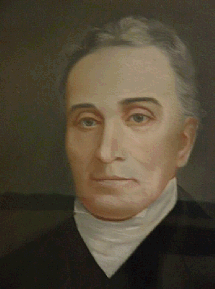
Nominee	Samuel Paynter	David Hazzard
Party	Federalist	Democratic-Republican
Popular vote	4,348	4,051
Percentage	51.77%	48.23%
- Paynter: 50–60% 60–70% Hazzard: 60–70%
Governor before election
Charles Thomas
Democratic-Republican
Elected Governor
Samuel Paynter
Federalist

The 1823 Delaware gubernatorial special election was held on October 7, 1823. A few months into his three-year term, Democratic-Republican Governor Joseph Haslet died in office, elevating State Senate Speaker Charles Thomas to the governorship and triggering a special election in 1823. Justice of the Peace David Hazzard ran as the Democratic-Republican nominee to succeed Thomas and faced State Senator Samuel Paynter, the Federalist nominee. Paynter narrowly defeated Hazzard, regaining the office for the Federalists.

== General election ==
=== Results ===
1823 Delaware gubernatorial special election
Party	Candidate	Votes	%	±%
Federalist	Samuel Paynter	4,348	51.77%	+1.91%
Democratic-Republican	David Hazzard	4,051	48.23%	−1.91%
Majority		297	3.54%	+3.24%
Turnout		8,399	100.00%	
Federalist gain from Democratic-Republican				

== Bibliography ==
- Gubernatorial Elections, 1787-1997. Washington, D.C.: Congressional Quarterly Inc. 1998. ISBN 1-56802-396-0.
- Glashan, Roy R. (1979). American Governors and Gubernatorial Elections, 1775-1978. Meckler Books. ISBN 0-930466-17-9.
- Dubin, Michael J. (2003). United States Gubernatorial Elections, 1776-1860: The Official Results by State and County. Jefferson, North Carolina: McFarland. ISBN 978-0-7864-1439-0.
