= Caleb P. Bennett =

American politician (1758–1836)

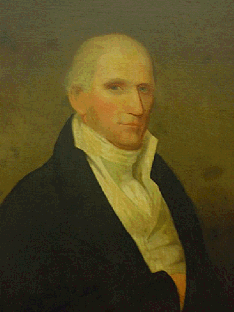

29th Governor of Delaware
- In office January 15, 1833 – May 9, 1836
- Preceded by: David Hazzard
- Succeeded by: Charles Polk, Jr.

Personal details
- Born: November 11, 1758 Chester County, Province of Pennsylvania
- Died: May 9, 1836 (aged 77) Wilmington, Delaware
- Party: Democratic
- Spouse: Catherine Britton
- Occupation: soldier

Caleb Prew Bennett (November 11, 1758 – May 9, 1836) was an American soldier and politician from Wilmington, in New Castle County, Delaware. He was a veteran of the American Revolutionary War and the War of 1812, and a member of the Democratic Party who served as Governor of Delaware.

== Early life and family ==
Bennett was born in Chester County, Pennsylvania, the son of Joseph and Elizabeth Prew Willey Bennett. They moved to Wilmington when he was three years old. His father was a ship captain who sailed to the West Indies. Caleb Bennett married Catherine Britton in 1792 and they had thirteen children, Samuel Britton, Elizabeth, Caroline, Mary Ann, Henry Lisle, Livina, Joseph Eves, Susan, Charles Webb, William, Catherine, Edwin Ruthven, and Boadicea. They lived at 841 Market Street in Wilmington and were members of the Wilmington Friends Meeting.

== Military career ==
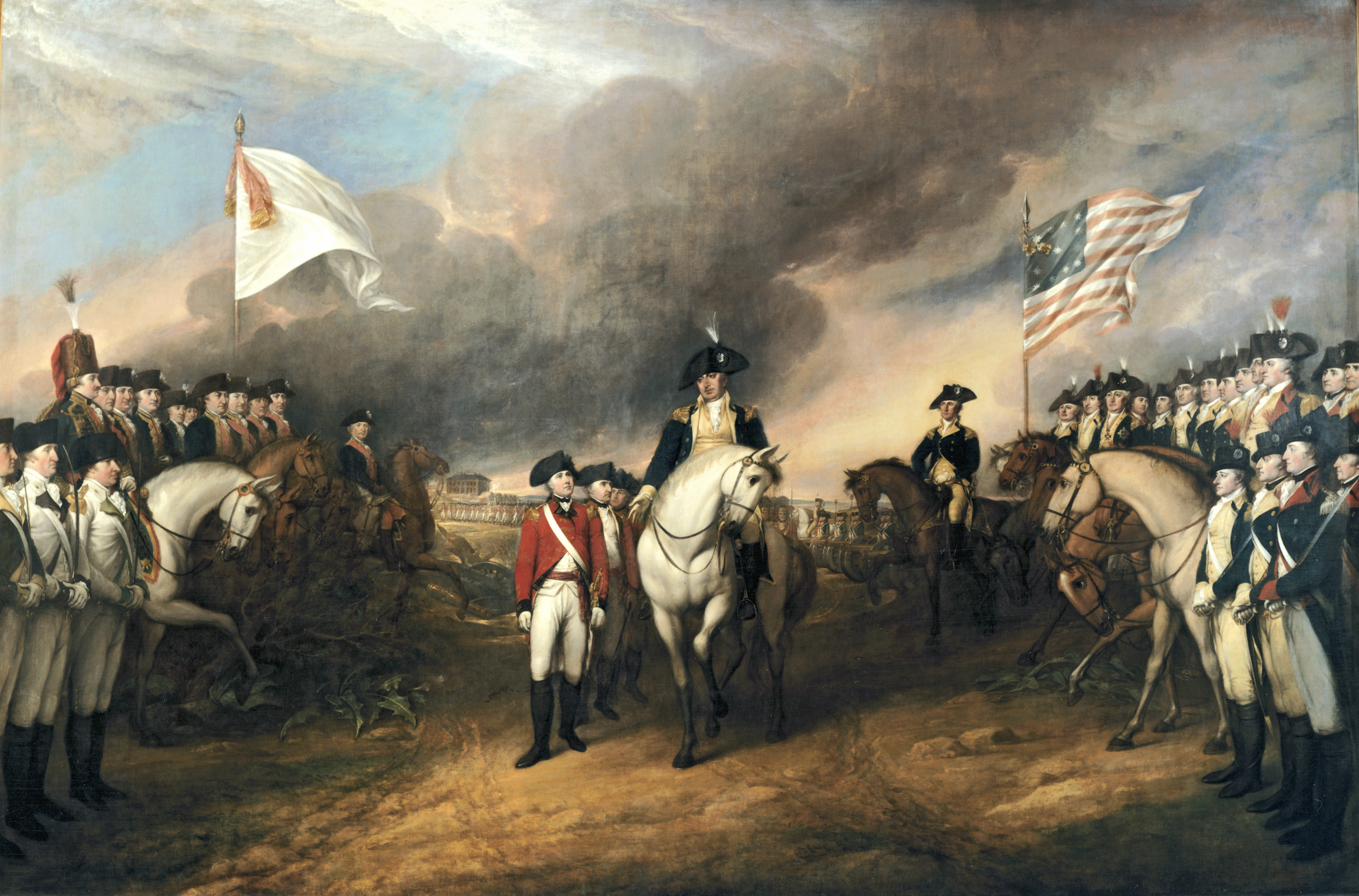
Surrender of Lord Cornwallis, John Trumbull

Bennett served as a lieutenant in the 1st Delaware Regiment, a unit of the Continental Army during the American Revolutionary War. He enlisted as a 17-year-old in 1775, and served throughout the war. Present at Valley Forge and the battles of Staten Island, Brandywine, Germantown, Monmouth, Camden, and Yorktown, he was wounded three times. After the disastrous Battle of Camden in August 1780, when the 1st Delaware Regiment was decimated, Lt. Bennett was sent back to Delaware to recruit. A year later, as General George Washington and the French were gathering everyone possible for the Siege of Yorktown, Bennett rejoined the army, and recalled it as follows:

“We remained at our post at Christeen (Cristiana), performing the duties required, until the French Army from Rhode Island, and other detachments of the army, with the commander-in-chief at their head, arrived at our rendezvous in the month of August, when we received orders from General Washington to prepare to follow on to Virginia. In a few days we took up our line of march for Baltimore; we remained in that city for some days, when small craft was prepared for our reception to proceed to Annapolis, where the French transports were waiting for the French army to embark.

On our arrival at Annapolis we embarked also, on board the Marquis Lafayette. When the troops were all on board, the fleet of transports, with two frigates, weighed anchor and preceded, with a fair wind, down the Chesapeake Bay till we arrived at Linhaven Bay, where the French fleet were moored. We passed the mouth of the York River, where lay two or three French frigates blockading the entrance. We lay that night at anchor with the fleet.

Early next morning the transports proceeded up the James River (all this time with a fair wind) until we arrived in the neighborhood of Williamsburg, Virginia, where we landed and joined the troops assembled there.

As soon as the troops had all concentrated, with General Washington at their head, we left Williamsburg and proceeded on our route for Yorktown, where the British troops had fortified themselves, under the command of Lord Cornwallis. The whole army arrived in the evening and took possession of the ground around the town, driving in their outpost, which we affected without much loss or inconvenience on our part; accomplished the end we had in view, that was to form our camp so as to encircle the whole outworks.”

After the surrender Bennett's orderly book noted that on “November 4, 1781 we joined General Gist’s Brigade, and began our march to join General Greene’s army in South Carolina.” Bennett served for two more years in South Carolina, finally returning home January 17, 1783.

During the War of 1812 he was Captain of the Artillery and Commander of the town of New Castle. According to Scharf, Bennett “was placed in control of measures to be taken at New Castle and the battery that was erected close to the town. He was made colonel of the militia and soon had a well-disciplined force of infantry and artillery.” But all did not go well for the veteran soldier. Brigadier General and Whig political rival John Stockton brought Bennett to a courts martial for failing to perform his duty. The charges were not proved, and the ever-popular Bennett was acquitted.

== Governor of Delaware ==
In the mid 19th century politics in Delaware were divided between the majority Whigs and minority Democrats. The Whigs were the party in opposition to U.S. President Andrew Jackson, his political successors and their policies. They were for a strong Union, good banks and a protective tariff. As the primary heirs to the old Federalist Party in Delaware, their greatest strength was among the old stock, rural, agricultural population in Kent and Sussex County. Conversely, the Democrats were in support of Jacksonian policies, and found their strength in New Castle County and among Quakers, Ulster-Scots and the more recent immigrants.

Bennett speculated in various businesses, including the ferry service across the Christiana River at Wilmington and the Governor Bedford house on the Strand in New Castle, which he turned into a hotel. He also served as treasurer of New Castle County from 1806 to 1832. Having never sought political office previously, he was drafted by the Democrats, desperate to break the Federalist/Whig stranglehold on the governorship. In spite of his venerable veteran status, he was elected governor in 1832 by only 54 votes, defeating U.S. Senator Arnold Naudain, the Whig candidate. Serving from January 15, 1833 until his death in office on July 11, 1836, Bennett was the oldest person ever to start a term as governor in Delaware. He was also the first governor elected under the Delaware Constitution of 1831 and, therefore, the first elected to a four-year term.

Delaware General Assembly (sessions while Governor)
Year	Assembly	Senate Majority	Speaker	House Majority	Speaker
1833–1834	57th	National Republican	Joshua Burton	National Republican	John Raymond
1835–1836	58th	Whig	Charles Polk, Jr.	Whig	William D. Waples

For years Delaware's governors had pleaded with the General Assembly to reform the state's penal system. Carol Hoffecker in Democracy in Delaware relates how Bennett continued the effort, asking the General Assembly in 1835 to "abolish imprisonment for debt, and the pillory, which yet remains a stigma to our county towns, and a disgrace to the statutes of the state in an age otherwise characterized by intelligence, progress and philanthropy." Regardless of his efforts, nothing was changed.

Hoffecker also describes how, in the increasingly highly charged national debate over the tariff and states rights, Bennett "denounced South Carolina's attempt to nullify a federal tariff. He called the nullification doctrine a rebellion based on "heresy. It was in union," he reminded his audience, "that we wrested our liberties from the grasp of oppression. The union is our whole strength, our sole support."

Internal improvements continued during this period. The federal government assisted in the building of much needed breakwaters at Lewes, the Frenchtown & New Castle Railroad replaced its wooden rails with steel so they could support a new steam engine, and construction began on the Philadelphia, Baltimore and Wilmington Railroad and the Delaware Railroad.

== Death and legacy ==
Bennett died at Wilmington, while in office, and is buried there in the Friends Burial Ground, at Fourth and West Streets. He was the fifth Governor of Delaware to die in office.

U.S. Representative William G. Whiteley remembered Bennett near the end of his life as

"a tall spare old man wearing knee breeches. He lived in Wilmington in a house...and could be seen any summer afternoon sitting upon his front pavement engaged in what we boys did not think a very manly employment, knitting yarn stockings."

Others noted,

"Notwithstanding his Jacksonian Democracy, and being a Quaker to boot, to the end of his life he wore ruffled shirts, white kid breeches, and a velvet coat with brass buttons. He also powdered his hair and wore a queue."

== Almanac ==
Elections are held on the first Tuesday after November 1. The governor takes office the third Tuesday in January, and has a four-year term.

Public offices
Office	Type	Location	Took office	Left office	Notes
Governor	Executive	Dover	January 15, 1833	July 11, 1836	died in office

Election results
Year	Office	Subject	Party	Votes	%	Opponent	Party	Votes	%
1832	Governor	Caleb P. Bennett	Democratic	4,220	50%	Arnold Naudain	National Republican	4,166	50%

== Images ==
- Hall of Governors Portrait Gallery, Portrait courtesy of Historical and Cultural Affairs, Dover

== Places with more information ==
- Delaware Historical Society; website; 505 North Market Street, Wilmington, Delaware 19801; (302) 655-7161
- University of Delaware; Library website; 181 South College Avenue, Newark, Delaware 19717; (302) 831-2965

== Notes ==
- Conrad, Henry C. (1908). History of the State of Delaware. Lancaster, Pennsylvania: Wickersham Company.
- Hoffecker, Carol E. (2004). Democracy in Delaware. Wilmington, Delaware: Cedar Tree Books. ISBN 1-892142-23-6.
- Martin, Roger A. (1984). History of Delaware Through its Governors. Wilmington, Delaware: McClafferty Press.
- Martin, Roger A. (1995). Memoirs of the Senate. Newark, Delaware.
- Scharf, John Thomas (1888). History of Delaware 1609-1888. 2 vols. Philadelphia: L. J. Richards & Co.
- Ward, Christopher L. (1941). Delaware Continentals, 1776-1783. Wilmington, DE: Historical Society of Delaware. ISBN 0-924117-21-4.

Party political offices
Preceded by Allen Thompson	Democratic nominee for Governor of Delaware; 1832	Succeeded by Nehemiah Clark
Political offices
Preceded by David Hazzard	Governor of Delaware; 1833–1836	Succeeded by Charles Polk, Jr.
