= Samuel Paynter =

American politician (1768–1845)

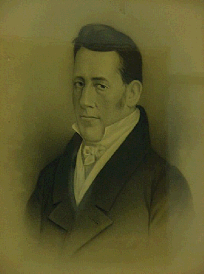

26th Governor of Delaware
- In office January 20, 1824 – January 16, 1827
- Preceded by: Charles Thomas
- Succeeded by: Charles Polk Jr.

Member of the Delaware Senate
- In office January 3, 1807 – January 6, 1813; January 7, 1823 – January 6, 1824

Member of the Delaware House of Representatives
- In office January 3, 1797 – January 6, 1801

Personal details
- Born: August 24, 1768 Sussex County, Delaware Colony
- Died: October 2, 1845 (aged 77) Lewes, Delaware
- Party: Federalist
- Spouse: Elizabeth Rowland
- Occupation: Merchant

Samuel Paynter (August 24, 1768 – October 2, 1845) was an American merchant and politician from Drawbridge, in Broadkill Hundred, Sussex County, Delaware. He was a member of the Federalist Party, who served in the Delaware General Assembly and as Governor of Delaware.

== Early life and family ==
Paynter was born at Drawbridge in Broadkill Hundred, Sussex County, Delaware, son of Samuel and Meritta Hazzard Paynter. His ancestor, Richard Paynter came to Lewes, Delaware before 1700, and his grandfather, Samuel Paynter, bought land in Broadkill Hundred in 1732. Samuel, our subject, married Elizabeth Rowland in 1796 and they had six children, Mary, Elizabeth, Sally, Samuel Rowland, John Parker, and Alfred Shockley. They were members of St. Peter's Episcopal Church in Lewes.

== Professional and political career ==
Drawbridge, as its name suggests, was the point at which land traffic crossed the Broadkill River, about halfway from Milton to the Delaware Bay. It is where State Route 1 crosses the Broadkill River today. Paynter's father, another Samuel, established a general store there. The business was quite successful, and made the family wealthy enough for Samuel Jr. to be a director of the Farmer's Bank at Georgetown for 25 years.

Paynter was a member of the Federalist Party like the majority in Sussex County. While elsewhere the Federalists were declining as an effective political force, in lower Delaware they organized themselves well, and were far more acceptable to the agrarian, Anglican and Methodist establishment, than the Irish Presbyterians who dominated the majority Democratic-Republican Party in very different New Castle County. Statewide elections were competitive, but the three counties were similar in population, and so the Federalists almost always won, both in the General Assembly and governorship.

Paynter was, therefore, in the majority in his long years of experience in the Delaware General Assembly. Elected first in 1796, he served in the state house for four sessions from 1797 through 1800. He was then elected to the state senate in 1806 and served in seven sessions from 1807 through 1813. Finally, he served in the state senate again in the 1823 session. Defeating his neighbor from Milton, David Hazzard, the Democratic-Republican candidate, Paynter was elected Governor of Delaware in 1823 and served from January 20, 1824 until January 16, 1827. During his tenure as governor construction finally began on the new Chesapeake and Delaware Canal. After his term ended he returned to his home and mercantile business at Drawbridge.

Delaware General Assembly (sessions while Governor)
Year	Assembly	Senate Majority	Speaker	House Majority	Speaker
1824	48th	Federalist	Jesse Green	Federalist	Joshua Burton
1825	49th	Federalist	Jesse Green	Federalist	Joshua Burton
1826	50th	Federalist	Charles Polk Jr.	Federalist	Arnold S. Naudain

== Death and legacy ==
Paynter died at Drawbridge in Broadkill Hundred, Sussex County, and is buried in the St. Peter's Episcopal Churchyard at Lewes. His son, Samuel R. Paynter, also served in the Delaware General Assembly.

== Almanac ==
Elections were held the first Tuesday of October. Members of the Delaware General Assembly took office the first Tuesday of January. State senators had a three-year term and state representatives had a one-year term. The governor takes office the third Tuesday of January and had a three-year term.

Public Offices
Office	Type	Location	Began office	Ended office	notes
State Representative	Legislature	Dover	January 3, 1797	January 2, 1798	
State Representative	Legislature	Dover	January 2, 1798	January 1, 1799	
State Representative	Legislature	Dover	January 1, 1799	January 7, 1800	
State Representative	Legislature	Dover	January 7, 1800	January 6, 1801	
State Senator	Legislature	Dover	January 6, 1807	January 2, 1810	
State Senator	Legislature	Dover	January 2, 1810	January 5, 1813	
State Treasurer	Executive	Dover	January 2, 1817	January 5, 1818	
Associate Justice	Judiciary	Dover	February 14, 1818	October 6, 1820	State Supreme Court
State Senator	Legislature	Dover	January 7, 1823	January 6, 1824	
Governor	Executive	Dover	January 20, 1824	January 16, 1827	

Delaware General Assembly service
Dates	Assembly	Chamber	Majority	Governor	Committees	District
1797	21st	State House	Federalist	Gunning Bedford Sr.		Sussex at-large
1798	22nd	State House	Federalist	Daniel Rogers		Sussex at-large
1799	23rd	State House	Federalist	Richard Bassett		Sussex at-large
1800	24th	State House	Federalist	Richard Bassett		Sussex at-large
1807	31st	State Senate	Federalist	Nathaniel Mitchell		Sussex at-large
1808	32nd	State Senate	Federalist	George Truitt		Sussex at-large
1809	33rd	State Senate	Federalist	George Truitt		Sussex at-large
1810	34th	State Senate	Federalist	George Truitt		Sussex at-large
1811	35th	State Senate	Federalist	Joseph Haslet		Sussex at-large
1812	36th	State Senate	Federalist	Joseph Haslet		Sussex at-large
1823	47th	State Senate	Federalist	Joseph Haslet		Sussex at-large

Election results
Year	Office	Subject	Party	Votes	%	Opponent	Party	Votes	%
1823	Governor	Samuel Paynter	Federalist	4,348	52%	David Hazzard	Democratic-Republican	4,051	48%

== Images ==
- Hall of Governors Portrait Gallery Portrait courtesy of Historical and Cultural Affairs, Dover.

Party political offices
Preceded by James Booth	Federalist nominee for Governor of Delaware; 1823	Succeeded by Charles Polk Jr.
Political offices
Preceded by Charles Thomas	Governor of Delaware; 1824–1827	Succeeded by Charles Polk Jr.
