= Charles Polk Jr. =

American politician (1788–1857)

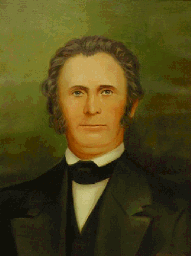

27th and 30th Governor of Delaware
- In office May 9, 1836 – January 17, 1837
- Preceded by: Caleb P. Bennett
- Succeeded by: Cornelius P. Comegys
- In office January 16, 1827 – January 19, 1830
- Preceded by: Samuel Paynter
- Succeeded by: David Hazzard

Member of the Delaware Senate
- In office January 4, 1825 – January 16, 1827; January 6, 1835 – January 3, 1843

Member of the Delaware House of Representatives
- In office January 4, 1814 – January 2, 1816; January 6, 1818 – January 5, 1819; January 6, 1824 – January 4, 1825

Personal details
- Born: November 15, 1788 Bridgeville, Delaware
- Died: October 27, 1857 (aged 68) Milford, Delaware
- Party: Federalist; Whig
- Spouse: Mary Elizabeth Purnell
- Occupation: Farmer

Charles Polk Jr. (November 15, 1788 – October 27, 1857) was an American farmer and politician from Big Stone Beach, in Milford Hundred, Kent County, Delaware. He was a member of the Federalist Party, and later the Whig Party, who served in the Delaware General Assembly and twice as governor of Delaware.

== Early life and education ==
Polk was born near Bridgeville, Delaware, son of Charles and Mary Manlove Polk. The Polk family originally came from Scotland and U.S. President James K. Polk was a distant cousin. Robert Polk settled in Somerset County, in the Province of Maryland, in 1660 and the Delaware family descended from him. Charles Polk Sr. was a veteran of the American Revolution, serving in Colonel David Hall's regiment in 1777. He was a large landowner in the Bridgeville area, served eight years in the State House, and was a member of the Delaware Constitutional Convention of 1792.

After his father's death in 1795, Charles Jr. attended Westtown Boarding School in Chester County, Pennsylvania, and then studied law with Kensey Johns Sr., but never practiced. By 1812, he was the owner of the Knife and Fork Tavern near Bridgeville, Delaware.

== Career ==
=== Political career ===
Polk was a member of the Federalist Party, which was the majority party in Kent and Sussex County, but was nearly matched in popularity statewide by the Democratic-Republican Party because of that party's strength in New Castle County. As a result, statewide elections were usually close and hard-fought. Delaware was the last state in the country to have an effective Federalist Party, it having virtually disappeared everywhere else. By 1827, members of the old Jeffersonian Democratic-Republican Party had split into a Jacksonian, or Democratic faction or an Adams/Clay faction, known initially as the National Republicans, and later as Whigs. The remaining Federalists, which were many in Delaware, did likewise.

Polk and most of the Federalists in Delaware joined the Adams/Clay faction, and began a National Republican, then Whig ascendancy in Delaware politics. Like the Federalists, the Whigs were especially strong in Kent and Sussex County, but were nearly matched by the new Democratic Party majority in New Castle. The upstate /downstate competition continued as before, just under new names.

Polk first represented Sussex County, and served two terms in the State House in the 1814 and 1815 sessions. After moving to Kent County he was elected to the State House again, this time from Kent County. He served two more terms in the 1818 and 1824 sessions. Polk was also elected to the Kent County Levy Court in 1819. In 1824 he was elected to the State Senate and served one term including the 1825, 1826 and 1827 sessions. He was the Speaker in the 1826 session.

In 1826, the Federalist Party selected Polk as their candidate for governor, and after a hard-fought campaign, he was elected, narrowly defeating the Democratic-Republican candidate, David Hazzard. He served one term as governor of Delaware from January 16, 1827, to January 19, 1830.

Legislation was passed in 1829 that called for the creation of school districts in each hundred throughout the state, with small schools placed within two miles of every student. This was an ambitious and creative plan to improve secondary education developed and promoted by Willard Hall, then the United States district judge for Delaware. There was some state funding, but the expectation was the localities would supplement it. Many did not.

During Polk's term declining agricultural yields due to worn out soil were a matter of great concern. To address the concern, the Delaware General Assembly hired an expert from the Franklin Institute in Philadelphia, who provided a good deal of helpful advice on the use of fertilizers. As it happened, the construction of the Chesapeake and Delaware Canal was beginning, and some farmers in New Castle County realized the marl obtained from the dredging would enrich their soil. Using this soil, the first peach trees were planted near Delaware City.

Regrettably, many thought the problem lay elsewhere. No doubt, reflecting this thinking Polk, as governor in 1837, blamed the problem on inadequate labor, saying the problem lay with "the wretched condition of the colored population which infests the state...irresponsible, lawless, and miserable...a migratory tribe without fixed abode, alternatively roving from city to country." He and others were concerned about the large number of free African-Americans and rather than addressing the issue directly, sought to restrict their entry into Delaware.

Delaware General Assembly (sessions while Governor)
| Year | Assembly | Senate majority | Speaker | House majority | Speaker |
|---|---|---|---|---|---|
| 1827 | 51st | Federalist | Henry Whiteley | Federalist | Archibald Hamilton |
| 1828 | 52nd | Federalist | Presley Spruance | Federalist | William W. Morris |
| 1829 | 53rd | National Republican | Presley Spruance | National Republican | William W. Morris; John Raymond |
| 1835–1836 | 58th | Whig | vacant | Whig | William D. Waples |

==== Constitution of 1831 ====
A new state constitution was adopted in 1831. Polk was the President of the convention that adopted it, but the real leader of the conclave was Polk's former Secretary of State and good personal friend, U.S. Senator John M. Clayton. This document provided for elections in November, biannual sessions of the Delaware General Assembly, four-year terms for governors and state senators, and two-year terms for state representatives. Governors were not allowed to succeed themselves. The judicial system was changed as well, reducing the number of judges from nine to five: a chancellor, a chief justice, and three associate justices.

After his initial term as governor, Polk was again elected to the State Senate in 1834, and served in the 1835/36 session as Speaker. As the governor's constitutional successor, he became governor again upon the death of Governor Caleb P. Bennett and served the remaining months of Bennett's term from July 11, 1836, until January 17, 1837. Polk then returned to his seat in the State Senate, served in the 1837/38 session, and was reelected for the 1839/40 and 1841/42 sessions. He was once again Speaker in the 1841/42 session.

Polk served as Register of Wills for Kent County from 1843 until 1848, and in 1850, moved to Wilmington, when U.S. President John Tyler brought him out of retirement to spend three years as the Collector for the Port of Wilmington. Finally, he was appointed Commissioner-Judge of the Delaware Supreme Court in August 1857.

== Personal life ==
He married Mary Elizabeth Purnell and they had nine children, including, Charles, William Alexander, and Theodore. In 1816 Polk purchased a large tract of land at Big Stone Beach, near Milford, in what is now Milford Hundred, in Kent County, Delaware. He established his residence there on Delaware Bay. They were members of the Presbyterian Church.

== Death and legacy ==
Polk died at his home at Big Stone Beach, Delaware, in Milford Hundred, Kent County, and is buried in the Old Presbyterian Cemetery, in Dover, on the grounds of the Delaware State Museum. His son, William A. Polk, served as the speaker of the State House in the 1867/68 session.

== Almanac ==
Elections were held the first Tuesday of October. Members of the Delaware General Assembly took office the first Tuesday of January. State senators had a three-year term and state representatives had a one-year term. The governor took office the third Tuesday of January and had a three-year term.

After 1831, elections were held the first Tuesday after November 1. In addition, the terms of state senators were increased to four years, the terms of state representatives were increased to two years, and the term of the governor was increased to four years.

Public offices
| Office | Type | Location | Began office | Ended office | Notes |
|---|---|---|---|---|---|
| State Representative | Legislature | Dover | January 4, 1814 | January 3, 1815 | |
| State Representative | Legislature | Dover | January 3, 1815 | January 2, 1816 | |
| State Representative | Legislature | Dover | January 6, 1818 | January 5, 1819 | |
| State Representative | Legislature | Dover | January 6, 1824 | January 4, 1825 | |
| State Senator | Legislature | Dover | January 4, 1825 | January 16, 1827 | |
| Governor | Executive | Dover | January 16, 1827 | January 19, 1830 | |
| Delegate | Convention | Dover | November 1831 | December 2, 1831 | State Constitution |
| State Senator | Legislature | Dover | January 6, 1835 | January 1, 1839 | |
| Governor | Executive | Dover | July 11, 1836 | January 19, 1837 | acting |
| State Senator | Legislature | Dover | January 1, 1839 | January 3, 1843 | |
| Register of Wills | Executive | Dover | 1843 | 1848 | |
| Collector | Executive | Wilmington | 1850 | 1853 | Port of Wilmington |

Delaware General Assembly service
| Dates | Assembly | Chamber | Majority | Governor | Committees | District |
|---|---|---|---|---|---|---|
| 1814 | 38th | State House | Federalist | Daniel Rodney | | Sussex at-large |
| 1815 | 39th | State House | Federalist | Daniel Rodney | | Sussex at-large |
| 1818 | 42nd | State House | Federalist | John Clark | | Kent at-large |
| 1824 | 48th | State House | Federalist | Samuel Paynter | | Kent at-large |
| 1825 | 49th | State Senate | Federalist | Samuel Paynter | | Kent at-large |
| 1826 | 50th | State Senate | Federalist | Samuel Paynter | Speaker | Kent at-large |
| 1835–1836 | 58th | State Senate | Whig | Caleb Bennett | Speaker | Kent at-large |
| 1837–1838 | 59th | State Senate | Whig | Cornelius P. Comegys | | Kent at-large |
| 1839–1840 | 60th | State Senate | Whig | Cornelius P. Comegys | | Kent at-large |
| 1841–1842 | 61st | State Senate | Whig | William B. Cooper | Speaker | Kent at-large |

Election results
| Year | Office | Subject | Party | Votes | % | Opponent | Party | Votes | % |
|---|---|---|---|---|---|---|---|---|---|
| 1826 | Governor | Charles Polk Jr. | Federalist | 4,333 | 51% | David Hazzard | Democratic-Republican | 4,238 | 49% |

== Images ==
- Hall of Governors Portrait Gallery Portrait courtesy of Historical and Cultural Affairs, Dover

Party political offices
| Preceded by Samuel Paynter | Federalist nominee for Governor of Delaware; 1826 | Succeeded by None |
Political offices
| Preceded by Samuel Paynter | Governor of Delaware; 1827–1830 | Succeeded by David Hazzard |
| Preceded by Caleb P. Bennett | Governor of Delaware; 1836–1837 | Succeeded by Cornelius P. Comegys |
