= Cornelius P. Comegys =

American politician (1780–1851)

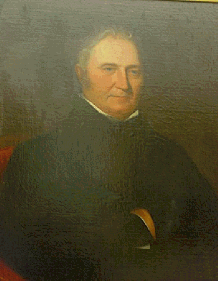

31st Governor of Delaware
- In office January 17, 1837 – January 19, 1841
- Preceded by: Charles Polk, Jr.
- Succeeded by: William B. Cooper

Member of the Delaware House of Representatives
- In office January 1, 1811 - January 7, 1817; January 5, 1830 - January 4, 1831

Personal details
- Born: January 15, 1780 Kent County, Delaware
- Died: January 27, 1851 (aged 71) Dover, Delaware
- Party: Federalist; Whig
- Spouse(s): Ann Blackiston; Ruhamah Marim
- Occupation: Farmer

Military service
- Branch/service: Delaware State Militia
- Rank: Lieutenant Colonel
- Battles/wars: War of 1812

Cornelius Parsons Comegys (January 15, 1780 – January 27, 1851) was an American farmer and politician from Dover Hundred, in Kent County, Delaware, near Little Creek. He was a veteran of the War of 1812, a member of the Federalist Party, and then later the Whig Party, who served in the Delaware General Assembly and as Governor of Delaware.

== Early life and family ==
Comegys was born in Kent County, Maryland, near Chestertown, the son of Cornelius and Hannah Parsons Comegys. His ancestors settled on the Chester River in the 17th century and his father served in Caldwell's Company of John Haslet's Regiment in the American Revolution. Comegys grew up and went to school in Baltimore, Maryland and moved to Little Creek about 1800. There he married Ann Blackiston who died within the year, probably in childbirth. On February 16, 1804, he married secondly, Ruhamah Marim, and they had twelve children, Sally Ann, John Marim, William Henry, Susan Marim, Hannah, Henri Marim, Joseph Parsons, Cornelius George W., Benjamin Bartus, Mary Elizabeth, Maria, and John Marim. They inherited the Marim farm, Cherbourg, now in East Dover Hundred, near Little Creek, and made it their residence. They were members of the Methodist Church.

== Professional career ==
During the War of 1812 Comegys joined the Delaware State Militia and attained the rank of lieutenant-colonel. While farming at Cherbourg, he entered into several other business ventures. As an agent for Brandywine Creek millers he brokered a wheat deal that fell through and nearly ruined him. But he continued to pursue shipping and other mercantile business. For a time he was a director of the Commercial Bank at Smyrna and also Cashier of the Dover Farmers bank in 1818.

== Political career ==
Comegys served in the State House from the 1811 session through the 1815 session, and again in the 1830 session. During the sessions from 1811 through 1814 he was the Speaker. He also served for 13 years as State Treasurer. He was elected governor in 1836, defeating Smyrna surveyor, Nehemiah Clark, the Democratic candidate. He served as Governor of Delaware from January 17, 1837, until January 19, 1841, and was the first person to serve a full four-year term as governor.

Like other governors of his era, he was primarily concerned with improvements to public education and reformation of the penal code. As told by Carol Hoffecker in Democracy in Delaware, Comegys "a man otherwise noted for his reluctance to tamper with the legal code, told the Assembly in 1839, 'I cannot believe that the whipping post and pillory are consistent with the genius of the age.' The governor failed to persuade a majority of the legislature to alter the law, but he used his power of pardon to delete the whipping portion from the sentences of several men convicted of petty thefts. His leniency aroused the ire, not the admiration, of the General Assembly, some of whose members introduced a resolution to restrict the governor's power to pardon on the grounds that 'the frequent exercise of the pardon power is...a great public evil, which threatens seriously to interfere with the due and regular administration of justice. " Two years later he tried again by appealing to public opinion saying to the General Assembly, "The criminal enactments on your statute books are, in the estimation of the people, a mere bug-bear.' He challenged the General Assembly to remove 'the taint of cruelty and barbarism' from the state's criminal code." No laws were changed then and it was only in 1972 that whipping post was eliminated form the legal code. Delaware actually continued to use the whipping post until 1952.

During his term the last link of the Philadelphia, Wilmington and Baltimore Railroad was opened, establishing it as the primary transportation route between Baltimore and Philadelphia. Among other things, this route went through Wilmington and by-passed New Castle, further establishing the dominance of the former city.

Delaware General Assembly (sessions while governor)
| Year | Assembly | Senate Majority | Speaker | House Majority | Speaker |
|---|---|---|---|---|---|
| 1837–1838 | 59th | Whig | Presley Spruance | Whig | William D. Waples |
| 1839–1840 | 60th | Democratic | Thomas Jacobs | Democratic | John P. Brinckloe |

== Death and legacy ==
Comegys died at Dover and is buried there in the Old Methodist or Whatcoat Cemetery. His son, Benjamin, was President of the National Bank in Philadelphia, and another son, Joseph P. Comegys, was Chief Justice of Delaware and a U.S. Senator. Comegys is described "as a man of profuse hospitality...generous to a fault, he aided all who made demands on his charity."

== Almanac ==
Elections were held the first Tuesday of October until 1831, and since they have been held on the first Tuesday after November 1. Members of the Delaware General Assembly took office the first Tuesday of January. State Representatives had a one-year term. The governor takes office the third Tuesday of January and since 1831 has had a four-year term.

Public Offices
| Office | Type | Location | Began office | Ended office | notes |
|---|---|---|---|---|---|
| State Representative | Legislature | Dover | January 1, 1811 | January 7, 1812 | |
| State Representative | Legislature | Dover | January 7, 1812 | January 5, 1813 | |
| State Representative | Legislature | Dover | January 5, 1813 | January 4, 1814 | |
| State Representative | Legislature | Dover | January 4, 1814 | January 3, 1815 | |
| State Representative | Legislature | Dover | January 3, 1815 | January 1, 1816 | |
| State Representative | Legislature | Dover | January 1, 1816 | January 7, 1817 | |
| State Treasurer | Executive | Dover | 1813 | 1821 | |
| State Treasurer | Executive | Dover | 1824 | January 5, 1830 | |
| State Representative | Legislature | Dover | January 5, 1830 | January 4, 1831 | |
| Governor | Executive | Dover | January 17, 1837 | January 19, 1841 | |

Delaware General Assembly service
| Dates | Assembly | Chamber | Majority | Governor | Committees | District |
|---|---|---|---|---|---|---|
| 1811 | 35th | State House | Federalist | Joseph Haslet | Speaker | Kent at-large |
| 1812 | 36th | State House | Federalist | Joseph Haslet | Speaker | Kent at-large |
| 1813 | 37th | State House | Federalist | Joseph Haslet | Speaker | Kent at-large |
| 1814 | 38th | State House | Federalist | Daniel Rodney | Speaker | Kent at-large |
| 1815 | 39th | State House | Federalist | Daniel Rodney | Speaker | Kent at-large |
| 1816 | 40th | State House | Federalist | Daniel Rodney | | Kent at-large |
| 1830 | 54th | State House | National Republican | David Hazzard | | Kent at-large |

Election results
| Year | Office | Subject | Party | Votes | % | Opponent | Party | Votes | % |
|---|---|---|---|---|---|---|---|---|---|
| 1836 | Governor | Cornelius P. Comegys | Whig | 4,693 | 52% | Nehemiah Clark | Democratic | 4,276 | 48% |

== See also ==
- Comegys House

== Images ==
- Hall of Governors Portrait Gallery Portrait courtesy of Historical and Cultural Affairs, Dover.

== Places with more information ==
- Delaware Historical Society; website; 505 North Market Street, Wilmington, Delaware 19801; (302) 655–7161
- University of Delaware; Library website; 181 South College Avenue, Newark, Delaware 19717; (302) 831-2965

Party political offices
| Preceded by Arnold Naudain | Whig nominee for Governor of Delaware; 1836 | Succeeded by William B. Cooper |
Political offices
| Preceded by Charles Polk Jr. | Governor of Delaware; 1837–1841 | Succeeded by William B. Cooper |
