= List of Delaware General Assembly sessions =

List of Delaware state legislatures

This is a list of the sessions of the Delaware General Assembly showing majority parties and leadership for each body and each session. Also included are the corresponding Governors and Lieutenant Governors where applicable. Delaware was one of the 13 colonies of Great Britain that joined the American War of Independence. The General Assembly was formed at that time and has met since then under four state constitutions as indicated.

== Constitution of 1776 ==
Under the Delaware Constitution of 1776 the General Assembly consisted of The Legislative Council and the House of Assembly. There were nine members of the Council, three from each county, and twenty-one members of the Assembly, seven from each county. All members were elected "at-large" from a multi-member district that included their entire county. Elections were held the first day of October, and terms began on the 20th day of October, lasting three years for the Council and one year for the House. Approximately one third of the Senate was elected every year. Sessions were generally held several times every year.

Delaware General Assembly 1776–1792
Year	Assembly	President	Council majority	Speaker	House majority	Speaker
1776/77	1st	John McKinly; Thomas McKean	No parties	George Read	No parties	John McKinly
1777/78	2nd	George Read; Caesar Rodney	No parties	George Read	No parties	Samuel West
1778/79	3rd	Caesar Rodney	No parties	Thomas Collins	No parties	Samuel West
1779/80	4th	Caesar Rodney	No parties	John Clowes	No parties	Simon Kollock
1780/81	5th	Caesar Rodney	No parties	Thomas Collins	No parties	Benjamin Caton
1781/82	6th	Caesar Rodney; John Dickinson	No parties	Thomas Collins	No parties	Simon Kollock
1782/83	7th	John Cook; Nicholas Van Dyke	No parties	John Cook	No parties	Nicholas Van Dyke
1783/84	8th	Nicholas Van Dyke	No parties	Caesar Rodney	No parties	Robert Bryan
1784/85	9th	Nicholas Van Dyke	No parties	Thomas McDonough	No parties	Thomas Duff
1785/86	10th	Nicholas Van Dyke	No parties	Thomas McDonough	No parties	Thomas Duff
1786/87	11th	Thomas Collins	No parties	George Craighead	No parties	John Cook
1787/88	12th	Thomas Collins	No parties	Thomas McDonough	No parties	Thomas Rodney
1788/89	13th	Thomas Collins; Jehu Davis; Joshua Clayton	No parties	George Mitchell	No parties	Jehu Davis
1789/90	14th	Joshua Clayton	No parties	George Mitchell	No parties	Jehu Davis
1790/91	15th	Joshua Clayton	No parties	George Mitchell	No parties	Henry Latimer
1791/92	16th	Joshua Clayton	No parties	George Mitchell	No parties	Allan McLane

== Constitution of 1792 ==
Under the Delaware Constitution of 1792 the General Assembly consisted of the Senate and the House of Representatives. There were nine members of the Senate, three from each county, and twenty-one members of the House of Representatives, seven from each county. All members were elected "at-large" from a multi-member district that included their entire county. Elections were held the first Tuesday of October and terms began on the first Tuesday in January, lasting three years for the Senate and one year for the House. Approximately one third of the Senate was elected every year. Sessions were generally held once every year.

Delaware General Assembly 1793–1832
Year	Assembly	Governor	Senate majority	Speaker	House majority	Speaker
1793	17th	Joshua Clayton	Federalist	Daniel Rogers	Federalist	George Wilson; Stephen Lewis
1794	18th	Joshua Clayton	Federalist	Daniel Rogers	Federalist	Stephen Lewis
1795	19th	Joshua Clayton	Federalist	Daniel Rogers	Federalist	Peter Lowber
1796	20th	Gunning Bedford Sr.	Federalist	Daniel Rogers	Federalist	Stephen Lewis
1797	21st	Gunning Bedford Sr. Daniel Rogers	Federalist	Daniel Rogers	Federalist	Stephen Lewis
1798	22nd	Daniel Rogers	Federalist	Isaac Davis	Federalist	Stephen Lewis
1799	23rd	Richard Bassett	Federalist	Isaac Davis	Federalist	Stephen Lewis
1800	24th	Richard Bassett	Federalist	James Sykes	Federalist	Stephen Lewis
1801	25th	Richard Bassett; James Sykes	Federalist	James Sykes	Federalist	Stephen Lewis
1802	26th	David Hall	Federalist	Daniel Rogers	Federalist	Stephen Lewis
1803	27th	David Hall	Federalist	James Sykes	Federalist	Stephen Lewis
1804	28th	David Hall	Federalist	James Sykes	Federalist	Jesse Green
1805	29th	Nathaniel Mitchell	Federalist	James Sykes	Federalist	Thomas Laws
1806	30th	Nathaniel Mitchell	Federalist	James Sykes	Federalist	Jesse Green
1807	31st	Nathaniel Mitchell	Federalist	James Sykes	Federalist	William Warner
1808	32nd	George Truitt	Federalist	James Sykes	Federalist	Stephen Lewis
1809	33rd	George Truitt	Federalist	James Sykes	Federalist	Stephen Lewis
1810	34th	George Truitt	Federalist	James Sykes	Federalist	Stephen Lewis
1811	35th	Joseph Haslet	Federalist	James Sykes	Federalist	Cornelius P. Comegys
1812	36th	Joseph Haslet	Federalist	James Sykes	Federalist	Cornelius P. Comegys
1813	37th	Joseph Haslet	Federalist	Andrew Barratt	Federalist	Cornelius P. Comegys
1814	38th	Daniel Rodney	Federalist	Andrew Barratt	Federalist	Cornelius P. Comegys
1815	39th	Daniel Rodney	Federalist	Jesse Green	Federalist	Cornelius P. Comegys
1816	40th	Daniel Rodney	Federalist	Jesse Green	Federalist	Nathan Vickers
1817	41st	John Clark	Federalist	Henry Molleston	Federalist	Nathan Vickers
1818	42nd	John Clark	Federalist	Henry Molleston	Federalist	Nathan Vickers
1819	43rd	John Clark	Federalist	Henry Molleston	Federalist	Nathan Vickers
1820	44th	Jacob Stout	Federalist	Jacob Stout	Federalist	Nathan Vickers
1821	45th	John Collins	Federalist	Caleb Rodney	Federalist	John Cummins
1822	46th	John Collins; Caleb Rodney	Federalist	Caleb Rodney	Federalist	Alrichs Ryland
1823	47th	Joseph Haslet; Charles Thomas	Democratic-Republican	Charles Thomas	Democratic-Republican	George Clark Jr.
1824	48th	Samuel Paynter	Federalist	Jesse Green	Federalist	Joshua Burton
1825	49th	Samuel Paynter	Federalist	Jesse Green	Federalist	Joshua Burton
1826	50th	Samuel Paynter	Federalist	Charles Polk Jr.	Federalist	Arnold Naudain
1827	51st	Charles Polk Jr.	Federalist	Henry Whiteley	Federalist	Archibald Hamilton
1828	52nd	Charles Polk Jr.	Federalist	Presley Spruance	Federalist	William W. Morris
1829	53rd	Charles Polk Jr.	Federalist	Presley Spruance	Federalist	William W. Morris; John Raymond
1830	54th	David Hazzard	National Republican	Presley Spruance	National Republican	Joshua Burton
1831	55th	David Hazzard	National Republican	Presley Spruance	National Republican	Joshua Burton
1832	56th	David Hazzard	National Republican	James P. Lofland	National Republican	Thomas Davis

== Constitution of 1831 ==
Under the Delaware Constitution of 1831 the General Assembly consisted of the Senate and the House of Representatives. There were nine members of the Senate, three from each county, and twenty-one members of the House of Representatives, seven from each county. All members were elected "at-large" from a multi-member district that included their entire county. Elections were held the first Tuesday after November 1 and terms began on the first Tuesday in January, lasting four years for the Senate and two years for the House. Approximately half of the Senate was elected every two years. Sessions were generally held once every two years, in the odd numbered year.

Delaware General Assembly 1832–1898
Year	Assembly	Governor	Senate majority	Speaker	House majority	Speaker
1833–1835	57th	Caleb Bennett	Whig	Joshua Burton	Whig	John Raymond
1835–1837	58th	Caleb Bennett; Charles Polk Jr.	Whig	Charles Polk Jr.	Whig	William D. Waples
1837–1839	59th	Cornelius P. Comegys	Whig	Presley Spruance	Whig	William D. Waples
1839–1841	60th	Cornelius P. Comegys	Democratic	Thomas Jacobs	Democratic	John P. Brinckloe
1841–1843	61st	William B. Cooper	Whig	Charles Polk Jr.	Whig	Robert Houston
1843–1845	62nd	William B. Cooper	Whig	Presley Spruance	Whig	William O. Redden
1845–1847	63rd	Thomas Stockton; Joseph Maull; William Temple	Whig	Joseph Maull	Whig	William Temple; William O. Redden
1847–1849	64th	William Tharp	Whig	William W. Morris	Whig	Lewis Thompson
1849–1851	65th	William Tharp	Whig	William W. Morris	Whig	Daniel Cummins
1851–1853	66th	William H. H. Ross	Democratic	John M. Phillips	Democratic	Samuel Jefferson
1853–1855	67th	William H. H. Ross	Democratic	John M. Phillips	Democratic	John R. McFee
1855–1857	68th	Peter F. Causey	Know-nothing	Daniel Curry	Know-nothing	Samuel Biddle
1857–1859	69th	Peter F. Causey	Democratic	Abraham Boyce	Democratic	George W. Cummins
1859–1861	70th	William Burton	Democratic	Manlove Carlisle	Democratic	John W. F. Jackson
1861–1863	71st	William Burton	Democratic	John Green	Republican	John F. Williamson
1863–1865	72nd	William Cannon	Democratic	John R. Tatum	Democratic	John Sorden
1865–1867	73rd	William Cannon; Gove Saulsbury	Democratic	Gove Saulsbury; William Hitch	Democratic	Shephard P. Houston
1867–1869	74th	Gove Saulsbury	Democratic	James Ponder	Democratic	William A. Polk
1869–1871	75th	Gove Saulsbury	Democratic	James W. Minors	Democratic	John Hickman
1871–1873	76th	James Ponder	Democratic	Charles Gooding	Democratic	Sewell C. Biggs
1873–1875	77th	James Ponder	Democratic	Allen V. Leslie	Democratic	Joseph Burchenal
1875–1877	78th	John P. Cochran	Democratic	Charles C. Stockley	Democratic	Thomas Holcomb
1877–1879	79th	John P. Cochran	Democratic	John T. Moore	Democratic	Hugh Martin
1879–1881	80th	John W. Hall	Democratic	Charles J. Harrington	Democratic	Swithin Chandler
1881–1883	81st	John W. Hall	Democratic	Cateby F. Rust	Democratic	Reynear Williams
1883–1885	82nd	Charles C. Stockley	Democratic	Samuel B. Cooper	Democratic	George H. Bates
1885–1887	83rd	Charles C. Stockley	Democratic	Alexander B. Cooper	Democratic	William A. Comegys
1887–1889	84th	Benjamin T. Biggs	Democratic	John E. Collins	Democratic	William R. McCabe
1889–1891	85th	Benjamin T. Biggs	Democratic	Beniah L. Lewis	Republican	John H. Hoffecker
1891–1893	86th	Robert J. Reynolds	Democratic	John P. Donohoe	Democratic	William L. Sirman
1893–1895	87th	Robert J. Reynolds	Democratic	Charles B. Houston	Democratic	J. Harvey Whiteman
1895–1897	88th	Joshua H. Marvil; William T. Watson	Democratic	William T. Watson	Republican	Henry H. McMullen
1897–1899	89th	Ebe W. Tunnell	Democratic	Hezekiah Harrington	Democratic	Emory B. Riggin

== Constitution of 1897 ==
Under the original Delaware Constitution of 1897 the General Assembly consisted of the Senate and the House of Representatives. Elections were held the first Tuesday after November 1 and terms begin on the second Tuesday in January, lasting four years for the Senate and two years for the House. Approximately half of the Senate was elected every two years. Sessions were generally held once every year, lasting no longer than June 30.

Prior to 1965, there were seventeen members of the Senate, seven from New Castle County and five each from Kent and Sussex County. There were thirty-five members of the House of Representatives, fifteen from New Castle County and ten each from Kent and Sussex County. All members were elected from single member districts.

Delaware General Assembly 1899–1964
Year	Assembly	Governor	Lt. Governor	Senate majority	President pro tempore	House majority	Speaker
1899–1900	90th	Ebe W. Tunnell	None	Democratic	Charles M. Salmon	Republican	Theodore F. Clark
1901–1902	91st	John Hunn	Philip L. Cannon	Republican	Henry C. Ellison	Republican	James V. McCommons
1903–1904	92nd	John Hunn	Philip L. Cannon	Republican	Henry C. Ellison	Republican	Henry S. Anthony
1905–1906	93rd	Preston Lea	Isaac T. Parker	Republican	Alvin B. Conner	Republican	William D. Denney
1907–1908	94th	Preston Lea	Isaac T. Parker	Republican	George W. Sparks	Republican	Richard Hodgson
1909–1910	95th	Simeon S. Pennewill	John M. Mendinhall	Republican	George W. Sparks	Democratic	Thomas O. Cooper
1911–1912	96th	Simeon S. Pennewill	John M. Mendinhall	Democratic	Thomas M. Monaghan	Republican	Denward W. Campbell
1913–1914	97th	Charles R. Miller	Colen Ferguson	Republican	George W. Marshall	Republican	Chauncey P. Holcomb
1915–1916	98th	Charles R. Miller	Colen Ferguson	Republican	John M. Walker	Republican	Charles H. Grantland
1917–1918	99th	John G. Townsend Jr.	Lewis T. Eliason	Republican	John A. Barnard	Democratic	Hervey P. Hall
1919–1920	100th	John G. Townsend Jr.	Lewis T. Eliason	Republican	Isaac D. Short	Republican	Alexander P. Corbit
1921–1922	101st	William D. Denney	J. Danforth Bush	Republican	Wallace S. Handy	Democratic	Walter J. Paskey Sr.
1923–1924	102nd	William D. Denney	J. Danforth Bush	Democratic	Charles D. Murphy	Democratic	Samuel N. Culver
1925–1926	103rd	Robert P. Robinson	James H. Anderson	Democratic	William C. Truitt	Republican	Henry C. Downward
1927–1928	104th	Robert P. Robinson	James H. Anderson	Democratic	William F. Allen	Republican	William Wintrup
1929–1930	105th	C. Douglass Buck	James H. Hazel	Republican	William A. Simonton	Republican	Charles W. Messick
1931–1932	106th	C. Douglass Buck	James H. Hazel	Republican	William A. Simonton	Republican	Bud Coy
1933–1934	107th	C. Douglass Buck	Roy F. Corley	Republican	William A. Simonton	Democratic	Julian T. Robinson
1935–1936	108th	C. Douglass Buck	Roy F. Corley	Republican	Levi G. Maloney	Republican	Harry V. Lyons
1937–1938	109th	Richard C. McMullen	Edward W. Cooch	Republican	William A. Simonton	Democratic	John R. Fader
1939–1940	110th	Richard C. McMullen	Edward W. Cooch	Republican	David W. Steele	Republican	Frank R. Zebley
1941–1942	111th	Walter W. Bacon	Isaac J. MacCollum	Republican	Harold W. T. Purnell	Republican	George W. Rhodes
1943–1944	112th	Walter W. Bacon	Isaac J. MacCollum	Republican	Clayton A. Bunting	Republican	Benjamin F. Johnson
1945–1946	113th	Walter W. Bacon	Elbert N. Carvel	Republican	Harry H. Mulholland	Republican	Chester V. Townsend Jr.
1947–1948	114th	Walter W. Bacon	Elbert N. Carvel	Republican	George W. Rhodes	Republican	William T. Chipman
1949–1950	115th	Elbert N. Carvel	Alexis I. du Pont Bayard	Democratic	Vera G. Davis	Republican	Harvey H. Lawson
1951–1952	116th	Elbert N. Carvel	Alexis I. du Pont Bayard	Democratic	Roy A. Cannon	Republican	Harvey H. Lawson
1953–1954	117th	J. Caleb Boggs	John W. Rollins	Republican	Thomas L. Johnson	Republican	Frank A. Jones
1955–1956	118th	J. Caleb Boggs	John W. Rollins	Democratic	Charles G. Moore	Democratic	James R. Quigley
1957–1958	119th	J. Caleb Boggs	David P. Buckson	Democratic	Lemuel Hickman	Democratic	Harry E. Mayhew
1959–1960	120th	J. Caleb Boggs	David P. Buckson	Democratic	Allen J. Cook	Democratic	Sherman W. Tribbitt
1961–1962	121st	Elbert N. Carvel	Eugene Lammot	Democratic	John B. Reilly	Democratic	Sherman W. Tribbitt
1963–1964	122nd	Elbert N. Carvel	Eugene Lammot	Democratic	Curtis W. Steen	Democratic	Sherman W. Tribbitt

== Amended Constitution of 1897 ==
Under the amended Delaware Constitution of 1897 the General Assembly consists of the Senate and the House of Representatives. Elections are held the first Tuesday after November 1 and terms begin on the second Tuesday in January, lasting four years for the Senate and two years for the House. Approximately half of the Senate is elected every two years. Sessions are generally held once every year, lasting no longer than June 30.

Since 1965 the membership of the Senate has increased to twenty-one members and the House to forty-one members. All members are elected from single member districts, with roughly equal population, reapportioned at each census. While district boundaries no longer necessarily follow county boundaries, in the Senate there are presently fourteen districts mostly in New Castle County, three mostly in Kent County, and four mostly in Sussex County. In the House there are presently twenty-six districts mostly in New Castle County, seven mostly in Kent County, and eight mostly in Sussex County.

Delaware General Assembly 1965–present
Year	Assembly	Governor	Lt. Governor	Senate majority	President pro tempore	House majority	Speaker
1965–1966	123rd	Charles L. Terry Jr.	Sherman W. Tribbitt	Democratic	Curtis W. Steen	Democratic	Harold T. Bockman
1967–1968	124th	Charles L. Terry Jr.	Sherman W. Tribbitt	Democratic	Calvin R. McCullough	Republican	George C. Hering III
1969–1970	125th	Russell W. Peterson	Eugene Bookhammer	Republican	Reynolds du Pont	Republican	George C. Hering III
1971–1972	126th	Russell W. Peterson	Eugene Bookhammer	Republican	Reynolds du Pont	Republican	William L. Frederick
1973–1974	127th	Sherman W. Tribbitt	Eugene Bookhammer	Democratic	J. Donald Isaacs	Republican	John F. Kirk Jr.
1975–1976	128th	Sherman W. Tribbitt	Eugene Bookhammer	Democratic	J. Donald Isaacs	Democratic	Casimir S. Jonkiert
1977–1978	129th	Pete du Pont	James D. McGinnis	Democratic	Richard S. Cordrey	Democratic	Kenneth W. Boulden; John P. Ferguson
1979–1980	130th	Pete du Pont	James D. McGinnis	Democratic	Richard S. Cordrey	Republican	Robert W. Riddagh
1981–1982	131st	Pete du Pont	Mike Castle	Democratic	Richard S. Cordrey	Republican	Charles L. Hebner
1983–1984	132nd	Pete du Pont	Mike Castle	Democratic	Richard S. Cordrey	Democratic	Orlando J. George Jr.
1985–1986	133rd	Mike Castle	Shien Biau Woo	Democratic	Richard S. Cordrey	Republican	Charles L. Hebner
1987–1988	134th	Mike Castle	Shien Biau Woo	Democratic	Richard S. Cordrey	Republican	B. Bradford Barnes; Terry R. Spence
1989–1990	135th	Mike Castle	Dale E. Wolf	Democratic	Richard S. Cordrey	Republican	Terry R. Spence
1991–1992	136th	Mike Castle	Dale E. Wolf	Democratic	Richard S. Cordrey	Republican	Terry R. Spence
1993–1994	137th	Tom Carper	Ruth Ann Minner	Democratic	Richard S. Cordrey	Republican	Terry R. Spence
1995–1996	138th	Tom Carper	Ruth Ann Minner	Democratic	Richard S. Cordrey	Republican	Terry R. Spence
1997–1998	139th	Tom Carper	Ruth Ann Minner	Democratic	Thomas B. Sharp	Republican	Terry R. Spence
1999–2000	140th	Tom Carper	Ruth Ann Minner	Democratic	Thomas B. Sharp	Republican	Terry R. Spence
2001–2002	141st	Ruth Ann Minner	John Carney	Democratic	Thomas B. Sharp	Republican	Terry R. Spence
2003–2004	142nd	Ruth Ann Minner	John Carney	Democratic	Thurman Adams Jr.	Republican	Terry R. Spence
2005–2006	143rd	Ruth Ann Minner	John Carney	Democratic	Thurman Adams Jr.	Republican	Terry R. Spence
2007–2008	144th	Ruth Ann Minner	John Carney	Democratic	Thurman Adams Jr.	Republican	Terry R. Spence
2009–2010	145th	Jack Markell	Matthew P. Denn	Democratic	Anthony J. DeLuca	Democratic	Robert F. Gilligan
2011–2012	146th	Jack Markell	Matthew P. Denn	Democratic	Anthony J. DeLuca	Democratic	Robert F. Gilligan
2013–2014	147th	Jack Markell	Matthew P. Denn	Democratic	Patricia M. Blevins	Democratic	Peter C. Schwartzkopf
2015–2016	148th	Jack Markell	Vacant	Democratic	Patricia M. Blevins	Democratic	Peter C. Schwartzkopf
2017–2018	149th	John Carney	Bethany Hall-Long	Democratic	David McBride	Democratic	Peter C. Schwartzkopf
2019–2020	150th	John Carney	Bethany Hall-Long	Democratic	David McBride	Democratic	Peter C. Schwartzkopf
2021–2022	151st	John Carney	Bethany Hall-Long	Democratic	David Sokola	Democratic	Peter C. Schwartzkopf
2023–2024	152nd	John Carney	Bethany Hall-Long	Democratic	David Sokola	Democratic	Peter C. Schwartzkopf

== See also ==
- Historical outline of Delaware
- Lists of United States state legislative sessions

== Places with more information ==
- Delaware Historical Society; website; 505 Market St, Wilmington, Delaware; (302) 655-7161.
- University of Delaware; Library website; 181 South College Ave, Newark, Delaware; (302) 831–2965.
