= 128th Delaware General Assembly =

American legislative session

←	127th	129th	→

Overview
- Legislative body: Delaware General Assembly
- Term: January 7, 1975 – January 4, 1977

The 128th Delaware General Assembly was a meeting of the legislative branch of the state government, consisting of the Delaware Senate and the Delaware House of Representatives. Elections were held the first Tuesday after November 1 and terms began in Dover on the first Tuesday in January. This date was January 7, 1975, which was two weeks before the beginning of the third administrative year of Governor Sherman W. Tribbitt and Eugene Bookhammer as Lieutenant Governor.

Currently the distribution of seats for both houses was based on the interpretation of the federal 1970 census. It resulted in a large numbers of membership numbers in the New Castle County area and ruling that the election districts would abandonment of county lines for their boundaries, but would design whatever district boundaries that would accomplish such population equals.

In the 128th Delaware General Assembly session both chambers had a Democratic majority.

== Leadership ==
=== Senate ===
- J. Donald Isaacs, New Castle County, Democratic

=== House of Representatives ===
- Casimir S. Jonkiert, New Castle County, Democratic

== Members ==
=== Senate ===
About half the State Senators were elected every two years for a four-year term, except the decade district redesign year, when all served two years. They were designed for equal populations from all districts and its accomplishment occasionally included some territory from two counties.

New Castle County

- 1. Mike Castle
- 2. Herman Holloway
- 3. George F. Schlor
- 4. Robert J. Berndt
- 5. Charles E. Hughes
- 6. Dean C. Steele
- 7. Andrew G. Knox
- 8. Margaret R. Manning

New Castle County

- 9. Thomas B. Sharp
- 10. Everette Hale
- 11. Anthony J. Cicione
- 12. Calvin R. McCullough
- 13. Francis J. Kearns
- 14. Roger A. Martin
- 15. J. Donald Isaacs

Kent County

- 16. Nancy W. Cook
- 17. Jacob W. Zimmerman
- 18. William M. Murphy Jr.

Sussex County

- 19. Thurman G. Adams Jr.
- 20. Richard S. Cordrey
- 21. David H. Elliott

=== House of Representatives ===
All the State Representatives were elected every two years for a two-year term. They were designed for equal populations from all districts and its accomplishment occasionally included some territory from two counties.

New Castle County

- 1. Orlando J. George Jr.
- 2. Al O. Plant Sr.
- 3. Henrietta R. Johnson
- 4. Marcello Rispoli
- 5. Casimir S. Jonklert
- 6. Francis M. Jornlin
  - Thomas E. Brady Jr.
- 7. Joseph P. Ambrosino Jr.
- 8. Lois M. Lesher
- 9. Charles L. Hebner
- 10. Gwynne P. Smith
- 11. Richard Sincock
- 12. C. Leslie Ridings
- 13. John P. McKay
- 14. Robert Maxwell

New Castle County

- 15. Robert Byrd
- 16. Daniel J. Kelly
- 17. John Matushefske
- 18. Kenneth W. Boulden Sr.
- 19. Robert T. Connor
- 20. John P. Ferguson
- 21. Robert F. Gilligan
- 22. John H. Arnold
- 23. Robert S. Powell
- 24. Richard Legates
- 25. John G. S. Billingsley
- 26. Marion I. Seibel
- 27. Sandra L. Worthen
- 28. Gerald S. Cain
- 29. Winifred Spence

Kent County

- 30. Robert W. Riddagh
- 31. Karen Miller
- 32. James D. McGinnis
- 33. Ruth Ann Minner
- 34. John E. Morris
- 35. Robert L. Darlling

Sussex County

- 36. Lewis B. Harrington
- 37. Harry E. Derrickson
- 38. Howard A. Clendaniel
- 39. Thomas A. Temple Sr.
- 40. William J. Gordy
- 41. Donald J. Lynch

== Places with more information ==
- Delaware Historical Society; website; 505 North Market Street, Wilmington, Delaware 19801; (302) 655-7161.
- University of Delaware; Library website; 181 South College Avenue, Newark, Delaware 19717; (302) 831-2965.
