= 126th Delaware General Assembly =

American legislative session

| ← | 125th | 127th | → |

Overview
- Legislative body: Delaware General Assembly
- Term: January 5, 1971 – January 2, 1973

The 126th Delaware General Assembly was a meeting of the legislative branch of the state government, consisting of the Delaware Senate and the Delaware House of Representatives. Elections were held the first Tuesday after November 1 and terms began in Dover on the first Tuesday in January. This date was January 5, 1971, which was two weeks before the beginning of the third administrative year of Governor Russell W. Peterson and Eugene Bookhammer as Lieutenant Governor.

Currently the distribution of seats for both houses was based on a court interpreted interpretation of the federal 1960 census. It resulted in a large shift in membership numbers to the New Castle County area and ruling that the election districts would abandonment of county lines for their boundaries, but could design whatever district boundaries that would accomplish such population equals. Subsequent census were adjusted such boundaries to continue such adjectives, the next being in 1972.

In the 126th Delaware General Assembly session both chambers had a Republican majority.

== Leadership ==
=== Senate ===
- Reynolds du Pont, New Castle County, Republican

=== House of Representatives ===
- William L. Frederick, New Castle County, Republican

== Members ==
=== Senate ===
About half the State Senators were elected every two years for a four-year term, except the decade district redesign year, when all served two years. They were designed for equal populations from all districts and its accomplishment occasionally included some territory from two counties.

New Castle County

- 1. Mike Castle
- 2. Herman Holloway
- 3. George F. Schlor
- 4. Dean C. Steele
- 5. Louise Conner
- 6. Reynolds du Pont
- 7. Margaret R. Manning

New Castle County

- 8. Anthony J. Cicione
- 9. William F. Hart
- 10. Melvin A. Slawik
- 11. Calvin R. McCullough
- 12. Everette Hale
- 13. J. Donald Isaacs

Kent County

- 14. Allen J. Cook
- 15. Andrew Foltz
- 16. George A. Robbins

Sussex County

- 17. Frank R. Grier
- 18. Thomas E. Hickman Jr.
- 19. David H. Elliott

=== House of Representatives ===
All the State Representatives were elected every two years for a two-year term. They were designed for equal populations from all districts and its accomplishment occasionally included some territory from two counties.

New Castle County

- 1. Kermit H. Justice
- 2. Clifford B. Hearn Jr.
- 3. Henrietta R. Johnson
- 4. Charles S. Miller
- 5. Casimir S. Jonklert
- 6. George C. Hering III
- 7. Robert J. Berndt
- 8. Herbert A. Lesher
- 9. Clarice U. Heckert
- 10. Daniel E. Weiss
- 11. Thomas L. Little
- 12. William T. Poulterer III
- 13. Andrew G. Knox
- 14. Joan C. Wright

New Castle County

- 15. William L. Frederick
- 16. Michael F. Harkins
- 17. Philip W. Orth
- 18. John A. Dillman Jr.
- 19. John Matushefske
- 20. Kenneth W. Boulden Sr.
- 21. Robert T. Connor
- 22. John F. Kirk Jr.
- 23. George Jarvis
- 24. Joseph R. Murphy Jr.
- 25. John G. S. Billingsley
- 26. Marion I. Seibel
- 27. Sherman W. Tribbitt

Kent County

- 28. Robert W. Riddagh
- 29. Arthur W. Dobberstein
- 30. Hudson E. Gruwell
- 31. W. Neal Moerschel
- 32. Ralph R. Smith
- 33. G. Robert Quillen

Sussex County

- 34. Lewis B. Harrington
- 35. Howard A. Clendaniel
- 36. R. Glen Mears Sr.
- 37. William J. Gordy
- 38. Richard S. Cordrey
- 39. Harry E. Derrickson

== Places with more information ==
- Delaware Historical Society; website; 505 North Market Street, Wilmington, Delaware 19801; (302) 655-7161.
- University of Delaware; Library website; 181 South College Avenue, Newark, Delaware 19717; (302) 831-2965.
