= 136th Delaware General Assembly =

American legislative session

| ← | 135th | 137th | → |

Overview
- Legislative body: Delaware General Assembly
- Term: January 8, 1991 – January 5, 1993

The 136th Delaware General Assembly was a meeting of the legislative branch of the state government, consisting of the Delaware Senate and the Delaware House of Representatives. Elections were held the first Tuesday after November 1 and terms began in Dover on the first Tuesday in January. This date was January 8, 1991, which was two weeks before the beginning of the seventh administrative year of Republican Governor Mike Castle from New Castle County and the third year for Republican Lieutenant Governor Dale E. Wolf, also from New Castle County.

Currently the distribution of seats for both houses was based on the interpretation of the federal 1980 census. It resulted in a large numbers of membership numbers in the New Castle County area and ruling that the election districts would abandonment of county lines for their boundaries, but would design whatever district boundaries that would accomplish such population equals.

In the 136th Delaware General Assembly session the Senate had a Democratic majority and the House had a Republican majority.

== Leadership ==
Senate

- Richard S. Cordrey, Sussex County, Democratic

House of Representatives

- Terry R. Spence, New Castle County, Republican

== Members ==
=== Senate ===
About half the State Senators were elected every two years for a four-year term, except the decade district redesign year, when all served two years. They were designed for equal populations from all districts and its accomplishment occasionally included some territory from two counties.

New Castle County

- 1. Harris McDowell III
- 2. Herman M. Holloway Sr.
- 3. Robert I. Marshall
- 4. Richard A. Hauge
- 5. Myrna L. Bair
- 6. Andrew G. Knox
- 7. Patricia M. Blevins

New Castle County

- 8. David P. Sokola
- 9. Thomas B. Sharp
- 10. James P. Neal
- 11. Roger A. Martin
- 12. Robert T. Connor
- 13. David B. McBride
- 14. James T. Vaughn

Kent County

- 15. Nancy W. Cook
- 16. William C. Torbert
- 17. John C. Still III
- 18. Ruth Ann Minner

Sussex County

- 19. Thurman G. Adams Jr.
- 20. Richard S. Cordrey
- 21. Robert L. Venables Sr.

=== House of Representatives ===
All the State Representatives were elected every two years for a two-year term. They were designed for equal populations from all districts and its accomplishment occasionally included some territory from two counties.

New Castle County

- 1. Orlando J. George Jr.
- 2. Rourke A. Moore
- 3. James H. Sills Jr.
- 4. Joseph G. DiPinto
- 5. Casimir S. Jonkiert
- 6. David H. Ennis
- 7. Wayne A. Smith
- 8. David D. Brady
- 9. Charles L. Hebner Sr.
- 10. Jane P. Maroney
- 11. Marybeth T. Boykin
- 12. Philip J. Corrozi
- 13. John F. Van Sant III
- 14. John A. Campanelli

New Castle County

- 15. Bruce C. Reynolds
- 16. William I. Houghton
- 17. Jeffrey G. Mack
- 18. Terry R. Spence
- 19. Robert F. Gilligan
- 20. Roger P. Roy
- 21. Steven C. Taylor
- 22. Joseph R. Petrilli
- 23. Ada Leigh Soles
- 24. William A. Oberle Jr.
- 25. Steven H. Amick
- 26. Richard F. Davis
- 27. Vincent A. Lofink

Kent County

- 28: Bruce C. Ennis
- 29. Donald M. Clark
- 30. C. Robert Quillen
- 31. E. Stuart Outten Jr.
- 32. Edward J. Bennett
- 33. G. Wallace Caulk Jr.
- 34. Gerald A. Buckworth

Sussex County

- 35. J. Benjamin Ewing
- 36. V. George Carey
- 37. John R. Schroeder
- 38. George H. Bunting Jr.
- 39. Evelyn K. Fallon
- 40. Clifford F. Lee
  - Clifford G. Lee
- 41. Charles P. West

== Places with more information ==
- Delaware Historical Society; website; 505 North Market Street, Wilmington, Delaware 19801; (302) 655-7161.
- University of Delaware; Library website; 181 South College Avenue, Newark, Delaware 19717; (302) 831-2965.
