= 142nd Delaware General Assembly =

American legislative session

←	141st	143rd	→

Overview
- Legislative body: Delaware General Assembly
- Term: January 7, 2003 – January 4, 2005

The 142nd Delaware General Assembly was a meeting of the legislative branch of the state government, consisting of the Delaware Senate and the Delaware House of Representatives. Elections were held the first Tuesday after November 1 and terms began in Dover on the first Tuesday in January. This date was January 7, 2003, which was two weeks before the beginning of the third administrative year of Democratic Governor Ruth Ann Minner from Kent County and Democratic Lieutenant Governor John Carney from New Castle County.

Currently the distribution of seats for both houses was based on the first time the interpretation of the federal 2000 census. Therefore, it resulted in new district boundaries and elections for all the districts. It was ruled that the election districts would abandon county lines for their boundaries, but would design whatever district boundaries that would accomplish such population equals.

In the 142nd Delaware General Assembly session the Senate had a Democratic majority and the House had a Republican majority.

== Party summary ==
Senate

- Democratic (D): 13 (majority)
- Republican (R): 8

Total members: 21

House of Representatives

- Democratic (D): 12
- Republican (R): 29 (majority)

Total members: 41

== Leadership ==
Senate

- Lieutenant Governor (President of the Senate):
  - John Carney, Democratic of New Castle County.
- President pro tempore of the Senate:
  - Thurman G. Adams, Democratic of Sussex County.

House of Representatives

- Speaker of the House
  - Terry R. Spence, Republican of New Castle County.

== Members ==
=== Senate ===
About half the State Senators were elected every two years for a four-year term, except the decade district redesign year, when all served two years. They were designed for equal populations from all districts and its accomplishment occasionally included some territory from two counties.

New Castle County

- 1. Harris McDowell III (D)
- 2. Margaret R. Henry (D)
- 3. Robert I. Marshall (D)
- 4. Charles L. Copeland (R)
- 5. Catherine L. Cloutier (R)
- 6. Liane M. Sorenson (R)
- 7. Patricia M. Blevins (D)

New Castle County

- 8. David P. Sokola (D)
- 9. Karen E. Peterson (D)
- 10. Steven H. Amick (R)
- 11. Anthony J. DeLuca (D)
- 12. Dorinda A. Connor (R)
- 13. David B. McBride (D)
- 14. James T. Vaughn (D)

Kent County

- 15. Nancy W. Cook (D)
- 16. Colin R. J. Bonini (R)
- 17. John C. Still III (R)
- 18. F. Gary Simpson (R)

Sussex County

- 19. Thurman G. Adams Jr. (D)
- 20. George H. Bunting Jr. (D)
- 21. Robert L. Venables Sr. (D)

=== House of Representatives ===
All the State Representatives were elected every two years for a two-year term. They were designed for equal populations from all districts and its accomplishment occasionally included some territory from two counties.

New Castle County

- 1. Dennis P. Williams (D)
- 2. Hazel D. Plant (D)
- 3. Helene M. Keeley (D)
- 4. Joseph G. DiPinto (R)
- 5. Melanie L. George (D)
- 6. David H. Ennis (R)
- 7. Wayne A. Smith (R)
- 8. Bethany A. Hall-Long (D)
- 9. Richard C. Cathcart (R)
- 10. Robert J. Valihura Jr. (R)
- 11. Gregory F. Lavelle (R)
- 12. Deborah D. Hudson (R)
- 13. John F. Van Sant III (D)
- 14. Peter C. Schwartzkopf (D)

New Castle County

- 15. Bruce C. Reynolds (R)
- 16. William I. Houghton (D)
- 17. Michael P. Mulrooney (D)
- 18. Terry R. Spence (R)
- 19. Robert F. Gilligan (D)
- 20. Roger P. Roy (R)
- 21. Pamela S. Maier (R)
- 22. Joseph E. Miro (R)
- 23. Timothy U. Boulden (R)
- 24. William A. Oberle Jr. (R)
- 25. Stephanie A. Ulbrich (R)
- 26. John Viola (D)
- 27. Vincent A. Lofink (R)

Kent County

- 28: Bruce C. Ennis (D)
- 29. Pamela J. Thornburg (R)
- 30. C. Robert Quillen (R)
- 31. Nancy Wagner (R)
- 32. Donna D. Stone (R)
- 33. G. Wallace Caulk Jr. (R)
- 34. Gerald A. Buckworth (R)

Sussex County

- 35. J. Benjamin Ewing (R)
- 36. V. George Carey (R)
- 37. Joseph W. Booth (R)
- 38. Gerald W. Hocker (R)
- 39. Evelyn K. Fallon (R)
- 40. Clifford G. Lee (R)
- 41. John C. Atkins (R)

== Places with more information ==
- Delaware Historical Society; website; 505 North Market Street, Wilmington, Delaware 19801; (302) 655–7161.
- University of Delaware; Library website; 181 South College Avenue, Newark, Delaware 19717; (302) 831–2965.
