= George C. Hering III =

American politician (1930–2024)

Doug Scamman

Speaker of the Delaware House of Representatives
- In office 1967–1972
- Preceded by: Harold T. Bockman
- Succeeded by: William L. Frederick

Member of the Delaware House of Representatives for New Castle County
- In office 1967–1972

Personal details
- Born: George Clark Hering III; 1930 Wilmington, Delaware, U.S.
- Died: December 14, 2024 (aged 94)
- Party: Republican
- Education: Dickinson College

George Clark Hering III (1930 – December 14, 2024) was an American politician and lawyer in the state of Delaware.

== Life and career ==
Hering was born in Wilmington in 1930 and earned a law degree at the Dickinson School of Law in 1959 after completing his bachelor's degree in 1953. He was admitted to the bar in 1959. Hering was first elected to the Delaware House of Representatives in 1966 and served as Speaker of the House from 1967 to 1970. He continued to serve as a state representative until 1972, then returned to his law practice in Wilmington.

Hering died on December 14, 2024, at the age of 94.
