= John F. Kirk Jr. =

American politician (1931–2025)

Speaker of the Delaware House of Representatives
- In office 1973–1974
- Preceded by: William L. Frederick
- Succeeded by: Casimir S. Jonkiert

Member of the Delaware House of Representatives for New Castle County
- In office 1969–1974

Personal details
- Born: John Francis Kirk Jr. June 15, 1931 Wilmington, Delaware, U.S.
- Died: October 30, 2025 (aged 94) Venice, Florida, U.S.
- Party: Republican
- Spouse: Margaret Nickle (m. 1953)
- Education: Goldey-Beacom College

John Francis Kirk Jr. (June 15, 1931 – October 30, 2025) was an American politician in the state of Delaware.

== Life and career ==
Kirk was born in Wilmington, Delaware on June 15, 1931, and attended Goldey-Beacom College. He served in Europe with the United States Army, reaching the rank of corporal. He married Margaret Nickle in 1953.

He resided in Delaware City, Delaware where he had a hardware store. Active in local politics, Kirk was a member of the New Castle County Republican committee as well as his local school board, serving as president from 1966 to 1968. He was elected to the Delaware House of Representatives in 1968 and served until 1974, including a term as Speaker of the House in his final term, from 1973 to 1974. In July 1974, he announced his retirement from politics deciding not to run for a fourth term in the House, opting to return to his business in Delaware City.

Kirk died in Venice, Florida on October 30, 2025, at the age of 94.
