= Robert Gilligan =

American politician

Speaker of the Delaware House of Representatives
- In office January 13, 2009 – January 8, 2013
- Preceded by: Terry R. Spence
- Succeeded by: Peter Schwartzkopf

Member of the Delaware House of Representatives from the 19th district
- In office January 9, 1973 – January 8, 2013
- Succeeded by: Kimberly Williams

Personal details
- Party: Democratic
- Education: Saint Joseph's College (BS); Villanova University (MA)

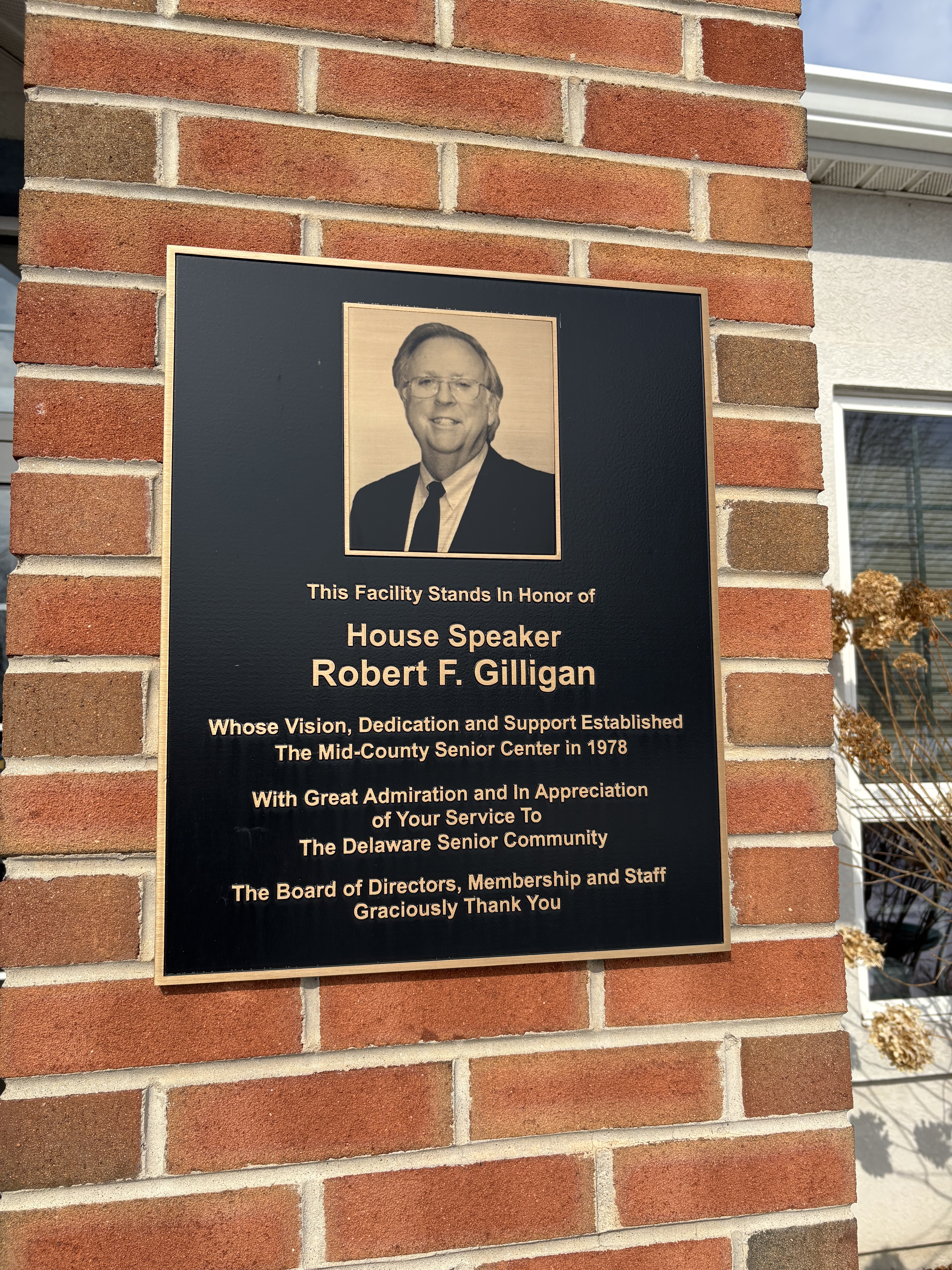
Plaque honoring Robert F. Gilligan outside the Mid-County Senior Center in Wilmington, Delaware.

Robert Gilligan is an American politician. He was a Democratic member of the Delaware House of Representatives for over 40 years, where he also served as Speaker of the House. Elected to the House in 1972, he was the longest-serving member of the legislature at the time of his retirement in 2013. He became Speaker in 2009 after Democrats took control of the House for the first time in 24 years. He had previously served as the majority leader from 1983 to 1985, minority whip from 1985 to 1995, and minority leader from 1995 to 2009.

Gilligan obtained a BS in political science from Saint Joseph's College and a MA in education from Villanova University.

Delaware House of Representatives
Preceded by Terry R. Spence	Speaker of the House; 2009–2013	Succeeded by Peter Schwartzkopf
