= Nancy Wagner =

American politician

Member of Delaware House of Representatives for the 31st district
- In office January 5, 1993 – 2010
- Succeeded by: Darryl M. Scott

Personal details
- Party: Republican

Nancy H. Wagner is an American politician from the Republican Party of Delaware.

== Career ==
Wagner was defeated by Democrat Darryl Scott in 2008. She later ran for Mayor of Dover.

== See also ==
- 137th Delaware General Assembly
- 138th Delaware General Assembly
- 139th Delaware General Assembly
- 140th Delaware General Assembly
- 141st Delaware General Assembly
- 142nd Delaware General Assembly
- 143rd Delaware General Assembly
