= Columbus Watkins =

American politician

Member of the Delaware House of Representatives from the 5th New Castle County district
- In office January 6, 1891 – January 3, 1893
- Preceded by: Thomas B. Smith
- Succeeded by: George W. Reynold

Personal details
- Born: September 17, 1829 St. George's Hundred, Delaware
- Died: February 7, 1905 (aged 75) Odessa, Delaware
- Party: Democratic
- Profession: Businessman, politician

Columbus Watkins (September 17, 1829 – February 7, 1905) was an American businessman and politician. He operated several businesses in Odessa, Delaware, and served one term in the Delaware House of Representatives during the 87th Delaware General Assembly. He was a Democrat.

== Biography ==
Watkins was born on a farm in St. George's Hundred, Delaware, on September 17, 1829, to Gassaway and Hester Watkins. He was of Welsh descent, and his family were among the early settlers of Maryland. His mother was described by biographer J. M. Runk as "a lady of superior intellect and attainments, who not only superintended the education of her children, but herself imparted to them instruction in the higher branches." Thus, Watkins became, through the efforts of his mother, a "well educated man." As a child, he also worked as an assistant in his father's store.

When 16 years old, Watkins was hired as a clerk at the mercantile business Polk & Beaston, located in Odessa. Joining the establishment in April 1846, he purchased the share of Polk in 1850, and it was renamed Beaston & Watkins: General Merchants and Grain Dealers. The business continued under this name until 1865, when Watkins purchased Beaston's share and it ran under just Watkins' name. In 1880, he sold the business to his son, Frank B. Watkins.

For years, Watkins owned several ships along with Beaston, which sent grain, coal lumber, staves, and other materials to Philadelphia, returning with cargoes of merchandise. Their trade in grain was considered especially large, even for Odessa, which was at the time one of the principal grain shipping ports in the Mid-Atlantic.

In 1880, Watkins partnered with his sons and entered the canning business, founding the Watkins Packing Company. The business canned tomatoes, corn, and "all types of fruit." It was described by The Odessa Herald as one of "the great industries of our town, and its influences, financial and otherwise, are felt on every side."

Watkins also helped found the Odessa National Bank, and served as a stockholder and was its director for more than 20 years. He was the first to introduce regular communication by steam between Odessa and Philadelphia and had the ship Clio built in 1878, which carried passengers and freight across the area. He also was a promoter and stockholder of the Odessa Creamery Company.

J. M. Runk described Watkins as "a keen and progressive businessman," who "has been identified with all schemes for the improvement of the town and hundred." A Democrat in politics, he was a supporter of sound money and was greatly opposed to free silver. In 1891, Watkins was elected to serve in the 87th Delaware General Assembly as a member of the House of Representatives. In his one term in office, Watkins served "faithfully and well," according to Runk, acting on several important committees.

Watkins was married to Frances B. Watkins on May 29, 1855, with whom he had four children. He was a member of the Presbyterian Church. He died on February 7, 1905, at the age of 75.
