= Darryl M. Scott =

American politician

Member of the Delaware House of Representatives from the 31st district
- In office November 5, 2008 – November 8, 2014
- Preceded by: Nancy Wagner
- Succeeded by: Sean Lynn

Personal details
- Born: February 24, 1964 (age 62)
- Party: Democratic
- Education: Eastern Kentucky University

Darryl Mason Scott (born February 24, 1964) is an American politician. He was a Democratic member of the Delaware House of Representatives from 2009 to 2015, representing District 31. Scott earned a BS from Eastern Kentucky University.

== Electoral history ==
- In 2008, Scott won the general election with 4,372 votes (52.6%) against incumbent Republican Nancy Wagner, who had held the seat since 2001.
- In 2010, Scott won the general election with 3,487 votes (59.1%) against Republican nominee Ronald Smith.
- In 2012, Scott won the general election with 5,231 votes (62.6%) against Republican nominee Samuel Chick.
