= 15th Delaware General Assembly =

American legislative session

←	14th	16th	→

Overview
- Legislative body: Delaware General Assembly
- Term: October 20, 1790 – October 20, 1791

The 15th Delaware General Assembly was a meeting of the legislative branch of the state government, consisting of the Delaware Legislative Council and the Delaware House of Assembly. Elections were held the first day of October and terms began on the twentieth day of October. It met in Dover, Delaware, convening October 20, 1790, and was the second year of the administration of President Joshua Clayton.

The apportionment of seats was permanently assigned to three councilors and seven assemblymen for each of the three counties. Population of the county did not effect the number of delegates.

== Leadership ==
=== Legislative Council ===
- George Mitchell, Sussex County

=== House of Assembly ===
- Henry Latimer, New Castle County

== Members ==
=== Legislative Council ===
Councilors were elected by the public for a three-year term, one third posted each year.

New Castle County

- Gunning Bedford Sr.
- Thomas Kean
- Alexander Porter Jr.

Kent County

- John Banning
- John Gordon
- Nicholas Ridgely

Sussex County

- Isaac Cooper
- George Mitchell
- Rhodes Shankland

=== House of Assembly ===
Assemblymen were elected by the public for a one-year term.

New Castle County

- Thomas Duff
- Isaac Grantham
- Peter Hyatt
- John James
- Kensey Johns
- Henry Latimer
- Thomas Montgomery

Kent County

- Joshua Fisher
- Frances Many
- Joseph Oliver
- James Raymond
- Silas Snow
- George Truitt
- Edward White

Sussex County

- John W. Batson
- Jeremiah Cannon
- Wingate Cannon
- John Collins
- Nathaniel Hayes
- William Moore
- Charles Polk Sr.
