= 85th Delaware General Assembly =

American legislative session

←	84th	86th	→

Overview
- Legislative body: Delaware General Assembly
- Term: January 1, 1889 – January 6, 1891

The 85th Delaware General Assembly was a meeting of the legislative branch of the state government, consisting of the Delaware Senate and the Delaware House of Representatives. Elections were held the first Tuesday after November 1 and terms began in Dover on the first Tuesday in January. This date was January 1, 1889, which was two weeks before the beginning of the third administrative year of Governor Benjamin T. Biggs.

Currently the distribution of the Senate Assembly seats was made to three senators for each of the three counties. Likewise the current distribution of the House Assembly seats was made to seven representatives for each of the three counties. The actual population changes of the county did not directly affect the number of senators or representatives at this time.

In the 85th Delaware General Assembly session the Senate had a Democratic majority and the House had a Republican majority.

== Leadership ==
=== Senate ===
- Beniah L. Lewis, Kent County, Democratic

=== House of Representatives ===
- John H. Hoffecker, Kent County, Republican

== Members ==
=== Senate ===
Senators were normally elected by the public for a four-year term; although many were selected to fill the remainder of a vacant position.

New Castle County

- Calvin W. Crossan
- John P. Donahoe
- Colen Ferguson

Kent County

- John E. Collins
- Beniah L. Lewis
- Alden B. Richardson

Sussex County

- Thomas Bacon
- John B. Dorman
- David O. Moore

=== House of Representatives ===
Representatives were elected by the public for a two-year term.

New Castle County

- Theodore F. Armstrong
- William P. Biggs
- Richard C. Brockson
- George W. Eccles
- George W. Gray
- George Lodge
- J. Harvey Whiteman

Kent County

- David S. Clark
- Robert A. Davis
- William R. Davis
- John H. Hoffecker
- George L. Haynson
- John P. Maston
- James Richardson

Sussex County

- McKendree Downham
- John A. Lingo
- Charles H. Maull
- Henry H. Morgan
- Charles H. Sackett
- David Short
- Lewis E. Wallace

== Places with more information ==
- Delaware Historical Society; website; 505 North Market Street, Wilmington, Delaware 19801; (302) 655-7161.
- University of Delaware; Library website; 181 South College Avenue, Newark, Delaware 19717; (302) 831-2965.
