= 81st Delaware General Assembly =

American legislative session

←	80th	82nd	→

Overview
- Legislative body: Delaware General Assembly
- Term: January 4, 1881 – January 3, 1883

The 81st Delaware General Assembly was a meeting of the legislative branch of the government of the U.S. state of Delaware. It consisted of the Delaware Senate and the Delaware House of Representatives. Elections were held the first Tuesday after November 1 and terms began in Dover on the first Tuesday in January. This date was January 4, 1881, which was two weeks before the beginning of the third administrative year of Governor John W. Hall.

Currently the distribution of the Senate Assembly seats was made to three senators for each of the three counties. Likewise the current distribution of the House Assembly seats was made to seven representatives for each of the three counties. The actual population changes of the county did not directly affect the number of senators or representatives at this time.

In the 81st Delaware General Assembly session, both chambers had a Democratic majority.

== Leadership ==
=== Senate ===
- Catesby F. Rust, Sussex County, Democratic

=== House of Representatives ===
- Reynear Williams, Kent County, Democratic

== Members ==
=== Senate ===
Senators were normally elected by the public for a four-year term; although many were selected to fill the remainder of a vacant position.

New Castle County

- Howard Betts
- Joseph W. Cooch
- Charles H. McWhorter

Kent County

- Samuel B. Cooper
- Charles J. Harrington
- Caleb S. Pennewill

Sussex County

- Isaac Conaway
- Andrew J. Horsey
- Catesby F. Rust

=== House of Representatives ===
Representatives were elected by the public for a two-year term.

New Castle County

- Edward G. Bradford Jr.
- David Eastburn
- Andrew Eliason
- John Pilling
- Henry Swayne
- George L. Townsend
- Henry H. Woodkeeper

Kent County

- Alfred H. Cahall
- John W. Graham
- Abraham Moor
- Charles H. Register
- Moses S. Van Burkalow
- Amos C. Williams
- Reynear Williams

Sussex County

- William P. Jones
- Philip C. Mathews
- Joseph G. McNeal
- Peter Robinson
- Amos J. Stayton
- Peter W. Tomlinson
- Thomas N. Williams

== Places with more information ==
- Delaware Historical Society; website; 505 North Market Street, Wilmington, Delaware 19801; (302) 655-7161.
- University of Delaware; Library website; 181 South College Avenue, Newark, Delaware 19717; (302) 831-2965.
