= 87th Delaware General Assembly =

Legislative term in Delaware, USA

←	86th	88th	→

Overview
- Legislative body: Delaware General Assembly
- Term: January 3, 1893 – January 7, 1895

The 87th Delaware General Assembly was a meeting of the legislative branch of the state government, consisting of the Delaware Senate and the Delaware House of Representatives. Elections were held the first Tuesday after November 1 and terms began in Dover on the first Tuesday in January. This year was January 3, 1893, which was two weeks before the beginning of the third administrative year of Governor Robert J. Reynolds.

Currently the distribution of the Senate Assembly seats was made to three senators for each of the three counties. Likewise the current distribution of the House Assembly seats was made to seven representatives for each of the three counties. The actual population changes of the county did not directly affect the number of senators or representatives at this time.

In the 87th Delaware General Assembly session both chambers had a Democratic majority.

== Leadership ==
=== Senate ===
- Charles R. Houston, Sussex County, Democratic

=== House of Representatives ===
- J. Harvey Whiteman, New Castle County, Democratic

== Members ==
=== Senate ===
Senators were normally elected by the public for a four-year term; although many were selected to fill the remainder of a vacant position.

New Castle County

- James McMullin
- John Pilling
- John C. Pyle

Kent County

- John W. Hall
- Thomas T. Lacey
- William T. Watson

Sussex County

- Charles B. Houston
- William T. Records
- William M. Ross

=== House of Representatives ===
Representatives were elected by the public for a two-year term.

New Castle County

- William Cooch
- Harry Day
- James H. S. Gam
- J. Harvey Spruance
- Columbus Watkins
- J. Harvey Whiteman
- Joseph Whitlock

Kent County

- Samuel Armstrong
- Minos Conaway
- William E. Hall
- Hezekiah Harrington
- John D. Pratt
- William Saulsbury
- Abel Sevil

Sussex County

- George A. Bryan
- Robert W. Dasey
- Horace J. Hickman
- John S. Jacobs
- Samuel S. Kenney
- Randall M. Lynch
- John H. Prettyman

== Places with more information ==
- Delaware Historical Society; website; 505 North Market Street, Wilmington, Delaware 19801; (302) 655-7161.
- University of Delaware; Library website; 181 South College Avenue, Newark, Delaware 19717; (302) 831-2965.
