= Howard Clendaniel =

American farmer and politician (1932–2018)

Howard A. Clendaniel (1932 – March 19, 2018) was an American farmer and politician.

Clendaniel was born in Ellendale, Delaware. He was a farmer and raised poultry. Clendaniel served in the Delaware House of Representatives for twelve years. He then served 12 years as Register of Deeds for Sussex County, Delaware, starting in 1995.
