= 86th Delaware General Assembly =

American legislative session

←	85th	87th	→

Overview
- Legislative body: Delaware General Assembly
- Term: January 6, 1891 – January 3, 1893

The 86th Delaware General Assembly was a meeting of the legislative branch of the state government, consisting of the Delaware Senate and the Delaware House of Representatives. Elections were held the first Tuesday after November 1 and terms began in Dover on the first Tuesday in January. This date was January 6, 1891, which was two weeks before the beginning of the first administrative year of Governor Robert J. Reynolds.

Currently the distribution of the Senate Assembly seats was made to three senators for each of the three counties. Likewise the current distribution of the House Assembly seats was made to seven representatives for each of the three counties. The actual population changes of the county did not directly affect the number of senators or representatives at this time.

In the 86th Delaware General Assembly session both chambers had a Democratic majority.

== Leadership ==
=== Senate ===
- John P. Donohoe, New Castle County, Democratic

=== House of Representatives ===
- William L. Sirman, Sussex County, Democratic

== Members ==
=== Senate ===
Senators were normally elected by the public for a four-year term; although many were selected to fill the remainder of a vacant position.

New Castle County

- John P. Donohoe
- James McMullin
- John Pilling

Kent County

- John W. Hall
- Alden B. Richardson
- James Williams

Sussex County

- Charles B. Houston
- David O. Moore
- William M. Ross

=== House of Representatives ===
Representatives were elected by the public for a two-year term.

New Castle County

- John A. Cranston
- Thomas J. Day
- David W. Elkinton
- John C. Higgins
- Thomas B. Smith
- Edwin E. Thomas
- Charles Walton

Kent County

- Thomas Attix
- John M. Eisenbrey
- William T. Hutson
- Gilder D. Jackson
- David D. Marvel
- Perry P. Rickards
- Daniel M. Ridgely

Sussex County

- William H. Chapman
- Horace J. Hickman
- Elihu J. Morris
- Robert R. Morris
- William L. Sirman
- John A. Tindall
- John H. West

== Places with more information ==
- Delaware Historical Society; website; 505 North Market Street, Wilmington, Delaware 19801; (302) 655–7161.
- University of Delaware; Library website; 181 South College Avenue, Newark, Delaware 19717; (302) 831–2965.
