= Charles L. Hebner =

American politician

Member of the Delaware House of Representatives from the 9th district
- In office 1975–1992
- Preceded by: Clarice U. Heckert
- Succeeded by: Oakley M. Banning Jr.

Speaker of the Delaware House of Representatives
- In office 1981–1982
- Preceded by: Robert W. Riddagh
- Succeeded by: Orlando J. George Jr.
- In office 1985–1986
- Preceded by: Orlando J. George Jr.
- Succeeded by: B. Bradford Barnes

Personal details
- Born: April 9, 1926 Baltimore County, Maryland, U.S.
- Died: March 14, 1999 (aged 72) Wilmington, Delaware, U.S.
- Party: Republican
- Education: University of Maryland

Charles L. Hebner (April 9, 1926 – March 14, 1999) was an American politician. He served as a Republican member for the 9th district of the Delaware House of Representatives.

== Life and career ==
Hebner was born in Baltimore County, Maryland. He attended the University of Maryland.

Hebner served in the Delaware House of Representatives from 1975 to 1992.

Hebner died from supranuclear palsy on March 14, 1999, at Forwood Manor Health Care Center in Wilmington.
