= Orlando J. George Jr. =

American politician (1945–2024)

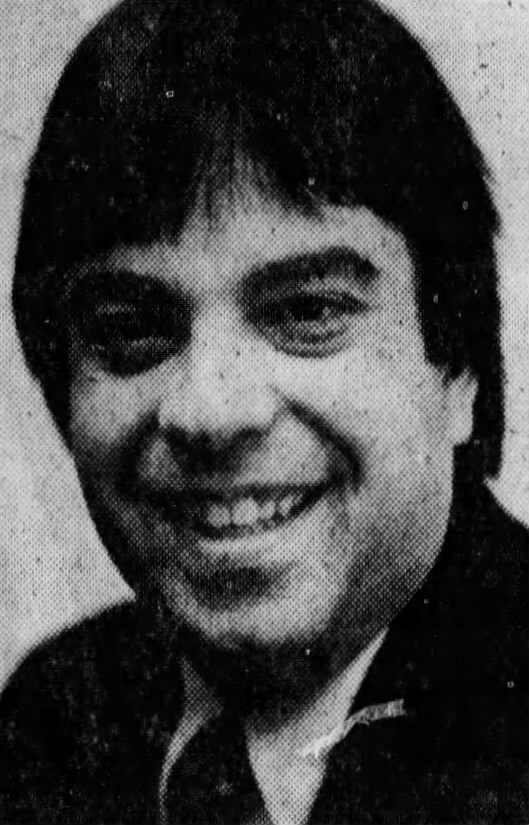
- George in 1982

Member of the Delaware House of Representatives from the 1st district
- In office 1974–1995
- Preceded by: Kermit H. Justice
- Succeeded by: Dennis P. Williams

Speaker of the Delaware House of Representatives
- In office 1983–1984
- Preceded by: Charles L. Hebner
- Succeeded by: Charles L. Hebner

4th President of Delaware Technical Community College
- In office 1995–2014
- Succeeded by: Mark T. Brainard

Personal details
- Born: December 14, 1945 Wilmington, Delaware, U.S.
- Died: May 27, 2024 (aged 78)
- Party: Democratic
- Education: University of Delaware
- Occupation: Academic administrator

Orlando J. George Jr. (December 14, 1945 – May 27, 2024) was an American academic administrator and politician. He served as a Democratic member for the 1st district of the Delaware House of Representatives.

== Life and career ==
George was born in Wilmington, Delaware. He attended the University of Delaware.

George served in the Delaware House of Representatives from 1974 to 1995.

George was president of Delaware Technical Community College from 1995 to 2014.

George died on May 27, 2024, at the age of 78.
