= 52nd Delaware General Assembly =

American legislative session

←	51st	53rd	→

Overview
- Legislative body: Delaware General Assembly
- Term: January 1, 1828 – January 6, 1829

The 52nd Delaware General Assembly (1828–1829) was a meeting of the legislative branch of the state government, consisting of the Delaware Senate and the Delaware House of Representatives. Elections were held the first Tuesday of October and terms began on the first Tuesday in January. It met in Dover, Delaware, convening January 1, 1828, two weeks before the beginning of the second year of the administration of Governor Charles Polk Jr.

The apportionment of seats was permanently assigned to three senators and seven representatives for each of the three counties. Population of the county did not affect the number of delegates. Both chambers had a Federalist majority.

== Leadership ==
=== Senate ===
- Presley Spruance Jr., Kent County

=== House of Representatives ===
- William W. Morris, Kent County

== Members ==
=== Senate ===
Senators were elected by the public for a three-year term, one third posted each year.

New Castle County

- Levi Boulden
- Thomas Deakyne
- John Harlan

Kent County

- Elias Naudain Jr.
- Joseph G. Oliver
- Presley Spruance Jr.

Sussex County

- Joseph Maull
- Peter Robinson
- Purnal Tindall

=== House of Representatives ===
Representatives were elected by the public for a one-year term.

New Castle County

- James Delaplane
- Daniel Newbold
- William T. Read
- William Seal
- Harman Talley
- Christopher Vandegrift
- Benjamin Whitely

Kent County

- John Booth
- Peter L. Cooper Sr.
- Mathias Day
- James P. Lofland
- William W. Morris
- John Raymond
- Samuel Virden

Sussex County

- Thomas Davis
- William Dunning
- Caleb S. Layton
- Kendall M. Lewis
- John Tennent
- George Truitt
- John White

== Places with more information ==
- Delaware Historical Society; website; 505 North Market Street, Wilmington, Delaware 19801; (302) 655-7161.
- University of Delaware; Library website; 181 South College Avenue, Newark, Delaware 19717; (302) 831-2965.
