= William H. Vernon =

American politician

William (Bill) H. Vernon, Sr. (June 29, 1944 – March 10, 2014) was an American businessman and politician.

Born in Odessa, Delaware, he grew up in Rehoboth Beach, Delaware. He graduated from Rehoboth High School and Georgia Institute of Technology. Vernon then served in the United States Coast Guard which included a tour of duty in Vietnam. Vernon owned Vernon Real Estate and later became a V.P. with Coldwell Banker. He served in the Delaware House of Representatives from 1977 to 1981 as a Republican.
