= Henrietta R. Johnson =

American politician (1914–1997)

Member of the Delaware House of Representatives
- In office 1971–1979

Personal details
- Born: Henrietta Richardson; July 14, 1914 Baltimore, Maryland, US
- Died: October 21, 1997 (aged 83) Wilmington, Delaware, US
- Party: Democratic
- Occupation: Nurse, politician
- Awards: Inducted into the Hall of Fame of Delaware Women (1998)

Henrietta Richardson Johnson (July 24, 1914 – October 21, 1997) was an American nurse and the first African American woman to serve in the Delaware General Assembly. Elected in 1970 to the Delaware House of Representatives, she was inducted into the Hall of Fame of Delaware Women in 1998.

== Biography ==
Born in Baltimore, Maryland, on July 24, 1914, Johnson worked as a registered nurse for over 20 years. Elected as a Democrat in 1970, she served four two-year terms in the Delaware House of Representatives representing Wilmington's 3rd District. She lost the Democratic primary election in 1978 to Herman M. Holloway Jr., son of Black state senator Herman Holloway, who went on to serve four terms in the House.

Johnson was the first African American woman to serve in the Delaware General Assembly. She supported legislation to integrate racially the Delaware State Police and provide childcare and healthcare to pregnant and unwed teenagers, distribution of federal food stamps to low-income citizens, financial assistance to senior citizen organizations, renovations to public schools, and community-based social services.

Johnson championed the Southbridge Medical Activity Center in Wilmington, Delaware. The first privately funded community health center for low-income patients in Delaware, the facility was renamed the Henrietta R. Johnson Community Center in her honor in 1980. It was renamed to the Henrietta R. Johnson Medical Center ten years later and continues to exist as a fully fledged medical and dental community health center.

Born Henrietta Richardson, Johnson was married to Johnnie B. Johnson until their divorce. She died of unspecified natural causes at Christiana Hospital in Wilmington on October 21, 1997, at the age of 83. She was inducted into the Hall of Fame of Delaware Women in 1998.
