= Herman Holloway =

American politician in Delaware

Herman M. Holloway Sr. (February 4, 1922 – March 14, 1994) was a state legislator in Delaware. He lived in Wilmington.

Holloway was elected in 1963 to serve the remaining term of Paul Livingston in the Delaware House of Representatives. He went on to serve for 30 years from 1963 - 1994 in the state legislature.

A state health and social services campus is named for him at the Delaware State Hospital site. In 1989 Compton Park, formerly named for Spencer Compton, 1st Earl of Wilmington, was renamed for him. A scholarship to Delaware State University is also named from him.

His son Herman Holloway Jr. also served as a state legislator.

== See also ==
- List of first African-American U.S. state legislators
