= Terry R. Spence =

American politician

Speaker of the Delaware House of Representatives
- In office January 13, 1987 – January 13, 2009
- Preceded by: B. Bradford Barnes
- Succeeded by: Robert Gilligan

Member of the Delaware House of Representatives from the 18th district
- In office January 11, 1983 – January 13, 2009
- Preceded by: Richard C. Cathcart
- Succeeded by: Michael A. Barbieri

Member of the Delaware House of Representatives from the 20th district
- In office January 13, 1981 – January 11, 1983
- Preceded by: John P. Ferguson
- Succeeded by: Roger P. Roy

Personal details
- Born: November 30, 1941 (age 84) Wilmington, Delaware, U.S.
- Party: Republican
- Spouse: Nancy
- Children: 4
- Education: Goldey–Beacom College (AS); Wilmington College (BS)

Terry R. Spence (born November 30, 1941) is an American politician from New Castle, Delaware. He is a member of the Republican Party, who served in the Delaware General Assembly and as Speaker of the Delaware House of Representatives. He was defeated in the 2008 election by Democrat Michael A. Barbieri and lost an attempt to regain his seat in 2010. Though a social conservative, Spence's representation of his middle class and union voters in his district often put him at odds with other Republican Party leaders. He qualified and received votes for the Working Families Party in 2008 and 2010 in addition to the Republican Party.

== Early life and career ==
Spence was born in Wilmington, Delaware and grew up in New Castle. His father, Ernest Spence Jr., was a state trooper who had run for the 6th district seat on the New Castle County Council in 1972.

Spence received an associate degree in business from Goldey–Beacom College and later a bachelor's degree from Wilmington College. He served in the Delaware Air National Guard and later became a state trooper with the Delaware State Police like his father.

== Political career ==
Upon the retirement of four-term Democratic state representative John P. Ferguson in 1980, Spence ran as a Republican for Ferguson's seat in the 20th representative district. Despite the district's Democratic leaning, the nationwide Republican tide led by presidential candidate Ronald Reagan helped propel Spence to a six-point victory over Democrat John Zimath. In 1982, redistricting caused by the United States Census changed his district number from 20 to 18. He was reelected to the House over Democrat Ronald Queen with 63 percent of the vote. He was unopposed in seven of his thirteen reelection campaigns and often won reelection with large margins.

In 2006, Spence faced a tough reelection due to the increasing percentage of Democrats in his district, with 49 percent of voters registered as Democrats and only 26% registered as Republicans, and with the unpopularity of Republican president George W. Bush. Spence was viewed as vulnerable by the Democratic Party of Delaware, who recruited Michael Barbieri to run against him. It was his closest race since he initially won election in 1980, but he still defeated Barbieri by over 12 points. Barbieri challenged him again in the 2008 election. This time, owing to long coattails from the presidential race (with Senator Joe Biden as Barack Obama's running mate), Barbieri won the election by six points. Spence sought a rematch in 2010 and lost by 13 points.

=== Speaker of the House ===
In 1987, the Republicans in the Delaware House elected B. Bradford Barnes from Bridgeville as Speaker of the House. However, Barnes died in office shortly thereafter, and Spence, who was elected in the same year as Barnes, was then chosen to succeed him as Speaker. He served as speaker until he lost his reelection in 2008, eventually becoming the longest serving Speaker of the House in the history of the Delaware General Assembly. He has also held the position of Speaker longer than any other Speaker of a state legislature in the history of the United States.

In 2006, Spence and Majority Leader Wayne Smith were opposed for their leadership positions in the Republican Caucus by Joseph W. Booth and Richard C. Cathcart, respectively. However, Republicans retained their majority in the Delaware House and lost only two seats in the 2006 elections that saw large Republican losses throughout the country. House Republicans voted to keep the leadership that had led them through the tumultuous election. After being reelected Speaker, Spence appointed Booth and Cathcart to the powerful appropriations and joint finance committees.

=== 2000 gubernatorial race ===
In 1991 and 1995, Spence explored the possibility of running for governor, but in both cases decided not to challenge popular Democrat Tom Carper. In 2000, however, he decided to run and entered the Republican gubernatorial primary. Unfortunately, his past record of support for labor worked against him as the support of the party's hierarchy and the state's business leaders quickly coalesced around chairman of the state Chamber of Commerce and former state house majority leader John M. Burris. Due to an inability to raise campaign funds, Spence withdrew from the race before the September primary election in order to run for reelection to the House and endorsed Burris, the eventual Republican nominee who went on to lose the general election to then Lieutenant Governor Ruth Ann Minner.

== Electoral history ==
Year	Office	Election	Winner	Party	Votes	%	Opponent	Party	Votes	%	Source
1980	Delaware State Representative, District 20	General	Terry R. Spence	Republican	3,035	53.1%	John H. Zimath	Democratic	2,683	46.9%	
1982	Delaware State Representative, District 18	General	Terry R. Spence	Republican	2,485	62.5%	Ronald E. Queen	Democratic	1,488	37.5%	
1984	Delaware State Representative, District 18	General	Terry R. Spence	Republican	4,082	73.7%	Samuel R. Richeon	Democratic	1,453	26.3%	
1986	Delaware State Representative, District 18	General	Terry R. Spence	Republican	2,290	77.2%	William H. Hartzel	Democratic	676	22.8%	
1988	Delaware State Representative, District 18	General	Terry R. Spence	Republican	3,797	100%	unopposed	-	-	-	
1990	Delaware State Representative, District 18	General	Terry R. Spence	Republican	2,468	100%	unopposed	-	-	-	
1992	Delaware State Representative, District 18	General	Terry R. Spence	Republican	4,484	100%	unopposed	-	-	-	
1994	Delaware State Representative, District 18	General	Terry R. Spence	Republican	2,718	71.4%	Susan N. Mangini	Democratic	1,088	28.6%	
1996	Delaware State Representative, District 18	General	Terry R. Spence	Republican	4,551	100%	unopposed	-	-	-	
1998	Delaware State Representative, District 18	General	Terry R. Spence	Republican	2,245	100%	unopposed	-	-	-	
2000	Delaware State Representative, District 18	General	Terry R. Spence	Republican	3,931	58.2%	Frances Anglin	Democratic	2,823	41.8%	
2002	Delaware State Representative, District 18	General	Terry R. Spence	Republican	3,221	100%	unopposed	-	-	-	
2004	Delaware State Representative, District 18	General	Terry R. Spence	Republican	5,118	100%	unopposed	-	-	-	
2006	Delaware State Representative, District 18	General	Terry R. Spence	Republican	2,724	56.2	Michael A. Barbieri	Democratic	2,083	43.8%	
2008	Delaware State Representative, District 18	General	Michael A. Barbieri	Democratic	4,164	52.0%	Terry R. Spence	Republican	3,760	46.9	
2010	Delaware State Representative, District 18	General	Michael A. Barbieri	Democratic	3,115	53.0%	Terry R. Spence	Republican	2,766	47.0	

=== Terms in public office ===
Office	Type	Location	Election Year	Term Start	Term Ended
State House	Legislature	Dover	1980	January 13, 1981	January 11, 1983
State House	Legislature	Dover	1982	January 11, 1983	January 15, 1985
State House	Legislature	Dover	1984	January 15, 1985	January 13, 1987
State House	Legislature	Dover	1986	January 13, 1987	January 10, 1989
State House	Legislature	Dover	1988	January 10, 1989	January 8, 1991
State House	Legislature	Dover	1990	January 8, 1991	January 12, 1993
State House	Legislature	Dover	1992	January 12, 1993	January 10, 1995
State House	Legislature	Dover	1994	January 10, 1995	January 14, 1997
State House	Legislature	Dover	1996	January 14, 1997	January 12, 1999
State House	Legislature	Dover	1998	January 12, 1999	January 9, 2001
State House	Legislature	Dover	2000	January 9, 2001	January 14, 2003
State House	Legislature	Dover	2002	January 14, 2003	January 11, 2005
State House	Legislature	Dover	2004	January 11, 2005	January 9, 2007
State House	Legislature	Dover	2006	January 9, 2007	January 13, 2009

== Personal life ==
Spence and his wife, Nancy, have four children—Terry, Greg, Mark, and Laura. His sons Greg and Mark also became Delaware State Troopers.

Delaware House of Representatives
Preceded by John P. Ferguson	Member of the Delaware House of Representatives from the 20th district 1981–1983	Succeeded by Roger P. Roy
Preceded by Richard C. Cathcart	Member of the Delaware House of Representatives from the 18th district 1983–2009	Succeeded by Michael Barbieri
Preceded by B. Bradford Barnes	Speaker of the Delaware House of Representatives; 1987–2009	Succeeded by Robert Gilligan
