= Richard S. Cordrey =

American farmer, businessman, and politician (1933–2022)

Richard Cordrey
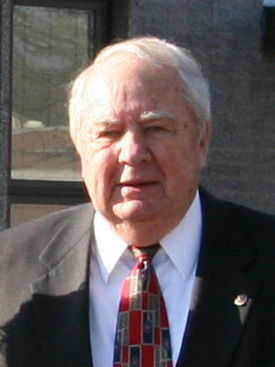
- Cordrey in 2012

President pro tempore of the Delaware Senate
- In office 1977–1997
- Preceded by: J. Donald Isaacs
- Succeeded by: Thurman Adams Jr.

Member of the Delaware Senate from the 20th district
- In office 1973–1997
- Preceded by: New seat
- Succeeded by: George Bunting Jr.

Member of the Delaware House of Representatives from the 38th district
- In office 1971–1973
- Preceded by: George Edward Gray
- Succeeded by: Howard Clendaniel

Personal details
- Born: September 8, 1933 Millsboro, Delaware, U.S.
- Died: August 21, 2022 (aged 88) Millsboro, Delaware
- Party: Democratic
- Spouse: Mary Jane Cordrey
- Education: Goldey-Beacom College

Richard S. Cordrey (September 8, 1933 – August 21, 2022) was an American farmer, businessman, and politician from Delaware. He served in both chambers of the Delaware General Assembly, in the State Senate from 1973 to 1997 and in the House of Representatives from 1971 to 1973. He also served as president pro tem of the State Senate for twenty years from 1977 to 1997 and as the Secretary of Finance of Delaware from 2005 to 2009.

== Biography ==
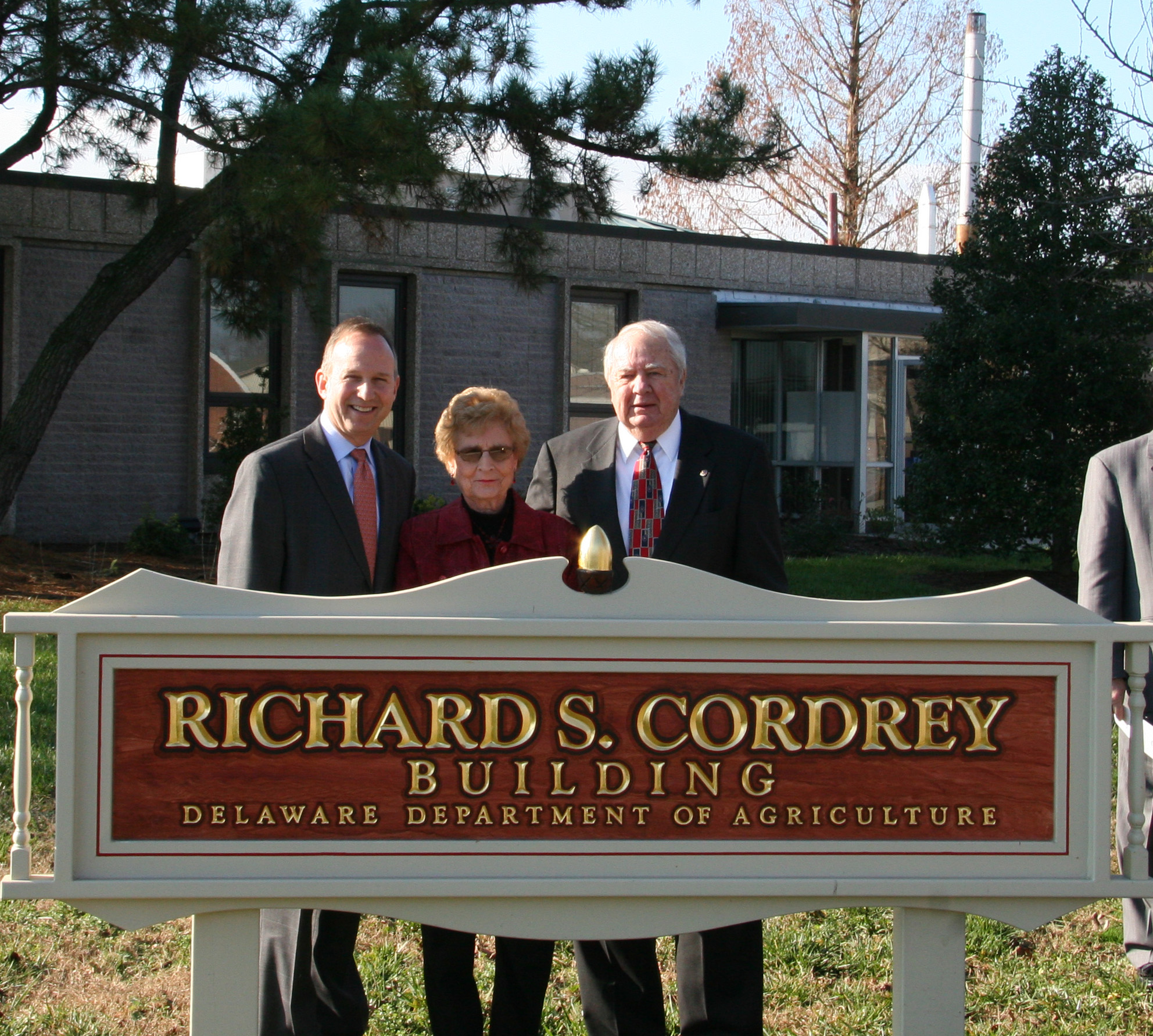
Governor Jack Markell (left), Mary Jane Cordrey (center), and Richard S. Cordrey (right) at the unveiling of a Delaware Department of Agriculture building dedicated to Cordrey.

Cordrey was born and lived in Millsboro, Delaware, with his wife and family, and graduated from the Millsboro High School in 1951. He was a grain and poultry farmer. Cordrey also worked with the family business, the John A. Cordrey Feed Company. Cordrey served in the United States Army and was stationed at Fort Gordon in Georgia. Cordrey also went to the Goldey–Beacom College. Cordrey served on the Millsboro Town Council from 1965 to 1973. Cordrey then served in the Delaware House of Representatives from 1971 to 1973 and in the Delaware Senate from 1973 to 1997. He then served as the Delaware Secretary of Finance from 2005 to 2009. He was a Democrat. Cordrey died at his home in Millsboro, Delaware, the city where his funeral and burial took place.

Delaware House of Representatives
Preceded by George Edward Gray	Member of the Delaware House of Representatives from the 38th district 1971–1973	Succeeded by Howard Clendaniel
Delaware Senate
Preceded by District created	Member of the Delaware Senate from the 20th district 1973–1997	Succeeded by George H. Bunting Jr.
Preceded by J. Donald Isaacs	President pro tempore of the Delaware Senate; 1977–1997	Succeeded by Thurman Adams Jr.
Government offices
Preceded by David W. Singleton	Secretary of Finance of Delaware; 2005–2009	Succeeded by Thomas J. Cook
