= Harris McDowell III =

American politician from Delaware

Member of the Delaware Senate from the 1st district
- In office November 3, 1976 – November 4, 2020
- Preceded by: Mike Castle
- Succeeded by: Sarah McBride

Personal details
- Born: Harris Brown McDowell III; March 15, 1940 (age 86) Middletown, Delaware, U.S.
- Party: Democratic
- Parent: Harris McDowell (father)
- Education: University of Delaware; Georgetown University

Military service
- Branch/service: United States Marine Corps
- Years of service: 1960–1966

Harris Brown McDowell III (born March 15, 1940) is a retired American politician. He was a Democratic member of the Delaware Senate from 1976 to 2020, representing the 1st district. He attended the University of Delaware and Georgetown University, and is the son of former Delaware congressman Harris McDowell Jr.

== Electoral history ==
- 1976: When Republican Senator Mike Castle left the Senate district 1 seat open, McDowell won the 1976 Democratic primary and won the November 1976 general election with 5,806 votes (52.2%) against Republican nominee Kermit Justice.
- 1980: McDowell won the 1980 Democratic primary and won the November 1980 general election with 6,354 votes (56.4%) against Republican nominee Sandra Kaufmann.
- 1982: McDowell won the 1982 Democratic primary and won the three-way November 1982 general election with 7,239 votes (62.5%) against Republican nominee Richard Bugbee and Libertarian candidate Susan Bissell.
- 1986: McDowell was unopposed for both the September 1986 Democratic primary and the November 1986 general election, winning with 5,946 votes.
- 1990: McDowell won the 1992 Democratic primary and won the November 1990 general election with 5,467 votes (59.2%) against Republican nominee Paul Parets.
- 1992: McDowell and Parets were both unopposed for their September 1992 primaries, setting up a rematch; McDowell won the November 1992 general election with 8,808 votes (63.5%) against Parets.
- 1996: McDowell won the September 1996 Democratic primary with 2,368 votes (66.2%) against Thornton Carroll, and won the November 1996 general election with 7,883 votes (61.6%) against Republican nominee Gary Linarducci.
- 2000: McDowell was unopposed for the September 2000 Democratic primary and won the November 2000 general election with 8,970 votes (63.6%) against Republican nominee Lee Murphy.
- 2002: McDowell won the September 2002 Democratic primary with 1,388 votes (63.7%), again against his 1996 challenger Thornton Carroll. Lee Murphy was unopposed for his primary, setting up a rematch; McDowell won the November 2002 general election with 7,646 votes (64.1%) against Murphy.
- 2006: McDowell won the four-way September 2006 Democratic primary with 1,477 votes (49.5%) against a field that included Charles Potter Jr. and Thornton Carroll, his challenger from 1996 and 2002. McDowell won the three-way November 2006 general election with 8,300 votes (64.6%) against Republican nominee Gregory Chambers and Independent candidate Tyler Nixon.
- 2010: McDowell was unopposed for both the September 2010 Democratic primary and the November 2010 general election, winning with 11,862 votes.
- 2012: McDowell won the three-way September 2012 Democratic primary with 2,342 votes (52.2%) against former state representative David Brady and another challenger. McDowell won the three-way November 2012 general election with 15,155 votes (85.3%) against Independent candidate Robert Clark and Libertarian candidate Brian Lintz.

Delaware Senate
Preceded by Mike Castle	Member of the Delaware Senate from the 1st district 1976–2020	Succeeded by Sarah McBride
