= 104th Delaware General Assembly =

American legislative session

←	103rd	105th	→

Overview
- Legislative body: Delaware General Assembly
- Term: January 4, 1927 – January 8, 1929

The 104th Delaware General Assembly was a meeting of the legislative branch of the state government, consisting of the Delaware Senate and the Delaware House of Representatives. Elections were held the first Tuesday after November 1 and terms began in Dover on the first Tuesday in January. This date was January 4, 1927, which was two weeks before the beginning of the third administrative year of Governor Robert P. Robinson and James H. Anderson as Lieutenant Governor.

Currently the distribution of the Senate Assembly seats was made to seven senators for New Castle County and for five senators to each Kent and Sussex counties. Likewise the current distribution of the House Assembly seats was made to fifteen representatives for New Castle County and for ten representatives each to Kent and Sussex counties. The actual population changes of the county did not directly affect the number of senators or representatives at this time.

In the 104th Delaware General Assembly session the Senate had a Democratic majority and the House had a Republican majority.

== Leadership ==
=== Senate ===
- William F. Allen, Sussex County, Democratic

=== House of Representatives ===
- William Wintrup, New Castle County, Republican

== Members ==
=== Senate ===
About half of the State Senators were elected every two years for a four-year term. They were from a district in a specific county, with the number of districts determined by the state constitution, not the size of the population.

New Castle County

- 1. William A. Simonton
- 2. Leroy Kramer
- 3. Benjamin R. Veasey
- 4. William Lord
- 5. Joseph N. Reeves
- 6. Frank R. Pool
- 7. Elmer David

Kent County

- 1. Hervey P. Hall
- 2. John W. Attix
- 3. Joshua B. Wharton
- 4. Willard S. Jester
- 5. James H. Latchum Jr.

Sussex County

- 1. Harry M. Deputy
- 2. William F. Allen
- 3. Willard F. Deputy
- 4. Elisha A. Steele
- 5. Gove S. Lynch

=== House of Representatives ===
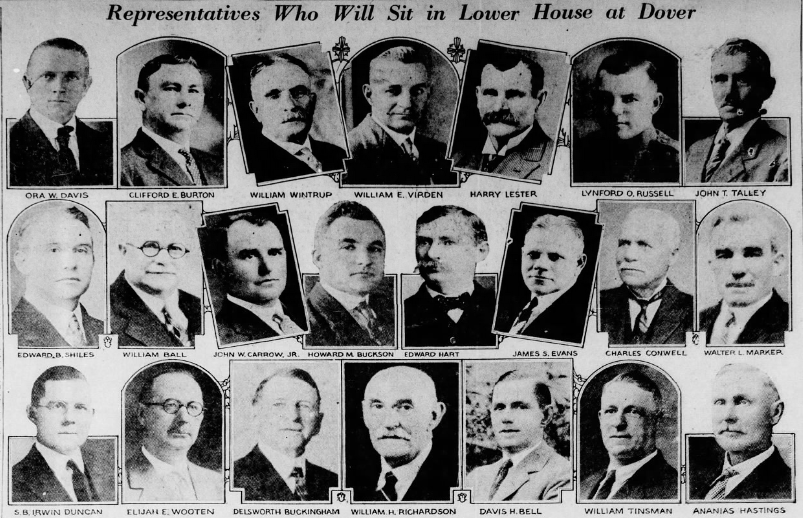
Members of the House of Representatives

All the State Representatives were elected every two years for a two-year term. They were from a district in a specific county, with the number of districts determined by the state constitution, not the size of the population.

New Castle County

- 1. Joseph Scheifele
- 2. William Wintrub
- 3. James S. Evans
- 4. William E. Virden
- 5. Michael J. Maloney
- 6. John T. Talley
- 7. William Tinsman
- 8. Delsworth Buckingham
- 9. Clarence E. McVey
- 10. S. B. Irwin Duncan
- 11. James L. Ford
- 12. Harvey Lester
- 13. John W. Carrow Jr.
- 14. Edward H. Hart
- 15. Walter L. Marker

Kent County

- 1. Davis H. Bell
- 2. Howard M. Buckson
- 3. John W. Smith
- 4. John Ashton
- 5. William Ball
- 6. William O. Cubbage
- 7. Charles S. Conwell
- 8. William C. Paradee
- 9. John W. Sheldrake
- 10. Ora W. Davis

Sussex County

- 1. William H. Richardson
- 2. Thomas C. Curry
- 3. Daniel W. Ellis
- 4. Edward B. Shiles
- 5. Elijah W. Wooten
- 6. Ananias Hastings
- 7. James B. Dickerson
- 8. Clifford E. Burton
- 9. Frank E. Smith
- 10. Lynford O. Russell

== Places with more information ==
- Delaware Historical Society; website; 505 North Market Street, Wilmington, Delaware 19801; (302) 655-7161.
- University of Delaware; Library website; 181 South College Avenue, Newark, Delaware 19717; (302) 831-2965.
