= 108th Delaware General Assembly =

American legislative session

←	107th	109th	→

Overview
- Legislative body: Delaware General Assembly
- Term: January 8, 1935 – January 5, 1937

The 108th Delaware General Assembly was a meeting of the legislative branch of the state government, consisting of the Delaware Senate and the Delaware House of Representatives. Elections were held on the first Tuesday after November 1, and terms began in Dover on the first Tuesday in January. This date was January 8, 1935, two weeks before the beginning of the seventh administrative year of Governor C. Douglass Buck and the third administrative year of Roy F. Corley as Lieutenant Governor.

Currently, the distribution of the Senate Assembly seats comprises seven senators for New Castle County and five for each Kent and Sussex County. Likewise, the current distribution of the House Assembly seats comprises fifteen representatives for New Castle County and ten representatives each to the Kent and Sussex counties. The actual population changes of the county did not directly affect the number of senators or representatives at this time.

In the 108th Delaware General Assembly session, both chambers had a Republican majority.

== Leadership ==
=== Senate ===
- Levi G. Maloney, New Castle County, Republican

=== House of Representatives ===
- Harry V. Lyons, Sussex County, Republican

== Members ==
=== Senate ===
About half of the State Senators were elected every two years for a four-year term. They were from a district in a specific county, and the number of districts was determined by the state constitution, not the size of the population.

New Castle County

- 1. William A. Simonton
- 2. Edward I. Glenn
- 3. Donald P. Ross
- 4. Carl R. Vansant
- 5. Norris N. Wright
- 6. W. Maily Davis
- 7. Levi G. Maloney

Kent County

- 1. William E. Matthews Jr.
- 2. Charles A. Neugebauer
- 3. Frank C. Bancroft
- 4. Milton T. Frasher
- 5. James L. Davis

Sussex County

- 1. Samuel M. D. Marshall
- 2. John R. Cannon
- 3. Ebe H. Chandler
- 4. James B. McCabe
- 5. Fred A. Walls

=== House of Representatives ===
All the State Representatives were elected every two years for a two-year term. They were from a district in a specific county, and the number of districts was determined by the state constitution, not the size of the population.

New Castle County

- 1. Leo J. Dugan
- 2. Frank R. Zebley
- 3. James S. Evans
- 4. Sigmund Schorr
- 5. Joseph M. Brogan
- 6. Burton S. Heal
- 7. Henry C. White
- 8. Robert B. Kelton
- 9. George I. Durnall
- 10. James G. Shaw
- 11. Archie L. Peel
- 12. George R. Clark
- 13. Frank R. Pool
- 14. Joseph C. Hutchinson
- 15. William T. Hobson

Kent County

- 1. William G. Roe
- 2. Howard M. Buckson
- 3. Carroll B. Brown
- 4. Randolph Hughes
- 5. Morris Simon
- 6. Harry J. Dill
- 7. Leon A. Bailey
- 8. F. Leslie Rentz
- 9. Walter J. Paskey Jr.
- 10. Willard R. Pierce

Sussex County

- 1. Lawrence E. Warren
- 2. Alvin O. Baker
- 3. Leroy B. Hurley
- 4. John M. Tyndall
- 5. Fred M. Wright
- 6. James J. Esham
- 7. Albert P. Lekites
- 8. William D. Steele
- 9. Frank L. Joseph
- 10. Harry V. Lyons
