= 101st Delaware General Assembly =

American legislative session

←	100th	102nd	→

Overview
- Legislative body: Delaware General Assembly
- Term: January 4, 1921 – January 2, 1923

The 101st Delaware General Assembly was a meeting of the legislative branch of the state government, consisting of the Delaware Senate and the Delaware House of Representatives. Elections were held the first Tuesday after November 1 and terms began in Dover on the first Tuesday in January. This date was January 4, 1921, which was two weeks before the beginning of the first administrative year of Governor William D. Denney and J. Danforth Bush as Lieutenant Governor.

The distribution of the Senate Assembly was made to seven senators for New Castle County and for five senators each to Kent and Sussex counties. Likewise, the distribution of the House Assembly was made to fifteen representatives for New Castle County and ten representatives each to Kent and Sussex County. The actual population changes of the county did not directly affect the number of senators or representatives at this time.

In the 101st Delaware General Assembly session, the Senate had a Republican majority and the House had a Democratic majority.

== Leadership ==
=== Senate ===
- Wallace S. Handy, Kent County, Republican

=== House of Representatives ===
- Walter J. Paskey Sr., Kent County, Democratic

== Members ==
=== Senate ===
About half of the State Senators were elected every two years for a four-year term. They were from a district in a specific county, with the number of districts determined by the state constitution, not the size of the population.

New Castle County

- 1. James W. Robertson
- 2. William J. Lutz
- 3. George W. Webster
  - John G. Highfield Jr.
- 4. John M. Walker
- 5. John F. Richards
- 6. James McIntire
- 7. John E. Latta

Kent County

- 1. Lewis M. Price
- 2. Charles C. Hopkins
- 3. James F. Allee Jr.
- 4. Charles D. Murphy
- 5. Wallace S. Handy

Sussex County

- 1. Isaac D. Short
- 2. George B. Insley
- 3. Asa Bennett
- 4. Harry Prettyman
- 5. James C. Palmer

=== House of Representatives ===
All the State Representatives were elected every two years for a two-year term. They were from a district in a specific county, with the number of districts determined by the state constitution, not the size of the population.

New Castle County

- 1. Harry W. Marr
- 2. Robert W. Kramer
- 3. Henry Wilson
- 4. William E. Virden
- 5. Samuel J. White
- 6. Frank C. Miller
- 7. William Lord
- 8. Richard G. Buckingham
- 9. Charles L. Medill
- 10. Edward S. Megginson
- 11. William J. Crompton
- 12. Edward Lester Jr.
- 13. Alexander P. Corbit
- 14. Walter Lee
- 15. Jefferson A. Staats

Kent County

- 1. John E. Wilson Sr.
- 2. William B. Harrington
- 3. Harry B. Clark
- 4. Robert J. Schneider
- 5. Frank H. Davis
- 6. Walter J. Paskey Sr.
- 7. Willard S. Brown
- 8. Edward Dill
- 9. P. H. Noble
- 10. B. F. Davis

Sussex County

- 1. Henry E. Clendaniel
- 2. Charles H. Kinder
- 3. Samuel S. Gray
- 4. John T. Phillips
- 5. George H. Otwell
- 6. Seth H. Hudson
- 7. Elmer J. Turner
- 8. John D. Warrington
- 9. Hiram S. Smith
- 10. Thomas W. Turner

== Places with more information ==
- Delaware Historical Society; website; 505 North Market Street, Wilmington, Delaware 19801; (302) 655-7161.
- University of Delaware; Library website; 181 South College Avenue, Newark, Delaware 19717; (302) 831-2965.
