= 1936 Delaware gubernatorial election =

- November 3, 1936
Nominee	Richard McMullen	Harry L. Cannon	I. Dolphus Short
Party	Democratic	Republican	Independent Republican
Popular vote	62,437	52,782	8,500
Percentage	50.36%	42.57%	6.86%
- County results McMullen: 40–50% 50–60%
Governor before election
C. Douglass Buck
Republican
Elected Governor
Richard McMullen
Democratic

The 1936 Delaware gubernatorial election was held on November 3, 1936. Incumbent Republican Governor C. Douglass Buck was barred from seeking re-election to a third term, creating an open race. A challenging contest developed on the Republican side to succeed Buck, with Harry L. Cannon, former State Senator I. Dolphus Short and Assistant Motor Vehicle Commissioner George S. Williams all emerging as frontrunners. Cannon, a longtime figure in state politics who served as a member of the State Board of Agriculture and on the University of Delaware Board of Trustees, ultimately won the nomination. Short walked out of the convention, however, and shortly thereafter organized a slate of statewide candidates as Independent Republicans, dividing the party.

On the Democratic side, a close contest developed among former Wilmington City Councilman Richard McMullen and attorneys Edward W. Cooch and Henry Isaacs. McMullen ultimately won the nomination on the first ballot at the state convention, and was quickly endorsed by his opponents.

In the general election, McMullen ended up winning over Cannon by a fairly wide margin. Short siphoned support away from Cannon, receiving 7% of the vote. However, the schism was likely not dispositive by itself; McMullen won 50% of the vote to Cannon's 43%. McMullen's victory, the first win for a Democratic candidate for Governor since 1896, (and the win with an outright majority of the vote since 1890,) occurred as President Franklin D. Roosevelt was handily winning the state over Republican presidential nominee Alf Landon.

== General election ==
1936 Delaware gubernatorial election
Party	Candidate	Votes	%	±%
Democratic	Richard McMullen	62,437	50.36%	+5.48%
Republican	Harry L. Cannon	52,782	42.57%	−11.66%
Independent Republican	I. Dolphus Short	8,500	6.86%	—
Socialist	Fred W. Whiteside	198	0.16%	−0.63%
Communist	John T. Wladkoski	70	0.06%	−0.05%
Majority		9,655	7.79%	−1.56%
Turnout		123,987	100.00%	
Democratic gain from Republican				

== Bibliography ==
- Delaware House Journal, 106th General Assembly, 1st Reg. Sess. (1937).
