= 99th Delaware General Assembly =

American legislative session

←	98th	100th	→

Overview
- Legislative body: Delaware General Assembly
- Term: January 2, 1917 – January 7, 1919

The 99th Delaware General Assembly was a meeting of the legislative branch of the state government, consisting of the Delaware Senate and the Delaware House of Representatives. Elections were held the first Tuesday after November 1 and terms began in Dover on the first Tuesday in January. This date was January 2, 1917, which was two weeks before the beginning of the first administrative year of Governor John G. Townsend Jr. and Lewis E. Eliason as Lieutenant Governor.

Currently the distribution of the Senate Assembly seats was made to seven senators for New Castle County and for five senators to each Kent and Sussex counties. Likewise the current distribution of the House Assembly seats was made to fifteen representatives for New Castle County and for ten representatives each to Kent and Sussex counties. The actual population changes of the county did not directly affect the number of senators or representatives at this time.

In the 99th Delaware General Assembly session the Senate had a Republican majority and the House had a Democratic majority.

== Leadership ==
=== Senate ===
- John A. Barnard, Kent County, Republican

=== House of Representatives ===
- Hervey P. Hall, Kent County, Democratic

== Members ==
=== Senate ===
About half of the State Senators were elected every two years for a four-year term. They were from a district in a specific county, with the number of districts determined by the state constitution, not the size of the population.

New Castle County

- 1. James B. Hickman
- 2. Thomas F. Gormley
- 3. Thomas S. Webb
- 4. John M. Walker
- 5. Harvey Hoffecker
- 6. Zachary T. Harris
- 7. Edward H. Hart

Kent County

- 1. Charles M. Wharton
- 2. Henry Williams
- 3. John A. Barnard
- 4. Edward B. Carter
- 5. Joseph Frazier

Sussex County

- 1. Oliver A. Newton
- 2. Samuel J. Furniss
- 3. Charles W. Mitchell
- 4. Harry J. Anderson
- 5. Harlan M. Joseph

=== House of Representatives ===
All the State Representatives were elected every two years for a two-year term. They were from a district in a specific county, with the number of districts determined by the state constitution, not the size of the population.

New Castle County

- 1. Walter Rash
- 2. Andrew L. Cross
- 3. Henry C. Downward
- 4. John E. McNabb
- 5. William M. Connelly
- 6. George W. Webster
- 7. William S. Gregg
- 8. Richard G. Buckingham
- 9. W. Truxton Boyce
- 10. Harry P. Ahern
- 11. Thomas J. Green
- 12. Irving G. Ellison
- 13. Martin B. Burris
- 14. Joseph C. Hutchinson
- 15. William L. Collins

Kent County

- 1. Hervey P. Hall
- 2. John W. Tarburton
- 3. Daniel F. Loose
- 4. Edward C. Daley
- 5. Edward L. Jones
- 6. Cooper Gruwell
- 7. George B. Kersey
- 8. John W. Killen
- 9. G. W. Swain
- 10. Albert B. Peet

Sussex County

- 1. John Prettyman
- 2. Coulter Messick
- 3. Edwin H. Tindall
- 4. James T. Chipman
- 5. Samuel N. Culver
- 6. Silas J. Lewis
- 7. David C. Hall
- 8. George D. Marvel
- 9. Thomas J. Pitchett Jr.
- 10. William H. Welch

== Places with more information ==
- Delaware Historical Society; website; 505 North Market Street, Wilmington, Delaware 19801; (302) 655-7161.
- University of Delaware; Library website; 181 South College Avenue, Newark, Delaware 19717; (302) 831-2965.
