= Governor McMullen =

Governor McMullen may refer to:

- Adam McMullen (1872–1959), 21st governor of Nebraska
- Richard McMullen (1868–1965), 59th governor of Delaware
