= 1924 Delaware gubernatorial election =

- November 4, 1924
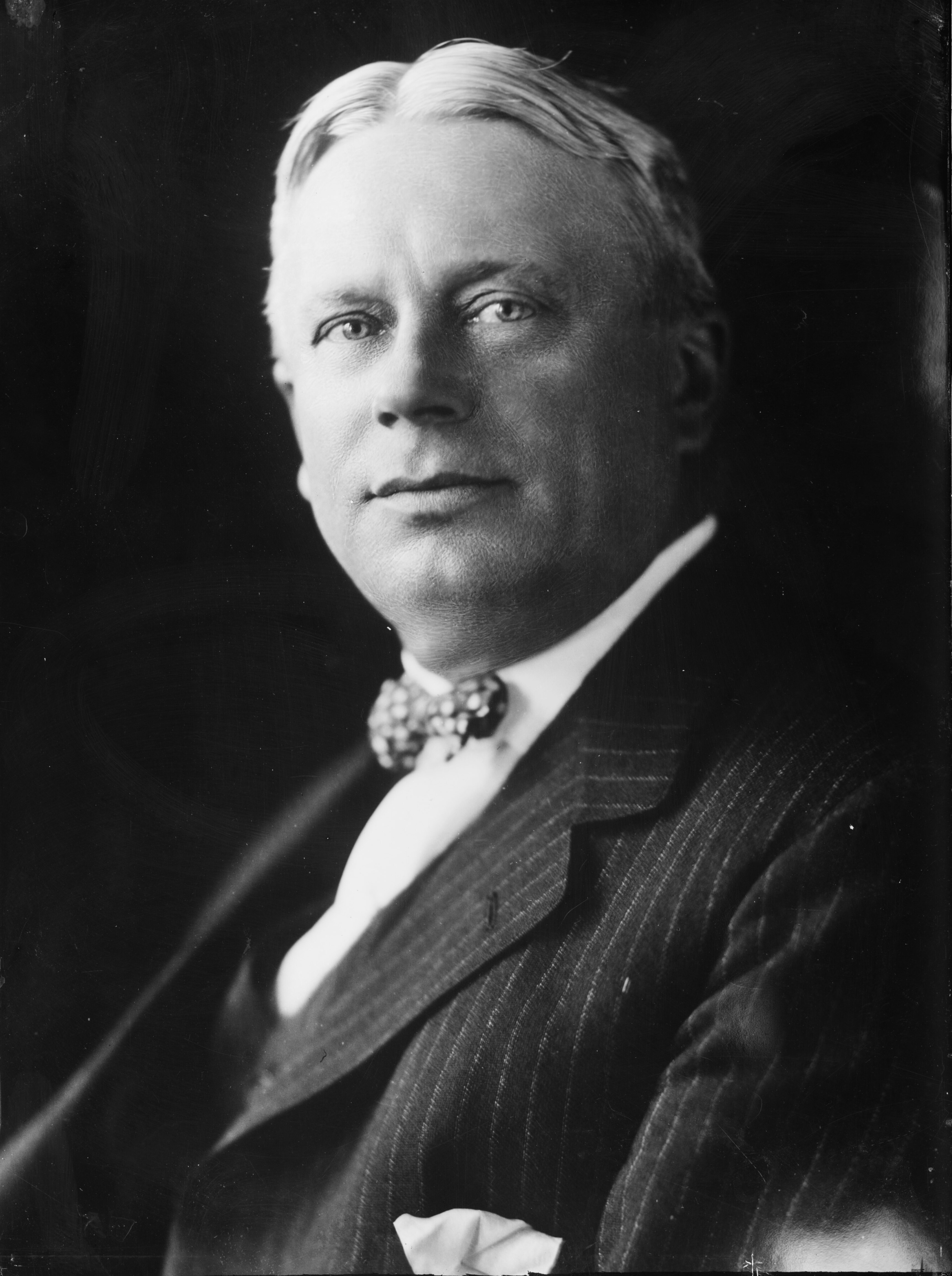

Nominee	Robert P. Robinson	Joseph Bancroft
Party	Republican	Democratic
Popular vote	52,236	35,640
Percentage	58.73%	40.07%
- County results Robinson: 50–60% 60–70% Bancroft: 50–60%
Governor before election
William D. Denney
Republican
Elected Governor
Robert P. Robinson
Republican

The 1924 Delaware gubernatorial election was held on November 4, 1924. Republican Governor William D. Denney declined to seek re-election, and the Republican state convention unanimously named banker Robert P. Robinson as its nominee; Robinson emerged as a compromise selection.

On the Democratic side, several candidates announced their candidacies prior to the convention and a difficult, protracted fight for the nomination developed. Joseph Bancroft, a prominent industrialist, and Josiah Marvel, emerged as the frontrunners. Bancroft won the nomination at the convention after nine ballots; an effort was made to nominate him by acclamation, but Marvel's supporters objected.

In the general election, Robinson defeated Bancroft by a wide margin, winning 59% of the vote to Bancroft's 40%. Robinson's landslide victory occurred as President Calvin Coolidge was overwhelmingly winning the state over his opponents, Democrat John W. Davis and Progressive Robert M. La Follette.

== General election ==
1924 Delaware gubernatorial election
Party	Candidate	Votes	%	±%
Republican	Robert P. Robinson	52,236	58.73%	+3.23%
Democratic	Joseph Bancroft	35,640	40.07%	−3.33%
Progressive Party (United States, 1924–34)	Kenneth A. Horner	641	0.72%	—
Forward Party	Frank A. Houck	422	0.47%	—
Majority		16,596	18.66%	+6.98%
Turnout		94,047	100.00%	
Republican hold				

== Bibliography ==
- Delaware House Journal, 100th General Assembly, 1st Reg. Sess. (1925).
