= Buena Vista (New Castle, Delaware) =

Historic house in Delaware, US

- U.S. National Register of Historic Places
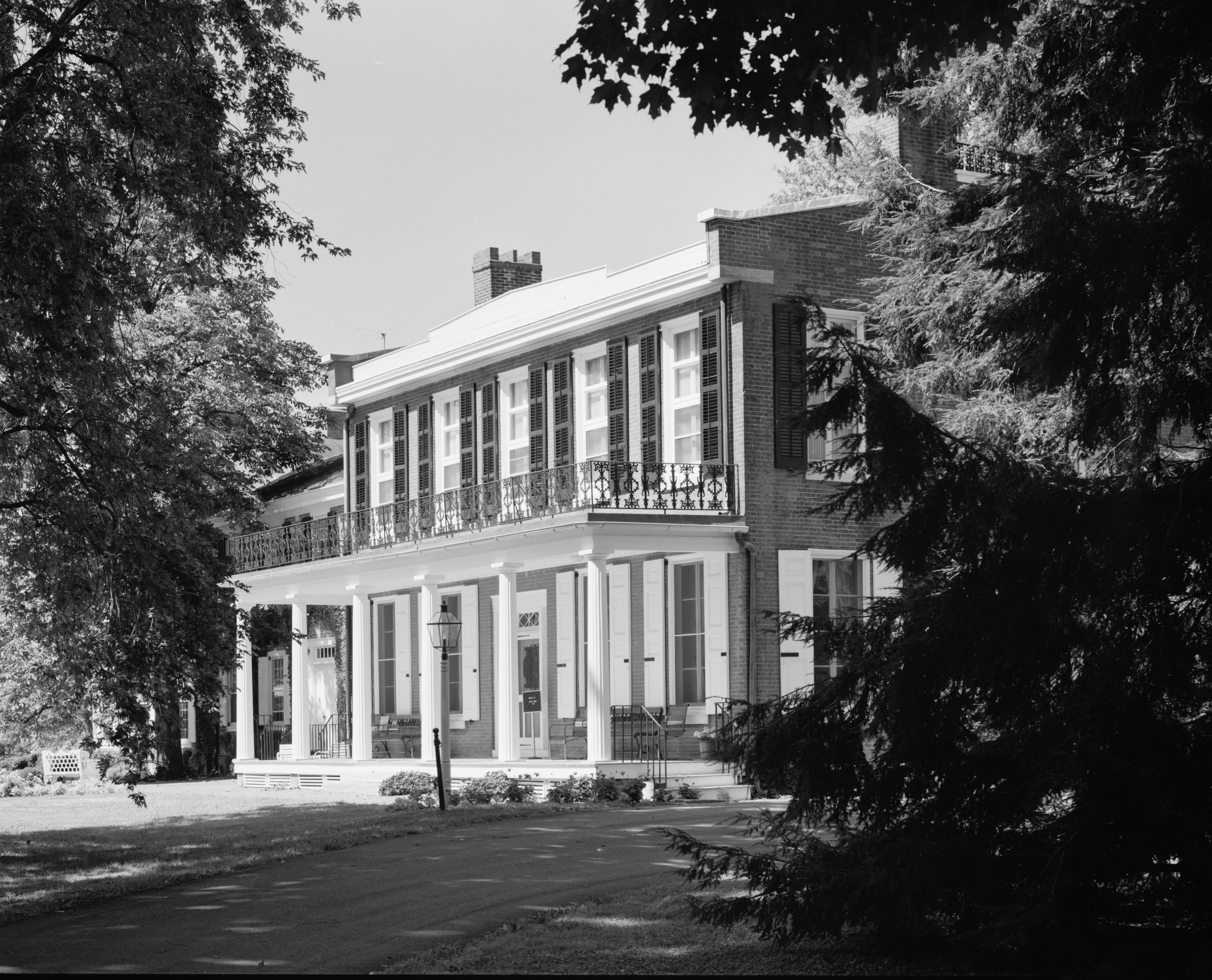
- Buena Vista, HABS Photo, June 1982

- Location within Delaware Location within the United States
- Location: 661 South DuPont Highway, New Castle, Delaware
- Coordinates: 39.633752°N 75.639539°W
- Area: 52 acres (21 ha)
- Built: 1845-1847
- Architect: Okie, R. Brognard
- Architectural style: Greek Revival
- NRHP reference No.: 71000228
- Added to NRHP: April 16, 1971

Buena Vista is a historic home located at New Castle, Delaware, United States. It was built between 1845 and 1847, and is a two-story, five-bay, brick dwelling in the Greek Revival style. It has a service wing and a long wing designed by architect R. Brognard Okie containing a long hall and library. It features a full-width verandah supported by Doric order columns. It was the home of U.S. Senator and Secretary of State John M. Clayton (1796–1856) and U.S. Senator and Delaware Governor C. Douglass Buck (1890–1965), who donated it to the State of Delaware. It is operated as the Buena Vista Conference Center by the State of Delaware.

The estate originally was named in commemoration of the Battle of Buena Vista in the Mexican–American War. It was added to the National Register of Historic Places in 1971.
