= 1932 Delaware gubernatorial election =

- November 8, 1932
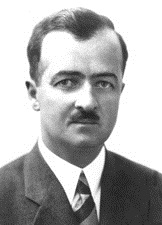

Nominee	C. Douglass Buck	Landreth L. Layton
Party	Republican	Democratic
Popular vote	60,903	50,401
Percentage	54.23%	44.88%
- County results Buck: 60–70% Layton: 50–60%
Governor before election
C. Douglass Buck
Republican
Elected Governor
C. Douglass Buck
Republican

The 1932 Delaware gubernatorial election was held on November 8, 1932. Incumbent Republican Governor C. Douglass Buck ran for re-election to a second term. He unanimously won renomination at the Republican state convention. In the general election, Buck faced the Democratic nominee, Landreth L. Layton, the scion of a prominent family in Delaware politics. Despite the nationwide Democratic landslide, Republicans performed well in Delaware; Herbert Hoover narrowly won Delaware over Franklin D. Roosevelt. Accordingly, Buck was able to win re-election, and significantly outpaced Hoover's slim margin; he received 54% of the vote to Layton's 45%.

== General election ==
1932 Delaware gubernatorial election
Party	Candidate	Votes	%	±%
Republican	C. Douglass Buck (inc.)	60,903	54.23%	−6.33%
Democratic	Landreth L. Layton	50,401	44.88%	+5.43%
Socialist	Fred W. Whiteside	889	0.79%	—
Communist	Harold Thomas	121	0.11%	—
Majority		10,502	9.35%	−11.77%
Turnout		112,314	100.00%	
Republican hold				

== Bibliography ==
- Delaware House Journal, 104th General Assembly, 1st Reg. Sess. (1933).
