= 1940 Delaware gubernatorial election =

- November 5, 1940

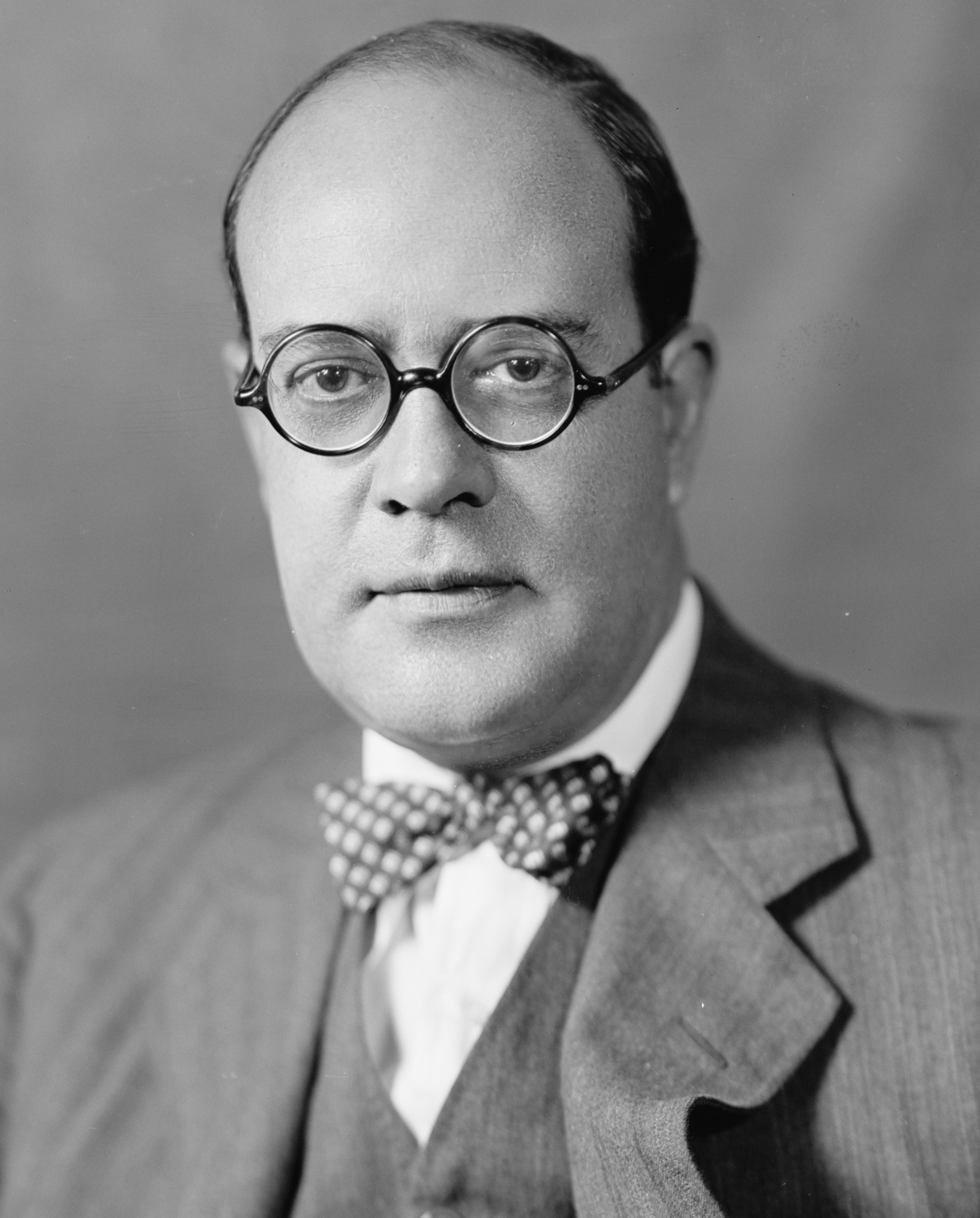
Nominee	Walter W. Bacon	Josiah Marvel Jr.
Party	Republican	Democratic
Popular vote	70,629	61,237
Percentage	52.39%	45.42%
- County results Bacon: 40–50% 50–60%
Governor before election
Richard McMullen
Democratic
Elected Governor
Walter W. Bacon
Republican

The 1940 Delaware gubernatorial election was held on November 5, 1940. Incumbent Democratic Governor Richard McMullen originally ran for re-election to a second term, and was renominated by the Democratic Party. However, less than a month before the election, McMullen suffered a heart attack and he dropped out of the race. The state party named Secretary of State Josiah Marvel Jr., as McMullen's replacement on the ballot. On the Republican side, Wilmington Mayor Walter W. Bacon was nominated by the Republican Party for Governor.

Ultimately, even as President Franklin D. Roosevelt was handily winning Delaware en route to re-election nationwide, and as Democrat James M. Tunnell was narrowly elected to the Senate, Bacon defeated Marvel by a decisive margin to regain the governorship for the Republican Party. Bacon received 52% of the vote to Marvel's 45%.

== General election ==
1940 Delaware gubernatorial election
Party	Candidate	Votes	%	±%
Republican	Walter W. Bacon	70,629	52.39%	+9.82%
Democratic	Josiah Marvel Jr.	61,237	45.42%	−4.94%
Liberal Democratic	Ivan Culbertson	2,958	2.19%	—
Majority		9,392	6.97%	−0.82%
Turnout		134,824	100.00%	
Republican gain from Democratic				
