= Richard Gilpin Buckingham =

American politician (1841–1939)

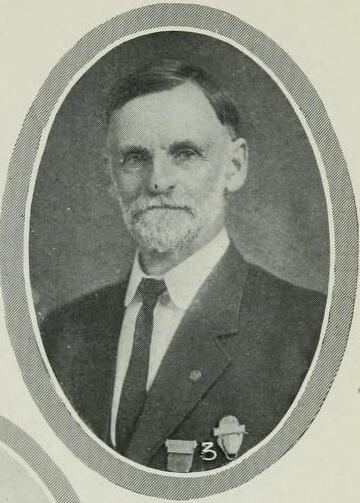
- Buckingham in a 1914 publication

Member of the Delaware House of Representatives
- In office 1910–1912, 1916–1918, 1920–1922

Personal details
- Born: August 1, 1841 Mill Creek, Delaware, U.S.
- Died: March 11, 1939 (aged 97) near Corner Ketch, Delaware, U.S.
- Resting place: Mill Creek Friends Burial Ground
- Party: Republican
- Spouse(s): Sarah A. Mote (m. 1865) Adalaide Cranston (m. 1884; died 1914)
- Children: 3, including Delsworth
- Occupation: Politician; farmer
- Military career
- Branch: Union Army
- Service years: 1862–1865
- Rank: Sergeant major
- Unit: 4th Delaware Infantry Regiment
- Conflicts: American Civil War; Battle of White Oak Swamp; Third Battle of Petersburg (WIA)

Richard Gilpin Buckingham (August 1, 1841 – March 11, 1939) was an American politician and farmer from Delaware. He served in the Delaware House of Representatives from 1910 to 1912, 1916 to 1918, and 1920 to 1922.

== Early life ==
Richard Gilpin Buckingham was born on August 1, 1841, in Pleasant Hill, upper Mill Creek, Delaware, to Mary E. and Alban Buckingham. His father was a farmer. He went by the nickname "Dick".

== Career ==
In August 1862, Buckingham enlisted in the 4th Delaware Infantry Regiment, Company E. He attained the rank of sergeant major and served until May 1865. He served at the Battle of White Oak Swamp and was wounded in the leg at the Third Battle of Petersburg.

Buckingham was a Republican. He was a member of the republican committee of New Castle County for over twenty years and from 1889 to 1904 served as its vice president. In 1890, he was elected as president (commissioner) of the Levy Court. The Republican majority court was disbanded by the five commissioners bill in 1893. According to The Morning News in 1904, under his two years of leadership of the court, the court paid off US$120,000 in its debts.

In 1904, Buckingham ran for the Delaware House of Representatives to succeed incumbent William M. Eastburn. He served three terms in the state house, from 1910 to 1912, 1916 to 1918, and 1920 to 1922. He was a member of a commission that added the Stanley M. Arthurs painting showing the surrender of Robert E. Lee to the House chamber of the Old State House in Dover.

Buckingham was a school commissioner. He was a member of the Newark post of the Grand Army of the Republic (G.A.R.) before it disbanded. He was also a member of the Reynolds Post of the G.A.R. in Pleasant Hill. He was commander of the Delaware G.A.R. He was a director of the Newport National Bank. He was also a farmer and was a member of The Grange. He was a charter member and founder of the Union Grange, No. 1.

== Personal life ==
Buckingham married Sarah A. Mote on November 16, 1865. They had two sons and one daughter, R. Gilpin Jr., Delsworth M., and Mary M. He married Adalaide (or Adaline) Cranston on March 14, 1884. They had no children. She died in 1916. He was a member of the Society of Friends at Mill Creek.

Buckingham died of a heart attack on March 11, 1939, at his home near Corner Ketch. He was buried at Mill Creek Friends Burial Ground.
