= Josiah Marvel Jr. =

American diplomat (1904–1955)

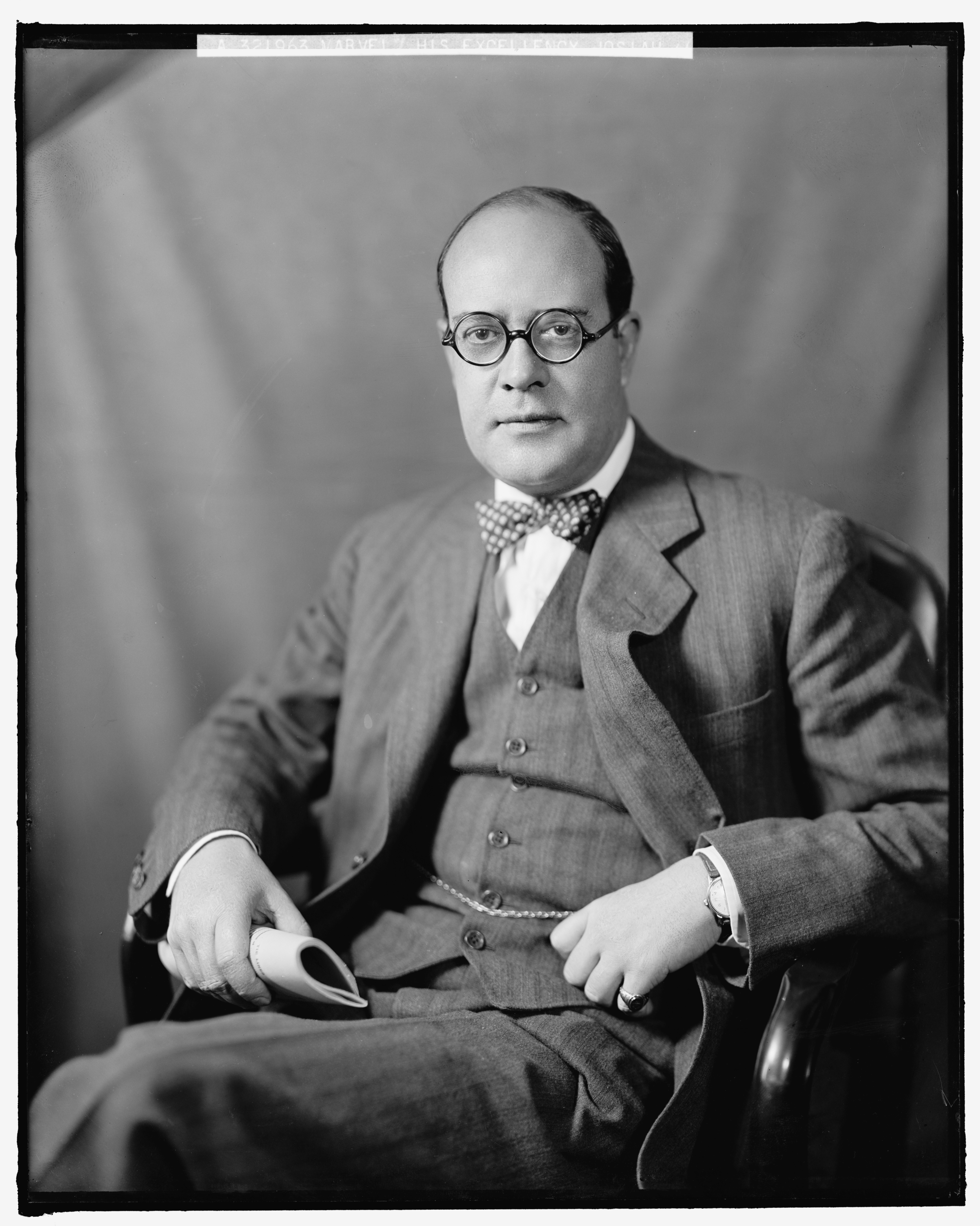

chief of the United States' diplomatic mission in Denmark
- In office 1946–1949

Secretary of State for Delaware
- In office 1938–1941

Personal details
- Born: November 26, 1904
- Died: December 1955 (aged 51) Wilmington, Delaware
- Spouse: Gwladys Crosby Hopkins (after 1943)
- Children: 2
- Occupation: Lawyer, diplomat, politician, soldier

Josiah Marvel Jr. was an American diplomat who served as chief of the United States' diplomatic mission in Denmark from 1946 to 1949, originally at the rank of Envoy Extraordinary and later as Ambassador Extraordinary and Minister Plenipotentiary. He was appointed by President Harry S. Truman.

== Biography ==
Marvel was born on November 26, 1904 in Wilmington, Delaware. He was the son of Josiah Marvel, a president of the American Bar Association and Mary B Jackson. He was one of eight children.

Marvel graduated from Harvard Law School and was a lawyer, politician, and soldier. Marvel enlisted in the United States Army in September 1942 and was promoted to the rank of Captain in June 1944 after serving in the Aviation Intelligence Office in Washington DC. During World War II he served with the United States Army Air Forces.

Marvel served as Delaware Secretary of State from 1938 to 1941. He ran for Governor of Delaware in 1940 as a Democrat, losing the election to Republican Walter W. Bacon. It was announced in February 1943 that he and Gladys Hopkins Whitney were to be married, Whitney had been previously married to Cornelius Vanderbilt Whitney, and had full custody of their daughter.

In 1946, President Truman appointed him as minister to Denmark, and he was promoted to ambassador in 1949. Marvel was appointed the chairman of the International Claims Commission in 1950 and served until 1953, when President Dwight Eisenhower removed him from the position.

Marvel died in December 1955 after being transported to a Wilmington hospital due to a long battle with cancer.

Party political offices
Preceded by Richard McMullen	Democratic nominee for Governor of Delaware; 1940	Succeeded by Isaac J. MacCollum
