= 1944 Delaware gubernatorial election =

- November 7, 1944

Nominee	Walter W. Bacon	Isaac J. MacCollum
Party	Republican	Democratic
Popular vote	63,829	62,156
Percentage	50.52%	49.19%
- County results Bacon: 40–50% 50–60%
Governor before election
Walter W. Bacon
Republican
Elected Governor
Walter W. Bacon
Republican

The 1944 Delaware gubernatorial election was held on November 7, 1944.

Incumbent Republican Governor Walter W. Bacon defeated Democratic nominee Isaac J. MacCollum with 50.52% of the vote.

== Nominations ==
Nominations were made by party conventions.

=== Democratic nomination ===
The Democratic convention was held on August 22 at Dover.

==== Candidate ====
- Isaac J. MacCollum, incumbent Lieutenant Governor

=== Republican nomination ===
The Republican convention was held on July 19 at Dover.

==== Candidate ====
- Walter W. Bacon, incumbent Governor, nominated unopposed

== General election ==
1944 Delaware gubernatorial election
Party	Candidate	Votes	%	±%
Republican	Walter W. Bacon (incumbent)	63,829	50.52%	
Democratic	Isaac J. MacCollum	62,156	49.19%	
Prohibition	Thomas W. Jakes	370	0.29%	
Majority		1,673	1.33%	
Turnout		126,355	100.00%	
Republican hold		Swing		

== Bibliography ==
- Gubernatorial Elections, 1787-1997. Washington, D.C.: Congressional Quarterly Inc. 1998. ISBN 1-56802-396-0.
- Glashan, Roy R. (1979). American Governors and Gubernatorial Elections, 1775-1978. Meckler Books. ISBN 0-930466-17-9.
