= Delsworth Buckingham =

American politician (1866–1951)

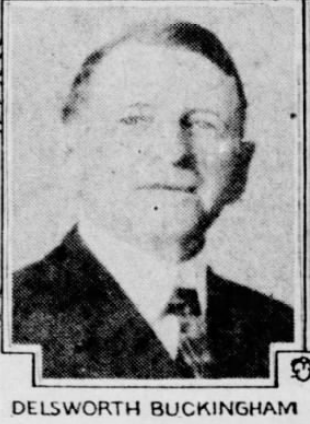

Member of the Delaware House of Representatives from the 8th New Castle County district
- In office January 4, 1927 – January 8, 1929
- Preceded by: Irvin G. Klair
- Succeeded by: William F. Seal

Personal details
- Born: August 22, 1866 Hockessin, Delaware, U.S.
- Died: October 14, 1951 (aged 85) Delaware, U.S.
- Party: Republican
- Parent: Richard Gilpin Buckingham (father)
- Occupation: Politician

Delsworth Mote Buckingham (August 22, 1866 – October 14, 1951) was an American politician. He served one term in the Delaware House of Representatives from 1927 to 1929 during the 104th Delaware General Assembly.

== Biography ==
Buckingham was born in Hockessin, Delaware, on August 22, 1866, as one of three children born to Sarah (Mote) and Richard Gilpin Buckingham. Few details are known about his early life, except that he worked as a paperhanger and painter. In September 1896, Buckingham married his first wife, Etta Stone, but they separated shortly afterwards. Within four years of his marriage with Stone, Buckingham had remarried to Minnie Ament. They later divorced and Buckingham married Adeline Klair, whom he remained married to until his death.

Buckingham was an active member of several fraternal groups, being first elected assistant secretary of the Newark Lodge at the age of 19. He later served positions in the Independent Order of Red Men, the Odd Fellows, the Armstrong Lodge of Free and Accepted Masons, and the Loyal Order of Moose. Buckingham was a devout Presbyterian and served as a parishioner at the Red Clay Creek Presbyterian Church for about 30 years, in addition to managing a local Sunday school.

Buckingham ran for the Delaware House of Representatives in 1926, winning one of the New Castle County seats despite having no prior political experience. He ran as a Republican and defeated his opponent, the Democrat Lewis Dickey, 879 votes to 506. He began his term in January 1927 and served as chairman of the committee of Charities and Public Health, while also being a member of the committees on Public Highways, Temperance, Elections, Education, and the Judiciary.

After his term expired, Buckingham continued to live in New Castle, and was reelected superintendent of the Sunday school at Red Clay Creek Presbyterian Church for the ninth straight year in 1934. Near the end of his life, Buckingham suffered from heart issues, and he died as a result of a heart attack at his home on October 14, 1951, aged 85.
