= 1920 Delaware gubernatorial election =

- November 2, 1920
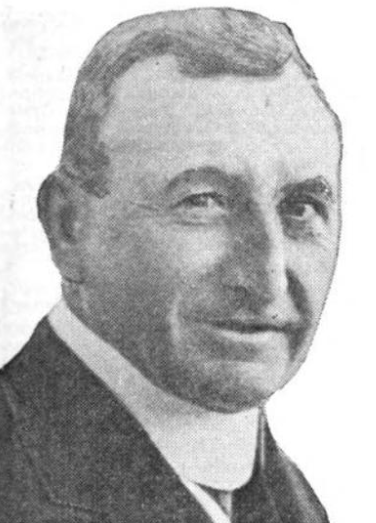

| Nominee | William D. Denney | Andrew J. Lynch |
| Party | Republican | Democratic |
| Popular vote | 52,200 | 40,823 |
| Percentage | 55.50% | 43.41% |
- County results Denney: 60–70% Lynch: 50–60%
Governor before election
John G. Townsend Jr.
Republican
Elected Governor
William D. Denney
Republican

The 1920 Delaware gubernatorial election was held on November 2, 1920. Incumbent Republican Governor John G. Townsend Jr. declined to seek re-election. At the Republican convention, former State Representative William D. Denney, the frontrunner for the nomination, received the Party's endorsement for Governor without difficulty—though some opposition to his candidacy arose before the convention.

The Democratic contest was more lively, with several prospective candidates in the mix. Attorney Andrew J. Lynch received the endorsement of the Sussex County delegation over Willard F. Deputy, a lumber merchant. At the convention, Lynch was nominated unanimously.

In the general election, Denney ended up defeating Lynch by a wide margin, largely mirroring the margin in the presidential election, winning 56% of the vote to Lynch's 43%.

== General election ==
1920 Delaware gubernatorial election
| Party | Candidate | Votes | % | ±% |
|---|---|---|---|---|
| Republican | William D. Denney | 52,200 | 55.50% | +3.42% |
| Democratic | Andrew J. Lynch | 40,823 | 43.41% | −3.56% |
| Socialist | William H. Conner | 1,024 | 1.09% | +0.13% |
| Majority | | 11,377 | 12.10% | +6.98% |
| Turnout | | 94,047 | 100.00% | |
| Republican hold | | | | |

== Bibliography ==
- Delaware House Journal, 98th General Assembly, 1st Reg. Sess. (1921).
