= 100th Delaware General Assembly =

American legislative session

←	99th	101st	→

Overview
- Legislative body: Delaware General Assembly
- Term: January 7, 1919 – January 4, 1921

The 100th Delaware General Assembly was a meeting of the legislative branch of the state government, consisting of the Delaware Senate and the Delaware House of Representatives. Elections were held the first Tuesday after November 1 and terms began in Dover on the first Tuesday in January. This date was January 7, 1919, which was two weeks before the beginning of the third administrative year of Governor John G. Townsend Jr. and Colen Ferguson as Lieutenant Governor.

Currently the distribution of the Senate Assembly seats was made to seven senators for New Castle County and for five senators to each Kent and Sussex counties. Likewise the current distribution of the House Assembly seats was made to fifteen representatives for New Castle County and for ten representatives each to Kent and Sussex counties. The actual population changes of the county did not directly affect the number of senators or representatives at this time.

In the 100th Delaware General Assembly session both chambers had a Republican majority.

== Leadership ==
=== Senate ===
- Isaac D. Short, Kent County, Republican

=== House of Representatives ===
- Alexander P. Corbit, New Castle County, Republican

== Members ==
=== Senate ===
About half of the State Senators were elected every two years for a four-year term. They were from a district in a specific county, with the number of districts determined by the state constitution, not the size of the population.

New Castle County

- 1. James W. Robertson
- 2. Thomas F. Gormley
- 3. George W. Webster
- 4. John M. Walker
- 5. John F. Richards
- 6. Frank R. Pool
- 7. John E. Latta

Kent County

- 1. Lewis M. Price
- 2. Robert H. Hollett
- 3. James F. Allee Jr.
- 4. Charles D. Murphy
- 5. Wallace S. Handy

Sussex County

- 1. Isaac D. Short
- 2. Edward B. Brown
- 3. Asa Bennett
- 4. Ira L. Long
- 5. James C. Palmer

=== House of Representatives ===
All the State Representatives were elected every two years for a two-year term. They were from a district in a specific county, with the number of districts determined by the state constitution, not the size of the population.

New Castle County

- 1. Andrew L. Mulrine
- 2. William Lyons Jr.
- 3. Theodore W. Francis
- 4. John E. McNabb
- 5. John J. Mulvena
- 6. William H. Danzenbaker
- 7. William S. Gregg
- 8. Aaron F. Klair
- 9. William D. Dean
- 10. Joseph J. Quigley
- 11. William C. Brooks
- 12. Edward Lester Jr.
- 13. Alexander P. Corbit
- 14. Walter E. Hart
- 15. Jefferson A. Staats

Kent County

- 1. Thomas J. Snow
- 2. Garrett D. Paradee
- 3. Charles Hanratty
- 4. John W. Smith
- 5. John T. Buckson
- 6. James M. Sherwood
- 7. William H. Jakes
- 8. Jacob L. Soper
- 9. James C. Hardesty
- 10. Clarence E. Jester

Sussex County

- 1. Henry E. Clendaniel
- 2. Charles W. Parker
- 3. Joseph B. Lord
- 4. James E. Lloyd
- 5. Harvey W. Hastings
- 6. Benjamin F. Jones
- 7. Elijah W. Bunting
- 8. John D. Warrington
- 9. Hiram S. Smith
- 10. Silas J. Warrington

== Places with more information ==
- Delaware Historical Society; website; 505 North Market Street, Wilmington, Delaware 19801; (302) 655-7161.
- University of Delaware; Library website; 181 South College Avenue, Newark, Delaware 19717; (302) 831-2965.
