= Lewis E. Eliason =

American politician (1850–1919)

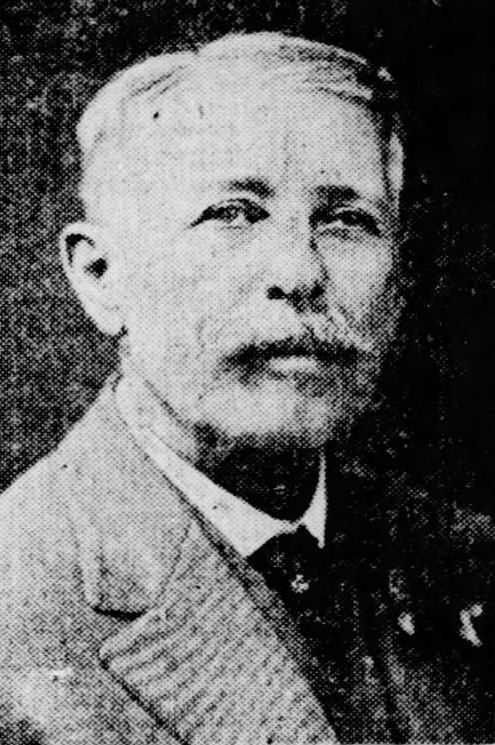

Lieutenant Governor of Delaware
- In office January 16, 1917 – May 2, 1919
- Governor: John G. Townsend Jr.

Personal details
- Born: September 15, 1850
- Died: May 2, 1919 (aged 68)
- Party: Democratic
- Occupation: Businessman, politician

Lewis E. Eliason (September 15, 1850 – May 2, 1919) was an American politician who was the fifth lieutenant governor of Delaware, from January 16, 1917, until his death on May 2, 1919. A Democrat, he served under Republican governor John G. Townsend Jr., as the two offices were elected independently at the time.

He was the state's only lieutenant governor to die in office.

Political offices
Preceded by Colen Ferguson	Lieutenant Governor of Delaware; 1917–1919	Succeeded by J. Danforth Bush
