= Mill Creek, Delaware =

Unincorporated community in Delaware, United States

- Unincorporated community
- Location within Delaware Location within the United States
- Coordinates: 39°47′05″N 75°42′18″W
- Country: United States
- State: Delaware
- County: New Castle
- Elevation: 259 ft (79 m)
- Time zone: UTC-5 (Eastern (EST))
  - Summer (DST): UTC-4 (EDT)
- Area code: 302
- GNIS feature ID: 216155

Mill Creek is an unincorporated community in New Castle County, Delaware, United States. Mill Creek is located along Valley Road, southwest of Hockessin.
