= Luther S. Conwell =

Delaware politician and physician

Luther S. Conwell (c. 1860 – c. February 5, 1934) was a physician and a member of the Delaware House of Representatives. He was born and spent most of his life in Camden, Delaware. He graduated from Jefferson Medical College in Philadelphia in 1884, and practiced medicine in Delaware. He was for some time secretary and executive officer of the Delaware State Board of Health. He was a Republican member of the Delaware State House.

He was found dead at his home in Camden on February 5, 1934, having been ill for a fortnight.
