= Corner Ketch, Delaware =

Unincorporated community in Delaware, United States

- Unincorporated community
- Location within Delaware Location within the United States
- Coordinates: 39°44′57″N 75°44′28″W
- Country: United States
- State: Delaware
- County: New Castle
- Elevation: 328 ft (100 m)
- Time zone: UTC-5 (Eastern (EST))
  - Summer (DST): UTC-4 (EDT)
- Area code: 302
- GNIS feature ID: 216072

Corner Ketch is an unincorporated community in New Castle County, Delaware, United States. Corner Ketch is located at the intersection of Corner Ketch Road and Doe Run Road, north of Newark.

The origin of the name "Corner Ketch" is obscure. According to tradition, travelers were cautioned to be careful at the dangerous crossroad: "Watch out! They'll catch ye at the corners".
