= James H. Anderson (politician) =

American politician (1878–1936)

James Hall Anderson

7th Lieutenant Governor of Delaware
- In office January 20, 1925 – January 15, 1929
- Governor: Robert P. Robinson
- Preceded by: J. Danforth Bush
- Succeeded by: James H. Hazel

Personal details
- Born: November 12, 1878
- Died: December 21, 1936 (aged 58)
- Occupation: Politician

James Hall Anderson (November 12, 1878 – December 21, 1936) was an American politician who served as the seventh Lieutenant Governor of Delaware, from January 20, 1925, to January 15, 1929, under Governor Robert P. Robinson.

Political offices
Preceded by J. Danforth Bush	Lieutenant Governor of Delaware; 1925–1929	Succeeded by James H. Hazel
