= Isaac J. MacCollum =

American politician (1889–1968)

11th Lieutenant Governor of Delaware
- In office January 21, 1941 – January 16, 1945
- Governor: Walter W. Bacon
- Preceded by: Edward W. Cooch
- Succeeded by: Elbert N. Carvel

Personal details
- Born: August 18, 1889 Fenwick Island, Delaware
- Died: March 4, 1968 (aged 78) Wyoming, Delaware
- Party: Democratic Party
- Education: West Chester University
- Profession: Physician

Isaac James MacCollum (August 18, 1889 – March 4, 1968) was an American physician and politician from Wyoming, in Kent County, Delaware. He was a member of the Democratic Party, and served as the 11th Lieutenant Governor of Delaware.

== Early life and family ==
MacCollum was born at Fenwick Island, Delaware. He graduated from West Chester Normal School, now known as West Chester University, in 1910 and Jefferson Medical College in Philadelphia in 1914.

== Professional and political career ==
MacCollum served on the medical advisory board during World War I and was president of the Delaware State Medical Society in 1930. He served as a member of the trustees at Delaware State Hospital for nine years, president of the State Board of Health for four years, and a member of the State Parole Board for 20 years, 16 of those years as president.

He was elected Lieutenant Governor of Delaware in 1940, defeating Republican candidate Earle D. Willey of Dover, who was a Judge of the Court of Common Pleas. He served from January 21, 1941, until January 19, 1945, alongside Republican Governor Walter W. Bacon. In 1944 he ran for Governor against Bacon, but was defeated and returned to his medical practice full-time.

== Death and legacy ==
MacCallum died in Wyoming, Delaware. He was a respected country doctor, described as "mainly just a kind, traditional doctor. He made house calls, which is something you don't see today. I am grateful to him -- he delivered my first baby."

== Almanac ==
Elections are held the first Tuesday after November 1. U.S. Representatives take office January 3 and have a term of two years.

	Public offices				
Office	Type	Location	Began office	Ended office	Notes
Lt. Governor	Executive	Dover	January 21, 1941	January 19, 1945	

Election results
Year	Office	Subject	Party	Votes	%	Opponent	Party	Votes	%
1940	Lt. Governor	Isaac J. MacCollum	Democratic			Earle D. Willey	Republican		
1944	Governor	Isaac J. MacCollum	Democratic	62,156	49%	Walter W. Bacon	Republican	63,829	51%

== Places with more information ==
- Delaware Historical Society; website; 505 North Market Street, Wilmington, Delaware 19801; (302) 655-7161.
- University of Delaware; Library website; 181 South College Avenue, Newark, Delaware 19717; (302) 831-2965.

Political offices
Preceded by Edward W. Cooch	Lieutenant Governor of Delaware; 1941–1945	Succeeded by Elbert N. Carvel
Party political offices
Preceded by Josiah Marvel Jr.	Democratic nominee for Governor of Delaware; 1944	Succeeded by Elbert N. Carvel
