= Robert P. Robinson (Delaware politician) =

American politician (1869–1939)

The Honorable Robert P. Robinson
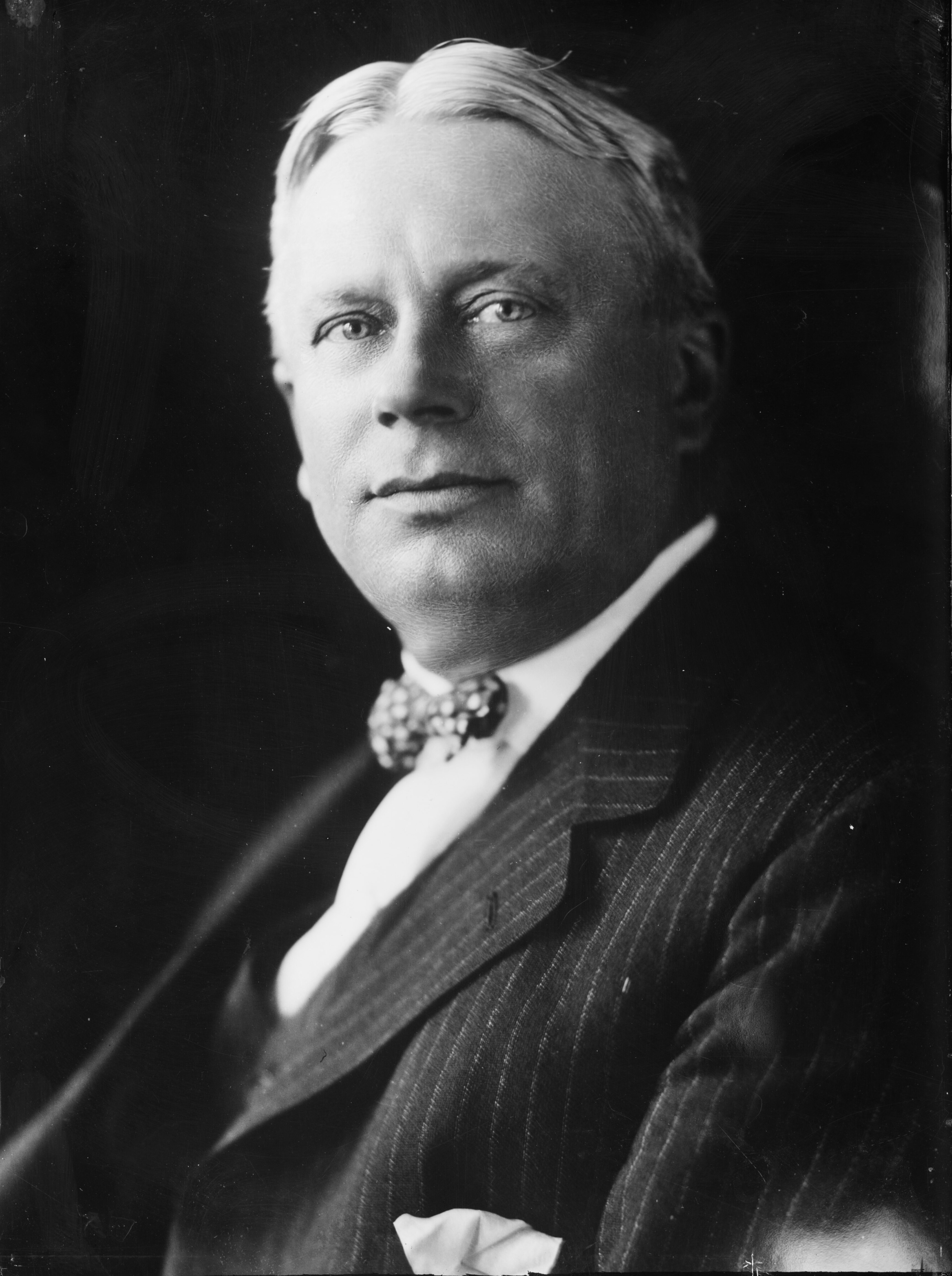

57th Governor of Delaware
- In office January 20, 1925 – January 15, 1929
- Lieutenant: James H. Anderson
- Preceded by: William D. Denney
- Succeeded by: C. Douglass Buck

Personal details
- Born: March 28, 1869 Wilmington, Delaware, U.S.
- Died: March 4, 1939 (aged 69) Wilmington, Delaware, U.S.
- Party: Republican
- Spouse: Margaret Fouraker
- Occupation: Banker

Robert Pyle Robinson (March 28, 1869 – March 4, 1939) was an American banker and politician from Wilmington, Delaware. A member of the Republican Party, he served as the 57th Governor of Delaware.

== Early life and family ==
Robinson was born at "Robinhurst," now Alban Park, in Wilmington, Delaware, son of Robert L. and Frances Delaplaine Robinson. He married Margaret Fouraker in 1905 and they had three children, Mary Frances, Robert Jr. and Frances Robinson Parsons. They were members of the Hanover Presbyterian Church in Wilmington.

== Professional and politics career ==
Robinson began his career with the Central National Bank, becoming the president of the bank in 1916. He first was exposed to politics when he worked as personal secretary to Delaware U.S. Representative L. Heisler Ball from 1902 until 1903. In 1914 he lost the close contest for Delaware's Insurance Commissioner by only 98 votes. Ten years later, in 1924, he was a compromise choice to be the Republican candidate for Governor of Delaware and was elected, defeating Joseph Bancroft, the Democratic Party candidate.

== Governor of Delaware ==
During his tenure, the major issues facing state government were related to secondary education and highway construction. With the passage of the controversial School Codes of 1919 and 1921 Delaware was committed to an aggressive program of school construction. Pierre S. du Pont had agreed to get the process started and provided the massive financial support from his own funds. However, that could not continue forever and yet the General Assembly refused to levy additional taxes. The new income tax and corporate franchise tax were capable of producing the revenue needed, but it was suspected everyone was not filing as they should have been. To remedy the situation Robinson appointed du Pont himself to be the State Tax Commissioner. Du Pont quickly modernized the office, increased the revenue from the income tax and assured the continuation of the school building program.

Robinson was also a proponent of the organization of the State Board of Charities and he supported a modernized pension system for needy mothers. It was increasingly clear that reform was needed in what is now known as the social services and legislation was introduced to replace the county "almshouses" with a state welfare home. The bill failed to pass, but Florence M. Hanby, who was the first woman elected to the General Assembly, introduced the "Hope Farm Bill" into this session, and it provided funding for the Anti-Tuberculosis Hospital at Hope Farm. Robinson also appointed the first female state Secretary of State in the United States, Fannie Harrington.

Delaware General Assembly (sessions while governor)
| Year | Assembly | Senate Majority | President pro tempore | House Majority | Speaker |
|---|---|---|---|---|---|
| 1925-1926 | 103rd | Democratic | William C. Truitt | Republican | Henry C. Downward |
| 1927-1928 | 104th | Democratic | William F. Allen | Republican | William Wintrup |

== Death and legacy ==
Following his term as governor, Robinson returned to the presidency of the Central National bank in Wilmington. He died at Wilmington and is buried there in the Wilmington and Brandywine Cemetery.

Although never a farmer, in 1922 he became Master (President) of the State Grange and served as Treasurer of the National Grange. The 3-F's were the way he described his favorite activities: family, farming, and fishing. He was known to disappear from his desk in favor of a local pond. "Competent and diligent, he displayed a certain boyishness and shyness all his life."

== Almanac ==
Elections are held the first Tuesday after November 1. The governor takes office the third Tuesday of January and has a four-year term.

Public Offices
| Office | Type | Location | Began office | Ended office | notes |
|---|---|---|---|---|---|
| Governor | Executive | Dover | January 20, 1925 | January 15, 1929 | |

Election results
| Year | Office | Subject | Party | Votes | % | Opponent | Party | Votes | % |
|---|---|---|---|---|---|---|---|---|---|
| 1924 | Governor | Robert P. Robinson | Republican | 53,046 | 60% | Joseph Bancroft | Democratic | 34,830 | 39% |

== Images ==
- Hall of Governors Portrait Gallery , Portrait courtesy of Historical and Cultural Affairs, Dover.

Party political offices
| Preceded by William D. Denney | Republican nominee for Governor of Delaware; 1924 | Succeeded by C. Douglass Buck |
Political offices
| Preceded by William D. Denney | Governor of Delaware; 1925–1929 | Succeeded by C. Douglass Buck |
