= J. Danforth Bush =

American politician (1868–1926)

Joshua Danforth Bush

6th Lieutenant Governor of Delaware
- In office January 18, 1921 – January 20, 1925
- Governor: William D. Denney
- Preceded by: Lewis E. Eliason
- Succeeded by: James H. Anderson

Personal details
- Born: December 4, 1868
- Died: December 4, 1926 (aged 58)
- Party: Republican
- Parent: George W. Bush

Joshua Danforth Bush (December 4, 1868 – December 4, 1926) was an American businessman and Republican Party politician who served as the sixth Lieutenant Governor of Delaware, from January 18, 1921, to January 20, 1925, under Governor William D. Denney. He resided in Wilmington, Delaware.

Bush was also a wealthy businessman, as a member of one of Delaware's more prominent families. His father, George W. Bush, had inherited the family shipping business from his own father and had expanded it to include a large business in anthracite, coal, and even yellow pine lumber. The company, George W. Bush & Sons, eventually passed the lumber business to J. Danforth Bush's firm, a partnership with Robert B. Rayner. Bush also took on a large role in his father's company. After George W. Bush died in 1900, his sons incorporated their coal and transportation business as the George W. Bush & Sons Company. J. Danforth Bush was made vice president of the company.

Bush was a prominent member of the Delaware Game Protective Association, at one time serving as that organization's vice president for New Castle County. He also served as treasurer and secretary at various times.

Political offices
| Preceded by Lewis E. Eliason | Lieutenant Governor of Delaware; 1921–1925 | Succeeded by James H. Anderson |
