= Roy F. Corley =

American politician (1874–1953)

9th Lieutenant Governor of Delaware
- In office January 17, 1933 – January 19, 1937
- Governor: C. Douglass Buck
- Preceded by: James H. Hazel
- Succeeded by: Edward W. Cooch

Personal details
- Born: November 1, 1874
- Died: April 4, 1953 (aged 78)
- Party: Republican
- Occupation: Politician

Roy Franklin Corley (November 1, 1874 – April 4, 1953) was an American politician who served as the ninth Lieutenant Governor of Delaware, from January 17, 1933, to January 19, 1937, under Governor C. Douglass Buck. He was a member of the Republican Party. As Lieutenant Governor he presided over the Delaware Senate.

Political offices
Preceded by James H. Hazel	Lieutenant Governor of Delaware; 1933–1937	Succeeded by Edward W. Cooch
