= James H. Hazel =

American politician (1888–1965)

J. Henry Hazel

8th Lieutenant Governor of Delaware
- In office January 15, 1929 – January 17, 1933
- Governor: C. Douglass Buck
- Preceded by: James H. Anderson
- Succeeded by: Roy F. Corley

Personal details
- Born: James Henry Hazel; July 21, 1888 Dover, Delaware, U.S.
- Died: January 1965 (aged 76) Delaware, U.S.
- Party: Republican

James Henry Hazel (July 21, 1888 – January 1965) was an American politician who served as the eighth Lieutenant Governor of Delaware, from January 15, 1929, to January 17, 1933, under Governor C. Douglass Buck.

Political offices
Preceded by James H. Anderson	Lieutenant Governor of Delaware; 1929–1933	Succeeded by Roy F. Corley
