= William D. Denney =

American politician (1873–1953)

The Honorable William D. Denney
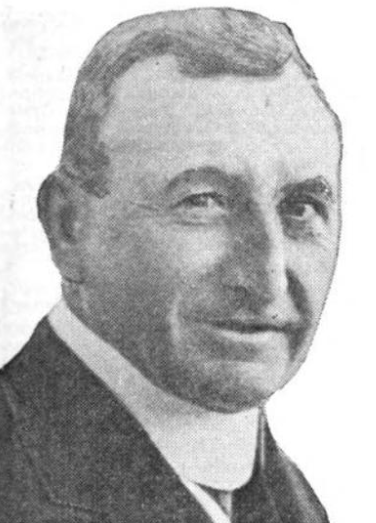

56th Governor of Delaware
- In office January 18, 1921 – January 20, 1925
- Lieutenant: J. Danforth Bush
- Preceded by: John G. Townsend Jr.
- Succeeded by: Robert P. Robinson

Member of the Delaware House of Representatives
- In office January 10, 1905 - January 8, 1907

Personal details
- Born: William duHamel Denney; March 31, 1873 Dover, Delaware, U.S.
- Died: November 21, 1953 (aged 80) Elsmere, Delaware, U.S.
- Resting place: Christ Episcopal Church Cemetery; Dover, Delaware
- Party: Republican
- Spouse: Alice Godwin (1888–1980)
- Education: Wesleyan Collegiate Institute
- Occupation: Businessman

Military service
- Allegiance: United States of America
- Branch/service: United States Army
- Rank: First lieutenant

William duHamel Denney (March 31, 1873 – November 21, 1953) was an American businessman and politician from Dover, in Kent County, Delaware. He was a veteran of World War I and member of the Republican Party, who served in the Delaware General Assembly and as Governor of Delaware.

== Early life and family ==
Denney was born near Dover, Delaware, son of William and Anna DuHamel Denney. He married Alice Godwin on October 27, 1917, and they had two children, Alice and Anne. They lived at 201 Williams Street in Dover and were members of Christ Episcopal Church. Denney attended the Wesleyan Collegiate Institute in Dover.

== Professional and political career ==
He made his professional career in the insurance business, becoming the General Agent of the Hartford Insurance Company in 1908 and was a partner in the W. Charles Boyer's Dover Insurance Agency. During World War I he left his job and served in the U.S. Army. Rising to the rank of first lieutenant, he was ordered to go to France, but three times had the orders cancelled, and never went.

== Governor of Delaware ==
Denney served one term in the Delaware House of Representatives, during the 1905-06 session, and was chosen as Speaker. He was the personal secretary to Delaware U.S. Senator Harry A. Richardson from 1907 until 1913. In 1920 he was elected Governor of Delaware, defeating the Democratic Party candidate, Andrew J. Lynch, a Georgetown lawyer.

The 1921 session saw a renewed struggle over public education. In the previous session, the far reaching, innovative legislation known as the "School Code of 1919" was enacted. This act completely reworked public education in Delaware by empowering a state superintendent to set standards, consolidated hundreds of tiny local school districts into countywide districts, established a 180-day school year, and provided for a County board of education to appropriate funding through the county property tax. It was hotly debated then, and only narrowly passed. The opponents were poised to repeal the whole legislation in 1921, but through much effort, proponents managed a compromise, the "School Law of 1921". It lessened the standards, including the 180-day school year, but most importantly moved the funding from the counties to the state through an income tax. To manage that funding, it replaced the county boards of education with a State board of education and a State School Tax Commissioner. The whole effort was a personal mission of Pierre S. du Pont. He was prominent among those who persuasively argued its passage, not only in the General Assembly, but in hundreds of small gatherings around the state. And it was his personal $5,000,000 contribution, given over 20 years, which made possible much of the reconstruction of suitable buildings to meet the standards established.

Denney was at the center of controversy over a series of appointments that came to be known as "the Dirty Deal". In 1921 the term of respected Chancellor Charles M. Curtis was due to expire. Denney could easily have reappointed him, but instead chose to nominate Josiah O. Wolcott to the post. Wolcott was thought to want to be chancellor, but had the added advantage of being a Democratic U.S. Senator, whose appointment as chancellor would create the opportunity for Denney to appoint a Republican to the U.S. Senate. The scenario created weeks of clamor, with the Delaware Bar demanding the reappointment of Curtis and Wolcott saying he would refuse the appointment. Denney persisted though, and Wolcott was appointed, resigning his U.S. Senate seat. Then Denney dropped a bombshell by appointing his friend and Republican Party leader, T. Coleman du Pont, to the U.S. Senate seat. The press exploded, convinced that du Pont, one of the wealthiest men in the country, had bought the position for himself. Du Pont was eventually punished by being defeated in the U.S. Senate election of 1922, but Wolcott served a long and distinguished career as chancellor.

After leaving office, Denney served as acting secretary of state for Delaware in 1931, commissioner of the State Motor Vehicle Commission in 1940, and was the state librarian from 1941 to 1948. He was also a member of the Republican State Committee from 1920 to 1953, and served as chair from 1926 to 1928. He was chair of the 1922 and 1928 Republican State Conventions, and served as a delegate to the 1908, 1924, and 1928 Republican National Conventions.

Delaware General Assembly (sessions while Governor)
Year	Assembly	Senate Majority	President pro tempore	House Majority	Speaker
1921–1922	101st	Republican	Wallace S. Handy	Democratic	Walter J. Paskey Sr.
1923–1924	102nd	Democratic	Charles D. Murphy	Democratic	Samuel N. Culver

== Death and legacy ==
Denney died at Elsmere and is buried in the Christ Episcopal Church Cemetery at Dover.

== Almanac ==
Elections are held the first Tuesday after November 1. Members of the Delaware General Assembly take office the second Tuesday of January. State representatives have a two-year term. The governor takes office the third Tuesday of January and has a four-year term.

Public Offices
Office	Type	Location	Began office	Ended office	notes
State Representative	Legislature	Dover	January 10, 1905	January 8, 1907	
Governor	Executive	Dover	January 18, 1921	January 20, 1925	

Delaware General Assembly service
Dates	Assembly	Chamber	Majority	Governor	Committees	District
1905–1906	93rd	State House	Republican	Preston Lea	Speaker	Kent 2nd

Election results
Year	Office	Subject	Party	Votes	%	Opponent	Party	Votes	%
1920	Governor	William D. Denney	Republican	51,895	55%	Andrew J. Lynch	Democratic	41,038	44%

== Images ==
- Hall of Governors Portrait Gallery ; Portrait courtesy of Historical and Cultural Affairs, Dover.

== Places with more information ==
- Delaware Historical Society; website; 505 North Market Street, Wilmington, Delaware 19801; (302) 655–7161
- University of Delaware; Library website; 181 South College Avenue, Newark, Delaware 19717; (302) 831-2965

Party political offices
Preceded by John G. Townsend Jr.	Republican nominee for Governor of Delaware; 1920	Succeeded by Robert P. Robinson
Political offices
Preceded by John G. Townsend Jr.	Governor of Delaware; 1921–1925	Succeeded by Robert P. Robinson
