= Edward W. Cooch =

American politician (1876–1964)

10th Lieutenant Governor of Delaware
- In office January 19, 1937 – January 21, 1941
- Governor: Richard McMullen
- Preceded by: Roy F. Corley
- Succeeded by: Isaac J. MacCollum

Personal details
- Born: Edward Webb Cooch; January 17, 1876 Cooch's Bridge, Delaware, U.S.
- Died: November 22, 1964 (aged 88) Delaware, United States
- Party: Democratic
- Spouse: Eleanor Bedford Wilkins
- Children: Thomas Cooch; Edward W. Cooch Jr.
- Education: University of Delaware; Harvard Law School

Edward Webb Cooch Sr. (January 17, 1876 – November 22, 1964) was an American politician who served as the tenth Lieutenant Governor of Delaware from January 19, 1937, to January 21, 1941, under Governor Richard McMullen.

Political offices
Preceded by Roy F. Corley	Lieutenant Governor of Delaware; 1937–1941	Succeeded by Isaac J. MacCollum
