= Richard McMullen =

American politician (1868–1944)

Richard C. McMullen

59th Governor of Delaware
- In office January 19, 1937 – January 21, 1941
- Lieutenant: Edward W. Cooch
- Preceded by: C. Douglass Buck
- Succeeded by: Walter W. Bacon

Personal details
- Born: January 2, 1868 Glasgow, Delaware, U.S.
- Died: February 18, 1944 (aged 76) Wilmington, Delaware, U.S.
- Party: Democratic
- Spouse: Florence Hutchinson
- Education: Goldey Commercial College
- Occupation: Manufacturer

Richard Cann McMullen (January 2, 1868 – February 18, 1944) was an American manufacturer and politician from Wilmington, in New Castle County, Delaware. He was a member of the Democratic Party, who served as Governor of Delaware. McMullen was the first Democrat to be elected Governor of Delaware since Ebe W. Tunnell, who was elected in 1896.

== Early life and family ==
McMullen was born at Porters, near Glasgow, Delaware, son of James and Sarah Boulden McMullen. He worked as a farm hand to meet expenses while studying at Goldey Commercial College. He married Florence Hutchinson in 1895 and they had three children, Laura B., Richard H. and Florence and were members of the Methodist Church.

== Professional and political career ==
McMullen learned the tanning and leather business while working at the Mullin and Pierson Leather Plant, later to become the Amalgamated Leather Company. In 1917 he and two partners founded the Standard Kid Company and later became vice president, then general manager of the Allied Kid Company in Wilmington. These companies were tanneries and leading manufactures of leather products.

As a prominent businessman he had served two terms on the Wilmington City Council, had served on the Public Utilities and Unemployment Insurance Commission, and had turned down an offer to run for Mayor of Wilmington.

== Governor of Delaware ==
After reluctantly agreeing to run, he was elected Governor of Delaware in 1936, defeating Republican Harry L. Cannon, and Isaac D. Short, a Republican running as an independent. McMullen was the first Democratic governor in 36 years and throughout his term was frustrated with his inability to replace his political opponents in state government. As his term was during the latter part of the Great Depression, public works projects were going on throughout the state, including the opening of the Roosevelt Inlet at Lewes, a new bridge over Indian River Inlet and a couple of new stations for the State Police. During his term, Delaware’s “blue law” was revised, which inserted a smaller number of limitations on Sunday activities. he also endorsed the Fair Labor Standards Act, which authorized a minimum wage of 40 cents and maximum 40-hour workweek.

Delaware General Assembly (sessions while Governor)
Year	Assembly	Senate Majority	President pro tempore	House Majority	Speaker
1937-1938	109th	Republican	William A. Simonton	Democratic	John R. Fader
1939-1940	110th	Republican	David W. Steele	Republican	Frank R. Zebley

== Death and legacy ==
McMullen was again nominated as the Democratic Party candidate for governor in 1940, but suffered a heart attack a month before the election and withdrew from the campaign. He died at Wilmington and is buried there in the Riverview Cemetery.

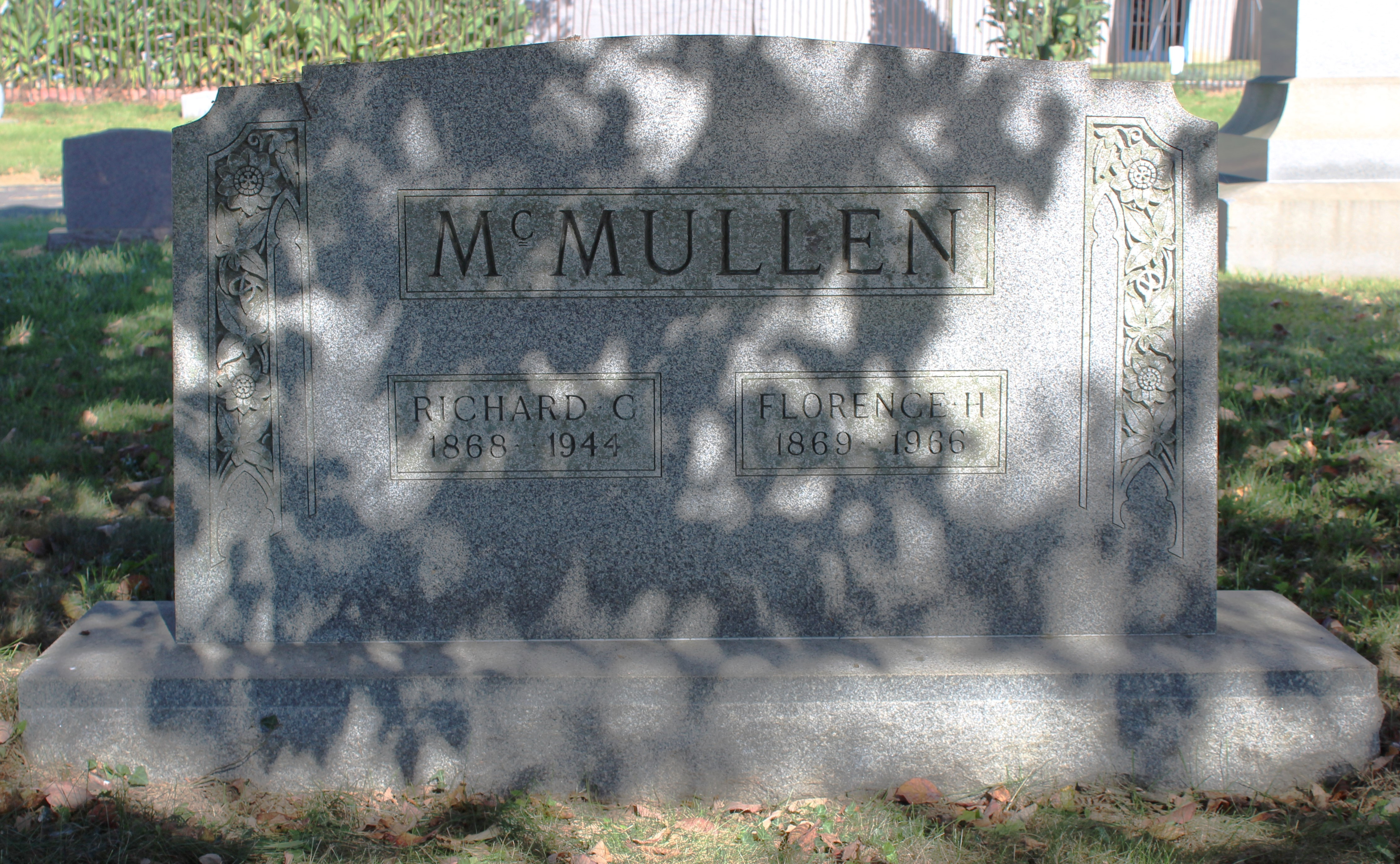
Richard McMullen gravestone in Riverview Cemetery in Wilmington, Delaware

== Almanac ==
Elections are held the first Tuesday after November 1. The governor takes office the third Tuesday of January and has a four-year term.

Public offices
Office	Type	Location	Began office	Ended office	notes
Governor	Executive	Dover	January 19, 1937	January 21, 1941	

Election results
Year	Office	Subject	Party	Votes	%	Opponent	Party	Votes	%
1936	Governor	Richard C. McMullen	Democratic	65,437	50%	Harry L. Cannon; Isaac D. Short	Republican; Independent Republican	52,782; 8,400	43% 7%

== Images ==
- Hall of Governors Portrait Gallery ; Portrait courtesy of Historical and Cultural Affairs, Dover.

== Places with more information ==
- Delaware Historical Society; website; 505 North Market Street, Wilmington, Delaware 19801; (302) 655-7161
- University of Delaware; Library website; 181 South College Avenue, Newark, Delaware 19717; (302) 831-2965

Party political offices
Preceded by Landreth L. Layton	Democratic nominee for Governor of Delaware; 1936, 1940	Succeeded by Josiah Marvel Jr.
Political offices
Preceded by C. Douglass Buck	Governor of Delaware; 1937–1941	Succeeded by Walter W. Bacon
