= C. Douglass Buck =

American politician (1890–1965)

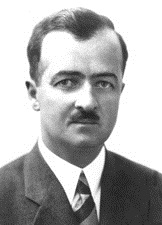

United States Senator from Delaware
- In office January 3, 1943 – January 3, 1949
- Preceded by: James H. Hughes
- Succeeded by: J. Allen Frear, Jr.

58th Governor of Delaware
- In office January 15, 1929 – January 19, 1937
- Lieutenant: James H. Hazel; Roy F. Corley
- Preceded by: Robert P. Robinson
- Succeeded by: Richard C. McMullen

Personal details
- Born: March 21, 1890 New Castle, Delaware, U.S.
- Died: January 27, 1965 (aged 74) New Castle, Delaware, U.S.
- Party: Republican
- Spouse: Alice Hounsfield du Pont
- Education: University of Pennsylvania
- Profession: Engineer

Clayton Douglass Buck (March 21, 1890 – January 27, 1965) was an American engineer and politician from New Castle Hundred, New Castle County, Delaware. He was a veteran of World War I and a member of the Republican Party, who served two terms as governor and one term as U.S. Senator from Delaware. He was known by his middle name.

== Early life and family ==
Buck was born at Buena Vista near New Castle, Delaware, son of Francis N. and Margaret Douglass Buck. His father was from Philadelphia and his mother was related to U.S. Senator and Secretary of State John M. Clayton. He married Alice Hounsfield du Pont, daughter of U.S. Senator T. Coleman du Pont, and they had two children, Clayton Douglass, Jr. and Mrs. Dorcas Van Dyke Farquhar. They were members of Immanuel Episcopal Church in New Castle. He was educated at the Wilmington Friends School and attended the University of Pennsylvania Engineering School for two years, serving in the U.S. Army during World War I.

== Professional and political career ==
By the early 20th century the Du Pont Company had become one of the world's major corporations, bringing enormous wealth to its owners and providing employment and other opportunities to their native state. One of the three key owners of the company was T. Coleman du Pont, a capable, energetic and ambitious man, who was also Buck's father-in-law. Du Pont had a vision of a superhighway running the length of Delaware, and the ambition, talent, and money to make it a reality. Construction began in 1917 and in that same year a new State Highway Department was established to oversee the work. Nevertheless, du Pont continued to pay the bills, amounting to $4 million by 1924. With his engineering education and family connections, Buck was assigned to work on the project, becoming Chief Engineer in 1921 and remaining in the role until 1929.

== Governor of Delaware ==
Buck was elected Governor of Delaware in 1928, defeating Democrat Charles M. Wharton. During this term the New York Stock Market crashed, signaling the beginning of the Great Depression. Fortunately, about the same time, Alfred I. du Pont had begun an effort to provide financial relief to those in the most need. Having failed to get such relief enacted by the Delaware General Assembly, on November 1, 1929, du Pont began mailing out personal checks of sixteen dollars to some eight hundred people. After spending some $350,000 of his own money, du Pont, appointed by Buck as chairman of the Old Age Welfare Commission, persuaded the General Assembly to take over the program in late 1930. As the economic situation continued to worsen, Buck called the General Assembly into session in November 1932 and also persuaded them to pass a $2 million emergency relief measure.

Buck was elected to a second term as governor in 1932, defeating Landreth L. Layton, the Democratic candidate, thereby becoming the first governor to be reelected under the Delaware Constitution of 1897. In doing so he was one of only two Republican governors elected that year, while Delaware was one of only six states voting to reelect U.S. President Herbert Hoover. In June 1932, Delaware became the seventh state to ratify the 21st Amendment to the United States Constitution, allowing the sale of alcoholic beverages. Governor Buck appointed State Tax Commissioner Pierre S. du Pont to head up a new State Liquor Commission to manage and tax newly available alcohol.

Buck continued to seek relief for the distressed state and in October 1933 called the General Assembly back into session to consider borrowing money from the Federal government. Once it was clear the General Assembly would never reach agreement on this measure, Buck took the unprecedented step of adjourning their session. Shortly thereafter teachers and state employees began taking reductions in their pay. In 1935 Buck had the State Highway Department assigned responsibility for the roads in the state that had formerly been maintained by the counties.

Delaware General Assembly (sessions while Governor)
Year	Assembly	Senate Majority	President pro tempore	House Majority	Speaker
1929–1930	105th	Republican	William A. Simonton	Republican	Charles W. Messick
1931–1932	106th	Republican	William A. Simonton	Republican	Bud Coy
1933–1934	107th	Republican	William A. Simonton	Democratic	Julian T. Robinson
1935–1936	108th	Republican	Levi G. Maloney	Republican	Harry V. Lyons

== United States Senator ==
Several years later, in 1942, Buck was elected to the U.S. Senate, defeating Democrat E. Ennalls Berl, a Wilmington lawyer. During the 80th Congress he was chairman of the District of Columbia Committee. Buck lost his bid for a second term in 1948 to Democrat J. Allen Frear, Jr., a businessman from Dover, Delaware. From 1953 until 1957 he was the Tax Commissioner of Delaware, another position held frequently by a member of the du Pont family.

== Death and legacy ==
Buck died at Buena Vista near New Castle and is buried in the Immanuel Episcopal Church Cemetery at New Castle.

Remaining a conservative Republican to the end of his life, he backed Ohio U.S. Senator Robert A. Taft and Arizona U.S. Senator Barry Goldwater in their presidential campaigns. His home, Buena Vista, was donated to the State of Delaware and is now used as a conference center. It was added to the National Register of Historic Places in 1971. There is a Buck Road, in Greenville, Delaware.

== Almanac ==
Elections are held the first Tuesday after November 1. The governor takes office the third Tuesday of January and has a four-year term. U.S. Senators are popularly elected and take office January 3 for a six-year term.

Public Offices
Office	Type	Location	Began office	Ended office	notes
Governor	Executive	Dover	January 15, 1929	January 16, 1933	
Governor	Executive	Dover	January 16, 1933	January 19, 1937	
U.S. Senator	Legislature	Washington	January 3, 1943	January 3, 1949	

United States Congressional service
Dates	Congress	Chamber	Majority	President	Committees	Class/District
1943–1944	78th	U.S. Senate	Democratic	Franklin D. Roosevelt	District of Columbia	class 2
1945–1946	79th	U.S. Senate	Democratic	Franklin D. Roosevelt; Harry S. Truman	District of Columbia	class 2
1947–1948	80th	U.S. Senate	Republican	Harry S. Truman	District of Columbia	class 2

Election results
Year	Office	Subject	Party	Votes	%	Opponent	Party	Votes	%
1928	Governor	C. Douglass Buck	Republican	63,716	61%	Charles M. Wharton	Democratic	40,346	39%
1932	Governor	C. Douglass Buck	Republican	60,903	54%	Landreth L. Layton	Democratic	50,401	45%
1942	U.S. Senator	C. Douglass Buck	Republican	46,210	54%	E. Ennalls Berl	Democratic	38,322	45%
1948	U.S. Senator	C. Douglass Buck	Republican	68,246	48%	J. Allen Frear, Jr.	Democratic	71,888	51%

== Images ==
- Biographical Dictionary of the United States Congress

Party political offices
Preceded by Robert P. Robinson	Republican nominee for Governor of Delaware; 1928, 1932	Succeeded by Harry L. Cannon
Preceded by Daniel O. Hastings	Republican nominee for U.S. Senator from Delaware (Class 2); 1942, 1948	Succeeded by Herbert Warburton
Political offices
Preceded by Robert P. Robinson	Governor of Delaware; 1929-1937	Succeeded by Richard C. McMullen
U.S. Senate
Preceded by James H. Hughes	U.S. Senator (Class 2) from Delaware; 1943-1949; Served alongside: James M. Tunnell, John J. Williams	Succeeded by J. Allen Frear, Jr.
