= Walter W. Bacon =

American politician (1880–1962)

60th Governor of Delaware
- In office January 21, 1941 – January 18, 1949
- Lieutenant: Isaac J. MacCollum; Elbert N. Carvel
- Preceded by: Richard C. McMullen
- Succeeded by: Elbert N. Carvel

Mayor of Wilmington
- In office January 19, 1936 – January 21, 1941
- Preceded by: George Forrest
- Succeeded by: Albert James

Personal details
- Born: January 20, 1880 New Castle, Delaware, U.S.
- Died: March 18, 1962 (aged 82) Wilmington, Delaware, U.S.
- Party: Republican
- Spouse: Mabel H. McDaniel
- Education: Beacom College
- Profession: Accountant

Walter Wolfkiel Bacon (January 20, 1880 – March 18, 1962) was an American politician and accountant from Wilmington, in New Castle County, Delaware. He was a member of the Republican Party who served three terms as Mayor of Wilmington and two terms as Governor of Delaware. He is the only mayor of a Delaware city to have been elected Governor of Delaware.

== Early life and family ==
Bacon was born at New Castle, Delaware, the son of John G. and Margaret Foster Bacon. He began selling newspapers at age 8, graduated from New Castle High School and studied at Beacom College in Wilmington. He married Mabel H. McDaniel on November 28, 1906, and had no children. They lived at the Mayfair Apartments on North Harrison Street in Wilmington and were members of the Presbyterian Church.

== Professional and political career ==
Bacon was an accountant with U.S. Steel in Chester, Pennsylvania and Philadelphia and then with the Repauno Corporation. Upon Repauno's acquisition by DuPont, he moved to the General Motors Division in Michigan, where he was treasurer with the Buick Motor Company from 1918 until 1930. Retiring early, he returned to Wilmington and entered politics. Beginning as a Republican Party committeeman, Bacon was elected to three terms as mayor of Wilmington, first in 1935 and again in 1937 and 1939.

== Governor of Delaware ==
Running for Governor of Delaware in 1940, he defeated State Democratic Party Chairman Josiah Marvel Jr., the Democratic Party candidate, and became the only Republican Party candidate elected to statewide office that year. He was elected again in 1944 when he defeated Isaac J. MacCollum, the Democratic Party candidate.

Bacon's terms as governor were marked primarily by the events of World War II and its aftermath. Thirty-three thousand Delaware citizens served in the Armed Forces in that war, and nearly 800 died. Two were awarded the Medal of Honor: Sergeant William L. Nelson of Middletown, and Sergeant James P. Connor of Wilmington. Air bases at New Castle and Dover were taken over by the U.S. Army and became major points of re-entry for returning soldiers when the war was over. Fort du Pont at Delaware City and Fort Miles at Cape Henlopen became major military installations protecting the shipping routes into the Delaware River. U-boats constantly menaced the coast from the near Atlantic, and because gas and other consumer products were mostly transported by ship, the many sinkings caused them to become very scarce. Two things not lacking were vegetables and broiler chickens. They became known as "Victory gardens," producing vegetables grew all over Delaware, and the Sussex County chicken business thrived. In fact, federal price controls created such a black market in broilers that led the army to eventually seal off the Delmarva peninsula and seize the chickens to assure an adequate supply to the military.

Through all this, Bacon steadily administered the state government. He was reputed to have been the first governor to work regular 8:30-to-5:00 hours. He managed a budget of about $13 million and nothing made him prouder than the doubling of the state's cash balance during his tenure. Social changes increasingly challenged the old fashioned "blue laws." When the General Assembly demonstrated reluctance to revise them, the State Attorney General, James R. Morford, ordered some 500 people across the state arrested for various Sabbath offenses. After the arrestees' names appeared in local newspapers, the laws began to change.

Delaware General Assembly (sessions while Governor)
Year	Assembly	Senate Majority	President pro tempore	House Majority	Speaker
1941-1942	111th	Republican	Harold W. T. Purnell	Republican	George W. Rhodes
1943-1944	112th	Republican	Clayton A. Bunting	Republican	Benjamin F. Johnson
1945-1946	113th	Republican	Harry H. Mulholland	Republican	Chester V. Townsend Jr.
1947-1948	114th	Republican	George W. Rhodes	Republican	William T. Chipman

== Death and legacy ==
Bacon died at Wilmington and is buried in the Old Drawyer's Presbyterian Churchyard at Odessa, Delaware.

Bacon has been described "as a simple man with simple tastes. He didn't drink, liked baseball, saw every Shirley Temple movie that came to town, pinched pennies, and perhaps was the right man for the right time when he was governor." After the war, the U.S. Government facilities at Fort du Pont, near Delaware City, were deeded to the state and made into a state health care facility. They were named in his honor and became the Governor Bacon Health Center.

== Almanac ==
Elections are held the first Tuesday after November 1. The governor takes office the third Tuesday of January, and has a four-year term.

Public Offices
Office	Type	Location	Began office	Ended office	notes
Mayor	Executive	Wilmington	January 19, 1936	January 15, 1938	
Mayor	Executive	Wilmington	January 19, 1938	January 15, 1940	
Mayor	Executive	Wilmington	January 19, 1940	January 21, 1941	resigned
Governor	Executive	Dover	January 21, 1941	January 19, 1945	
Governor	Executive	Dover	January 19, 1945	January 18, 1949	

Election results
Year	Office	Subject	Party	Votes	%	Opponent	Party	Votes	%
1940	Governor	Walter W. Bacon	Republican	70,629	52%	Josiah Marvel, Jr.	Democratic	61,237	45%
1944	Governor	Walter W. Bacon	Republican	63,829	51%	Isaac J. MacCollum	Democratic	62,156	49%

== Images ==
- Hall of Governors Portrait Gallery; Portrait courtesy of Historical and Cultural Affairs, Dover

Party political offices
Preceded by Harry L. Cannon	Republican nominee for Governor of Delaware; 1940, 1944	Succeeded by Hyland P. George
Political offices
Preceded by Richard C. McMullen	Governor of Delaware; 1941–1949	Succeeded by Elbert N. Carvel
