= William A. Simonton =

American politician (1871–1951)

President pro tempore of the Delaware Senate
- In office January 3, 1929 – January 3, 1935; January 3, 1937 – January 3, 1939
- Preceded by: William F. Allen (first term); Levi G. Maloney (second term)
- Succeeded by: Levi G. Maloney (first term); David Steele (second term)

Member of the Delaware Senate from New Castle County
- In office January 3, 1923 – January 3, 1939

Personal details
- Born: September 28, 1871 Peoria, Illinois, U.S.
- Died: October 9, 1951 (aged 80) Wilmington, Delaware, U.S.
- Party: Republican
- Spouse: Hetty May Hull
- Children: one
- Occupation: farmer, railroad executive (DuPont)

William A. Simonton (September 28, 1871 – October 9, 1951) was an American politician in the U.S. state of Delaware. He served as a senator from New Castle County, Delaware from 1923 until 1939. Simonton, a Republican, was also the senate's President pro tempore in from 1929 until 1955 and 1937 until 1939. He had also served as the Dean of the State Senate. During his time as pro tempore of the senate, Simonton was the last one to serve in the Old State House and the first to serve in the new Delaware Legislative Hall. An executive at DuPont, Simonton was also a prominent trapshooter. He died in 1951 at his home in Wilmington.
