= 123rd Delaware General Assembly =

American legislative session

| ← | 122nd | 124th | → |

Overview
- Legislative body: Delaware General Assembly
- Term: January 5, 1965 – January 3, 1967

The 123rd Delaware General Assembly was a meeting of the legislative branch of the state government, consisting of the Delaware Senate and the Delaware House of Representatives. Elections were held the first Tuesday after November 1 and terms began in Dover on the first Tuesday in January. This date was January 5, 1965, which was two weeks before the beginning of the first administrative year of Governor Charles L. Terry Jr. and Sherman W. Tribbitt as Lieutenant Governor.

Currently the distribution of seats for both houses was based on a court interpretation of the federal 1960 census. It resulted in a large shift in membership numbers to the New Castle County area and ruling that the election districts would abandonment of county lines for their boundaries, but could design whatever district boundaries that would accomplish such population equals. Subsequent census were adjusted such boundaries to continue such adjectives, the next being in 1972.

In the 123rd Delaware General Assembly session both chambers had a Democratic majority.

== Leadership ==
=== Senate ===
- Curtis W. Steen, Sussex County, Democratic

=== House of Representatives ===
- Harold T. Bockman, New Castle County, Democratic

== Members ==
=== Senate ===
About half the State Senators were elected every two years for a four-year term, except the decade district redesign year, when all served two years. They were designed for equal populations from all districts and its accomplishment occasionally included some territory from two counties.

New Castle County

- 1. Russell D. F. Dineen
- 2. Herman M. Holloway Sr.
- 3. George F. Schlor
- 4. Joseph A. Martin
- 5. Louise Conner
- 6. John C. Kinahan

- 7. Reynolds du Pont
- 8. Margaret R. Manning
- 9. Anthony C. Moore
- 10. Robert I. Carney
- 11. Calvin R. McCullough
- 12. Robert C. Davidson

Kent County

- 13. Allen J. Cook
- 14. James D. McGinnis
- 15. George A. Robbins

Sussex County

- 16. Walter J. Hoey
- 17. Curtis W. Steen
- 18. Eugene Bookhammer

=== House of Representatives ===
All the State Representatives were elected every two years for a two-year term. They were designed for equal populations from all districts and its accomplishment occasionally included some territory from two counties.

New Castle County

- 1. Charles K. Kell
- 2. Harry S. Wilson
- 3. Oliver S. Fonville
- 4. Reese Hammond
- 5. Paul E. Shockley
- 6. Frank A. Parisi
- 7. John J. McMahon
- 8. Michael DiEleuterio
- 9. T. Lee Bartleson
- 10. Maurice Fitzharris
- 11. Clarice U. Heckert
- 12. David S. Benson

- 13. Robert N. Downs III
- 14. Everette Hale
- 15. Vincent Bifferato
- 16. Ralph Edmanson
- 17. Robert J. Wilson
- 18. Harold T. Bockman
- 19. Mary E. Gooding
- 20. Melvin Slawik
- 21. John P. Ferguson
- 22. James Quigley
- 23. Carlton Blendt Jr.
- 24. William E. Alsip

Kent County

- 25. Glenn W. Busker
- 26. Jacob W. Zimmerman
- 27. John P Kelly
- 28. Dawson H. Shulties
- 29. Maurice Adams

Sussex County

- 30. W. Carlton Clifton
- 31. Norman A. Eskridge
- 32. William H. Phillips
- 33. Monroe B. Hudson
- 34. John M. Lecato
- 35. M. Martin Isaacs

== Places with more information ==
- Delaware Historical Society; website; 505 North Market Street, Wilmington, Delaware 19801; (302) 655-7161.
- University of Delaware; Library website; 181 South College Avenue, Newark, Delaware 19717; (302) 831-2965.
