= 121st Delaware General Assembly =

American legislative session

| ← | 120th | 122nd | → |

Overview
- Legislative body: Delaware General Assembly
- Term: January 3, 1961 – January 8, 1963

The 121st Delaware General Assembly was a meeting of the legislative state, consisting of the Delaware Senate and the Delaware House of Representatives. Elections were held the first Tuesday after November 1 and terms began in Dover on the first Tuesday in January. This date was January 3, 1961, which was two weeks before the beginning of the fifth administrative year of Governor Elbert N. Carvel and at the first administrative year of Eugene Lammot as Lieutenant Governor.

Currently the distribution of the Senate Assembly seats was made to seven senators for New Castle County and for five senators to each Kent and Sussex counties. Likewise the current distribution of the House Assembly seats was made to fifteen representatives for New Castle County and for ten representatives each to Kent and Sussex counties. The actual population changes of the county did not directly affect the number of senators or representatives at this time.

In the 121st Delaware General Assembly session both chambers had a Democratic majority.

== Leadership ==
=== Senate ===
- John B. Reilly, New Castle County, Democratic

=== House of Representatives ===
- Sherman W. Tribbitt, New Castle County, Democratic

== Members ==
=== Senate ===
About half of the State Senators were elected every two years for a four-year term. They were from a district in a specific county, with the number of districts determined by the state constitution, not the size of the population.

New Castle County

- 1. James H. Snowden
- 2. John B. Reilly Sr.
- 3. Reynolds du Pont
- 4. Margaret R. Manning
- 5. Calvin R. McCullough
- 6. B. Walter Johnson
- 7. Jesse F. Watson

Kent County

- 1. Henry T. Price Sr.
- 2. Allen J. Cook
- 3. Walter H. Simpson
- 4. Leon E. Donovan
- 5. Harry E. Mayhew

Sussex County

- 1. Walter J. Hoey
- 2. Earle M. Tull
- 3. Curtis W. Steen
- 4. William F. Wilgus Jr.
- 5. Harvey B. Spicer

=== House of Representatives ===
All the State Representatives were elected every two years for a two-year term. They were from a district in a specific county, with the number of districts determined by the state constitution, not the size of the population.

New Castle County

- 1. Paul F. Livingston
- 2. Russell D. F. Dineen
- 3. Ralph S. Keenan
- 4. Paul E. Shockley
- 5. Thomas P. Murray
- 6. T. Lees Bartleson
- 7. Robert N. Downs III
- 8. Andrew Casey
- 9. Charles S. Kleinbach
- 10. James R. Quigley
- 11. Robert E. Pawson
- 12. Robert C. Davidson
- 13. Sherman W. Tribbitt
- 14. Charles Gove Jr.
- 15. Carlton Blendt Jr.

Kent County

- 1. Glenn W. Busker
- 2. George Ehinger
- 3. Carl Prettyman
- 4. Orville Myers
- 5. Charles F. Richards Sr.
- 6. Dawson H. Shulties
- 7. Harvey P. Fifer
- 8. William J. Paskey Jr.
- 9. George H. Exley
- 10. George A. Robbins

Sussex County

- 1. W. Carlton Clifton
- 2. John Annett
- 3. Norman A. Eskridge
- 4. Jennings Moore
- 5. William H. Phillips
- 6. Walter D. Baker
- 7. Wilbur E. Hocker
- 8. William W. Baker Sr.
- 9. Robert Snowden
- 10. William T. Best

== Places with more information ==
- Delaware Historical Society; website; 505 North Market Street, Wilmington, Delaware 19801; (302) 655-7161.
- University of Delaware; Library website; 181 South College Avenue, Newark, Delaware 19717; (302) 831-2965.
