= 124th Delaware General Assembly =

American legislative session

←	123rd	125th	→

Overview
- Legislative body: Delaware General Assembly
- Term: January 3, 1967 – January 7, 1969

The 124th Delaware General Assembly was a meeting of the legislative branch of the state government, consisting of the Delaware Senate and the Delaware House of Representatives. Elections were held the first Tuesday after November 1 and terms began in Dover on the first Tuesday in January. This date was January 3, 1967, which was two weeks before the beginning of the third administrative year of Governor Charles L. Terry Jr. and Sherman W. Tribbitt as Lieutenant Governor.

Currently the distribution of seats for both houses was based on a court interpreted interpretation of the federal 1960 census. It resulted in a large shift in membership numbers to the New Castle County area and ruling that the election districts would abandonment of county lines for their boundaries, but could design whatever district boundaries that would accomplish such population equals. Subsequent census were adjusted such boundaries to continue such adjectives, the next being in 1972.

In the 124th Delaware General Assembly session the Senate had a Democratic majority and the House had a Republican majority.

== Leadership ==
=== Senate ===
- Calvin R. McCullough, New Castle County, Democratic

=== House of Representatives ===
- George C. Hering III, New Castle County, Republican

== Members ==
=== Senate ===
About half the State Senators were elected every two years for a four-year term, except the decade district redesign year, when all served two years. They were designed for equal populations from all districts and its accomplishment occasionally included some territory from two counties.

New Castle County

- 1. Russell D. F. Dineen
- 2. Herman M. Holloway Sr.
- 3. George F. Schlor
- 4. Ralph Keenan
- 5. Louise Conner
- 6. John C. Kinahan

New Castle County

- 7. Reynolds du Pont
- 8. Margaret R. Manning
- 9. Anthony C. Moore
- 10. Robert I. Carney
- 11. Calvin R. McCullough
- 12. J. Donald Isaacs

Kent County

- 13. Allen J. Cook
- 14. Andrew Foltz
- 15. George A. Robbins

Sussex County

- 16. Frank R. Grier
- 17. Curtis W. Steen
- 18. Eugene Bookhammer

=== House of Representatives ===
All the State Representatives were elected every two years for a two-year term. They were designed for equal populations from all districts and its accomplishment occasionally included some territory from two counties.

New Castle County

- 1. Fred Brown
- 2. Raymond T. Evans
- 3. Oliver S. Fonville
- 4. Reese Hammond
- 5. Paul E. Shockley
- 6. Michael N. Castle
- 7. John J. McMahon
- 8. George C. Hering III
- 9. T. Lee Bartleson
- 10. Herbert A. Lesher
- 11. Clarice U. Heckert
- 12. David S. Benson

New Castle County

- 13. W. Laird Stabler
- 14. Everette Hale
- 15. Mario Pagano
- 16. William F. Hart
- 17. Anthony J. Cicione
- 18. William L. Frederick
- 19. Mary E. Gooding
- 20. Melvin A. Slawik
- 21. John P. Ferguson
- 22. Joseph T. Cashman
- 23. Carlton Blendt Jr.
- 24. Joseph R. Murphy Jr.

Kent County

- 25. Robert W. Riddagh
- 26. Jacob W. Zimmerman
- 27. Lorin B. Sebrell
- 28. Robert L. Pleasanton
- 29. G. Robert Quillen

Sussex County

- 30. Lewis B. Harrington
- 31. Norman A. Eskridge
- 32. William H. Phillips
- 33. George E. Gray
- 34. Robert M. Dodge
- 35. Louis W. Burton

== Places with more information ==
- Delaware Historical Society; website; 505 North Market Street, Wilmington, Delaware 19801; (302) 655-7161.
- University of Delaware; Library website; 181 South College Avenue, Newark, Delaware 19717; (302) 831-2965.
