= 1964 Delaware lieutenant gubernatorial election =

- November 3, 1964
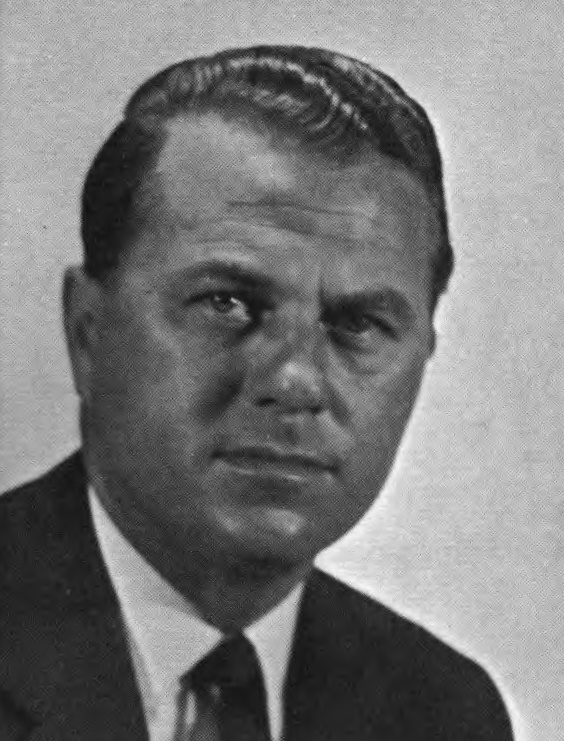

Nominee	Sherman W. Tribbitt	William T. Best
Party	Democratic	Republican
Popular vote	108,742	89,675
Percentage	54.81%	45.19%
- County results Tribbitt: 50–60%
Lieutenant Governor before election
Eugene Lammot
Democratic
Elected Lieutenant Governor
Sherman W. Tribbitt
Democratic

The 1964 Delaware lieutenant gubernatorial election was held on November 3, 1964, in order to elect the lieutenant governor of Delaware. Democratic nominee and incumbent member of the Delaware House of Representatives Sherman W. Tribbitt defeated Republican nominee William T. Best.

== General election ==
On election day, November 3, 1964, Democratic nominee Sherman W. Tribbitt won the election by a margin of 19,067 votes against his opponent Republican nominee William T. Best, thereby retaining Democratic control over the office of lieutenant governor. Tribbitt was sworn in as the 17th lieutenant governor of Delaware on January 19, 1965.

=== Results ===
Delaware lieutenant gubernatorial election, 1964
Party	Candidate	Votes	%
Democratic	Sherman W. Tribbitt	108,742	54.81
Republican	William T. Best	89,675	45.19
Total votes		198,417	100.00
Democratic hold			
