= 1972 Delaware gubernatorial election =

- November 7, 1972
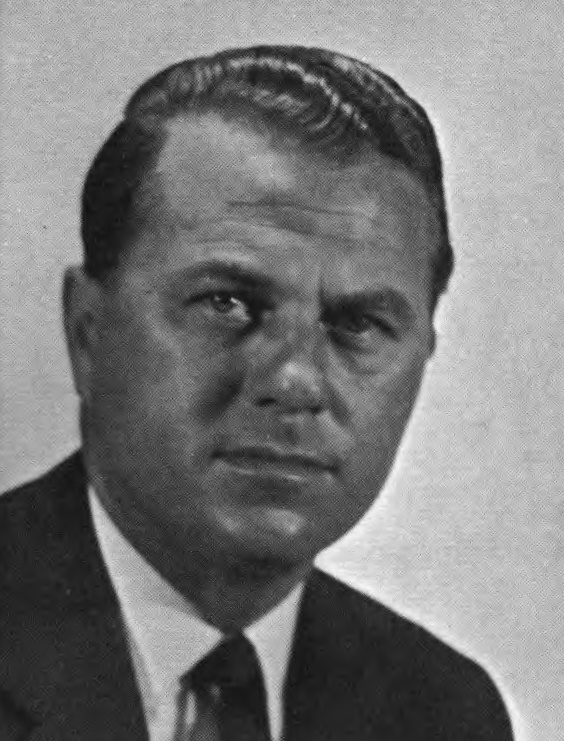

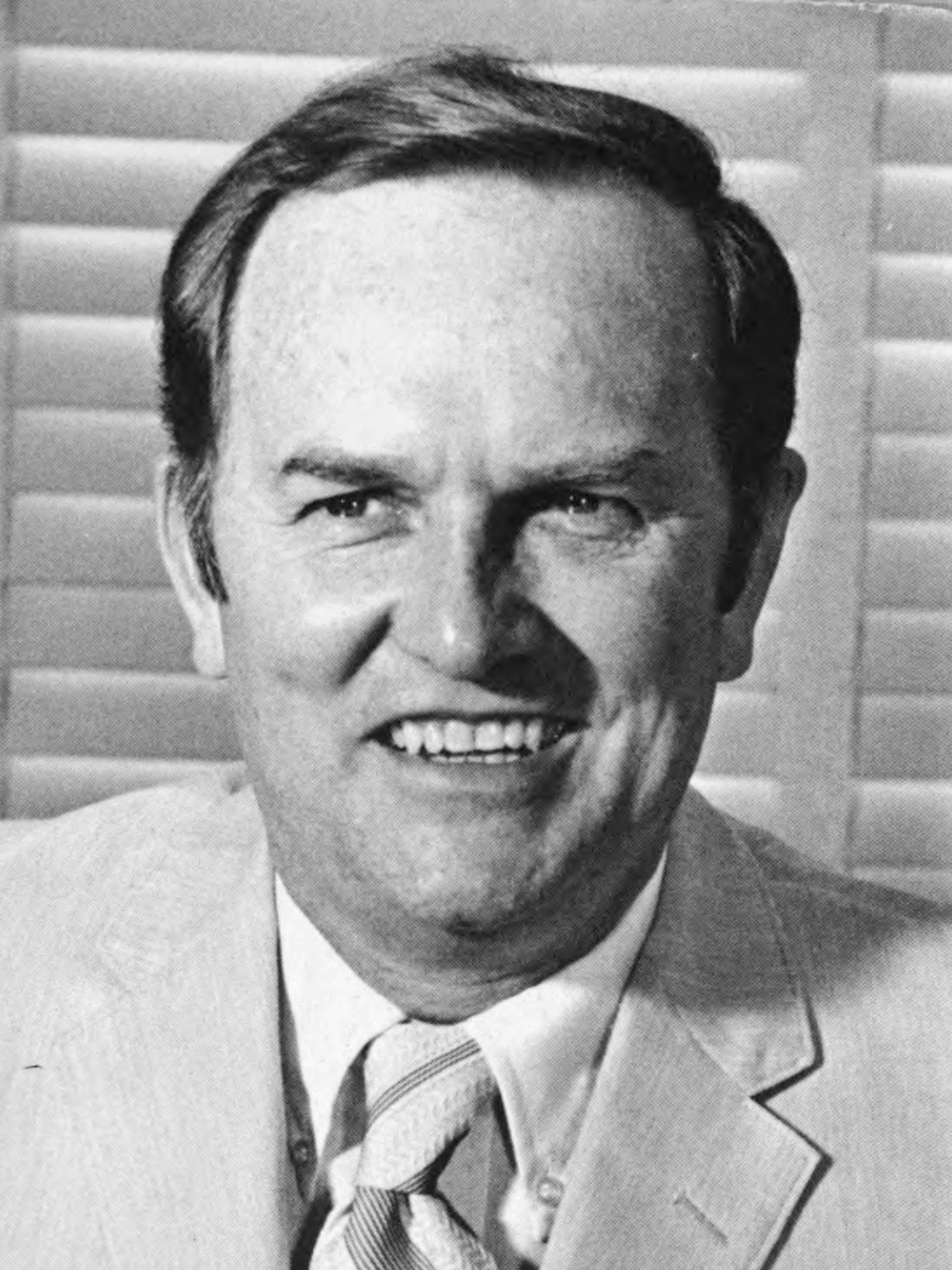
Nominee	Sherman W. Tribbitt	Russell W. Peterson
Party	Democratic	Republican
Popular vote	117,274	109,583
Percentage	51.27%	47.91%
- Tribbitt: 50–60% 60–70% 70–80% Peterson: 50–60% 60–70% 70–80%
Governor before election
Russell W. Peterson
Republican
Elected Governor
Sherman W. Tribbitt
Democratic

The 1972 Delaware gubernatorial election was held on November 7, 1972. Democratic nominee Sherman W. Tribbitt defeated incumbent Republican Governor Russell W. Peterson with 51.27% of the vote. This was the last time a Democrat won a gubernatorial election in Delaware until 1992, when Tom Carper (future U.S. senator) won the gubernatorial election over Republican B. Gary Scott.

== Nominations ==
From 1972 to 1992, Delaware used a system of "challenge" primaries, in which a candidate for statewide office who received at least 35 percent of the convention vote could challenge the endorsed candidate in a primary. Democratic nominee Tribbitt avoided such a primary in 1972.

=== Republican primary ===
==== Candidates ====
- David P. Buckson, former governor
- Russell W. Peterson, incumbent governor

==== Results ====
Republican primary results
Party	Candidate	Votes	%
Republican	Russell W. Peterson (incumbent)	23,929	54.30
Republican	David P. Buckson	20,138	45.70
Total votes		44,077	100.00

== General election ==
=== Candidates ===
- Harry H. Conner, Prohibition
- Virginia M. Lyndall, American
- Russell W. Peterson, Republican, incumbent governor
- Sherman W. Tribbitt, Democratic, Delaware House of Representatives minority leader and former lieutenant governor

=== Results ===
1972 Delaware gubernatorial election
Party	Candidate	Votes	%	±%
Democratic	Sherman W. Tribbitt	117,274	51.27%	
Republican	Russell W. Peterson (incumbent)	109,583	47.91%	
American	Virginia M. Lyndall	1,468	0.64%	
Prohibition	Harry H. Conner	397	0.17%	
Majority		7,691	3.36%	
Turnout		228,722	100.00%	
Democratic gain from Republican		Swing		

==== By county ====
County	Russell Peterson Republican		Sherman Tribbitt Democratic		All others	
County	#	%	#	%	#	%
Kent	10,254	36.8%	17,331	62.2%	300	1.0%
New Castle	85,560	51.0%	81,043	48.3%	1,256	0.8%
Sussex	13,769	41.8%	18,900	57.3%	309	1.0%
Totals	109,583	47.9%	117,274	51.3%	1,865	0.8%

Counties that flipped from Republican to Democratic

- Sussex

== Bibliography ==
- Burton D. Willis, Commissioner of Elections (1973). Official Results of General Election, 1972 (PDF). State of Delaware. Archived from the original (PDF) on December 3, 2016.
- Glashan, Roy R. (1979). American Governors and Gubernatorial Elections, 1775-1978. Meckler Books. ISBN 0-930466-17-9.
- Gubernatorial Elections, 1787-1997. Washington, D.C.: Congressional Quarterly Inc. 1998. ISBN 1-56802-396-0.
- Scammon, Richard M., ed. (1973). America Votes 10: a handbook of contemporary American election statistics, 1972. Washington, D.C.: Governmental Affairs Institute.
