= 1980 Delaware gubernatorial election =

- November 4, 1980
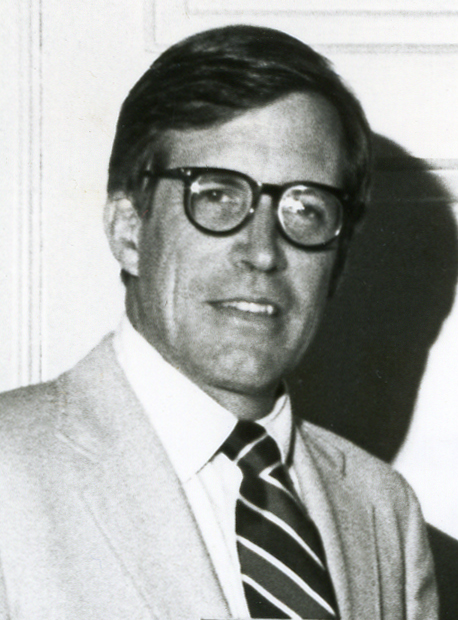

Nominee	Pete du Pont	William J. Gordy
Party	Republican	Democratic
Popular vote	159,004	64,217
Percentage	70.66%	28.54%
- du Pont: 50–60% 60–70% 70–80% 80–90% Gordy: 50–60% 60–70%
Governor before election
Pete du Pont
Republican
Elected Governor
Pete du Pont
Republican

The 1980 Delaware gubernatorial election took place on November 4, 1980. Popular incumbent Republican governor Pierre S. "Pete" du Pont IV was re-elected to a second term in office, defeating Democrat William Gordy. In doing so, du Pont became the first governor since J. Caleb Boggs in 1956 to succeed in winning re-election.

== Results ==
1980 Delaware gubernatorial election
Party	Candidate	Votes	%	±%
Republican	Pierre S. duPont IV (incumbent)	159,004	70.66%	
Democratic	William J. Gordy	64,217	28.54%	
Libertarian	Lawrence Levy	1,815	0.81%	
Republican hold		Swing		

=== By county ===
County	Pete DuPont Republican		William Gordy Democratic		All Others	
County	#	%	#	%	#	%
Kent	19,895	69.2%	8,666	30.2%	181	0.6%
New Castle	115,150	71.7%	43,821	27.3%	1,539	0.9%
Sussex	23,959	66.9%	11,730	32.7%	140	0.4%
Totals	159,004	70.6%	64,217	28.5%	1,860	0.8%

Counties that flipped from Democratic to Republican

- Kent
