= 1976 Delaware gubernatorial election =

- November 2, 1976
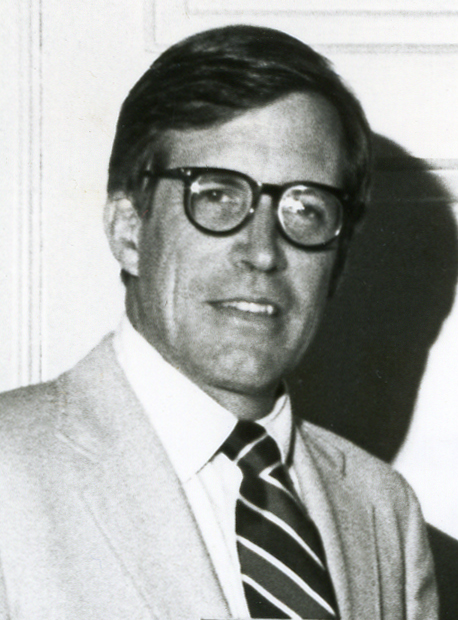

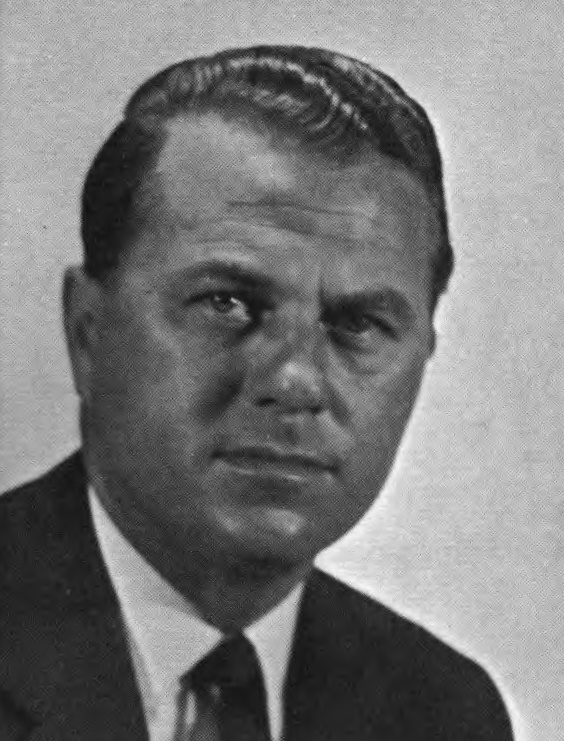
Nominee	Pete du Pont	Sherman W. Tribbitt
Party	Republican	Democratic
Popular vote	130,531	97,480
Percentage	56.86%	42.46%
- du Pont: 50–60% 60–70% 70–80% 80–90% Tribbitt: 50–60% 60–70%
Governor before election
Sherman W. Tribbitt
Democratic
Elected Governor
Pete du Pont
Republican

The 1976 Delaware gubernatorial election was held on November 2, 1976. Pitting incumbent Democratic Governor Sherman W. Tribbitt Against U.S. Representative Pete du Pont. Largely due to the state's unresolved financial problems, du Pont defeated Governor Tribbitt by a landslide margin of 57% to 42%. This is the last time that an incumbent governor of Delaware lost re-election.

== Nominations ==
From 1972 to 1992 Delaware used a system of “challenge” primaries, in which a candidate for statewide office who received at least 35 percent of the convention vote could challenge the endorsed candidate in a primary. No such primaries were held in 1976.

== General election ==
=== Candidates ===
- Sherman W. Tribbitt, Democratic, incumbent Governor
- Pete du Pont, Republican, U.S. Representative for Delaware's at-large congressional district
- George W. Cripps, American, former Delaware Auditor of Accounts
- Harry Conner, Prohibition

=== Results ===
1976 Delaware gubernatorial election
Party	Candidate	Votes	%	±%
Republican	Pierre S. duPont IV	130,531	56.86%	
Democratic	Sherman W. Tribbitt (incumbent)	97,480	42.46%	
American	George W. Cripps	1,255	0.55%	
Prohibition	Harry Conner	297	0.13%	
Majority		33,051	14.40%	
Turnout		229,563	100.00%	
Republican gain from Democratic		Swing		

==== By county ====
County	Pete DuPont Republican		Sherman Tribbitt Democratic		All Others	
County	#	%	#	%	#	%
Kent	11,849	41.1%	16,540	57.4%	413	1.4%
New Castle	100,032	60.4%	46,756	39.1%	962	0.5%
Sussex	18,650	53.3%	16,184	46.2%	177	0.5%
Totals	130,531	56.9%	97,480	42.5%	1,552	0.7%

Counties that flipped from Democratic to Republican

- Sussex

== Bibliography ==
- Lewis C. Wrightson, Commissioner of Elections (1977). Official Results of General Election, 1976 (PDF). State of Delaware. Archived from the original (PDF) on December 3, 2016.
- Glashan, Roy R. (1979). American Governors and Gubernatorial Elections, 1775-1978. Meckler Books. ISBN 0-930466-17-9.
- Gubernatorial Elections, 1787-1997. Washington, D.C.: Congressional Quarterly Inc. 1998. ISBN 1-56802-396-0.
- Scammon, Richard M.; McGillivray, Alice V. (1977). America Votes 12: a handbook of contemporary American election statistics, 1976. Washington, D.C.: Elections Research Center.
