= Januar D. Bove Jr. =

American politician (1920–1991)

36th Delaware Attorney General
- In office 1959–1963
- Governor: J. Caleb Boggs; David P. Buckson; Elbert N. Carvel
- Preceded by: Joseph D. Craven
- Succeeded by: David P. Buckson

Personal details
- Born: August 17, 1920 Wilmington, Delaware, US
- Died: October 16, 1991 (aged 71) Wilmington, Delaware, US
- Party: Republican
- Education: University of Delaware (BA); Harvard Law School (JD)

Januar D. Bove Jr. (August 17, 1920 – October 16, 1991) was an American politician who served as the Delaware Attorney General from 1959 to 1963.
