= 1968 Delaware gubernatorial election =

- November 5, 1968
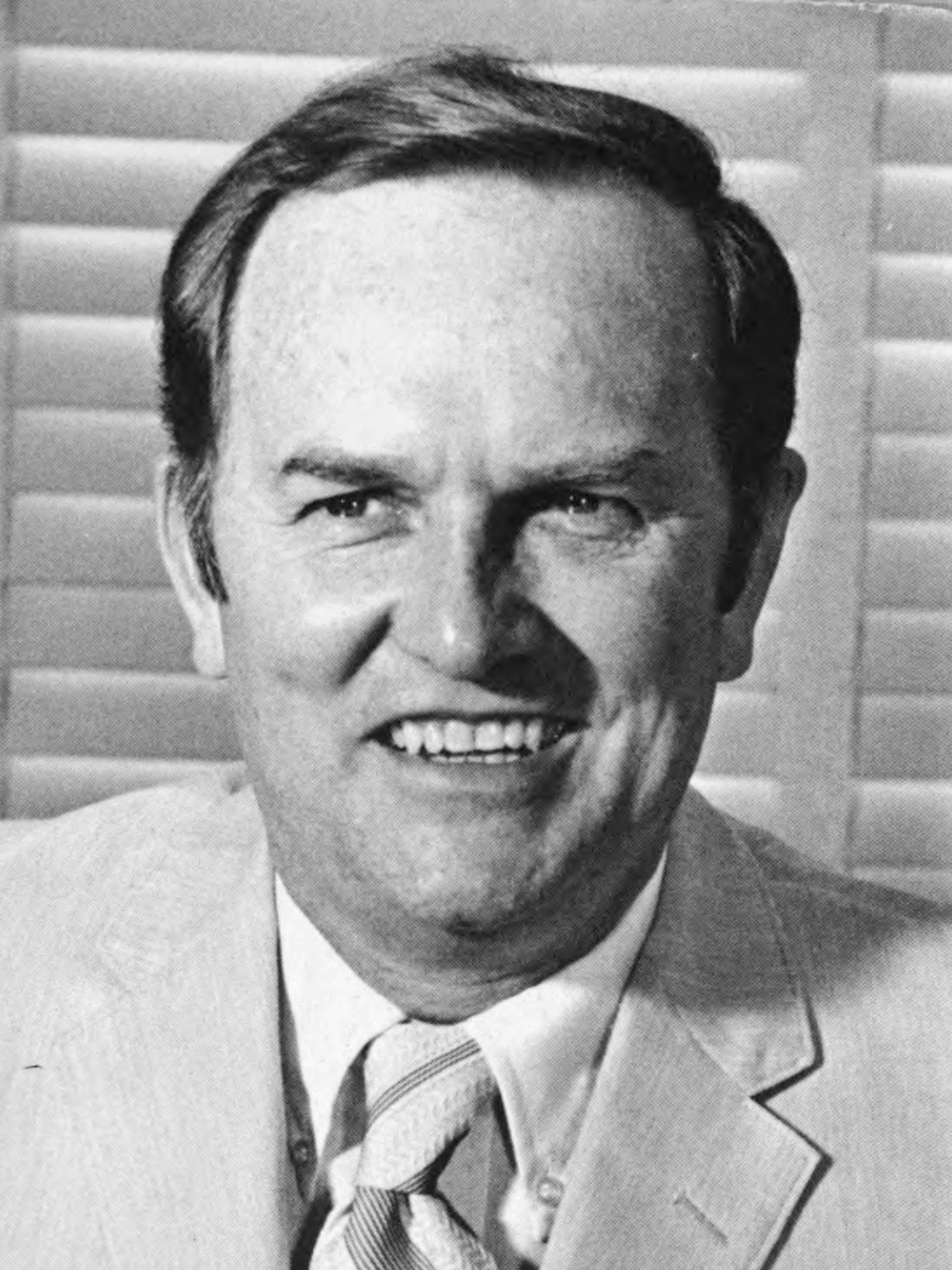

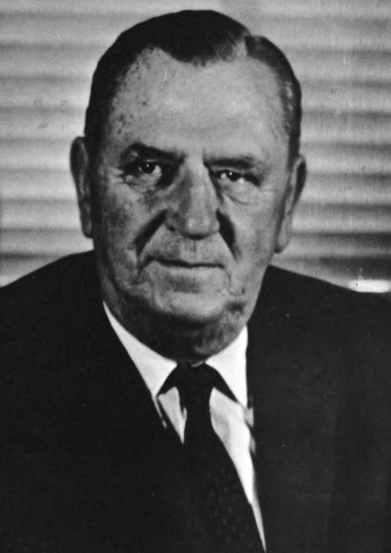
Nominee	Russell W. Peterson	Charles L. Terry Jr.
Party	Republican	Democratic
Popular vote	104,474	102,360
Percentage	50.51%	49.49%
- Peterson: 50–60% 60–70% 70–80% Terry: 50–60% 60–70% 70–80%
Governor before election
Charles L. Terry Jr.
Democratic
Elected Governor
Russell W. Peterson
Republican

The 1968 Delaware gubernatorial election was held on November 5, 1968. Republican nominee Russell W. Peterson defeated incumbent Democratic Governor Charles L. Terry Jr. with 50.51% of the vote.

== General election ==
=== Nominations ===
Nominations were made by party conventions.

=== Candidates ===
- Russell W. Peterson, Republican, civic activist
- Charles L. Terry Jr., Democratic, incumbent Governor

=== Results ===
1968 Delaware gubernatorial election
Party	Candidate	Votes	%	±%
Republican	Russell W. Peterson	104,474	50.51%	
Democratic	Charles L. Terry Jr. (incumbent)	102,360	49.49%	
Majority		2,114	1.02%	
Turnout		206,834	100.00%	
Republican gain from Democratic		Swing		

==== By county ====
County	Russell Peterson Republican		Charles Terry Democratic		All Others	
County	#	%	#	%	#	%
Kent	10,348	43.4%	13,471	56.6%	0	0.0%
New Castle	77,209	51.0%	74,323	49.0%	0	0.0%
Sussex	16,917	53.7%	14,566	46.3%	0	0.0%
Totals	104,474	50.5%	102,360	49.5%	0	0.0%

Counties that flipped from Democratic to Republican

- New Castle
- Sussex

== Bibliography ==
- George W. Cripps, Commissioner of Elections (1969). Official Results of General Election, 1968 (PDF). State of Delaware. Archived from the original (PDF) on June 4, 2020.
- Gubernatorial Elections, 1787-1997. Washington, D.C.: Congressional Quarterly Inc. 1998. ISBN 1-56802-396-0.
- Scammon, Richard M., ed. (1970). America Votes 8: a handbook of contemporary American election statistics, 1968. Washington, D.C.: Governmental Affairs Institute.
