= 1964 Delaware gubernatorial election =

- November 3, 1964
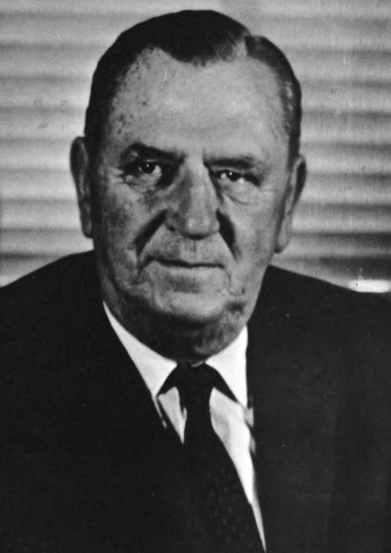

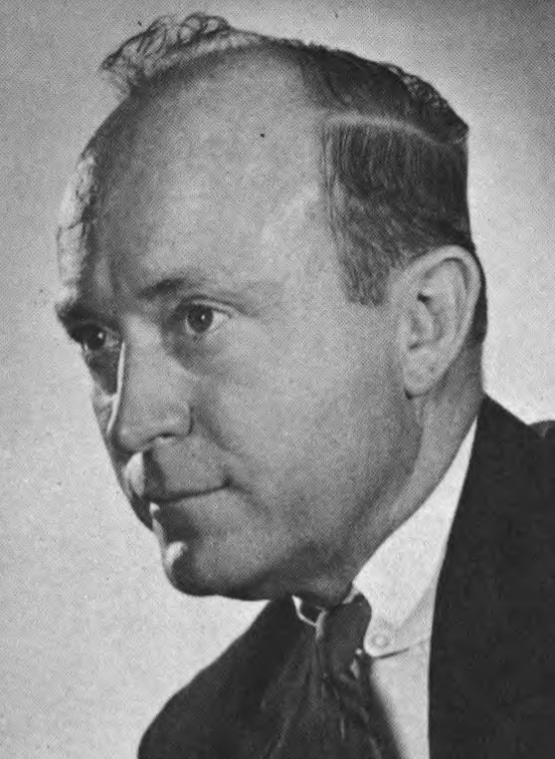
Nominee	Charles L. Terry Jr.	David P. Buckson
Party	Democratic	Republican
Popular vote	102,797	97,374
Percentage	51.35%	48.65%
- County results Terry: 50–60%
Governor before election
Elbert N. Carvel
Democratic
Elected Governor
Charles L. Terry Jr.
Democratic

The 1964 Delaware gubernatorial election was held on November 3, 1964.

Incumbent Democratic Governor Elbert N. Carvel was term-limited, having served two non-consecutive terms. Carvel instead ran for the U.S. Senate.

Democratic nominee Charles L. Terry Jr. defeated Republican nominee David P. Buckson with 51.35% of the vote.

== General election ==
=== Nominations ===
Nominations were made by party conventions.

=== Candidates ===
- David P. Buckson, Republican, incumbent Attorney General of Delaware and former Governor
- Charles L. Terry Jr., Democratic, Chief Justice of the Delaware Supreme Court

=== Results ===
1964 Delaware gubernatorial election
Party	Candidate	Votes	%	±%
Democratic	Charles L. Terry Jr.	102,797	51.35%	
Republican	David P. Buckson	97,374	48.65%	
Majority		5,423	2.71%	
Turnout		200,171	100.00%	
Democratic hold		Swing		

==== By county ====
County	David Buckson Republican		Charles Terry Democratic		All Others	
County	#	%	#	%	#	%
Kent	10,790	49.4%	11,035	50.6%	0	0.0%
New Castle	71,207	48.8%	74,824	51.2%	0	0.0%
Sussex	15,377	47.6%	16,938	52.4%	0	0.0%
Totals	97,374	48.6%	102,797	51.4%	0	0.0%

== Bibliography ==
- Gubernatorial Elections, 1787-1997. Washington, D.C.: Congressional Quarterly Inc. 1998. ISBN 1-56802-396-0.
- Scammon, Richard M., ed. (1966). America Votes 6: a handbook of contemporary American election statistics, 1964. Washington, D.C.: Governmental Affairs Institute.
