= 1970 United States House of Representatives election in Delaware =

- November 3, 1970
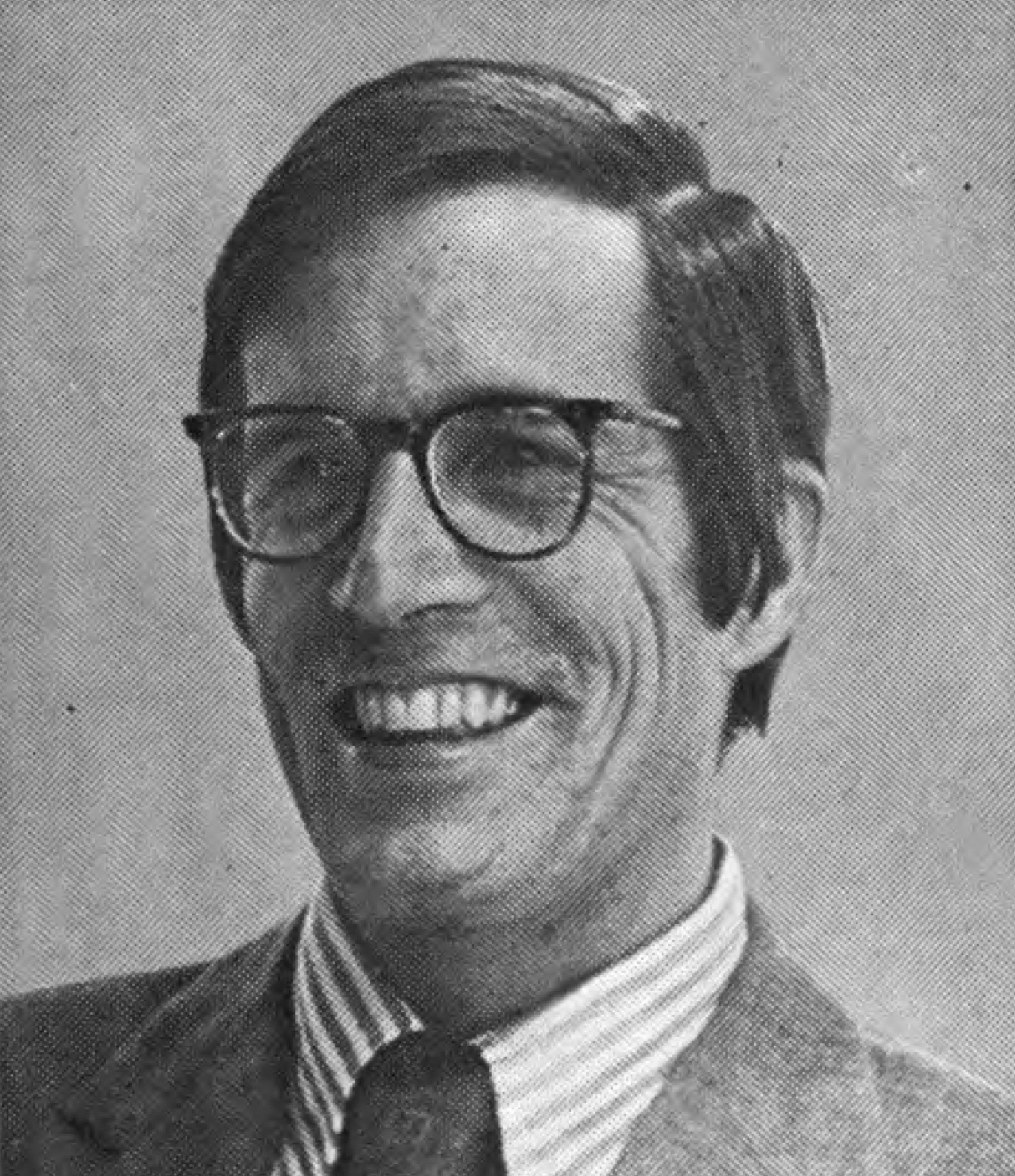

| Nominee | Pete du Pont | John D. Daniello |
| Party | Republican | Democratic |
| Popular vote | 86,125 | 71,429 |
| Percentage | 53.7% | 44.6% |
- County results Pont: 40–50% 50–60%
U.S. Representative before election
William Roth
Republican
Elected U.S. Representative
Pete du Pont
Republican

The 1970 United States House of Representatives election in Delaware took place on November 3, 1970. Incumbent representative William Roth decided to run in the concurrent US Senate election instead of running for re-election to a third term. Republican candidate, Pete du Pont won the open seat against Democrat John Daniello by a 9 point margin.

== Results ==
General election results
| Party | Candidate | Votes | % | ±% |
|---|---|---|---|---|
| Republican | Pete du Pont | 86,125 | 53.72% | ▼4.9 |
| Democratic | John D. Daniello | 71,429 | 44.56% | ▲3.2 |
| American Independent | Walter Hoey | 2,759 | 1.72% | ▲1.7 |
| Total votes | | 160,313 | 100.00% | |
| Republican hold | | | | |
