= Pete du Pont =

American politician (1935–2021)

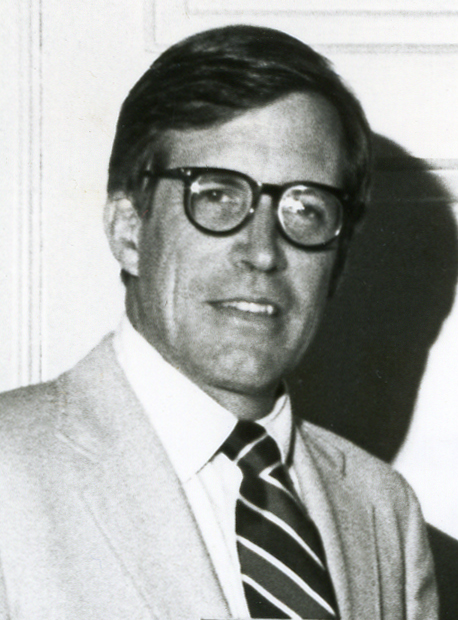

68th Governor of Delaware
- In office January 18, 1977 – January 15, 1985
- Lieutenant: James D. McGinnis; Mike Castle
- Preceded by: Sherman W. Tribbitt
- Succeeded by: Mike Castle

Member of the U.S. House of Representatives from Delaware's at-large district
- In office January 3, 1971 – January 3, 1977
- Preceded by: William Roth
- Succeeded by: Thomas B. Evans Jr.

Member of the Delaware House of Representatives from the 12th district
- In office January 7, 1969 – January 3, 1971
- Preceded by: David Benson
- Succeeded by: William Poulterer

Personal details
- Born: Pierre Samuel du Pont IV; January 22, 1935 Wilmington, Delaware, U.S.
- Died: May 8, 2021 (aged 86) Wilmington, Delaware, U.S.
- Party: Republican
- Spouse: Elise Ravenel Wood
- Children: 4, including Ben
- Relatives: See du Pont family
- Education: Princeton University (BS); Harvard University (LLB)

Military service
- Allegiance: United States
- Branch/service: United States Navy
- Years of service: 1957-1960
- Unit: U.S. Naval Reserve

Pierre Samuel "Pete" du Pont IV (January 22, 1935 – May 8, 2021) was an American attorney, businessman, and politician who served as the 68th governor of Delaware from 1977 to 1985. A member of the Republican Party, he was the United States representative for Delaware's at-large congressional district from 1971 to 1977.

== Early life and family ==
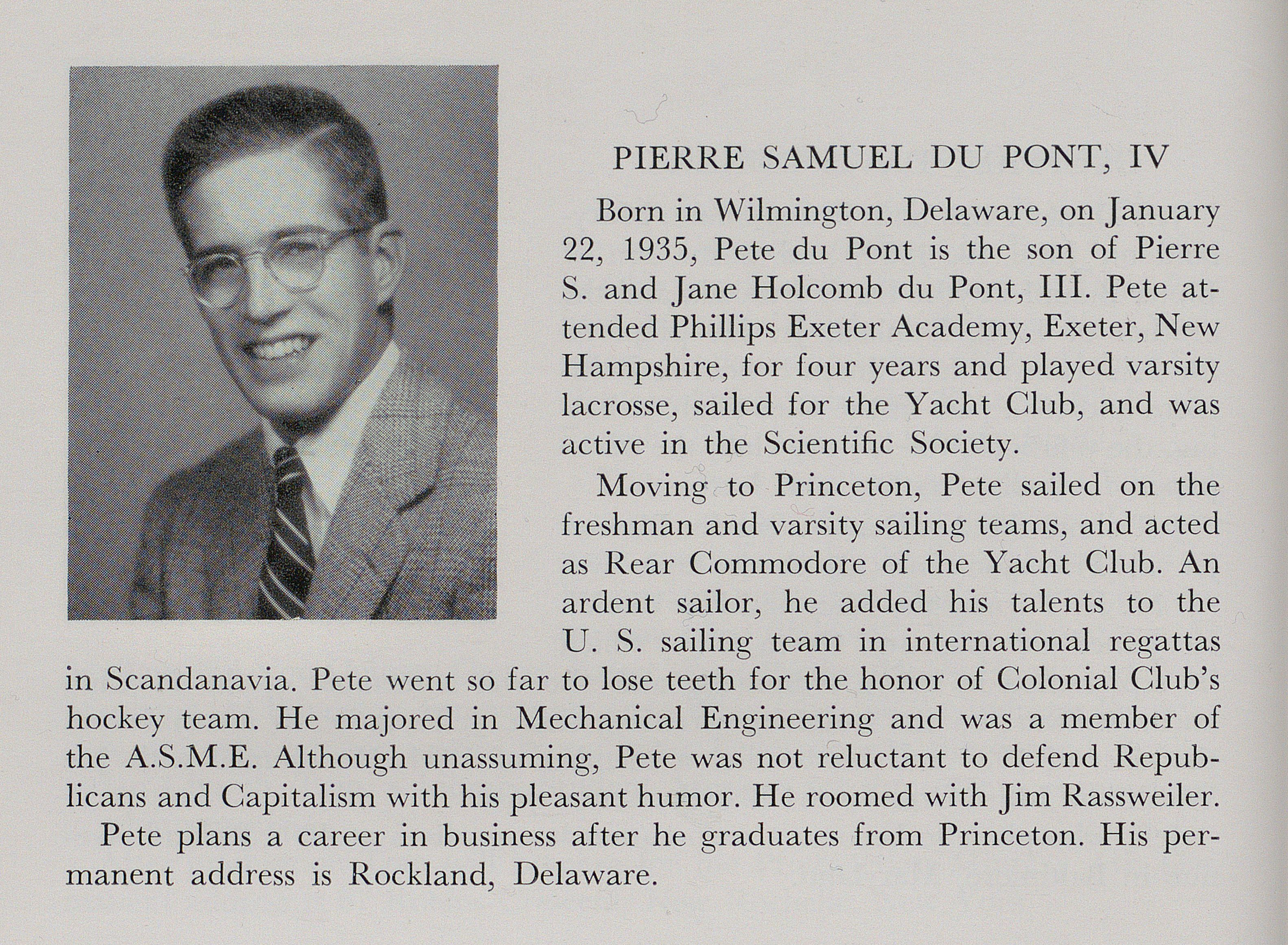
Du Pont in the Princeton University yearbook, 1956

Pierre Samuel du Pont IV was born on January 22, 1935, in Wilmington, Delaware. A member of the Du Pont family, he was the son of Pierre Samuel du Pont III and Jane Holcomb du Pont, grandson of Lammot du Pont II, and great nephew of Pierre S. du Pont, the developer of Longwood Gardens. After education at Phillips Exeter Academy, Princeton University, and Harvard Law School, he served in the U.S. Naval Reserve (Seabees) from 1957 until 1960. He was married to Elise Ravenel Wood and has four children, Elise, Pierre V, Ben, and Eleuthère.

== Professional and political career ==
From 1963 until 1970 du Pont was employed by E.I. du Pont de Nemours and Co. In 1968, he was elected unopposed to the 12th district seat in the Delaware House of Representatives, which he held until 1971. He seriously considered a bid for a United States Senate seat in 1972 (eventually won by Democrat Joe Biden), and initially faced a likely primary election against former U.S. Representative Harry G. Haskell Jr. He then bowed out in accordance with the wish of Republican leaders, including President Richard Nixon, to have a reluctant incumbent U.S. Senator J. Caleb Boggs seek a third term.

=== U.S. House of Representatives ===
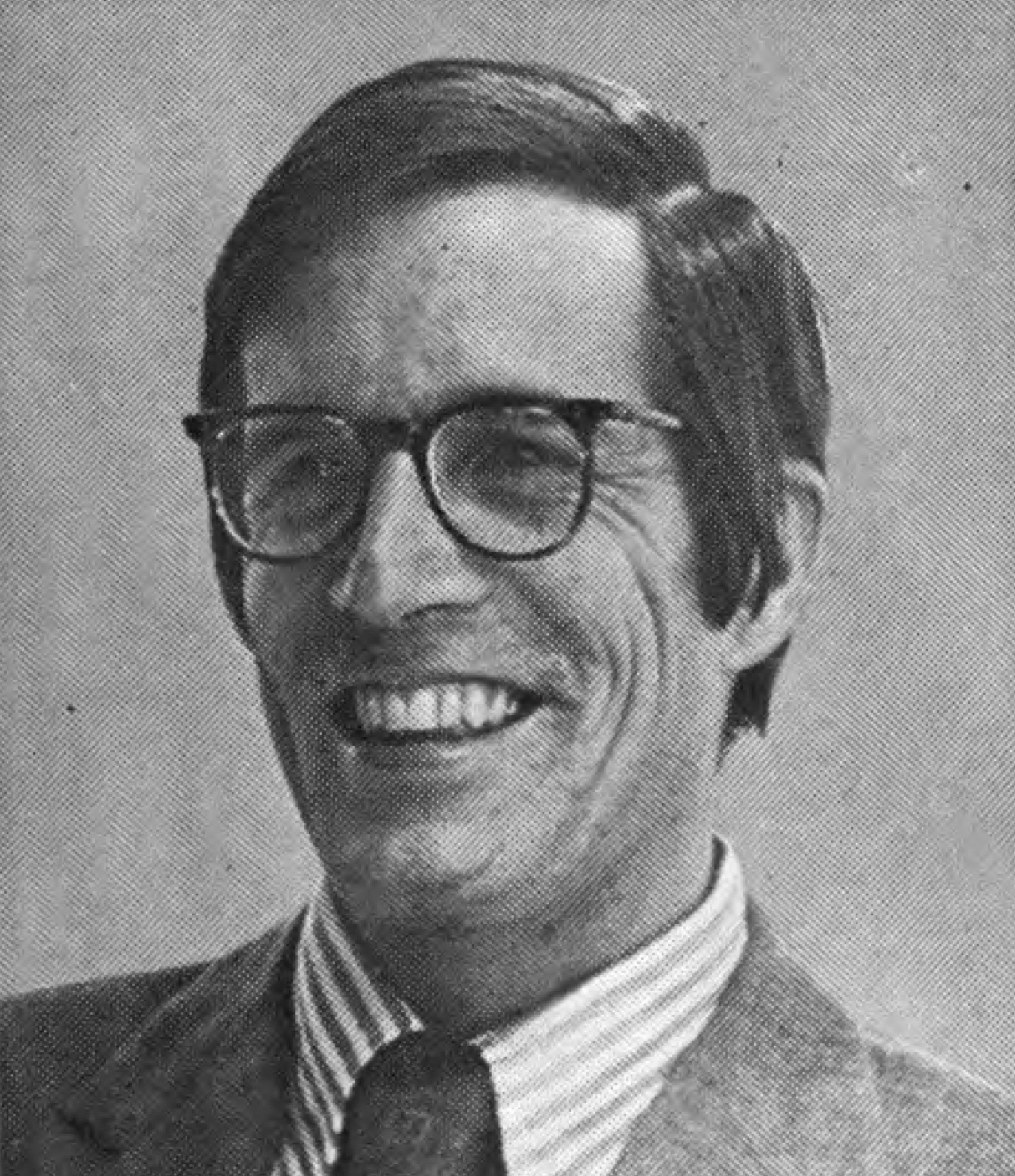
Du Pont as a U.S. Representative

In 1970 du Pont was elected to the U.S. House of Representatives, defeating Democrat John D. Daniello, a New Castle County Councilman and labor leader. He won election to the U.S. House of Representatives two more times, defeating Democrats Norma Handloff in 1972 and University of Delaware professor James R. Soles in 1974. In Congress, du Pont supported an attempt to limit presidential authority through the War Powers Act of 1973, but was one of the last to remain loyal to U.S. President Richard M. Nixon during the impeachment process.

=== Governor of Delaware ===
Du Pont did not seek another term in the U.S. House of Representatives and instead ran for Governor of Delaware in 1976, defeating incumbent Democratic Governor Sherman W. Tribbitt by 33,051 votes. He was re-elected to a second term as governor in 1980, defeating Democratic State House leader William J. Gordy by 94,787 votes, and served from January 18, 1977, until January 15, 1985.

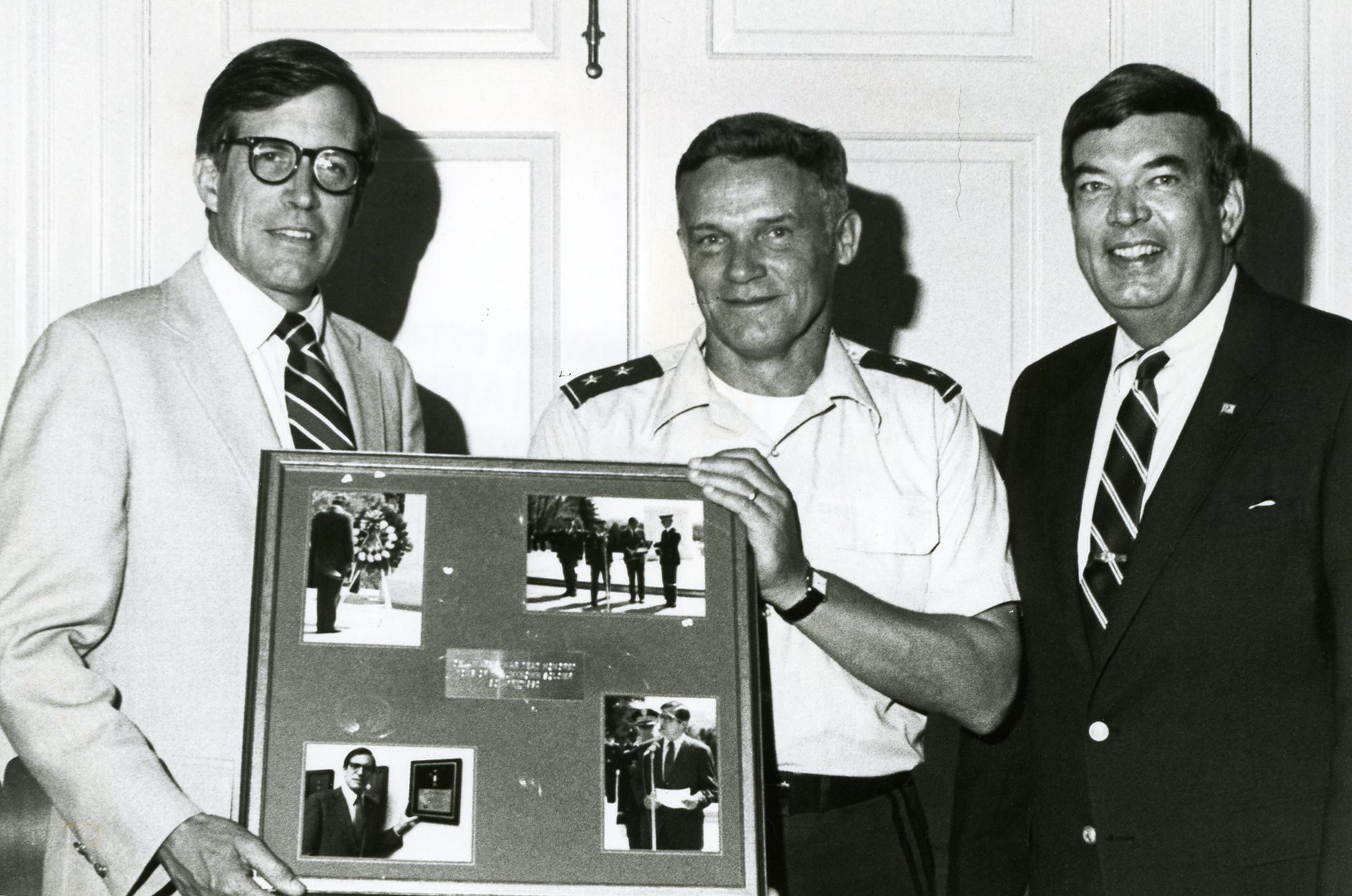
Governor du Pont with Adjutant General of Delaware National Guard

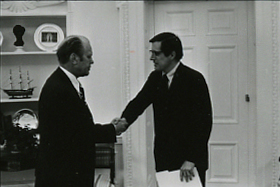
Du Pont greeting President Gerald Ford in 1975

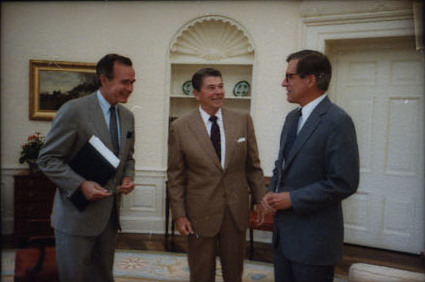
Du Pont with President Ronald Reagan and Vice President George H. W. Bush in 1983

As Governor, du Pont signed into law two income tax reduction measures and a constitutional amendment that restrained future tax increases and limited government spending. The Wilmington News Journal praised these policies, saying that du Pont "revived [the] business climate and set the stage for [Delaware's] prosperity". In 1979, he founded the nonprofit "Jobs for Delaware Graduates", an employment counseling and job placement program for high school seniors not bound for college. This program was the model for other programs currently functioning in many states and foreign countries.

In 1981, Du Pont helped establish the credit card industry in Delaware, in a race against South Dakota, which the year before had abolished its usury law limiting the interest rates that banks can charge consumers for credit. At the time, du Pont's cousin Nathan Hayward III advocated that tiny Delaware aspire to become the "financial Luxembourg of America" – a tax haven for corporations, yacht owners, and credit card companies permitted to charge unlimited interest. Former Du Pont Chairman Irving S. Shapiro, then a lobbyist for Citicorp, helped Gov. du Pont pass the Financial Center Development Act in 1981 with the cooperation of the leadership of both parties and others in state and local government. Intended to attract two New York state banks that would hire at least 1,000 employees, the law eventually drew more than thirty banks to Delaware, creating 43,000 new finance-related jobs and leading the state away from its previous dependence on the chemical industry in general and the Du Pont Company in particular.

Delaware General Assembly (sessions while Governor)
Year	Assembly	Senate Majority	President pro tempore	House Majority	Speaker
1977–1978	129th	Democratic	Richard S. Cordrey	Democratic	Kenneth W. Boulden; John P. Ferguson
1979–1980	130th	Democratic	Richard S. Cordrey	Republican	Robert W. Riddagh
1981–1982	131st	Democratic	Richard S. Cordrey	Republican	Charles L. Hebner
1983–1984	132nd	Democratic	Richard S. Cordrey	Democratic	Orlando J. George Jr.

=== Presidential aspirations ===
With his second and final term as governor expiring in 1985, du Pont, as the dominant Delaware politician, was widely expected to challenge the popular incumbent Democratic U.S. Senator and future President, Joe Biden, but du Pont had little interest in legislative politics and declined to run, preparing instead for a long shot bid for the Republican U.S. presidential nomination in the 1988 election. (His wife, Elise, ran for the U.S. Congressional seat that he had previously held in 1984, but lost to incumbent Democrat Tom Carper.) He declared his intent on September 16, 1986, before anyone else. Biden also sought his party's nomination but dropped out of the race after a plagiarism scandal.

Running in the 1988 Republican presidential primaries, du Pont presented an unconventional program. As described by Celia Cohen in her book, Only in Delaware, du Pont "wanted to reform Social Security by offering recipients private savings options in exchange for a corresponding reduction in government benefits. He proposed phasing out government subsidies for farmers. He said he would wean welfare clients off their benefits and get them into the workforce, even if government had to provide entry-level jobs to get them started. He suggested students be subjected to mandatory, random drug tests with those who flunked losing their drivers [sic] licenses." After finishing next to last in the New Hampshire primary, du Pont exited the race.

=== Later career ===
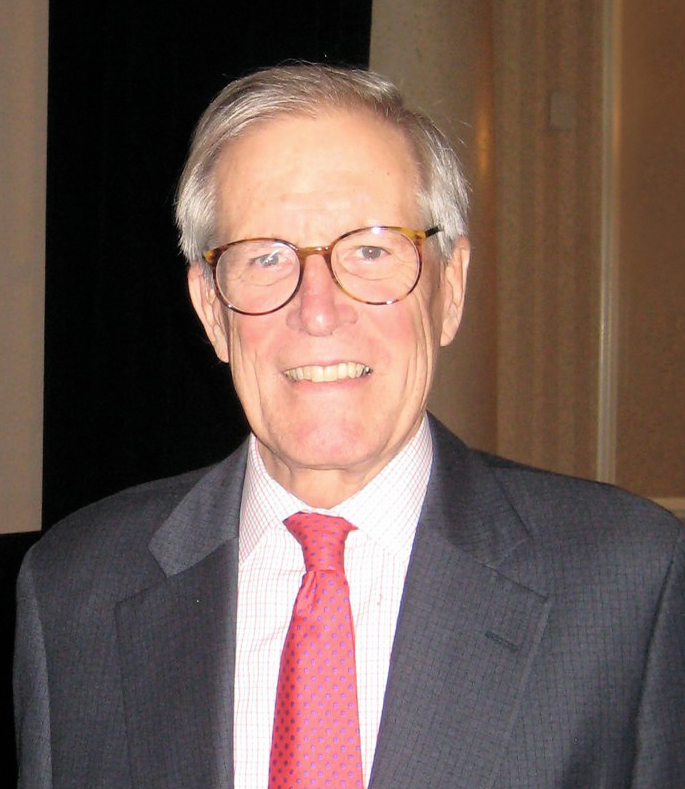
Du Pont in 2011

In 1984, du Pont served as chairman of the Education Commission of the States, a national organization of educators dedicated to improving all facets of American education. He also served as chairman of the Hudson Institute from 1985 until 1987 and the National Review Institute from 1994 until 1997.

Du Pont was the chairman of the board for the National Center for Policy Analysis, a think tank based in Dallas, Texas; he was a retired director with the Wilmington, Delaware law firm of Richards, Layton, and Finger, and until May 2014, he wrote the monthly Outside the Box column for the Wall Street Journal.

== Death ==
Du Pont died at his home in Wilmington, on May 8, 2021, following a long illness.

== Electoral history ==
Public Offices
Office	Type	Location	Began office	Ended office	notes
State Representative	Legislature	Dover	January 14, 1969	January 3, 1971	
U.S. Representative	Legislature	Washington	January 3, 1971	January 3, 1973	
U.S. Representative	Legislature	Washington	January 3, 1973	January 3, 1975	
U.S. Representative	Legislature	Washington	January 3, 1975	January 3, 1977	
Governor	Executive	Dover	January 18, 1977	January 20, 1981	
Governor	Executive	Dover	January 20, 1981	January 15, 1985	

Delaware General Assembly service
Dates	Assembly	Chamber	Majority	Governor	Committees	District
1969–1970	125th	State House	Republican	Russell W. Peterson		New Castle 12th

United States Congressional service
Dates	Congress	Chamber	Majority	President	Committees	Class/District
1971–1973	92nd	U.S. House	Democratic	Richard M. Nixon		at-large
1973–1975	93rd	U.S. House	Democratic	Richard M. Nixon; Gerald R. Ford		at-large
1975–1977	94th	U.S. House	Democratic	Gerald R. Ford		at-large

Election results
Year	Office	Election	Subject	Party	Votes	%	Opponent	Party	Votes	%
1970	U.S. Representative	General	Pierre S. du Pont IV	Republican	86,125	54%	John D. Daniello	Democratic	71,429	46%
1972	U.S. Representative	General	Pierre S. du Pont IV	Republican	141,237	63%	Norma Handloft	Democratic	83,230	37%
1974	U.S. Representative	General	Pierre S. du Pont IV	Republican	93,826	58%	James R. Soles	Democratic	63,490	40%
1976	Governor	General	Pierre S. du Pont IV	Republican	130,531	57%	Sherman W. Tribbitt	Democratic	97,480	42%
1980	Governor	General	Pierre S. du Pont IV	Republican	159,004	71%	William J. Gordy	Democratic	64,217	29%

== Sources ==
- Koplinski, Brad (2000). Hats in the ring : conversations with presidential candidates. Presidential Publishing. ISBN 0-9678702-3-2. OCLC 44945022.

Delaware House of Representatives
Preceded by David Benson	Member of the Delaware House of Representatives from the 12th district 1969–1971	Succeeded by William Poulterer
U.S. House of Representatives
Preceded by William Roth	Member of the U.S. House of Representatives from Delaware's at-large congressional district 1971–1977	Succeeded by Thomas B. Evans Jr.
Party political offices
Preceded by Russell W. Peterson	Republican nominee for Governor of Delaware; 1976, 1980	Succeeded by Mike Castle
Political offices
Preceded by Sherman W. Tribbitt	Governor of Delaware; 1977–1985	Succeeded by Mike Castle
