= W. Neal Moerschel =

American politician

Member of the Delaware House of Representatives from the 31st district
- In office 1969–1973
- Preceded by: Norman A. Eskridge
- Succeeded by: Hudson E. Gruwell

Personal details
- Born: December 24, 1930
- Died: September 6, 2022 (aged 91) Rehoboth Beach, Delaware, U.S.
- Party: Republican
- Education: Maryland State Teachers College; Johns Hopkins University

W. Neal Moerschel (December 24, 1930 – September 6, 2022) was an American politician. He served as a Republican member for the 31st district of the Delaware House of Representatives.

== Life and career ==
Moerschel attended Maryland State Teachers College and Johns Hopkins University.

Moerschel served in the Delaware House of Representatives from 1969 to 1973.

Moerschel died on September 6, 2022 at his home in Rehoboth Beach, Delaware, at the age of 91.
