= Russell W. Peterson =

American scientist and politician (1916–2011)

Russell Peterson
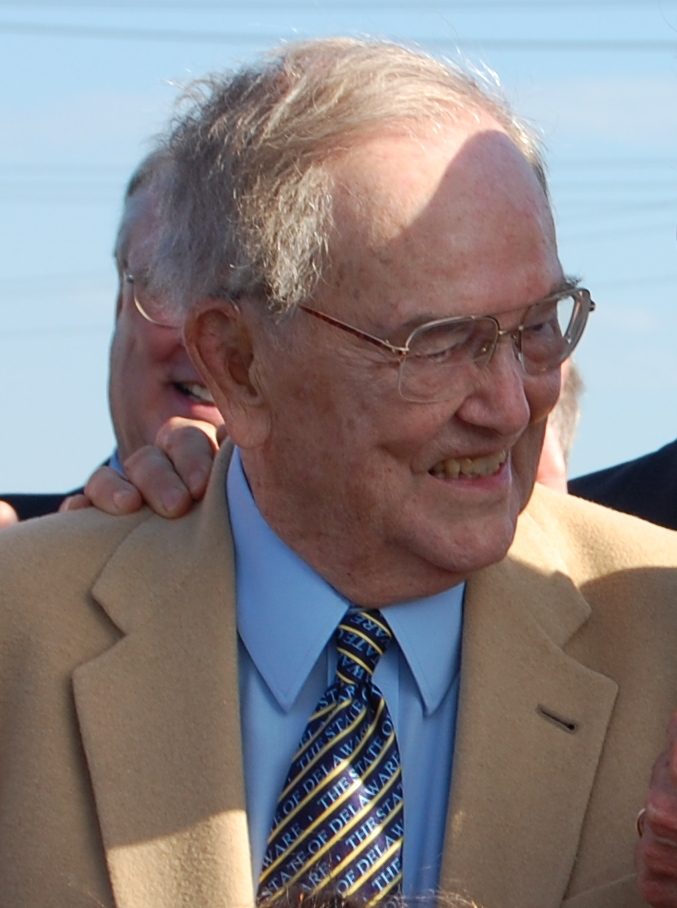

Chair of the Council on Environmental Quality
- In office 1973–1976
- President: Richard Nixon; Gerald Ford
- Preceded by: Russell E. Train
- Succeeded by: John A. Busterud

66th Governor of Delaware
- In office January 21, 1969 – January 16, 1973
- Lieutenant: Eugene Bookhammer
- Preceded by: Charles Terry
- Succeeded by: Sherman W. Tribbitt

Personal details
- Born: Russell Wilbur Peterson; October 3, 1916 Portage, Wisconsin, U.S.
- Died: February 21, 2011 (aged 94) Centreville, Delaware, U.S.
- Party: Republican (before 1996); Democratic (after 1996)
- Spouses: Lillian Turner (m. 1937; died 1994) June Jenkins (m. 1995)
- Education: University of Wisconsin, Madison (BS, MS, PhD)

Russell Wilbur Peterson (October 3, 1916 – February 21, 2011) was an American scientist and politician from Wilmington, Delaware. He served as Governor of Delaware as a member of the Republican Party. An influential environmentalist, he served as chairman of the Council on Environmental Quality and president of the National Audubon Society.

== Early life and family ==
Peterson was born in Portage, Wisconsin, the son of Emma (Anthony) and Johan Anton Peterson. The eighth of nine children, his father was an immigrant from Sweden who worked as a bartender and barber. Peterson attended the University of Wisconsin where he received a B.S. in 1938, working as a dishwasher in the chemistry lab to pay the bills and a Ph.D. in Chemistry in 1942. In 1937 he married Lillian Turner, with whom he had four children: R. Glen, Peter J., Kristin P. Havill and Elin. Lillian died in 1994. He married his second wife, June Jenkins, who had been recently widowed, in 1995. He was a Unitarian Universalist.

At Wisconsin, Peterson was elected to Phi Beta Kappa society.

== Professional and political career ==
After graduate school, Peterson was recruited by DuPont to work as a research chemist at its Experimental Station in Wilmington. For over 26 years he held prominent jobs in research, manufacturing and sales, and finally in corporate management, becoming director of research and development in 1963.

All the while, Peterson had become a well-known civic activist from suburban New Castle County. He had been involved in the "New Day for Delaware" attempt at governmental reform in the Boggs administration and had organized an effort at prison reform known as the "Three-S Citizen's Campaign," salvage people, save dollars, and shrink the crime rate. His leadership skills inspired Henry B. du Pont to appoint him to the executive committee of the Greater Wilmington Development Council. He was put in charge of the Neighborhood Improvement Program, tasked with solving poverty in the black community. By 1968 Delaware had experienced rioting following the murder of Martin Luther King Jr., and National Guard troops were still on the streets of Wilmington on the orders of the conservative Democratic Governor, Charles L. Terry Jr. Peterson seemed to have a fresh, progressive approach for addressing these and other issues and was drafted by Republican state leaders to run for governor.

== Governor of Delaware ==
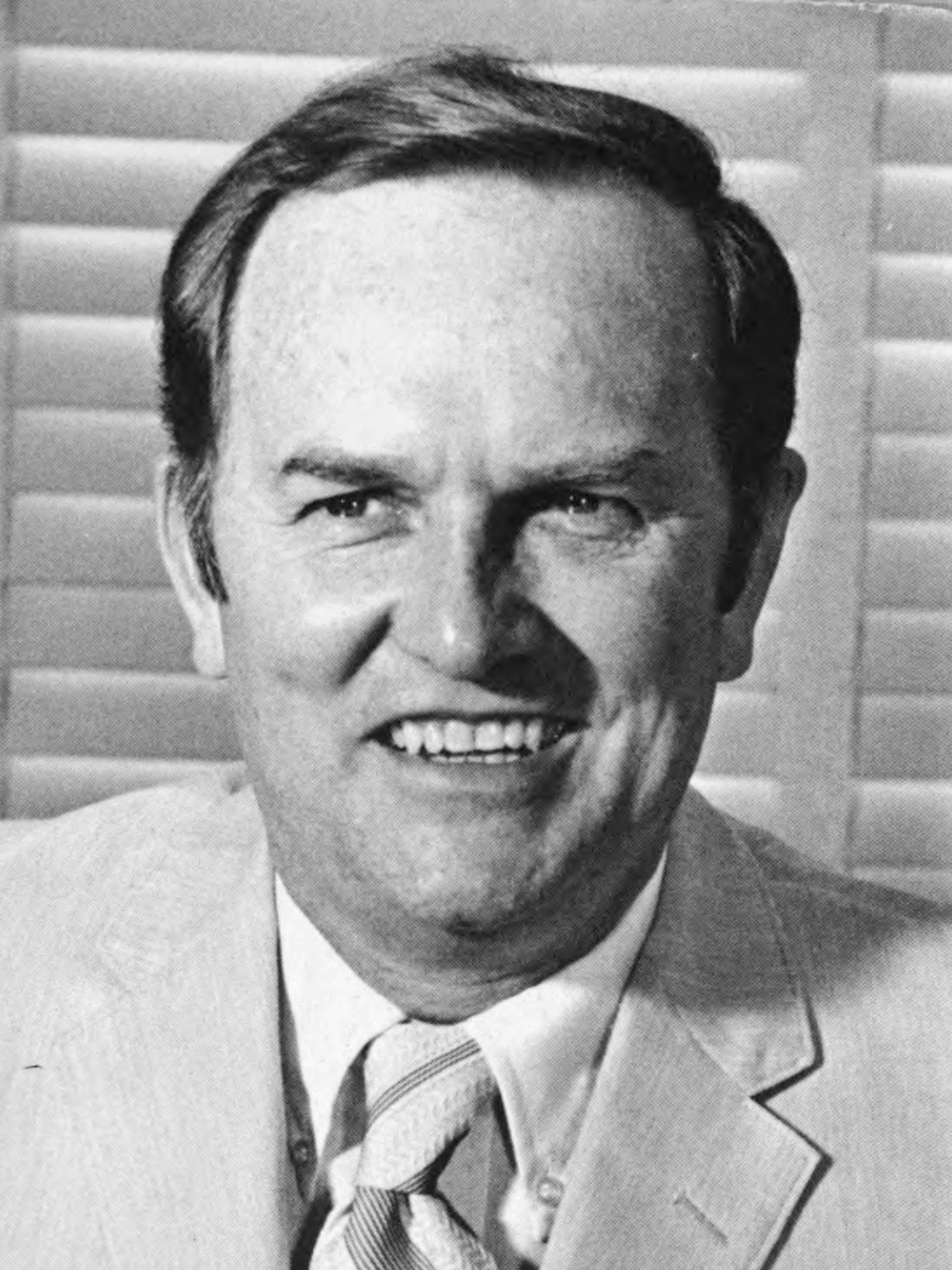
Peterson while as Governor of Delaware, c. 1971-1972.

Peterson was elected Governor of Delaware in 1968, defeating incumbent Governor Charles L. Terry Jr. by 2,114 votes. His first act was to remove the National Guard from Wilmington. His administration was one that enacted several substantial changes, with perhaps the biggest change being the successful implementation of the old "New Day for Delaware" plan that transformed the organization of state government. Delaware's executive departments had been run by commissions, appointed by the governor, but with considerable policy independence, and overlapping terms. As a result, the governor had control over his departments only through persuasion and the budget. The newly enacted law provided for an eleven-person cabinet organization, with department leadership provided by persons serving at the pleasure of the governor. In all, Peterson eliminated 100 commissions and boards. Neither Peterson nor his successor, Sherman W. Tribbitt, were fully able to take advantage of this change, but their successors all made it one of the foundations of the present Delaware state government.

Peterson was also a dedicated environmentalist and the guiding force behind the Coastal Zone Act of 1971. This act protected Delaware's inland bays and waterways by banning heavy industry from a two-mile-wide strip of Delaware's 115 mile coastline, about 20% of the state. The major consequence of the Act was preventing Shell from building a $200m oil refinery. This piece of legislation has since been used by other states to protect their shorelines. During his tenure as governor Peterson chaired the Education Commission of the States from 1970 to 1971. When Maurice Stans, the Secretary of Commerce under Richard Nixon complained to Peterson that the Act harmed America's security and prosperity, Peterson listed a dozen ways in which companies could continue their work without harming Delaware's coastline. The Act was unsuccessfully challenged in court, and Peterson led the environmental movement in Delaware by sporting a badge on his lapel that said, "To Hell with Shell!"

These were a breathtaking number of changes for normally conservative Delaware – Peterson appointed the first person of color, Arva Jackson, to the University of Delaware's board of trustees, insisted on the hiring of black people to the State Police, pressed for the state's open housing law and relaxed abortion laws. In 1972, Delaware became the last state to outlaw flogging as a form of punishment, removing Red Hannah, America's last whipping post.

Meanwhile, in spite of warnings, Peterson seemed to be unaware of growing financial problems for the state. Finally, in June 1971, Peterson admitted he had made revenue miscalculations resulting in a $5 million deficit. The mistake opened the door to opponents of the other changes to unleash a barrage of criticism. As a result, when he sought a second term the next year, he won the Republican primary by 8% of the vote over former Lieutenant Governor & Governor David P. Buckson. In the general election, he was defeated by Democratic former Lieutenant Governor and then State House minority leader Sherman W. Tribbitt by 7,691 votes after announcing an unexpected tax increase in the middle of the campaign. He left office with Delaware enjoying a budget surplus.

Delaware General Assembly (sessions while Governor)
Year	Assembly	Senate Majority	President pro tempore	House Majority	Speaker
1969–1970	125th	Republican	Reynolds du Pont	Republican	George C. Hering, III
1971–1972	126th	Republican	Reynolds du Pont	Republican	William L. Frederick

== Later career ==
Upon leaving office in January 1973, Peterson was recruited by Nelson Rockefeller to spearhead establishment of what later became known as the Commission on Critical Choices for Americans. In December of 1973, Rockefeller championed Peterson's appointment, by President Richard Nixon, as Chairman of the Council on Environmental Quality. Peterson served at CEQ from 1973 to 1976, leading a task force on the elimination of chlorofluorocarbons and helping to shape environmental reviews as mandated by the National Environmental Policy Act. In 1976, Peterson left CEQ to lead a new international citizens' action group, New Directions, which was modeled on Common Cause. Just over a year later, Peterson left New Directions to become director of the Congressional Office of Technology Assessment (OTA).

Every time something wonderful has happened when I was president and since then in the field of environmental quality in this country or on a global basis, Russ Peterson has been intimately involved in it.

— Jimmy Carter, at the University of Delaware, 1993

A keen bird watcher, Peterson took up the hobby after taking his son to the Everglades in 1954 and identified over 1,000 birds during his life. Peterson served as the president of the National Audubon Society from 1979 to 1985. He fought Ronald Reagan's attempts to weaken environmental regulations, pushed the society beyond its traditional remit into areas like energy policy, toxic waste and population control. He hired more scientists, started an environmental curriculum for school children and got Ted Turner to finance the TV series The World of Audubon, narrated by Robert Redford, amongst others.

Ever the scientist and always the humanist, you have woven these twin passions into a lifetime of dedication to protecting this earth. Whatever the job, whatever the administration, you have put the environment ahead of politics, supporting pro-environmentalists wherever you have found them.

— League of Conservation Voters, 1995

Peterson served as a visiting professor at Dartmouth College in 1985, Carleton College in 1986, and the University of Wisconsin–Madison in 1987. He also served as president of the International Council for Bird Preservation, as a principal officer in three international environmental organisations, worked for the United Nations on various activities and as chairman of the Center on the Long-Term Biological Consequences of Nuclear War, working with Carl Sagan, Paul R. Ehrlich and Peter Raven to employ scientists to inform world leaders of the dangers of nuclear weapons. In October 1996 Peterson switched his party affiliation to the Democratic Party, after endorsing Democrats in presidential elections since 1988.

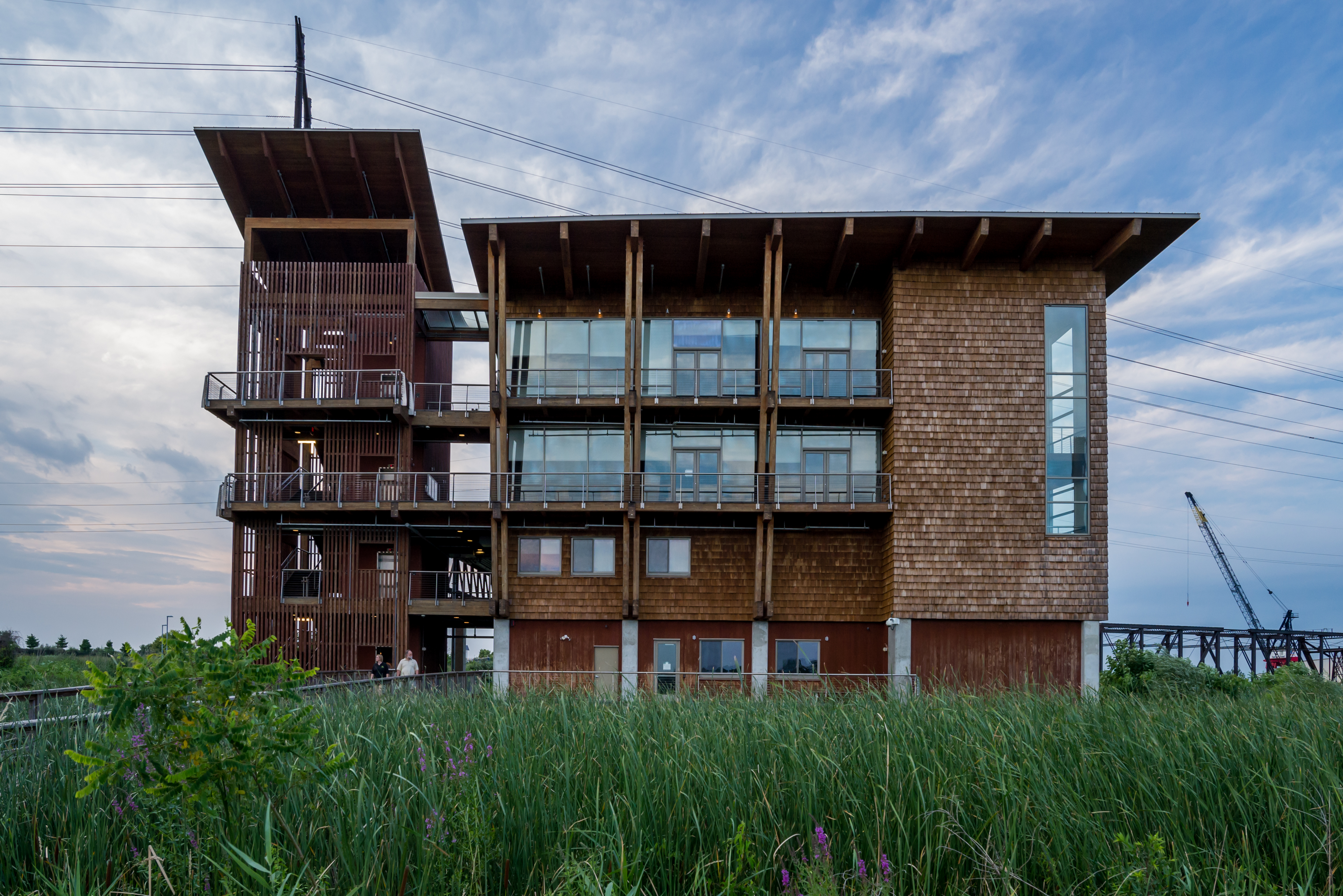
DuPont Environmental Education Center at the Russell W. Peterson Urban Wildlife Refuge

In 1971 the National Wildlife Federation gave Peterson the Conservationist of the Year award. In 1974, Peterson received the Charles Lathrop Parsons Award for public service from the American Chemical Society. In 1982, Russell W. Peterson was honored to be selected as the Swedish-American of the year by the Swedish Council of America (previously the Vasa Order of America). In 1984 he was given the Robert Marshall Award by the Wilderness Society. In 1995, the League of Conservation Voters awarded him its lifetime achievement award. In 2007 he was inducted into the Wisconsin Conservation Hall of Fame.

The Russell W. Peterson Urban Wildlife Refuge, just outside Wilmington, has been named in his honor.

In April 2008, a small ship was rechristened "Russell W. Peterson." The ship, owned by Aqua Survey Inc. was used for the study of migratory bird routes. However, on May 12, 2008, the "Russell W. Peterson" was destroyed in a storm off the Delaware coast, killing one of its two crew members.

Peterson suffered a stroke on the morning of Monday, February 21, 2011, and died at 8:10pm that evening at home. He was survived by his wife, four children, seventeen grandchildren and sixteen great-grandchildren.

== Almanac ==
Elections are held the first Tuesday after November 1. The governor takes office the third Tuesday of January and has a four-year term.

Public Offices
Office	Type	Location	Began office	Ended office	notes'
Governor	Executive	Dover	January 21, 1969	January 16, 1973	

Election results
Year	Office	Election	Subject	Party	Votes	%	Opponent	Party	Votes	%
1968	Governor	General	Russell W. Peterson	Republican	104,474	51%	Charles L. Terry, Jr.	Democratic	102,360	49%
1972	Governor	Primary	Russell W. Peterson	Republican	23,929	54%	David P. Buckson	Republican	20,138	46%
1972	Governor	General	Russell W. Peterson	Republican	109,583	48%	Sherman W. Tribbitt	Democratic	117,274	51%

== See also ==
- Delaware lunar sample displays

== Other sources ==
- Boyer, William W. (2000). Governing Delaware. Newark, Delaware: University of Delaware Press. ISBN 1-892142-23-6.
- Hoffecker, Carol E. (2004). Democracy in Delaware. Wilmington, Delaware: Cedar Tree Books. ISBN 1-892142-23-6.
- Martin, Roger A. (1984). History of Delaware Through its Governors. Wilmington, Delaware: McClafferty Press.
- Munroe, John A. (1993). History of Delaware. Newark, Delaware: University of Delaware Press. ISBN 0-87413-493-5.
- Peterson, Russell W. (1999). Rebel with a conscience. Newark, Delaware: University of Delaware Press. p. 416 p. ISBN 0-87413-681-4.
- Peterson, Russell W. (2003). Patriots, stand up!. Wilmington, Delaware: Cedar Tree Books. p. 76 p. ISBN 1-892142-20-1.

Party political offices
Preceded by David P. Buckson	Republican nominee for Governor of Delaware; 1968, 1972	Succeeded by Pete du Pont
Political offices
Preceded by Charles Terry	Governor of Delaware; 1969–1973	Succeeded by Sherman W. Tribbitt
Preceded by Russell E. Train	Chair of the Council on Environmental Quality; 1973–1976	Succeeded by John A. Busterud
