= Charles L. Terry Jr. =

American judge and politician (1900–1970)

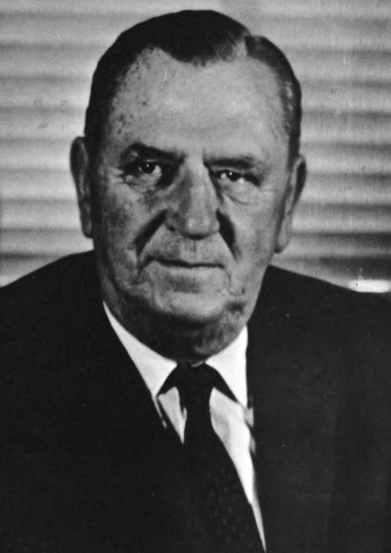

65th Governor of Delaware
- In office January 19, 1965 – January 21, 1969
- Lieutenant: Sherman W. Tribbitt
- Preceded by: Elbert N. Carvel
- Succeeded by: Russell W. Peterson

Chief Justice of the Delaware Supreme Court
- In office May 1963 – August 19, 1964
- Appointed by: Elbert N. Carvel
- Preceded by: Clarence A. Southerland
- Succeeded by: Daniel F. Wolcott

Justice of the Delaware Supreme Court
- In office July 23, 1962 – May 1963
- Appointed by: Elbert N. Carvel

Associate Justice of the Delaware Superior Court
- In office December 7, 1938 – April 29, 1957
- Appointed by: Richard McMullen

Secretary of State of Delaware
- In office 1937–1938
- Governor: Richard McMullen
- Preceded by: Walter Dent Smith
- Succeeded by: Josiah Marvel Jr.

Personal details
- Born: Charles Layman Terry Jr. September 17, 1900 Camden, Delaware, U.S.
- Died: February 6, 1970 (aged 69) Dover, Delaware, U.S.
- Party: Democratic
- Spouse: Jessica Irby
- Education: University of Virginia
- Profession: lawyer

Charles Layman Terry Jr. (September 17, 1900 – February 6, 1970) was an American lawyer and politician from Dover, in Kent County, Delaware. He was a member of the Democratic Party and served as Chief Justice of the Delaware Supreme Court as well as Governor of Delaware.

== Early life and family ==
Terry was born at Camden, Delaware, son of Charles Layman Sr. and Elizabeth Maxon Terry. He attended Wesley College and the University of Virginia, receiving his law degree from Washington and Lee University. At Virginia, Terry was initiated into the Psi chapter of the Phi Sigma Kappa fraternity. Terry married Jessica Irby and had one child, Charles III. They were members of Christ Episcopal Church in Dover.

== Professional and judicial career ==
Terry was admitted to the Delaware Bar in 1924 and practiced in Dover, serving as attorney for the Kent County Levy Court and the Delaware General Assembly. In 1936, he was appointed Delaware Secretary of State. He then served as a judge of the Delaware Superior Court from December 7, 1938, until April 29, 1957, and, as President Judge from that date, until July 23, 1962. He was then appointed justice of the Delaware Supreme Court and in May 1963 became its Chief Justice, serving until 1964.

Henry R. Horsey and William Duffy in their article on the Delaware Courts described Terry's tenure as Judge as follows: "In his twenty-five years on the bench, Judge Terry, or just plain "Charlie" as he preferred to be called, was, through his knowledge of the legislative process and influence with the General Assembly, instrumental in obtaining numerous judicial reforms. These included an increase in judicial salaries and significant improvements in the judicial pension system, establishment of full-time Courts of Common Pleas in Kent and Sussex Counties, enduring support for the creation of the present separate Supreme Court of Delaware and extensive improvements and enlargements of the judicial facilities in both the Public Building in Wilmington and the Kent County Courthouse.

== Governor of Delaware ==
Terry had political ambitions and with the support of the incumbent governor, Elbert N. Carvel, resigned as chief justice. He was elected as Governor of Delaware in 1964, defeating former governor, Republican David P. Buckson, by 5,423 votes

As governor the former Justice instituted a major reform of the magistrate courts or justice of the peace court system, transforming a "court once ridden with politics and favoritism" into what eventually became "an efficient system of salaried, full-time judges sitting in a courtroom setting and conducting proceedings under uniform written rules of procedure." In particular, the practice of paying fees to these officials based on the number of cases was ended, and they came to receive a set salary. A second change occurred with the purchase of Woodburn, the official Governor's House. Governor Terry and his family were the first occupants. Terry's other major initiative was the founding of the Delaware Technical and Community College, with a campus in each county. The former judge was proving to be a very effective governor; as deft, charming, and authoritative as appropriate.

However, Delaware could not escape the key issues of the 1960s, particularly the issue of racial equality. In the Delaware General Assembly there were lengthy debates about equal housing, but no significant legislation could be agreed upon. In the streets of Wilmington, a few nights of shootings in 1967 resulted in a curfew and a liquor sales ban. Terry went to the Delaware General Assembly and demanded and received the authority to declare a state of emergency with crowd control powers. He immediately put the emergency into effect and although the violence was ended in a week, continued the emergency for another month. Then, a year later, real problems came with the murder of Martin Luther King Jr. on April 4, 1968. A few days later Wilmington exploded in two days of self-destructive rioting, looting and burning. Terry again responded with an emergency declaration and sent the National Guard in to assist the city police. A week later, when the situation seemed under control, the mayor lifted the curfew and requested the withdrawal of the National Guard. Believing there was more violence to come, Terry refused. It was not until Terry left office, eight months later, that the National Guard was removed from the streets of Wilmington. While all this was simmering, students at Delaware State College in Dover shouted down Terry during a speech and briefly occupied the administration building. Terry responded by closing down the school for a month. Terry had become known by some as "The Great Divider."

Terry was not without considerable support for his notable accomplishments and for the way he handled the violence in Wilmington. He campaigned for a second term and only narrowly lost, believing an October heart attack and a rezoning dispute in Sussex County cost him the election. However, 1968 was a Republican sweep, and Russell W. Peterson, a chemist from New Castle County, was able to defeat him by 2,114 votes, undoubtedly helped by a large number of Democrats in Wilmington who were seeking new leadership to end the tension and violence.

Delaware General Assembly (sessions while Governor)
Year	Assembly	Senate Majority	President pro tempore	House Majority	Speaker
1965–1966	123rd	Democratic	Curtis W. Steen	Democratic	Harold T. Bockman
1967–1968	124th	Democratic	Calvin R. McCullough	Republican	George C. Herring, III

== Death and legacy ==
Terry died at Dover and is buried there in the Christ Episcopal Church Cemetery. The Charles L. Terry Campus of the Delaware Technical and Community College at Dover is named in his honor.

== Almanac ==
Elections are held the first Tuesday after November 1. The governor takes office the third Tuesday of January and has a four-year term. All judicial positions are appointed by the governor.

Public offices
Office	Type	Location	Began office	Ended office	Notes
Judge	Judiciary	Dover	December 7, 1938	April 29, 1957	Superior Court
President Judge	Judiciary	Dover	April 29, 1957	July 23, 1962	Superior Court
Justice	Judiciary	Dover	July 23, 1962	May 1963	Supreme Court
Chief Justice	Judiciary	Dover	May 1963	August 19, 1964	Supreme Court
Governor	Executive	Dover	January 19, 1965	January 21, 1969	

Election results
Year	Office	Subject	Party	votes	%	Opponent	Party	votes	%
1964	Governor	Charles L. Terry Jr.	Democratic	102,797	51%	David P. Buckson	Republican	97,374	49%
1968	Governor	Charles L. Terry Jr.	Democratic	102,360	49%	Russell W. Peterson	Republican	104,474	51%

Party political offices
Preceded by Elbert N. Carvel	Democratic nominee for Governor of Delaware; 1964, 1968	Succeeded by Sherman W. Tribbitt
Political offices
Preceded by Elbert N. Carvel	Governor of Delaware; 1965–1969	Succeeded by Russell W. Peterson
