= David P. Buckson =

American lawyer and politician (1920–2017)

David Buckson
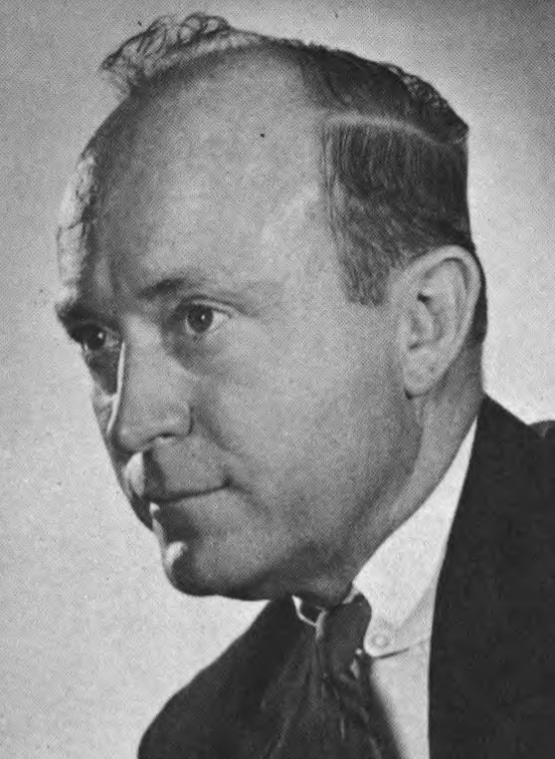

37th Attorney General of Delaware
- In office January 15, 1963 – January 19, 1971
- Governor: Elbert N. Carvel; Charles L. Terry Jr. Russell W. Peterson
- Preceded by: Januar Bove
- Succeeded by: W. Laird Stabler Jr.

63rd Governor of Delaware
- In office December 30, 1960 – January 17, 1961
- Lieutenant: Vacant
- Preceded by: J. Caleb Boggs
- Succeeded by: Elbert Carvel

15th Lieutenant Governor of Delaware
- In office January 15, 1957 – December 30, 1960
- Governor: Caleb Boggs
- Preceded by: John Rollins
- Succeeded by: Eugene Lammot

Personal details
- Born: David Penrose Buckson; July 25, 1920 Townsend, Delaware, U.S.
- Died: January 17, 2017 (aged 96) Milford, Delaware, U.S.
- Party: Republican
- Spouse(s): Betty Savin; Patricia Maloney
- Children: Eric Buckson (son)
- Education: University of Delaware (BA); Pennsylvania State University, Carlisle (LLB)

David Penrose Buckson (July 25, 1920 – January 17, 2017) was an American lawyer and politician from Camden in Kent County, Delaware. A veteran of World War II and a member of the Republican Party, he served as the 15th lieutenant governor of Delaware from 1957 to 1960, as the 63rd governor of Delaware from 1960 to 1961, and as the 37th attorney general of Delaware from 1963 to 1971.

== Early life and family ==
Buckson was born in Townsend, Delaware, the son of Leon and Margaret Hutchison Buckson. He first married Betty Savin in 1945 with whom he had two children, Deborah Gray, and Brian Roth. His second wife was Patricia Maloney, whom he married in 1962 and with whom he had four children, Marlee, David, Eric, and Kent. They were members of the Methodist Church. He graduated from the University of Delaware in 1941 with a commission as a second lieutenant in the U.S. Army. During World War II Buckson served in the South Pacific and attained the rank of major. Afterwards he resumed legal studies, at Dickinson College Law School in Carlisle, Pennsylvania. Buckson is the founder of Dover Downs, opening in 1969 a harness racing track that was also encompassed by the NASCAR race track which began racing the same year. Buckson died on January 17, 2017, at the Delaware Veterans Home in Milford, Delaware.

== Lieutenant Governor and Governor of Delaware ==
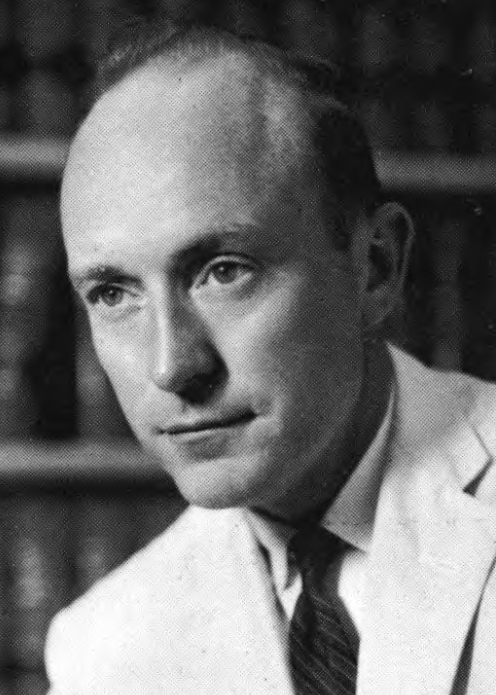
Buckson during his tenure as lieutenant governor

He was appointed a judge in the Court of Common Pleas in 1955. A year later, he was elected lieutenant-governor, defeating Vernon Derrickson. He served one term from January 15, 1957, to December 30, 1960. Near the end of his term, in 1960, he sought the Republican Party nomination for governor, but lost it to John W. Rollins. However, he became governor when Governor J. Caleb Boggs resigned to start his first U.S. Senate term, and served the remaining 18 days of Boggs' second term.

== Professional and political career ==
Buckson was elected Delaware's attorney-general in 1962 and served two terms, from January 15, 1963, to January 19, 1971. He ran for governor again in 1964 but lost to Democratic former Chief Justice Charles L. Terry Jr., and in 1972, when he failed to receive the Republican nomination.

Buckson was later appointed by Governor Sherman W. Tribbitt to be a judge in the Family Court of Delaware.

Buckson was the first Delaware attorney to have offices in more than one county. He was the founder of Dover Downs, a volunteer fireman, a decorated World War II officer, and commander of a National Guard unit. Buckson was also simultaneously city solicitor for the Delaware municipalities of Newark, Middletown, Townsend, Smyrna, Clayton, and Dover.

Buckson died on January 17, 2017, in Milford, at age 96. At the time of his death, he was the oldest living state governor.

Delaware General Assembly (session while Governor)
Year	Assembly	Senate Majority	President pro tempore	House Majority	Speaker
1961	120th	Democratic	Allen J. Cook	Democratic	Sherman W. Tribbitt

Public Offices
Office	Type	Location	Began office	Ended office	notes
Lt. Governor	Executive	Dover	January 15, 1957	December 30, 1960	Delaware
Governor	Executive	Dover	December 30, 1960	January 17, 1961	Delaware
Attorney General	Executive	Dover	January 15, 1963	January 17, 1967	Delaware
Attorney General	Executive	Dover	January 17, 1967	January 19, 1971	Delaware

Election results
Year	Office	Election	Subject	Party	Votes	%	Opponent	Party	Votes	%
1956	Lt. Governor	General	David P. Buckson	Republican	92,254	52%	Vernon B. Derrickson	Democratic	81,121	48%
1962	Attorney General	General	David P. Buckson	Republican	77,666	51%	John Biggs, III	Democratic	75,064	49%
1964	Governor	General	David P. Buckson	Republican	97,374	49%	Charles L. Terry Jr.	Democratic	102,797	51%
1966	Attorney General	General	David P. Buckson	Republican	96,595	59%	Sidney Balick	Democratic	66,848	41%
1972	Governor	Primary	David P. Buckson	Republican	20,138	46%	Russell W. Peterson	Republican	23,929	54%

== Images ==
- Hall of Governors Portrait Gallery; Portrait courtesy of Historical and Cultural Affairs, Dover.

Political offices
Preceded by John Rollins	Lieutenant Governor of Delaware; 1957–1960	Succeeded by Eugene Lammot
Preceded by Caleb Boggs	Governor of Delaware; 1960–1961	Succeeded by Elbert N. Carvel
Party political offices
Preceded by John W. Rollins	Republican nominee for Lieutenant Governor of Delaware; 1956	Succeeded by William Roth
Preceded by John W. Rollins	Republican nominee for Governor of Delaware; 1964	Succeeded by Russell W. Peterson
Legal offices
Preceded by Januar D. Bove Jr.	Attorney General of Delaware; 1963–1971	Succeeded by Laird Stabler
Honorary titles
Preceded by Edgar Whitcomb	Oldest living American governor February 4, 2016 – January 17, 2017	Succeeded by John M. Patterson
