= Eugene Lammot =

American politician (1899–1987)

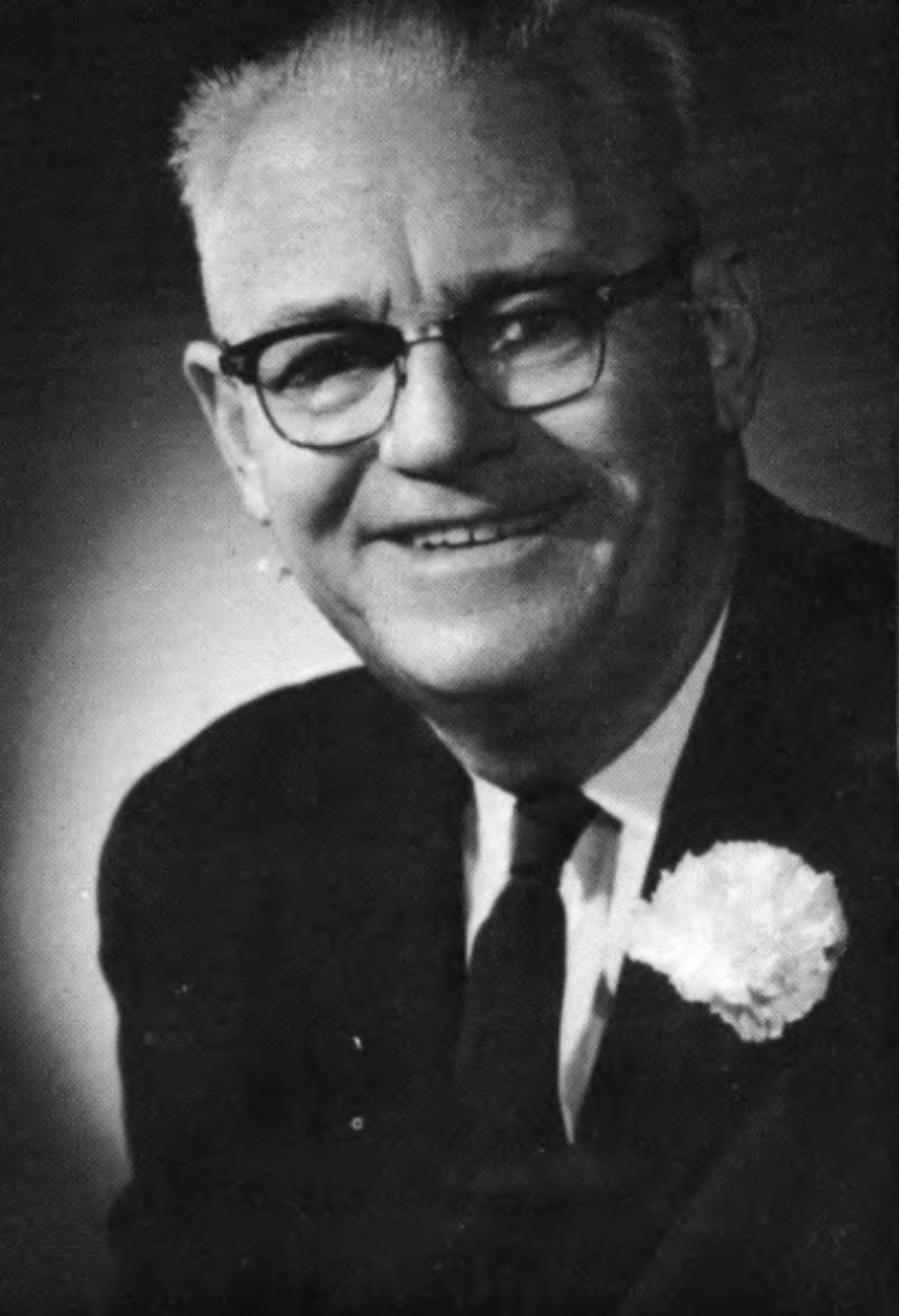
- Lammot in 1963

16th Lieutenant Governor of Delaware
- In office January 17, 1961 – January 19, 1965
- Governor: Elbert N. Carvel
- Preceded by: David P. Buckson
- Succeeded by: Sherman W. Tribbitt

47th Mayor of Wilmington, Delaware
- In office 1957–1960
- Preceded by: August Walz
- Succeeded by: John E. Babiarz

Personal details
- Born: May 22, 1899
- Died: March 2, 1987 (aged 87)
- Party: Democratic

Eugene Lammot (May 22, 1899 – March 2, 1987) was an American politician who served as the 16th Lieutenant Governor of Delaware, from January 17, 1961, to January 19, 1965, under Governor Elbert N. Carvel. He previously served as the 47th mayor of Wilmington, Delaware, from 1957 to 1960.

Party political offices
Preceded by Vernon B. Derrickson	Democratic nominee for Lieutenant Governor of Delaware; 1960	Succeeded by Sherman W. Tribbitt
Political offices
Preceded by David P. Buckson	Lieutenant Governor of Delaware; 1961–1965	Succeeded by Sherman W. Tribbitt
