= Sherman W. Tribbitt =

American politician (1922–2010)

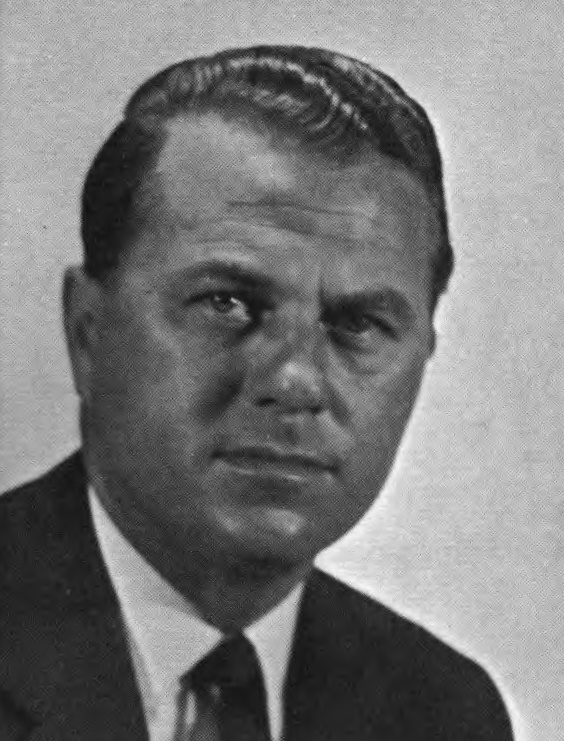

67th Governor of Delaware
- In office January 16, 1973 – January 18, 1977
- Lieutenant: Eugene Bookhammer
- Preceded by: Russell W. Peterson
- Succeeded by: Pete du Pont

17th Lieutenant Governor of Delaware
- In office January 19, 1965 – January 21, 1969
- Governor: Charles L. Terry, Jr.
- Preceded by: Eugene Lammot
- Succeeded by: Eugene Bookhammer

Member of the Delaware House of Representatives
- In office January 8, 1957 - January 12, 1965; January 12, 1971 - January 9, 1973

Personal details
- Born: Sherman Willard Tribbitt; November 9, 1922 Denton, Maryland, U.S.
- Died: August 14, 2010 (aged 87) Milford, Delaware, U.S.
- Party: Democratic
- Spouse: Jeanne Webb
- Education: Beacom College
- Occupation: Merchant

Military service
- Allegiance: United States
- Branch/service: United States Navy
- Battles/wars: World War II

Sherman Willard Tribbitt (November 9, 1922 – August 14, 2010) was an American merchant and politician from Odessa in New Castle County, Delaware. He was a World War II veteran and a member of the Democratic Party who served in the Delaware General Assembly, as the 17th lieutenant governor of Delaware, and as the 67th governor of Delaware.

== Early life and family ==
Tribbitt was born in Denton, Maryland, the son of Sherman L. and Minnie Thawley Tribbitt. He married Jeanne Webb in 1943. They had three children, James, Carol, and Sherman "Tip", and were members of the Presbyterian Church. He studied accounting at Beacom College in Wilmington, Delaware and briefly worked at the Security Trust Company in Wilmington. During World War II he served in the United States Navy. In early 1945 he was aboard the destroyer USS Frost in the North Atlantic when his unit received a Presidential Citation for sinking five U-boats.

== Professional and political career ==
Following World War II, he and his father-in-law operated the Odessa Supply Company in Odessa, Delaware, where they lived.

In 1956, Tribbitt was elected to the first of four terms in the Delaware House of Representatives, where he served from 1957 to 1964. He was Speaker from 1959 to 1964. Tribbitt prevailed in a difficult convention contest for the nomination and was elected lieutenant governor of Delaware in 1964, defeating William T. Best, a State Representative from Rehoboth Beach. He served from January 19, 1965, to January 21, 1969. Surprised to find Governor Charles L. Terry Jr. wanted to serve two terms, Tribbitt had no choice but to run for a second term himself. Like Terry, he was narrowly defeated in the 1968 Republican landslide by Eugene Bookhammer, a State Senator from Lewes.

== Governor of Delaware ==
Patiently planning a political recovery, Tribbitt was elected again to the Delaware House of Representatives in 1970 and was immediately elected minority leader for the 1971–72 session. When Governor Russell W. Peterson stumbled over the state's finances, Tribbitt had another opportunity for the governorship and was elected governor in 1972, defeating Peterson by 7,691 votes.

Tribbitt nearly made an appointment to the U.S. Senate. Future president Joe Biden was elected to the Senate in The same year Tribbitt was elected. On December 18, 1972, Biden's wife and daughter died in a car crash which injured Biden's sons. Biden contemplating on resigning his Senate seat, but decided to stay in the Senate up until his election as vice president 36 years later.

Tribbitt inherited the same state financial picture that forced his predecessor from office. In this time of high inflation there was constant pressure to raise salaries, particularly for teachers. Delaware's income tax rates were already among the highest in the nation and the solution was not obvious. There was an effort to levy a large tax on the one oil refinery in the state, but that was derailed when the owner, J. Paul Getty, threatened to close it. The union workers there opposed the legislation out of fear for their jobs. But the most serious financial crises involved the near-collapse of the Farmers' Bank of Delaware. It was the state's official bank, where all its funds were kept, and where many private investors had their life savings. The whole last year of Tribbitt's administration was spent trying to rectify the situation. Eventually the Federal Deposit Insurance Corporation (FDIC) agreed to make a large investment in the bank and buy many of its loans, but the state had to invest many millions as well. In 1981, under the next administration, the bank was sold.

Tribbitt took other steps to raise revenue, including beginning the Delaware Lottery. He also created the Department of Community Affairs and Economic Development to attract new industry to the state. Tribbitt sought a second term in 1976, but, largely because of the unresolved financial situation, lost to U.S. Representative Pete du Pont. by 33,051 votes

Delaware General Assembly (sessions while Governor)
Year	Assembly	Senate Majority	President pro tempore	House Majority	Speaker
1973–1974	127th	Democratic	J. Donald Isaacs	Republican	John F. Kirk, Jr.
1975–1976	128th	Democratic	J. Donald Isaacs	Democratic	Casimir S. Jonkiert

== Later career ==
Tribbitt made another bid for governor in 1984, losing the Democratic primary to former Delaware Supreme Court justice William T. Quillen. In an unusual campaign tactic, Tribbitt refused to debate his courtroom-trained opponent, saying that he would lose the debate. After leaving office he worked with the Delaware River Basin Commission and the Diamond Group consulting firm. He relocated to Dover and finally to Rehoboth Beach.

== Death ==
Sherman Tribbitt died on August 14, 2010, at the age of 87, a week after a severe fall. He had suffered from Alzheimer's disease. Jack Markell, Governor of Delaware at the time, ordered state flags lowered to half staff in Tribbitt's honor.

== Almanac ==
Elections are held the first Tuesday after November 1. Members of the Delaware General Assembly take office the second Tuesday of January. State Representatives have a two-year term. The Governor and Lieutenant Governor take office the third Tuesday of January and each has a four-year term.

Public Offices
Office	Type	Location	Began office	Ended office	notes
State Representative	Legislature	Dover	January 8, 1957	January 13, 1959	
State Representative	Legislature	Dover	January 13, 1959	January 10, 1961	
State Representative	Legislature	Dover	January 10, 1961	January 8, 1963	
State Representative	Legislature	Dover	January 8, 1963	January 12, 1965	
Lt. Governor	Executive	Dover	January 19, 1965	January 21, 1969	
State Representative	Legislature	Dover	January 12, 1971	January 9, 1973	
Governor	Executive	Dover	January 16, 1973	January 18, 1977	

Delaware General Assembly service
Dates	Assembly	Chamber	Majority	Governor	Committees	District
1957–1958	119th	State House	Democratic	J. Caleb Boggs		New Castle 13th
1959–1960	120th	State House	Democratic	J. Caleb Boggs	Speaker	New Castle 13th
1961–1962	121st	State House	Democratic	Elbert N. Carvel	Speaker	New Castle 13th
1963–1964	122nd	State House	Democratic	Elbert N. Carvel	Speaker	New Castle 13th
1971–1972	126th	State House	Republican	Russell W. Peterson		27th

Election results
Year	Office	Election	Subject	Party	Votes	%	Opponent	Party	Votes	%
1964	Lt. Governor	General	Sherman W. Tribbitt	Democratic	108,742	55%	William T. Best	Republican	89,675	45%
1968	Lt. Governor	General	Sherman W. Tribbitt	Democratic	99,421	49%	Eugene D. Bookhammer	Republican	101,839	51%
1972	Governor	General	Sherman W. Tribbitt	Democratic	117,274	51%	Russell W. Peterson	Republican	109,583	48%
1976	Governor	General	Sherman W. Tribbitt	Democratic	97,480	42%	Pierre S. du Pont, IV	Republican	130,531	57%
1984	Governor	Primary	Sherman W. Tribbitt	Democratic	14,185	41%	William T. Quillen	Democratic	20,473	59%

== See also ==
- Delaware lunar sample displays

== Images ==
- Hall of Governors Portrait Gallery ; Portrait courtesy of Historical and Cultural Affairs, Dover.

== Places with more information ==
- Delaware Historical Society; website; 505 North Market Street, Wilmington, Delaware 19801; (302) 655–7161
- University of Delaware; Library website; 181 South College Avenue, Newark, Delaware 19717; (302) 831-2965

Party political offices
Preceded by Eugene Lammot	Democratic nominee for Lieutenant Governor of Delaware; 1964, 1968	Succeeded by Clifford B. Hearn
Preceded by Charles L. Terry Jr.	Democratic nominee for Governor of Delaware; 1972, 1976	Succeeded by William J. Gordy
Political offices
Preceded by Eugene Lammot	Lieutenant Governor of Delaware; 1965-1969	Succeeded by Eugene Bookhammer
Preceded by Russell W. Peterson	Governor of Delaware; 1973-1977	Succeeded by Pierre S. du Pont IV
