= Norman A. Eskridge =

American politician

Member of the Delaware House of Representatives from the Sussex County 3rd district
- In office 1955–1965
- Preceded by: Dale E. Wheatley
- Succeeded by: District eliminated

Member of the Delaware House of Representatives from the 31st district
- In office 1965–1969
- Preceded by: District established
- Succeeded by: W. Neal Moerschel

Personal details
- Born: June 27, 1901 Sussex County, Delaware, U.S.
- Died: December 25, 1969 (aged 68)
- Party: Democratic

Norman A. Eskridge (June 27, 1901 – December 25, 1969) was an American politician. He served as a Democratic member of the Delaware House of Representatives.

== Life and career ==
Eskridge was born in Sussex County, Delaware. He attended Seaford Central School. Eskridge served in the Delaware House of Representatives from 1955 to 1969.

Eskridge died on December 25, 1969, at the age of 68.
