= List of Delaware state symbols =

Location of the state of Delaware in the United States of America

In the state of Delaware, numerous symbols have been approved by the Delaware General Assembly and added to the Delaware Code.

== Insignia ==
| Type | Symbol | Description | Year | Image | Source |
|---|---|---|---|---|---|
| Flag | The flag of Delaware | Consists of a buff-colored diamond on a field of colonial blue, with the coat of arms of the state of Delaware inside the diamond. Below the diamond, the date December 7, 1787, declares the day on which Delaware became the first state to ratify the United States Constitution. The colors of the flag reflect the colors of the uniform of General George Washington. | 1913 | Delaware flag | |
| Seal | The great seal of the state of Delaware | First adopted in 1777, with the current version being adopted in 2004. It contains the state coat of arms surrounded by the inscription "Great Seal of the State of Delaware" and the dates 1704, 1776 and 1787. | 1777 | Delaware seal | |
| Motto | "Liberty and Independence" | Derived from the Order of Cincinnati | 1847 | — | |
| Nicknames | The First State | Adopted to commemorate Delaware becoming the first of the 13 original states to ratify the U.S. Constitution. | 2002 | | |
| Nicknames | The Diamond State | This nickname comes from the legend that Thomas Jefferson described Delaware as a jewel among states due to its strategic location on the Eastern Seaboard. | | — | |
| Nicknames | Blue Hen State | This nickname comes from the fighting Blue Hen cocks that were carried with soldiers for entertainment during the Revolutionary War. | | Delaware Blue Hen cock | |
| Nicknames | Small Wonder | This nickname comes from substantial contributions Delaware has made as compared to its relatively small size. | | — | |

== Species ==
| Type | Symbol | Description | Year | Image | Source |
|---|---|---|---|---|---|
| Fruit | Strawberry | | 2010 | | |
| Bird | Delaware Blue Hen | The Blue Hen has been used as many political campaigns and publications. | 1939 | Delaware Blue Hen cock | |
| Bug (Note: Delaware state code specifies "bug" rather than "insect".) | Lady bug | Officially adopted at the suggestion of Mollie Brown-Rust's second grade class at the Lulu M. Ross Elementary School in Milford, Delaware. | 1974 | | |
| Tree | American holly Ilex opaca | Regarded as one of Delaware's most important forest trees | 1939 | | |
| Flower | Peach blossom | Officially adopted in recognition of peach tree orchards yielding thousands of dollars' worth of crop worth at that time. | 1895 | | |
| Fish | Weakfish; Cynoscion | Officially adopted in recognition of its values as a game and food fish. | 1981 | | |
| Herb | Sweet goldenrod Solidago odora | Officially adopted indigenous to the state, commonly found in coastal areas and along the edges of marshes and thickets | 1996 | | |
| Butterfly | Eastern tiger swallowtail Pterourus glaucus | Officially adopted as indigenous to Delaware and commonly found in deciduous woods, along streams, rivers, and wooded swamps, and in towns and cities throughout Delaware. They were chosen based on a statewide vote of public and parochial students, out of suggestions from students of the Richardson Park Learning Center. | 1999 | | |
| Marine animal | Horseshoe crab Limulus polyphemus | Officially adopted in recognition of its importance and value in the medical field and as the principal food source for more than a million shore birds. | 2002 | | |
| Macroinvertebrate | Stonefly (order Plecoptera) | Officially adopted in recognition of the importance of excellent water quality and the vital role played by healthy aquatic ecosystems. It was supported by Gunning-Bedford Middle School, Salesianum High School, Delcastle Technical High School, Dickinson High School Environmental Club, The Independence School, Springer Middle School, St. Andrews School, and The Charter School of Wilmington. | 2005 | | |
| Wildlife animal | Grey fox (Note: Delaware state code specifies the spelling "grey".); Urocyon cinereoargenteus | | 2010 | | |
| Sea turtle | Loggerhead turtle Caretta caretta | | 2022 | | |
| Dog | Rescue dogs | | 2023 | | |
| Dragonfly | Blue dasher Pachydiplax longipennis | | 2025 | | |
| Migratory bird | Red knot Calidris canutus | | 2025 | | |
| Sea shell | Channeled whelk Busycotypus canaliculatus | | 2014 | | |
| Dinosaur | Dryptosauridae | | 2022 | | |

== Geology ==
| Type | Symbol | Description | Year | Image | Source |
|---|---|---|---|---|---|
| Mineral | Sillimanite | Recognized by geologists in Delaware prior to 1830, is widespread throughout the schists of the Delaware Piedmont, and occurs as large masses and stream-rounded boulders at the Brandywine Springs State Park | 1977 | | |
| Fossil | Belemnite | Officially adopted at the suggestion of Kathy Tidball's third grade Quest students at Martin Luther King, Jr. Elementary School in Wilmington, Delaware. The fossil, an extinct squid with a conical shell, is commonly found along the Chesapeake and Delaware Canal. | 1996 | | |
| Soil | Greenwich loam | Commonly found in all counties in Delaware and enhancing water quality, agriculture, wildlife habitat, and natural landscape beauty | 2000 | | |

== Culture ==
| Type | Symbol | Description | Year | Image | Source |
|---|---|---|---|---|---|
| Song | "Our Delaware" by George Beswick Hynson | The song comprises three verses, each honoring one of Delaware's three counties, with the fourth verse added by Donn Devine commemorating the American Revolution Bicentennial in 1976. The musical score was composed by Will M. S. Brown specifically for the poem. | 1925 | — | |
| Colors | Colonial blue and buff | | | | |
| Dessert | Peach pie | | 2009 | | |
| Beverage | Milk | | 1983 | | |
| Cocktail | Orange Crush | | 2024 | | |
| Star | TYC 3429-697-1 | The star in the Ursa Major constellation was officially adopted after it was nicknamed "The Delaware Diamond". Despite being the official state star, its name is not recognized by astronomical community, because it was named by the private company International Star Registry. | 2000 | | |
| Tall ship | Kalmar Nyckel | Serves "as Delaware's seagoing ambassador both at home and at many ports of call, raising awareness of the First State for thousands who see her and come on board". | 2016 | | |
| Sport | Bicycling | | 2014 | | |
| Historical aircraft | Bellanca Cruisair | | 2019 | | |

== Other ==
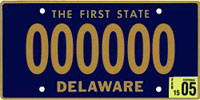
License plate for Delaware

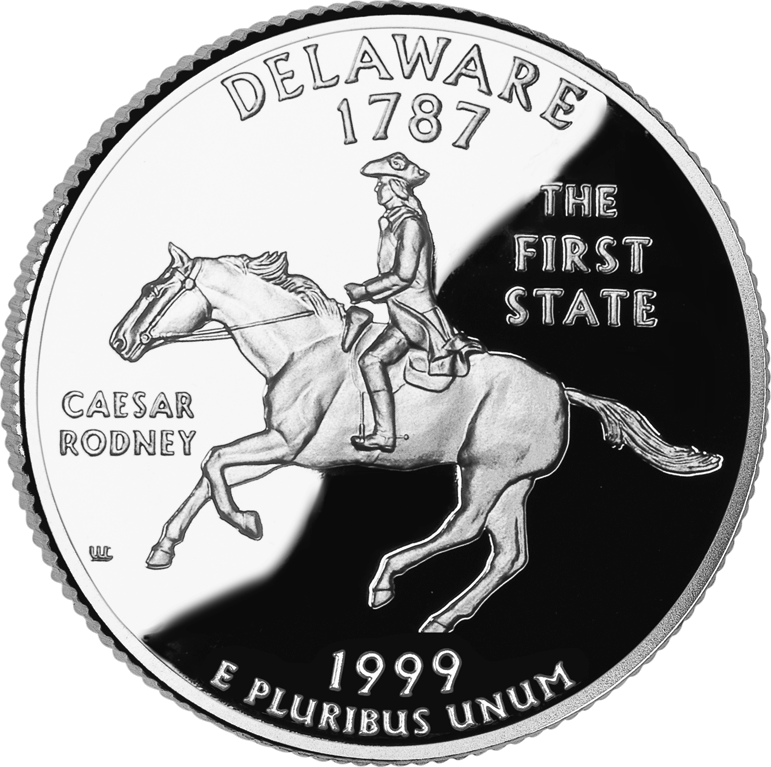
State quarter for Delaware

== See also ==
- List of Delaware-related topics
- Lists of United States state insignia
- State of Delaware
