= 1904 Delaware gubernatorial election =

- November 8, 1904
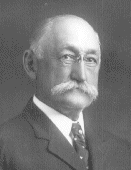
Nominee	Preston Lea	Caleb S. Pennewill
Party	Republican	Democratic
Popular vote	22,532	19,780
Percentage	51.40%	45.13%
- County results Lea: 40–50% 50–60%
Governor before election
John Hunn
Republican
Elected Governor
Preston Lea
Republican

The 1904 Delaware gubernatorial election was held on November 8, 1904. Though incumbent Republican Governor John Hunn was eligible to run for re-election, he declined to do so. Instead, as the intra-party battle in the Republican Party between the Addicks and anti-Addicks factions continued, Hunn stepped aside to avoid additional conflict. The Addicks, or Union Republicans, nominated Henry C. Conrad for Governor, while the anti-Addicks, or Regular Republicans, held out with their own ticket and nominated Joseph H. Chandler for Governor. On October 12, 1904, the two factions united and agreed to jointly nominate industrialist Preston Lea, a favorite of the Regular Republicans.

In the general election, Lea faced Chandler, the erstwhile candidate of the Regular Republicans, who refused to step aside for Lea and continued his campaign, and former State Senator Caleb S. Pennewill, the Democratic nominee. Lea ended up defeating his opponents by a decisive margin, though somewhat reduced from Hunn's victory in 1900.

== General election ==
1904 Delaware gubernatorial election
Party	Candidate	Votes	%	±%
Republican	Preston Lea	22,532	51.40%	−2.17%
Democratic	Caleb S. Pennewill	19,780	45.13%	+0.20%
Independent Republican	Joseph H. Chandler	802	1.83%	—
Prohibition	John R. Price	588	0.13%	−0.03%
Socialist	Gustave E. Reinike	131	0.30%	+0.17%
Majority		2,752	6.28%	−2.37%
Turnout		43,833	100.00%	
Republican hold				

== Bibliography ==
- Delaware Senate Journal, 90th General Assembly, 1st Reg. Sess. (1905).
