= John Hunn =

John Hunn may refer to:

- John Hunn (farmer) (1818–1894), American farmer, minister and abolitionist from Delaware, father of John Hunn (governor)
- John Hunn (governor) (1849–1926), American businessman and politician, Governor of Delaware
- Jack Hunn (1906–1997), New Zealand civil servant
- John Hunn (philanthropist), New Zealand businessman, philanthropist and former managing director of the Todd Corporation
