= 1912 Delaware gubernatorial election =

- November 5, 1912
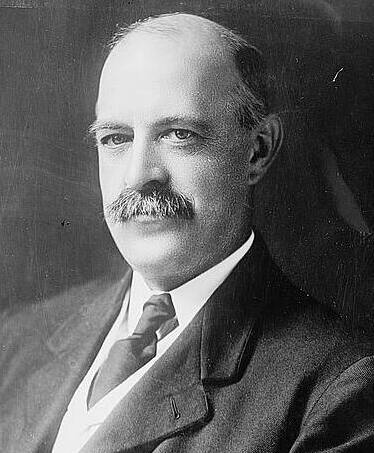

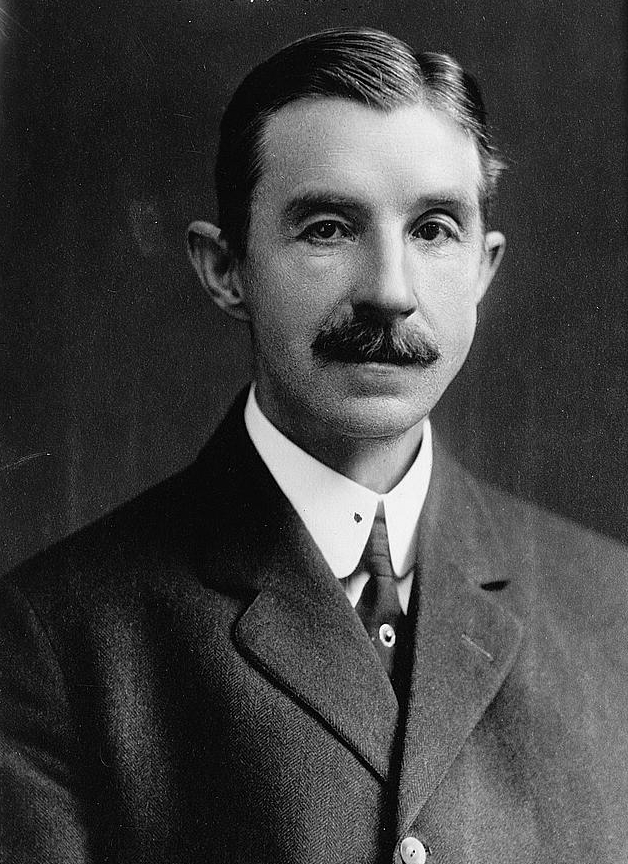
Nominee	Charles R. Miller	Thomas M. Monaghan	George B. Hynson
Party	Republican	Democratic	Progressive
Popular vote	22,745	21,460	3,019
Percentage	46.95%	44.30%	6.23%
- County results Miller: 40–50% Monaghan: 40–50%
Governor before election
Simeon S. Pennewill
Republican
Elected Governor
Charles R. Miller
Republican

The 1912 Delaware gubernatorial election was held on November 5, 1912. Though Republican Governor Simeon S. Pennewill was eligible for re-election, State Senator Charles R. Miller was nominated by the state Republican convention. With the nationwide rise of the Progressive Party, Delaware Republicans were keen to not lose the race due to a strong showing by a Progressive candidate; Miller was seen as amenable to all factions of the Republican Party and to Progressives. In the general election, Miller faced Democratic nominee Thomas M. Monaghan, who had been elected as State Senate President in a majority-Republican chamber as the result of a coalition agreement with Progressives, and Progressive nominee George B. Hynson.

With three strong candidates running, the general election was close. Miller ended up narrowly winning, continuing the Republicans' winning streak in the state, but he defeated Monaghan by only 1,285 votes, winning with a bare plurality. Miller received 47% of the vote to Monaghan's 44% and Hynson's 6%.

== General election ==
1912 Delaware gubernatorial election
Party	Candidate	Votes	%	±%
Republican	Charles R. Miller	22,745	46.95%	−5.01%
Democratic	Thomas M. Monaghan	21,460	44.30%	−3.26%
Progressive	George B. Hynson	3,019	6.23%	—
Prohibition	John Heyd	662	1.37%	—
Socialist	Norman L. Rearick	555	1.15%	+0.68%
Majority		1,285	2.65%	−1.75%
Turnout		48,441	100.00%	
Republican hold				

== Bibliography ==
- Delaware Senate Journal, 94th General Assembly, 1st Reg. Sess. (1913).
