= Delaware Law Enforcement Memorial =

US law enforcement memorial in Dover, Delaware

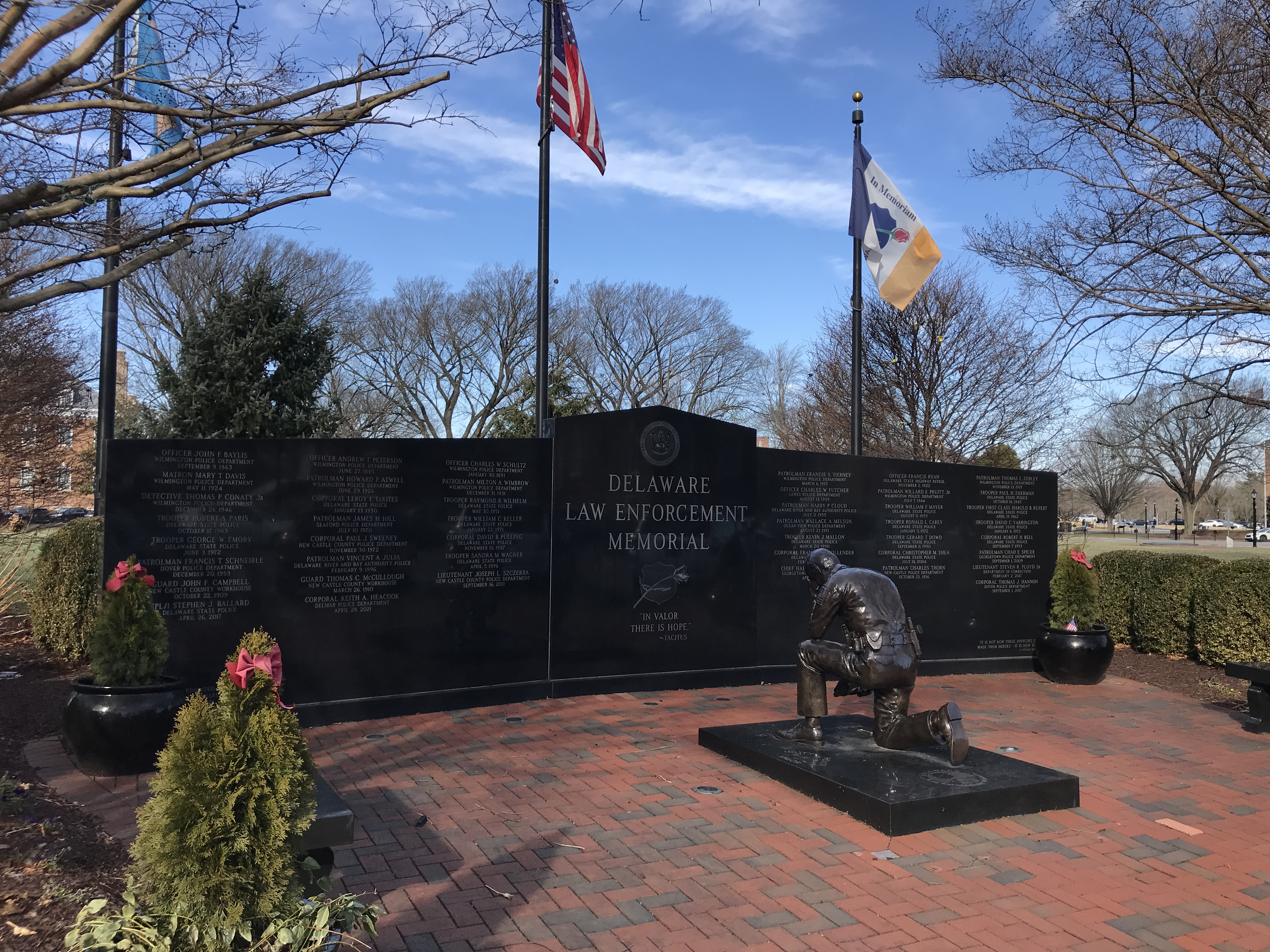
- Delaware Law Enforcement Memorial (January 2022)
- Location: Dover, Delaware, U.S.
- Coordinates: 39°9′23.4″N 75°31′16.2″W
- Type: Memorial
- Material: Black granite, bronze
- Opening date: April 2010

The Delaware Law Enforcement Memorial is a law enforcement memorial in Dover, Delaware, United States. The memorial was unveiled in April 2010. It was vandalized in June 2020.

== Description ==
The memorial is located on the south side of Legislative Mall. It consists of three slabs of black granite and a statue. The center piece of granite contains the Seal of Delaware, a shield and rose symbol (a symbol used at the National Law Enforcement Officers Memorial), and the phrase "In valor there is hope" (a quote by Tacitus). Two additional adjoining slabs contain the names of 36 Delaware police officers who died in the line of duty since 1863. In front of the center-slab is Call to Duty, a life-sized bronze statue of a police officer depicted kneeling in grief. The 600 lb. statue was sculpted by Neil Brodin.

== History ==
A 2009 joint resolution by the Delaware General Assembly approved the memorial and set aside a site on the Legislative Mall. Governor Jack Markell signed the bill. According to New Castle police chief Kevin P. McDerby, some of the $260,000 raised for the monument came from assets and property seized during criminal investigations.

The memorial was unveiled on April 14, 2010.

=== Vandalism ===
At around 5:30 AM on June 12, 2020, an unknown individual repeatedly struck the back of the kneeling officer statue's neck with an axe, leaving multiple marks. An axe and two urine-soaked flags were left at the statue's feet. A white man from Camden was arrested and charged after returning to the scene to retrieve his cellphone.
