= 1908 Delaware gubernatorial election =

- November 3, 1908
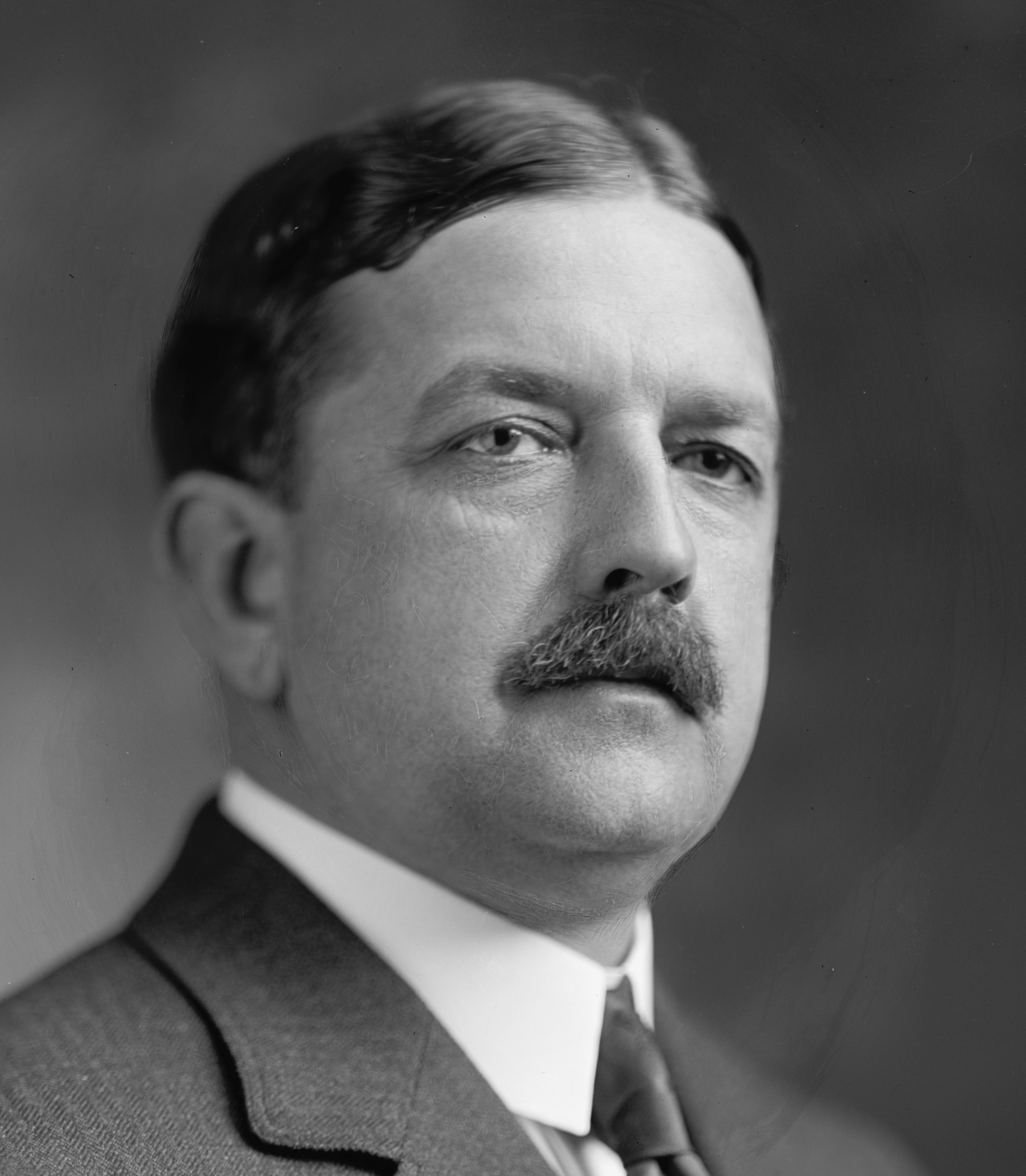
Nominee	Simeon S. Pennewill	Rowland G. Paynter
Party	Republican	Democratic
Popular vote	24,905	22,794
Percentage	51.97%	47.56%
- County results Pennewill: 50–60% Paynter: 50–60%
Governor before election
Preston Lea
Republican
Elected Governor
Simeon S. Pennewill
Republican

The 1908 Delaware gubernatorial election was held on November 3, 1908. Though some Republicans had interest in nominating incumbent Governor Preston Lea to a second term, the state convention instead named former State Senator Simeon S. Pennewill as the Republican nominee. In the general election, Pennewill faced Democratic nominee Rowland G. Paynter, a physician. Pennewill ultimately defeated Paynter by a relatively slim margin, continuing the Republican streak in Delaware gubernatorial elections.

== General election ==
1908 Delaware gubernatorial election
Party	Candidate	Votes	%	±%
Republican	Simeon S. Pennewill	24,905	51.97%	+0.56%
Democratic	Rowland G. Paynter	22,794	47.56%	+2.44%
Socialist	J. Frank Smith	225	0.47%	+0.17%
Majority		2,111	4.40%	−1.87%
Turnout		47,924	100.00%	
Republican hold				

== Bibliography ==
- Delaware Senate Journal, 92nd General Assembly, 1st Reg. Sess. (1909).
