= Music of Delaware =

- State song: "Our Delaware"

Delaware is a state in the Mid-Atlantic region of the United States. The Delaware Symphony Orchestra is the largest organization of professional performers in the state, and is more than seventy years old; the orchestra evolved out of the Wilmington Symphony Orchestra. The Delaware Music Festival is a prominent music festival. Other musical institutions include OperaDelaware, the Music School of Delaware, and the School of Contemporary Music.

Delaware is also home to the Firefly Music Festival and The Big Barrel Country Music Festival annual music festivals held at the Dover International Speedway.

The state song of Delaware is "Our Delaware", with words by George B. Hynson and Donn Devine and music by Will M. S. Brown.

Recent, local trends include a surge in popularity for the blues.

== Notable Delaware musicians ==
- Boysetsfire, post-hardcore punk band, Newark, Delaware.
- David Bromberg lives in Wilmington.
- Clifford Brown, jazz trumpeter from Wilmington.
- Cab Calloway, jazz band leader, retired to Wilmington, and died in Hockessin, Delaware his song "Minnie the Moocher" was posthumously inducted into the Grammy Hall of Fame in 1999.
- The Caulfields from Newark, Delaware.
- The Crash Motive from Newark, Delaware.
- Bob Marley lived in Delaware for a brief time, during which he was employed at Chrysler.
- Dorothy Rudd Moore, composer, from New Castle, Delaware.
- Matthew Shipp, jazz pianist from Wilmington.
- Smashing Orange from Wilmington.
- Spindrift from Newark, Delaware.
- The Spinto Band from Wilmington.
- George Thorogood, blues/rock musician from Wilmington. Did "Bad to the Bone" in 1982. He attended the University of Delaware.
- Tom Verlaine and Richard Hell of the band Television met attending school at Sanford.
- Vinnie Moore, guitarist for UFO (band) from New Castle, Delaware

== See also ==
- Indigenous music of North America
