= Camden Friends Meetinghouse =

Historic church in Delaware, United States

- U.S. National Register of Historic Places
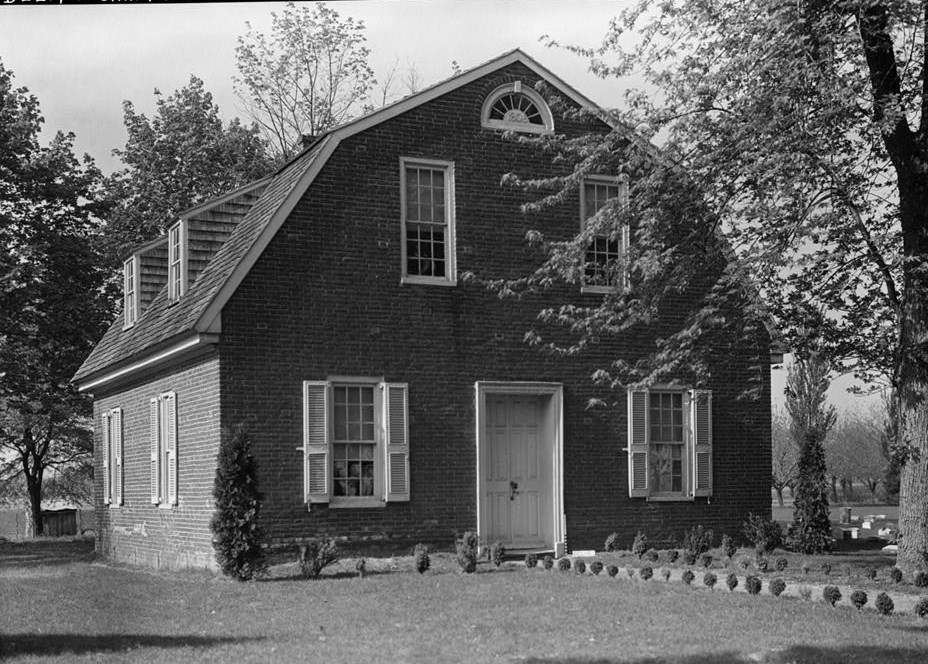
- Camden Friends Meetinghouse, HABS Photo, 1936

- Location within Delaware Location within the United States
- Location: Camden Wyoming Avenue, Camden, Delaware
- Coordinates: 39.11444°N 75.54793°W
- Area: 0.1 acres (0.040 ha)
- Built: 1805
- Built by: Hunn, Jonathan; Hunn, Patience
- NRHP reference No.: 73000485
- Added to NRHP: April 03, 1973

Camden Friends Meeting House is a historic Quaker meeting house located on Delaware Route 10 (Camden Wyoming Avenue) in Camden, Delaware. It was built in 1805, was listed on the National Register of Historic Places in 1973, and continues to be used by Camden Friends Meeting as the only active Quaker meeting house remaining in Kent County. A modern social hall was built behind the historic building in 2009, designed to be energy-efficient and architecturally respectful of the historic building.

Camden was once the center of a Quaker population, with the town laid out by Quaker Daniel Mifflin in 1783. Camden Friends Meeting House was initially built to serve a preparative meeting which was established in 1795 under the care of Motherkill Monthly Meeting. The preparative meeting was upgraded in 1830 to Camden Monthly Meeting as a merger of Motherkill Monthly Meeting and Duck Creek Meeting. Camden Friends Meeting is affiliated with Philadelphia Yearly Meeting and Friends General Conference. Camden Friends Meeting is currently the only active Quaker meeting in Kent County.

The meetinghouse is a two-story, gambrel-roofed, brick building measuring 2,864 square feet (266.1 m^{2}). The roof is punctuated by two shed-roofed dormers designed for lighting the second floor, which housed a school that operated from 1805 to 1882. The original desks, benches, and blackboard are still present in the school room, along with a unique ten-plate stove manufactured in Wrightsville, Pennsylvania. Camden Friends Meeting House is unique among typical Quaker places of worship due to its gambrel roof, double doors at the front and rear, and its lack of porches. A partitioned panel between the meeting room and the stairway leading to the schoolroom can be dropped into a specially-constructed groove, used to provide extra seating space on the steps at times of an overfilled meeting.

Numerous members participated in the abolitionist movement and the Underground Railroad, including John Hunn who was a conductor and "Chief Engineer" of Delaware operations.

The Meeting House's adjacent burial ground has notably tall gravestones, the oldest of which dates to 1837. The burial ground contains the remains of John Hunn and his son, Delaware Governor John Hunn Jr. Also present in the burial ground is a memorial stone to Warner Mifflin, an early abolitionist. The stone was originally located in the Motherkill Monthly Meeting burial ground near Magnolia, where he is buried in an unmarked grave. When Motherkill burial ground became neglected, the stone was moved to Camden Friends Meeting burial ground in 1937.

The restored meeting house and social hall won the 2011 Northeast Sustainable Energy Association (NESEA)'s "Zero Net Energy Building Award, was one of the 2010 Real Estate and Construction Review's "Best New Green Projects in the Northeast Region", and won the "2010 Preservation Award of the Year" of the Friends of Old Dover.

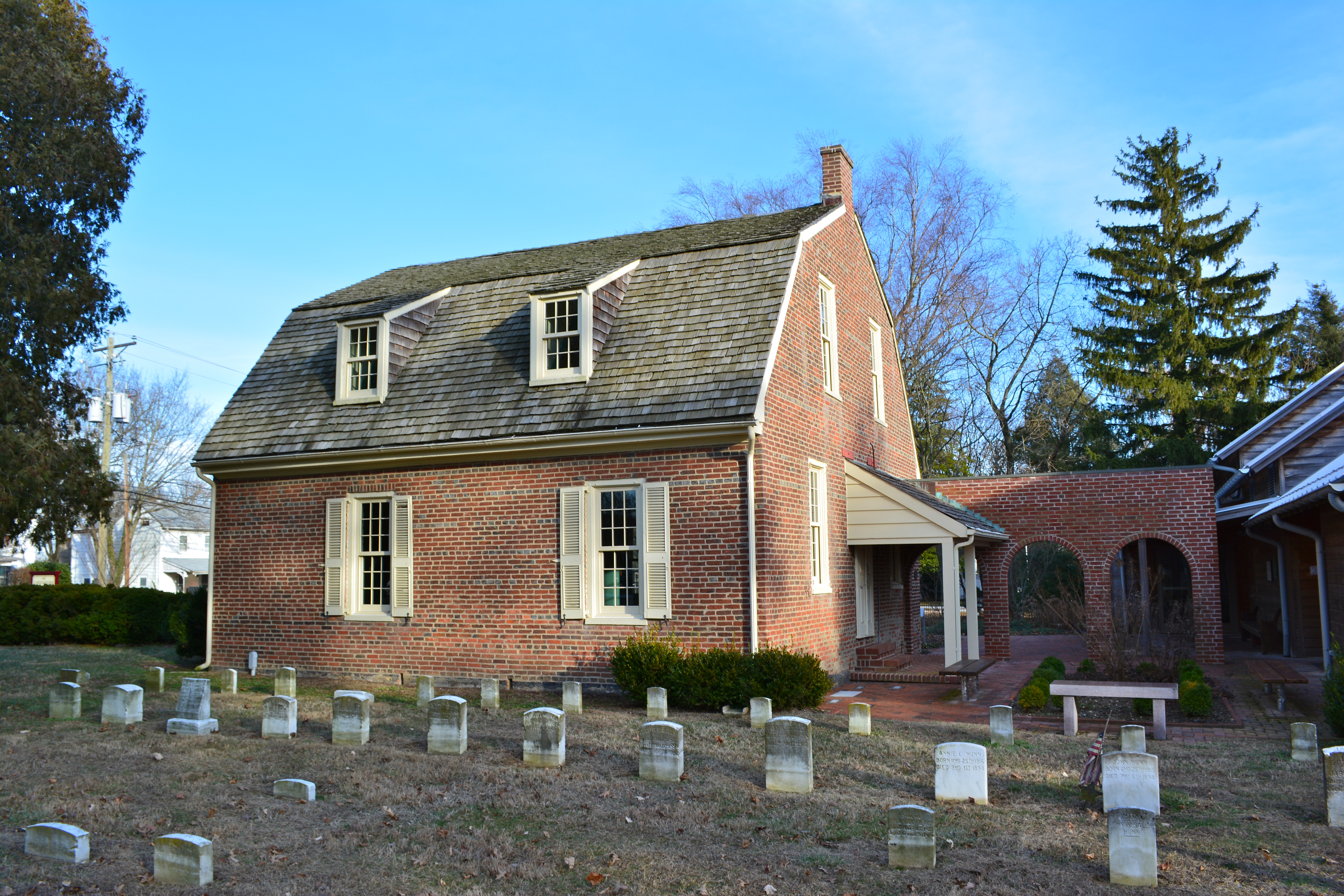

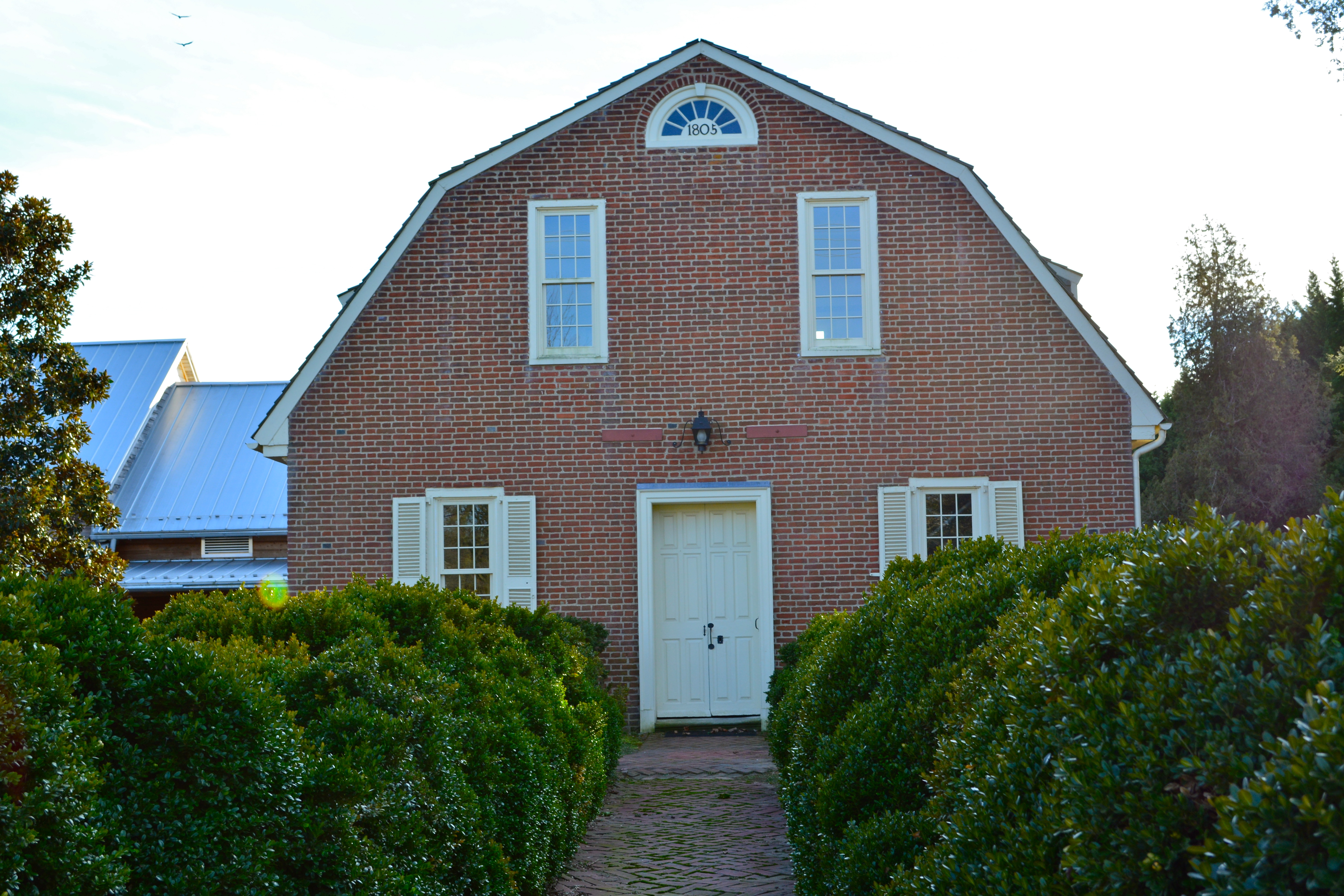
