= Flag of Delaware =

U.S. state flag

Delaware
- Delawarean flag
- Use: Civil and state flag
- Proportion: 2:3
- Adopted: July 24, 1913; 113 years ago
- Design: A colonial blue field with the state coat of arms inside a tan rhombus above the date December 7, 1787 in white.

The flag of Delaware consists of a buff-colored rhombus on a field of colonial blue, with the coat of arms of the state of Delaware inside the rhombus. Below the rhombus, the date December 7, 1787, declares the day on which Delaware became the first state to ratify the United States Constitution. The colors of the flag reflect the colors of the uniform of General George Washington.

== Design and specifications ==
The 2024 Delaware Code, § 306 defines that the flag shall have:

"a background of colonial blue surrounding a diamond of buff in which diamond is placed the correct coat of arms of the State in the colors prescribed by law and in accordance with § 301 of this title, with the words, 'December 7, 1787,' to be inscribed underneath the diamond."

=== Colors ===
The official state colors, colonial blue and buff, are designated by the Textile Color Card Association of the United States, Inc., New York, as "armor blue" (Cable No. 10663), and "golden beige" (Cable No. 10781) respectively; the color shades having been determined by Colorimetric Specifications of the National Bureau of Standards, United States Department of Commerce, in Test No. 2, 1/140565, dated November 18, 1954, which is on file with the Delaware Public Archives, Dover, Delaware. The colors of the coat of arms and other elements of the state flag shall be the following: Husbandman, trousers of gray-brown, shirt of red, hat and hilling hoe of brown; rifleman, suit of green, binding, bag and leggings of buff, hat of brown, powder flask and feather of gray; shield, frame of shaded yellow, top panel of orange, center panel of blue, lower panel of white, ox of red-brown, grass and corn of green, wheat and branches underfoot of yellow, heraldic wreath to be blue and silver (twisted); ship under full sail to have a dark hull and white sails; date, December 7, 1787, to be white; cord and tassels to be blue and gold.

== History ==
=== Pre-official flags ===
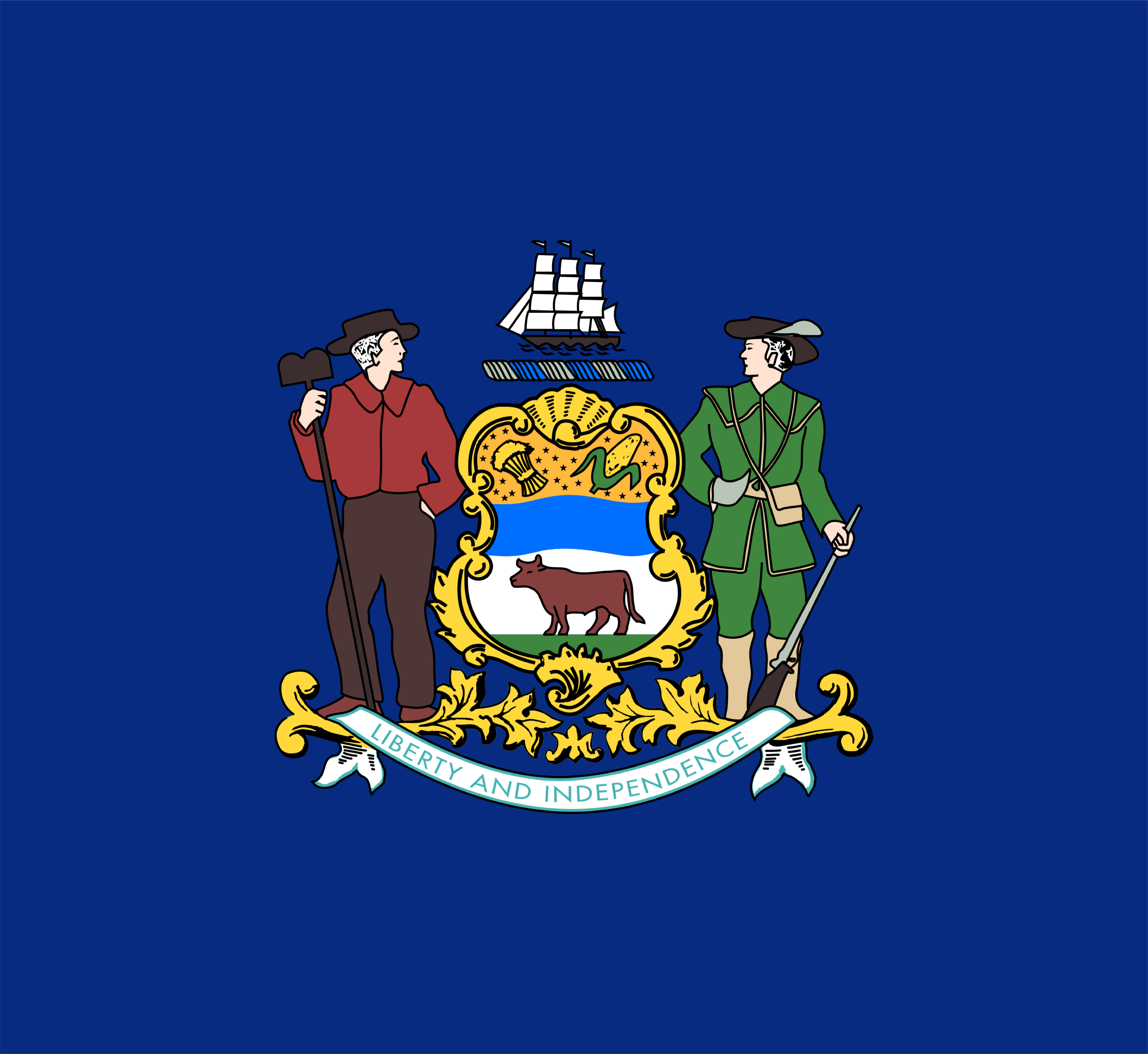
Reconstruction of the state flag used from 1862 to 1913

In December of 1861, the state house adopted a resolution to purchase a state flag, to be displayed in the senate chambers. During the American Civil War, regiments from Delaware flew a flag which was similar to the current state flag. The design had the state coat of arms on a field of blue with the name of the regiment inscribed on it.

On January 14, 1875 the house once again adopted a resolution for funds to purchase a state flag. Although many of the members of that house did not know what it look like. Week later they were given a description of the flag and on January 28, the resolution was passed. The flag was 6 x 6 1/2 feet with a deep blue background bearing the state coat of arms in the middle. It was presented to them it February. In March they sent the flag to the Centennial Exposition in Philadelphia.

In 1883, a state flag was given to a local Grand Army of the Republic chapter. It had the name of the post on the field.

Two years later members of the state house voted to fund a replacement their old state flag with a new one. The old flag was described as having a blue field with the state's coat of arms in the middle. The new flag was presented at the Washington Monument on February 22, and also flew at Grover Cleveland Inauguration. The old flag was put on display at the state library.

Another resolution to purchase a state flag for the house happened again in 1897. A year later members of a local Grand Army of the Republic chapter were given a state flag by the Dupoint family. In 1901 the flag was ordered to fly haft-mast after news of Queen Victoria death.

According to Evening journal by 1905 very few copies of blue state flag were made.

In March of 1909, a state flag was displayed in Dover. It had a blue field with the state's coat of arms in the middle.

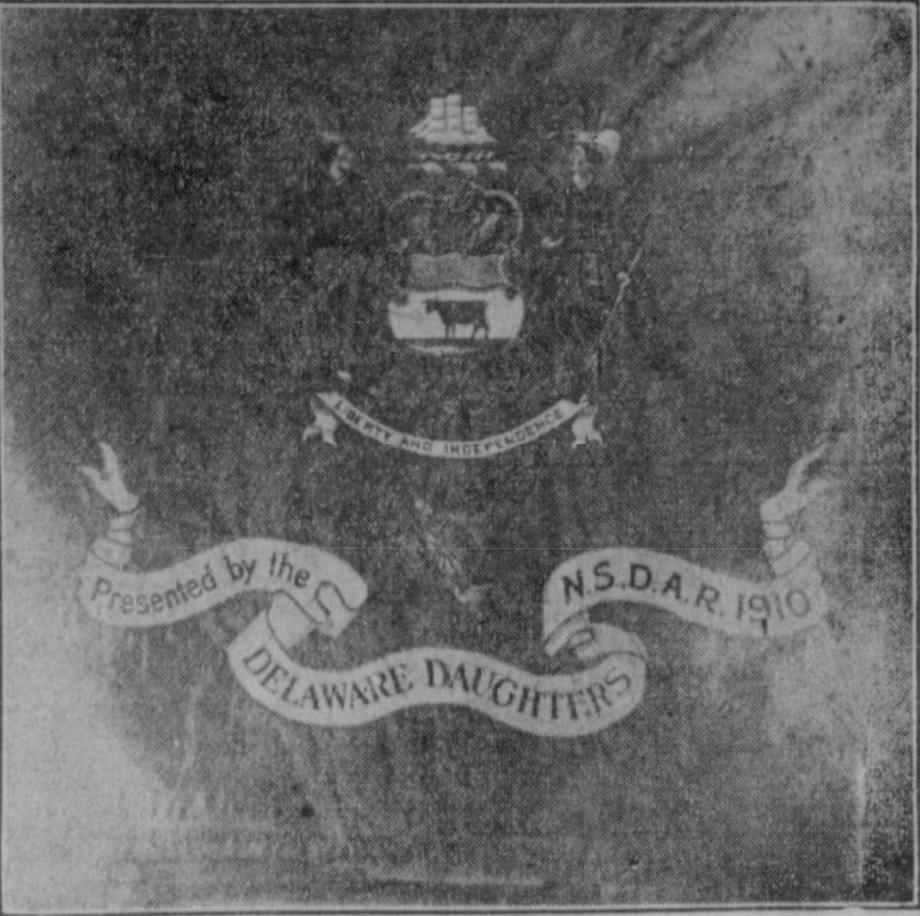
Flag given to the USS Delaware in 1910

In June of 1909, the state commissioned members of Daughters of the American revolution to make a state flag for the USS Delaware. In January of 1910, the flag was presented to the ship. It bore a blue field with the state's coat of arms above the federally's logo, a white scroll sits below the D.A.R. logo with the inscription: "Presented by the Delaware Daughters, N. S. D. A. R., 1910" . The banner measured around 4 x 5 feet.

In September of 1910, a local Wilmington firehouse was given a state flag from a Women's Auxiliary. The flag featured a blue background with the coat of arms of the state in the center, it measured 6 x 6 1/2 feet.

=== Current flag ===
In February of 1913 a commission formed to create a state flag. The current flag was adopted on July 24, 1913.

The coat of arms in the center of the flag was adopted on January 17, 1787. It depicts a shield of horizontal orange, blue, and white stripes. On the stripes are a sheaf of wheat, an ear of corn, and an ox standing on grass, all representing Delaware's agriculture. Above the shield is a sailing ship. Supporting the shield are a farmer on the left and a soldier on the right. The state motto, below the shield, reads "Liberty and Independence". These symbols are also included on the seal of Delaware.

In 2001, a survey conducted by the North American Vexillological Association (NAVA) placed Delaware's flag 52nd in design quality out of the 72 Canadian provincial, U.S. state and U.S. territorial flags ranked.

=== Other flags ===
A year after adopting a state flag members of the Daughters of the American revolution constructed a state flag that was later sent to Memorial Continental Hall, the flag featured a yellow rhombus with no date below it.

On October 21, 1916 the Women's College of Delaware was given a unique state flag by Daughters of the American revolution. It contained the coat of arms on a plain field of blue.

In 1918 a local Order of United American Mechanics chapter in Dover hung out a state flag with the letters "O. U. A. M." on it.

In 1920 local school in Milford won a state flag in a contest, it contain a yellow rhombus.

In 1936, police stations across the state flew the state flag with the inscriptions "state police," above the rhombus and "December 1, 1787," below it.

In 1946 Governor Walter Bacon gave Denmark a variant of the state flag with a golden rhombus instead of a bluff one, to celebrate the rebuilding of a park near Aalborg.

== Governor's flag ==
The official flag of the governor of the state shall be identical to the official state flag except that it shall also bear a fringe of gold surrounding the edge of the flag. The pole upon which the governor's flag is carried shall have mounted thereon a model of a blue hen's fighting cock.

In the early 1900s before the official flag of the state flag was adopted the Governor used the same unofficial flag like the state house, a plain blue flag with the coat of arms of the state in the middle.

In February of 1913, it was a proposed that only the Governor's flag featured the date under a golden rhombus.

== Gallery ==
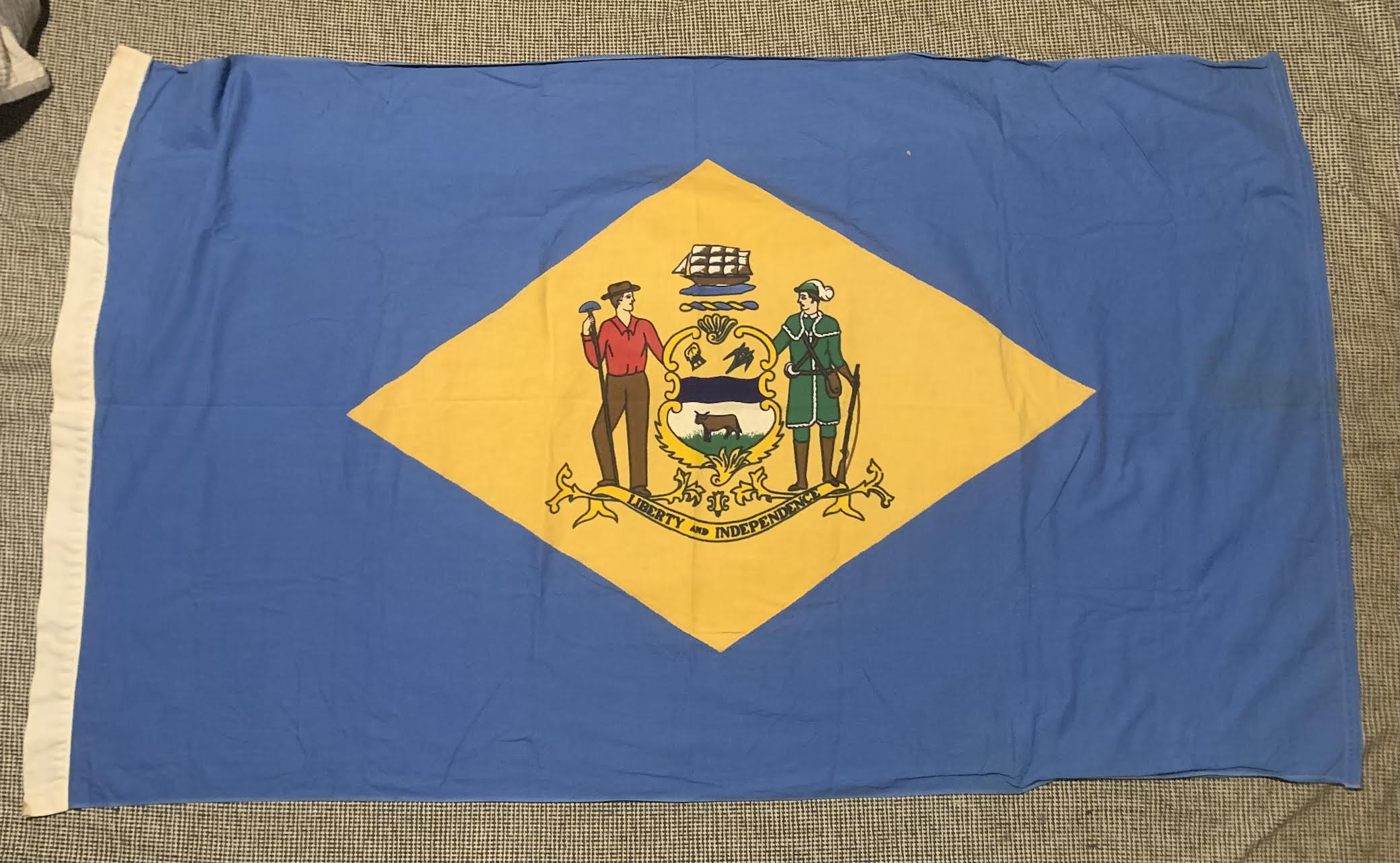
Vintage state flag with a golden rhombus and no text

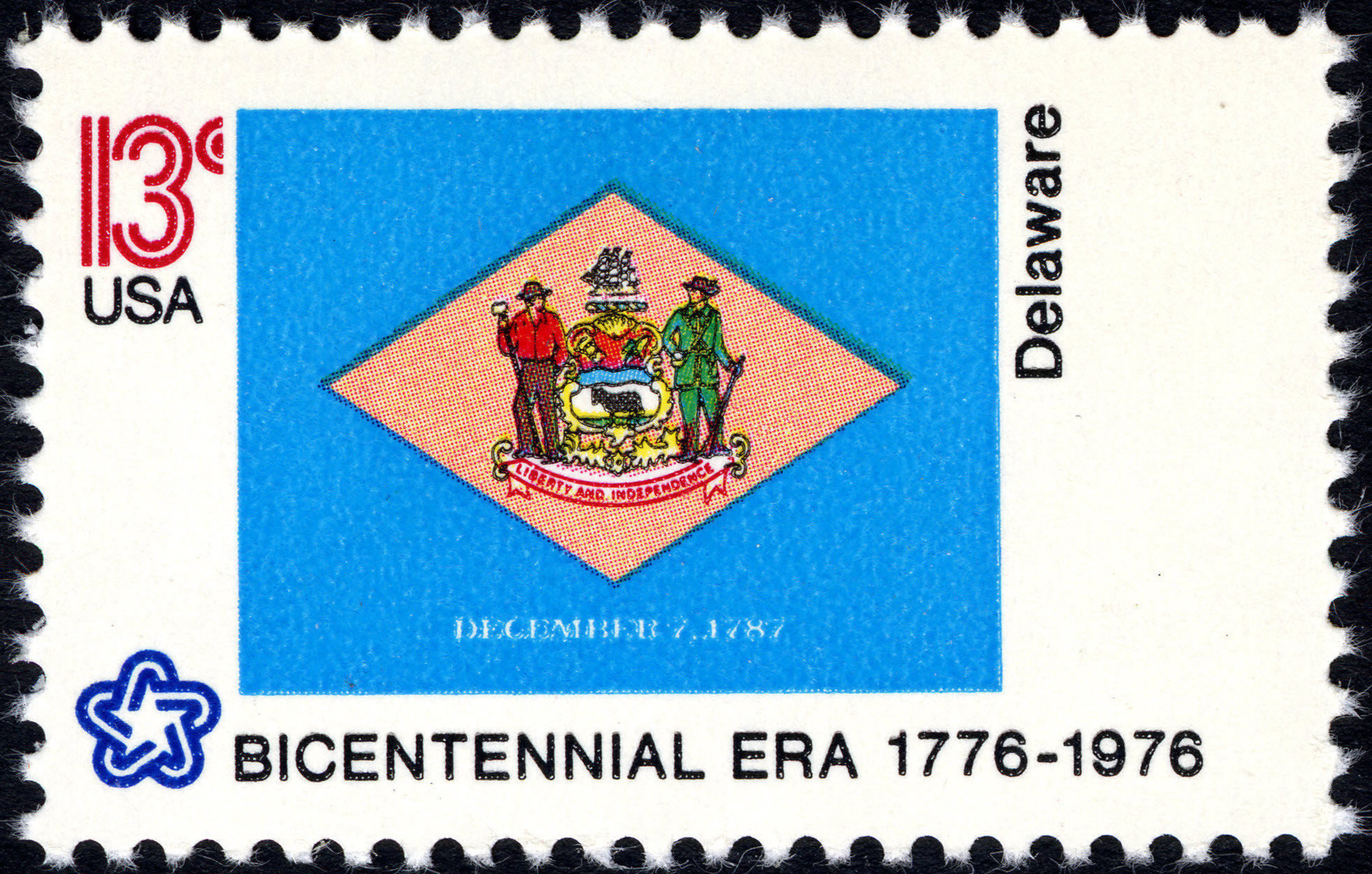
The Delaware state flag as depicted in the 1976 bicentennial postage stamp series

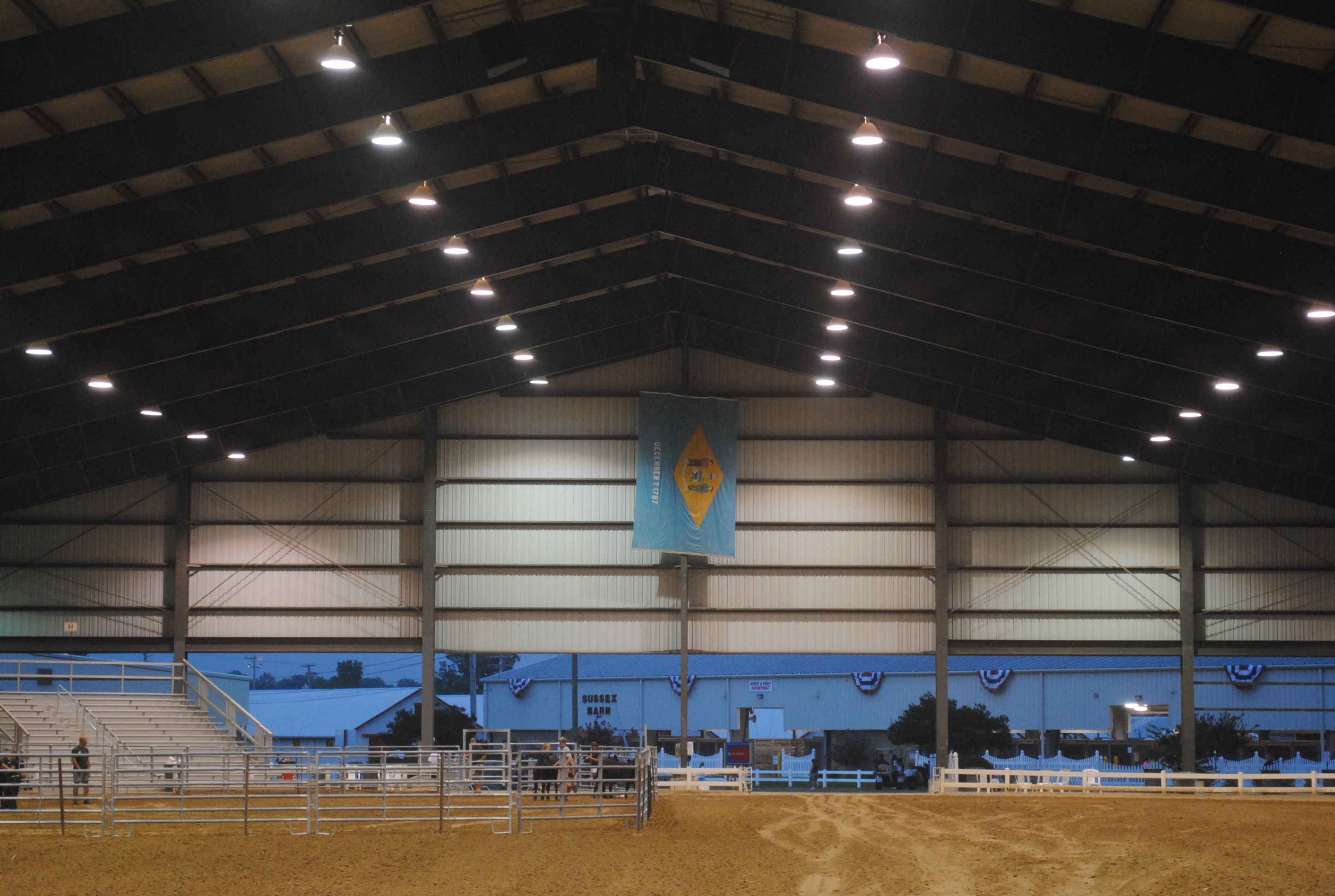
Large Delaware flag hanging inside Quillen Arena

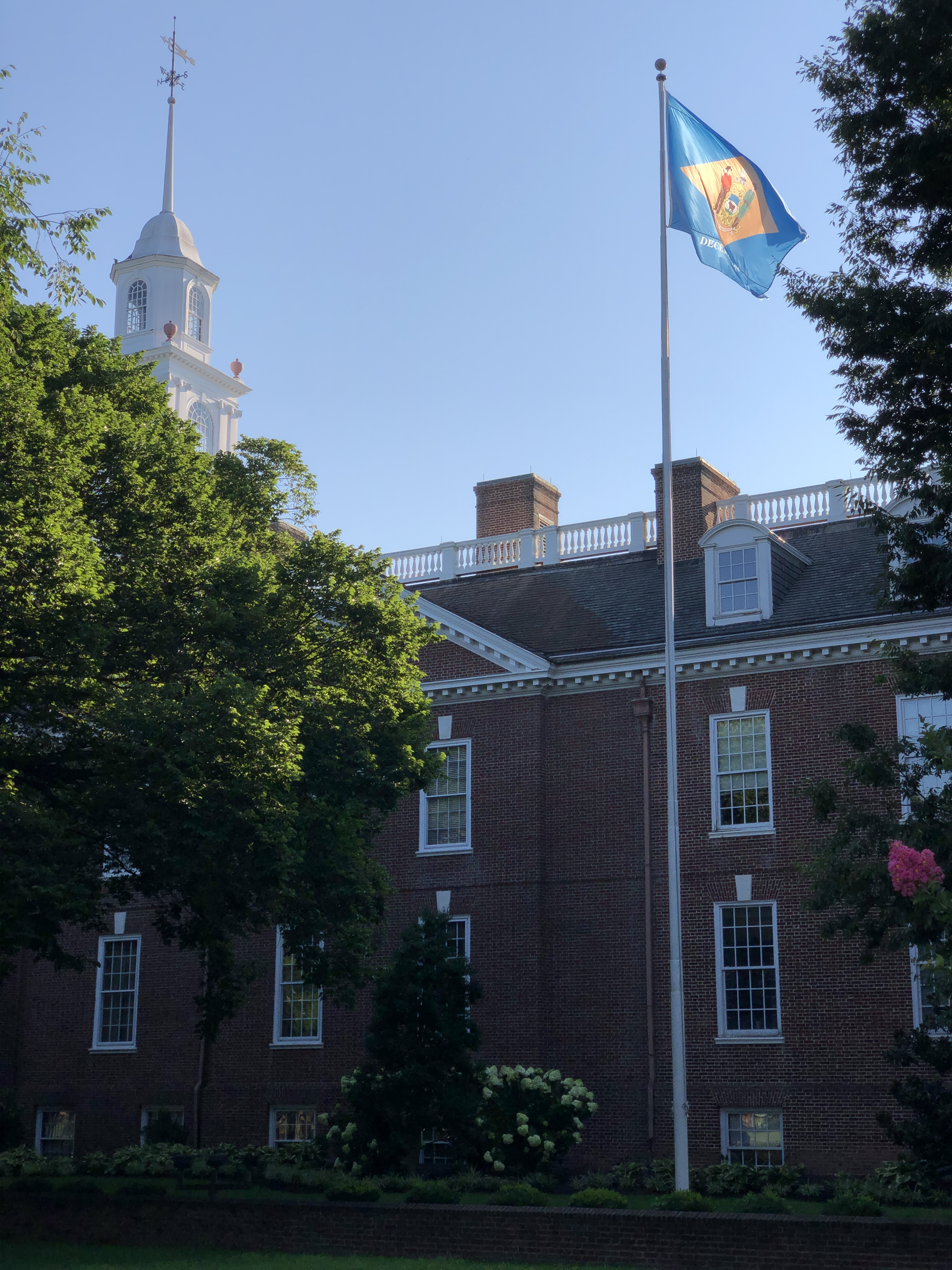
The Delaware flag flying at the Delaware Legislative Hall

== See also ==
- Symbols of the state of Delaware
