= List of U.S. state beverages =

In the United States, the first known designation of a state beverage was in 1965 with Ohio designating tomato juice as its official beverage. The most popular choice for state beverage is milk; in total, 20 out of the 32 states with official beverages have selected milk, while Rhode Island has selected a flavored milk. The District of Columbia also has an official beverage.

== Table ==
State	Drink	Year
Alabama	Clyde May’s Whiskey (state spirit)	2004
Arizona	Lemonade	2019
Arkansas	Milk	1985
Delaware	Milk	1983
Delaware	Orange Crush (state cocktail)	2024
Florida	Orange juice	1967
Hawaii	ʻAwa	2018
Indiana	Water	2007
Kentucky	Milk	2005
Louisiana (Note: In 2008, Louisiana made Sazerac the official New Orleans cocktail. Unlike state symbols which are found in Title 49 (State Administration) of the Revised Statutes, this is found in Title 33 (Municipalities and Parishes))	Milk	1983
Maine	Moxie	2005
Maryland	Milk	1998
Maryland	Rye whiskey (state spirit)	2023
Maryland	Orange Crush (state cocktail)	2025
Massachusetts	Cranberry juice	1970
Minnesota	Milk	1984
Mississippi	Milk	1984
Nebraska	Milk (state beverage)	1998
Nebraska	Kool-Aid (state soft drink)	1998
Nevada	Picon Punch (state cocktail)	2025
New Hampshire	Apple cider	2010
New Jersey	Cranberry juice (state juice)	2023
New York	Milk	1981
North Carolina	Milk	1987
North Dakota	Milk	1983
Ohio	Tomato juice	1965
Oklahoma	Milk	2002
Oregon	Milk	1997
Pennsylvania	Milk	1982
Rhode Island	Coffee milk	1993
South Carolina	Milk (state beverage)	1984
South Carolina	South Carolina-grown tea (state hospitality beverage)	1995
South Dakota	Milk	1986
Tennessee	Milk	2009
Vermont	Milk	1983
Virginia	Milk (state beverage)	1982
Virginia	George Washington's Rye Whiskey (state spirit)	2017
Washington	Coffee	2011
Wisconsin	Milk (state beverage)	1987
Wisconsin	Brandy old fashioned (state cocktail)	2023

Federal district or territory	Drink	Year
District of Columbia	Rickey	2011
