= John Hunn (farmer) =

American farmer and abolitionist (1818–1894)

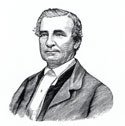

Personal details
- Born: June 25, 1818 Kent County, Delaware, U.S.
- Died: July 6, 1894 (aged 76) Camden, Delaware, U.S.
- Spouse: Mary Jenkins Swallow

John Hunn (June 25, 1818 – July 6, 1894) was an American farmer and abolitionist who was a "station master" of the Underground Railroad in Delaware, the southernmost stationmaster and responsible for slaves escaping up the Delmarva Peninsula.

== Early life and family ==
Hunn was born June 25, 1818, on Wildcat Manor near Lebanon, at the mouth of Tidbury branch in Kent County, Delaware. He was the son of Ezekiel Hunn (1774–1821) and the former Hannah Alston. His father was an abolitionist and a member of Religious Society of Friends or Quakers, but died (as did his wife) when this John Hunn was a boy. The young orphan and his siblings were raised by relatives, and his sister later convinced him to become a minister. His half-brother Ezekiel Hunn Jr. would be apprenticed to Philadelphia Quaker merchant Townsend Sharpless, whose daughter he would marry and who would later donate some papers to Swarthmore College.

Meanwhile, John Hunn decided to marry Mary Swallow, who was not a Quaker, and was accordingly expelled from his Camden, Delaware, meeting, although the Quakers relented and Mary converted to the faith, so they were allowed to transfer their membership to another meeting near their farm, "Happy Valley," near Middletown in Kent County. Their marriage survived until her death, and they had several children, as well as became stalwarts of the Appoquinimink meeting. Among their children was John Jr., later the Governor of Delaware. After Mary's death, Hunn remarried, to Anne Jenkins.

== Abolitionist ==
Assisted by his relative John Alston and Daniel Corbit of the rural area encompassing Middletown, in Kent County and Odessa in New Castle County, Delaware, as well as by Thomas Garrett and others in Wilmington further north in New Castle County, Hunn was responsible for a portion of the Underground Railroad network that transported thousands of escapees up the Delmarva Peninsula to Wilmington and thence to Pennsylvania and freedom.

In December 1845 he helped freedman Samuel Hawkins escape with his enslaved family of seven (owned by 2 masters) from slavery in Maryland. Although the slavecatchers caught the family on Hunn's farm, the local sheriff noticed a defect in the paperwork, and early in 1846 Delaware Supreme Court justice James Booth Jr. freed them based on a writ of habeas corpus sought by a fellow abolitionist (and lawyer) James Wales, and Thomas Garrett quickly called a coach to take them across the border into Pennsylvania. The displeased slaveholders then sued Hunn and Garrett for violating the Fugitive Slave Act in the U.S. District Court in the New Castle Court House. After a trial presided over by U.S. Supreme Court Chief Justice Roger B. Taney and District Judge Willard Hall, both Hunn and Garrett were convicted and fined heavily. Prosecutor James A. Bayard Jr. reportedly told Hunn the fines would not be imposed if he would promise not to continue his efforts to aid fugitives escaping from slavery, but Hunn "vowed never to withhold a helping hand from the down-trodden in their hour of distress." His land holdings and all his possessions were sold at sheriff's sale in mid-1848. Although his family was left utterly destitute, Hunn continued his efforts to abolish slavery.

Following this eviction, he lived for a time with relatives in Magnolia in Kent County. During the Civil War, Hunn could not serve in the military because of his faith, but afterward moved with his family to the Sea Islands of South Carolina to work with the Freedmen's Bureau in Port Royal, South Carolina, and as a customs officer in Beaufort, South Carolina.

== Death and legacy ==
Hunn died July 6, 1894, at Camden in Kent County, where he was living with his son John Hunn Jr. (who had moved back to Delaware in 1876 and later became Delaware's governor) and is buried at the Camden Friends Meetinghouse.

Because of his modesty, or to protect others from possible retaliation as interracial tensions remained high, on his deathbed Hunn asked his son John to burn his papers. Some were retained by other correspondents, including William Still in Philadelphia, who published an account of some of Hunn's activities. The ancestral Hunn home, Wildcat Manor, is now part of a mostly-nature park ("Hunn Park") administered by Kent County Parks and Recreation. A loop of the federal Underground Railroad historic trail in Delaware visits sites associated with Hunn and his father (who assisted Harriet Tubman). Delaware has erected a historical marker honoring Hunn in Camden near his grave site.
