= 1900 Delaware gubernatorial election =

- November 6, 1900
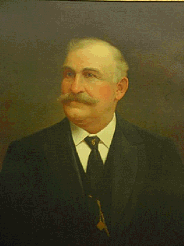
Nominee	John Hunn	Peter J. Ford
Party	Republican	Democratic
Popular vote	22,421	18,802
Percentage	53.57%	44.93%
- County results Hunn: 50–60%
Governor before election
Ebe W. Tunnell
Democratic
Elected Governor
John Hunn
Republican

The 1900 Delaware gubernatorial election was held on November 6, 1900. Though Governor Ebe W. Tunnell was eligible for re-election under the newly adopted 1897 constitution, the state convention ended up nominating Peter J. Ford, a prominent businessman.

On the Republican side, the split from four years earlier threatened to divide the party once again. The Addicks and anti-Addicks Republicans nominated separate candidates for Governor. The anti-Addicks (or "Regular Republicans") nominated attorney Martin B. Burris, while the Addicks (or "Union Republicans") nominated Dr. George W. Marshall. Both factions, however, nominated John Hunn for Lieutenant Governor.

Though initial negotiations between the factions failed to produce a reconciliation, a tentative agreement developed to form a joint ticket, adopting Hunn as a compromise for Governor splitting nominations for statewide offices between the two factions. Ultimately, the parties came to an agreement, and a joint ticket was nominated for the general election.

In the general election, Hunn ended up defeating Ford by a decisive margin, reclaiming the governorship for the Republican Party. Republicans would hold onto the office until 1936.

== General election ==
1900 Delaware gubernatorial election
Party	Candidate	Votes	%	±%
Republican	John Hunn	22,421	53.57%	+33.18%
Democratic	Peter J. Ford	18,802	44.93%	+0.72%
Prohibition	Richard M. Cooper	574	1.37%	−1.07%
Socialist	Gustave E. Reinike	54	0.13%	—
Majority		3,619	8.65%	−4.16%
Turnout		41,851	100.00%	
Republican gain from Democratic				

== Bibliography ==
- Delaware Senate Journal, 88th General Assembly, 1st Reg. Sess. (1901).
