= George Beswick Hynson =

American lawyer

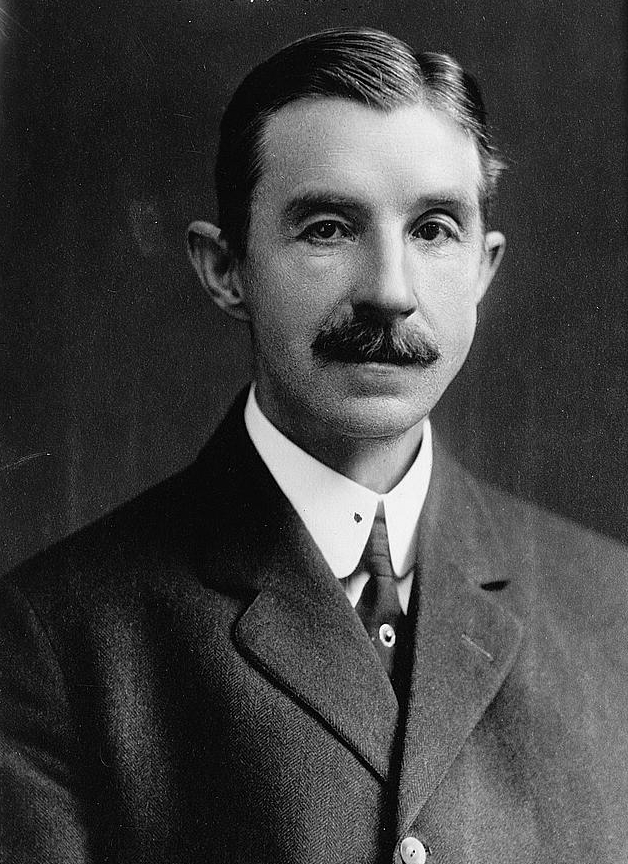
George Beswick Hynson circa 1912

George Beswick Hynson Sr. (April 2, 1862 – December 5, 1926) was an American lawyer, writer, poet, and newspaper editor at the Peninsula News and Advertiser. He was the Progressive Party candidate for the Governor of Delaware in 1912.

== Biography ==
He was born in Milford, Delaware on April 2, 1862, to Garrett Lee Hynson and Ellen Postles. He taught elocution at the University of Pennsylvania in 1897. He was the author of the state song, Our Delaware. He later worked as a head of an advertising company in Philadelphia, where he died in 1926. He was buried in the Odd Fellows Cemetery in Delaware.

== Publications ==
- The Practical Treatment of Stammering and Stuttering: With Suggestions for Practice and Helpful Exercises (1902) with George Andrew Lewis
- Advanced Elocution (1896) with Mrs. J. W. Shoemaker and John Hendricks Bechtel

Party political offices
First Progressive Party established	Progressive nominee for Governor of Delaware; 1912	Succeeded by none
