= Our Delaware =

Song

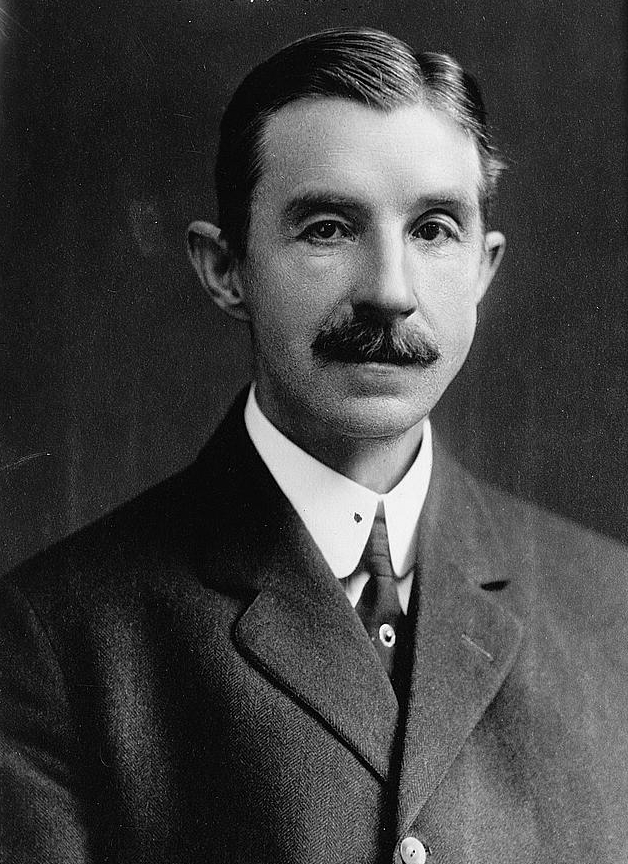
George Beswick Hynson wrote the lyrics to 'Our Delaware'

Our Delaware is a poem written by George Beswick Hynson, published in 1904. It comprises three verses, each honoring one of Delaware's three counties, with the fourth verse added by Donn Devine commemorating the American Revolution Bicentennial in 1976. It became the state song in 1925 by an act of the General Assembly. The musical score was composed by Will M. S. Brown specifically for the poem.

== Lyrics ==
=== Verse 1 ===
Oh the hills of dear New Castle,
And the smiling vales between,
When the corn is all in tassel,
And the meadowlands are green;
Where the cattle crop the clover,
And its breath is in the air,
While the sun is shining over
Our beloved Delaware.

=== Chorus ===
Oh, our Delaware!
Our beloved Delaware!
For the sun is shining over
Our beloved Delaware,
Oh! our Delaware!
Our beloved Delaware!
Here's the loyal son that pledges,
Faith to good old Delaware.

=== Verse 2 ===
Where the wheat fields break and billow,
In the peaceful land of Kent,
Where the toiler seeks his pillow,
With the blessings of content;
Where the bloom that tints the peaches,
Cheeks of merry maidens share,
And the woodland chorus preaches
A rejoicing Delaware.

(repeat chorus)

=== Verse 3 ===
Dear old Sussex visions linger,
Of the holly and pine,
Of Henlopen's Jeweled finger,
Flashing out across the brine;
Of the gardens and hedges,
And the welcome waiting there,
For the loyal son that pledges
Faith to good old Delaware.

(repeat chorus)

=== Verse 4 ===
From New Castle's rolling meadows,
Through the fair rich fields of Kent,
To the Sussex shores hear echoes,
Of the pledge we now present:
"Liberty and Independence",
We will guard with loyal care,
And hold fast to freedom's presence,
In our home state Delaware.

(repeat chorus)
