= Orange Crush (cocktail) =

Mixed drink of vodka, triple sec, orange juice, lemon-lime soda

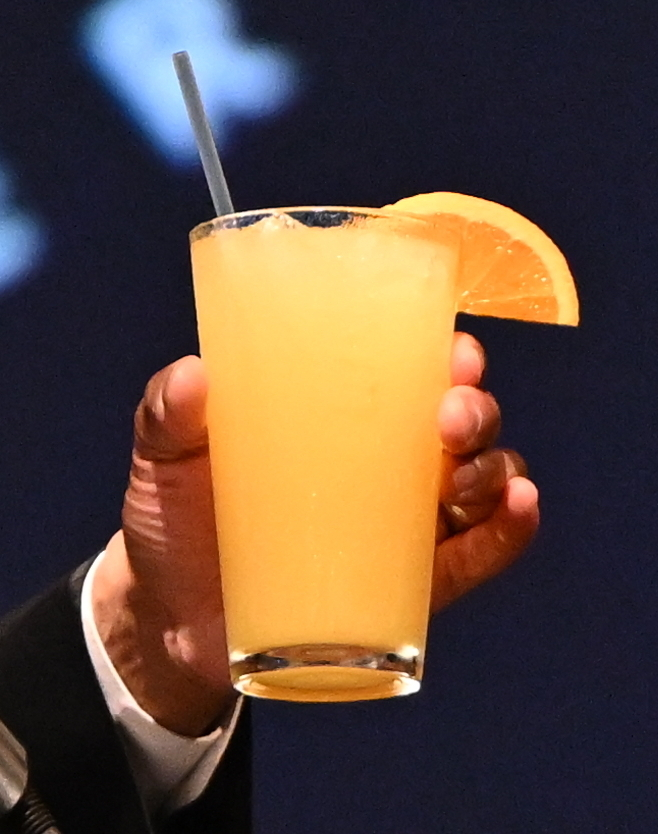
- Type: Cocktail
- Ingredients: 2 oz. vodka; 1 oz. triple sec; 3 oz. orange juice; Splash lemon-lime soda
- Base spirit: Vodka, Triple sec
- Preparation: Add vodka, triple sec, orange juice to a glass filled with ice. Top with a splash of lemon-lime soda and mix well. Garnish with orange peel or orange slice.

Orange Crush is a cocktail made of vodka, triple sec, orange juice, and lemon-lime soda.

== Preparation ==
Add 2 oz. vodka, 2 oz. triple sec, and 1/3 cup orange juice to a pint glass filled with ice. Top with a splash of lemon-lime soda and serve immediately.

== History ==
The Orange Crush cocktail was invented at the Harborside Bar & Grill in West Ocean City, Maryland, in 1995 as a concoction of vodka, freshly squeezed oranges, and triple sec, topped off with a splash of lemon-lime soda.

In August 2024, the Orange Crush became the official state cocktail of Delaware. The legislation signed by Governor John Carney acknowledged the drink's Maryland origin but said that it was "made famous" and "perfected" at The Starboard in Dewey Beach, Delaware. In May 2025, Governor Wes Moore signed a bill designating the Orange Crush as the official state cocktail of Maryland, effective June 1.

== See also ==
- List of cocktails
