= Colen Ferguson =

American politician (??–1917)

4th Lieutenant Governor of Delaware
- In office January 21, 1913 – January 16, 1917
- Governor: Charles R. Miller
- Preceded by: John M. Mendinhall
- Succeeded by: Lewis E. Eliason

Personal details
- Died: August 6, 1917 (aged 82) Blackbird, Delaware, U.S.
- Party: Democratic

Colen Ferguson (died August 6, 1917) was an American politician who served as the fourth Lieutenant Governor of Delaware, from January 21, 1913, to January 16, 1917, under Governor Charles R. Miller.

Ferguson was a member of the Delaware Senate for the Democratic Party. He died aged 82 at his farm in Blackbird on August 6, 1917.

Political offices
Preceded by John M. Mendinhall	Lieutenant Governor of Delaware; 1913–1917	Succeeded by Lewis E. Eliason
