= Isaac T. Parker =

American politician

Isaac Thomas Parker (September 27, 1849 – March 6, 1911) was an American politician who served as the second Lieutenant Governor of Delaware, from January 17, 1905, to January 19, 1909, under Governor Preston Lea.

Political offices
Preceded by Philip L. Cannon	Lieutenant Governor of Delaware; 1905–1909	Succeeded by John M. Mendinhall
