= Seal of Delaware =

Official government emblem of the United States state of Delaware

- Armiger: State of Delaware
- Adopted: January 17, 1777
- Motto: Liberty and Independence

The great seal of the state of Delaware was first adopted on January 17, 1777, with the current version being adopted April 29, 2004. It contains the state coat of arms surrounded by an inscription.

== Coat of arms ==
Coat of arms of the State of Delaware

Versions
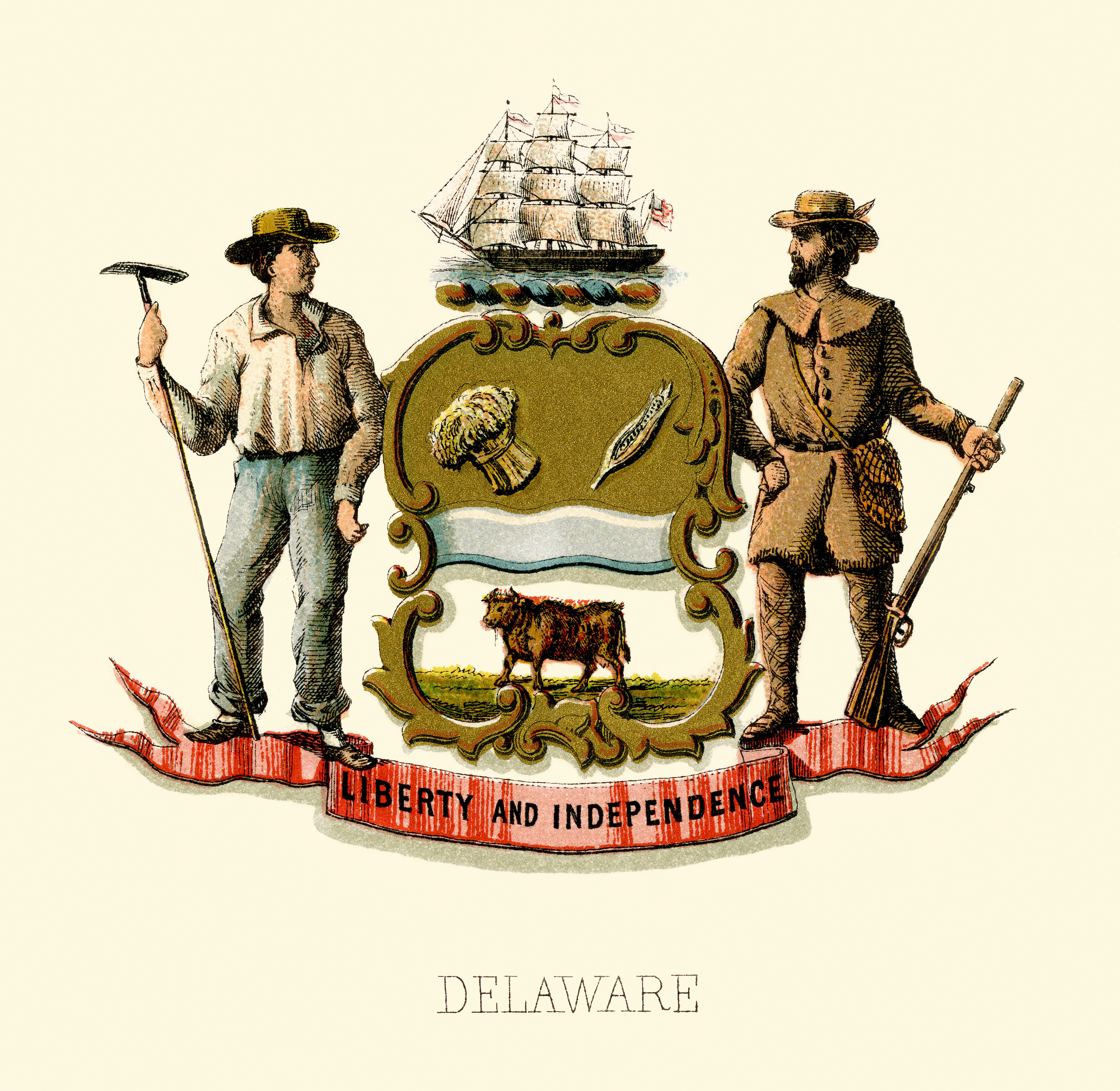
- Historical coat of arms (illustrated, 1876)
- Armiger: State of Delaware
- Adopted: January 17, 1777
- Crest: On a wreath azure and argent, a ship under full sail, proper
- Shield: Party per fess, or and argent, the first charged with a garb (wheat sheaf) in bend dexter and an ear of maize (Indian Corn) in bend sinister, both proper; the second charged with an ox statant, ruminating, proper; fess, wavy azure
- Supporters: On the dexter a husbandman with a hilling hoe, on the sinister a rifleman armed and accoutered at ease
- Motto: Liberty and Independence

At the center of the coat of arms is a shield of horizontal orange, blue and white stripes. On the orange stripe is a sheaf of wheat and a cob of corn. On the white stripe is an ox standing on grass. Above the shield is a sailing ship. Supporting the shield are a farmer on the left and a rifleman on the right. Underneath the shield is the state motto.

- The sheaf of wheat is taken from the Sussex County seal and signifies the agricultural vitality of the state.
- The ear of corn was taken from the Kent County seal and symbolizes the agricultural basis of the state's economy.
- The fess azure, above the ox, represents the Delaware River, the main stay of the state's commerce and transportation.
- The ox represents the importance of animal husbandry to the state's economy.
- The ship is a symbol of New Castle County's ship building industry and the state's extensive coastal commerce.
- The farmer with the hoe represents the central role of farming to the state.
- The soldier, a militiaman with his musket, recognizes the crucial role of the citizen-soldier to the maintenance of American liberties.
- The motto "Liberty and Independence" was provided by the Order of the Cincinnati, a hereditary organization of American Revolutionary War officers, formed in 1783.

=== Inscription ===
The surrounding inscription reads: "Great Seal of the State of Delaware" and the dates 1704, 1776 and 1787.

- The Lower Counties on the Delaware Bay established their own General Assembly in 1704;
- Separation Day, June 15, 1776, was the day the colonial General Assembly declared Delaware an independent state;
- Delaware Day, December 7, 1787, was the day Delaware ratified the United States Constitution, being the first state to do so.

== History ==
The seal was originally adopted in 1777 with minor changes made in 1793, 1847, and 1907. The current version was adopted in 2004.

- From 1793 until 1847 the figures of the farmer and the soldier were eliminated from the seal.
- In 1847 the motto "Liberty and Independence," was added on a ribbon underneath the shield.
- In 1907 the seal was "modernized" and "THE DELAWARE STATE" was changed to "THE STATE OF DELAWARE".

== Blazon ==
The seal now used as the Great Seal of this State and bearing the arms of this State shall be the Great Seal of this State. It is emblazoned as follows: Party per fess, or and argent, the first charged with a garb (wheat sheaf) in bend dexter and an ear of maize (Indian Corn) in bend sinister, both proper; the second charged with an ox statant, ruminating, proper; fess, wavy azure, supporters on the dexter a husbandman with a hilling hoe, on the sinister a rifleman armed and accoutered at ease. Crest, on a wreath azure and argent, a ship under full sail, proper, with the words "Great Seal of the State of Delaware," the dates "1704, 1776, and 1787," and the words "Liberty and Independence" engraved thereon.

== Seal of the Governor ==
Seal of Jack Markell, Governor of Delaware (2009–2017)

Seal of Ruth Ann Minner, Governor of Delaware (2001–2009)

== Government seals of Delaware ==
Seal of the Supreme Court of Delaware

== See also ==
- Flag of Delaware
