= Simeon S. Pennewill =

American politician (1867–1935)

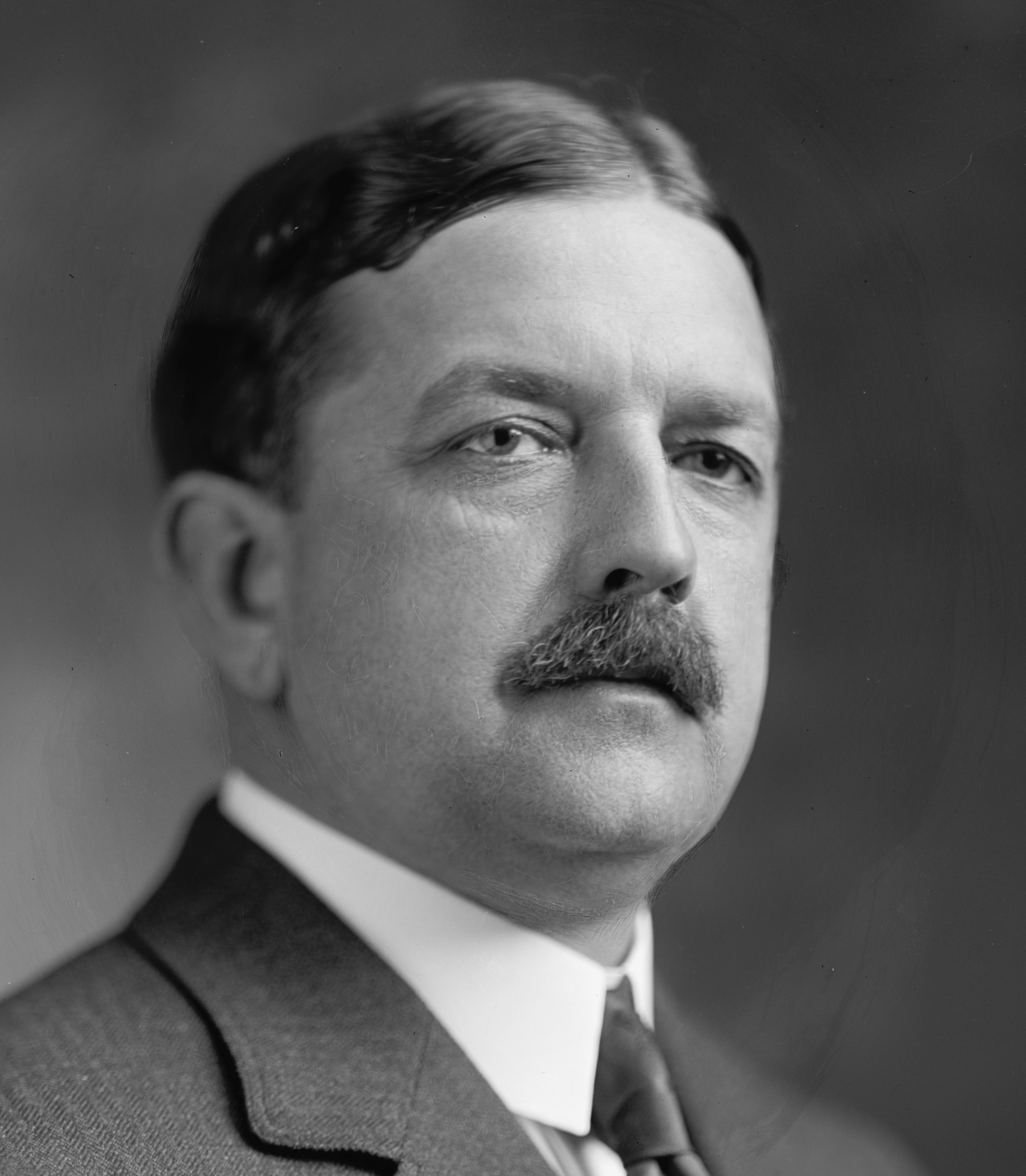

53rd Governor of Delaware
- In office January 19, 1909 – January 21, 1913
- Lieutenant: John M. Mendinhall
- Preceded by: Preston Lea
- Succeeded by: Charles R. Miller

Member of the Delaware Senate
- In office January 10, 1899 – January 8, 1907

Personal details
- Born: July 23, 1867 Greenwood, Delaware, U.S.
- Died: September 10, 1935 (aged 68) Dover, Delaware, U.S.
- Party: Republican
- Spouse(s): Lydia Wright Elder; Elizabeth Halsey
- Occupation: farmer

Simeon Selby Pennewill (July 23, 1867 – September 10, 1935) was an American farmer and politician from Dover, in Kent County, Delaware. He was a member of the Republican Party, who served in the Delaware General Assembly and as Governor of Delaware.

== Early life and family ==
Pennewill was born near Greenwood, Delaware, son of Simeon and Ann Curry Pennewill. The elder Simeon was one of the larger peach growers and owned the land that later became the town of Greenwood. He was also active in the Republican Party and served in the Governor's Guard during the Civil War. Simeon, the younger, was educated at Wilmington Conference Academy, now Wesley College in Dover. He married, later in life, after he served as governor, first in 1920, Lydia Wright Elder, and second in 1927, Elizabeth Halsey. There were no children by either marriage. They lived at 228 North State Street in Dover and he was a member of the Methodist Church.

== Professional and political career ==
Pennewill inherited and continued to operate his family's peach orchards in Greenwood and Bridgeville. Pennewill was elected to two terms in the Delaware State Senate and served from the 1899/1900 session through the 1905/06 session.

== Governor of Delaware ==
He then was elected Governor of Delaware by defeating Rowland G. Paynter, the Democratic Party candidate and served one term from January 19, 1909 until January 21, 1913. Like his predecessor, Pennewill began his career as an Addicks Republican, but was dedicated to reuniting the party.

The Delaware General Assembly at this time approved the sale of the Chesapeake and Delaware Canal to the Federal government, and passed the Boulevard Corporation Act, which provided the legal authority for T. Coleman du Pont to begin to build his privately funded highway the length of the state.

Delaware's antiquated whipping post again received embarrassing national attention. Out of state pressure forced Pennewill to reduce the number of lashings given in one sentence, but the pressure seemed to only intensify local opinion in favor of the use of the whipping post. He also made a controversial appointment to his elder brother, James Pennewill, the position of Chief Justice of Delaware. His brother served until his death 26 years later in 1935. It was during Pennewill's term that DuPont lost its antitrust suit and was forced to divest itself of what became the Hercules Powder and Atlas Powder Companies.

Delaware General Assembly (sessions while governor)
Year	Assembly	Senate Majority	President pro tempore	House Majority	Speaker
1909–1910	95th	Republican	George W. Sparks	Democratic	Thomas O. Cooper
1911–1912	96th	Democratic	Thomas M. Monaghan	Republican	Denward W. Campbell

== Death and legacy ==
Pennewill died at Dover and is buried in the Bridgeville Methodist Cemetery at Bridgeville, Delaware.

== Almanac ==
Elections are held the first Tuesday after November 1. Members of the Delaware General Assembly take office the second Tuesday of January. State Senators have a four-year term. The governor takes office the third Tuesday of January and has a four-year term.

Public Offices
Office	Type	Location	Began office	Ended office	notes
State Senator	Legislature	Dover	January 10, 1899	January 13, 1903	
State Senator	Legislature	Dover	January 13, 1903	January 8, 1907	
Governor	Executive	Dover	January 19, 1909	January 21, 1913	

Delaware General Assembly service
Dates	Assembly	Chamber	Majority	Governor	Committees	District
1899–1900	90th	State Senate	Democratic	Ebe Tunnell		Sussex 1st
1901–1902	91st	State Senate	Republican	John Hunn		Sussex 1st
1903–1904	92nd	State Senate	Republican	John Hunn		Sussex 1st
1905–1906	93rd	State Senate	Republican	Preston Lea		Sussex 1st

Election results
Year	Office	Subject	Party	Votes	%	Opponent	Party	Votes	%
1908	Governor	Simeon S. Pennewill	Republican	24,905	52%	Rowland G. Paynter	Democratic	22,794	48%

== Images ==
- Hall of Governors Portrait Gallery ; Portrait courtesy of Historical and Cultural Affairs, Dover.

== Places with more information ==
- Delaware Historical Society; website; 505 North Market Street, Wilmington, Delaware 19801; (302) 655-7161
- University of Delaware; Library website; 181 South College Avenue, Newark, Delaware 19717; (302) 831-2965

Party political offices
Preceded by Joseph H. Chandler	Republican nominee for Governor of Delaware; 1908	Succeeded by Charles R. Miller
Political offices
Preceded by Preston Lea	Governor of Delaware; 1909–1913	Succeeded by Charles R. Miller
