= Charles R. Miller (politician) =

American politician (1857–1927)

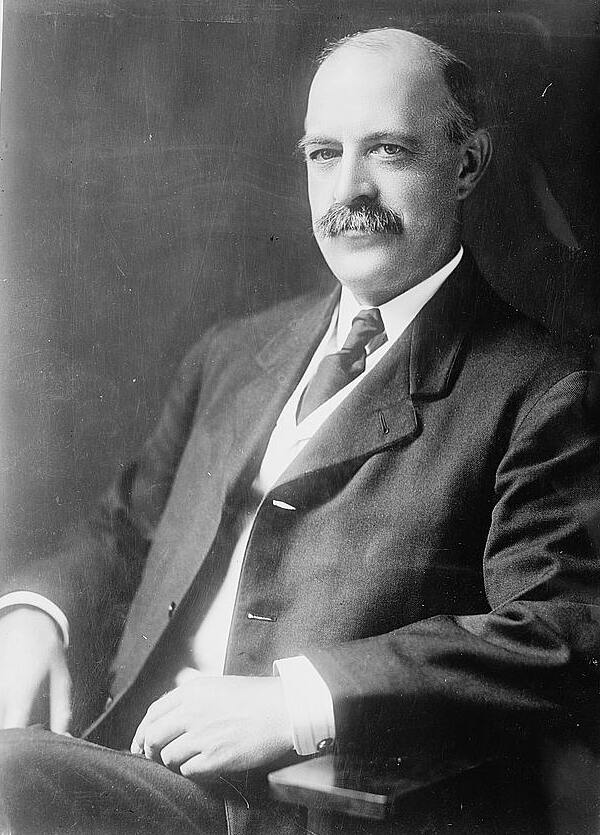
- Miller, c. 1913

54th Governor of Delaware
- In office January 21, 1913 – January 16, 1917
- Lieutenant: Colen Ferguson
- Preceded by: Simeon S. Pennewill
- Succeeded by: John G. Townsend Jr.

Member of the Delaware Senate
- In office January 6, 1911 - January 7, 1913

Personal details
- Born: Charles Robert Miller; September 30, 1857 West Chester, Pennsylvania, U.S.
- Died: September 18, 1927 (aged 69) Berlin, New Jersey, U.S.
- Party: Republican
- Spouse: Abigail Morgan Woodnutt (m. 1874)
- Education: Swarthmore College University of Pennsylvania Law School
- Profession: Lawyer
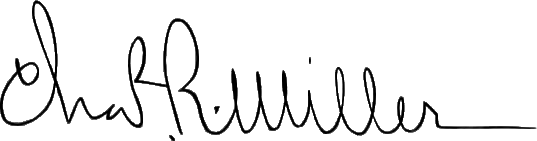
- Signature

Charles Robert Miller (September 30, 1857 – September 18, 1927) was an American lawyer and politician from Wilmington, Delaware. He was a member of the Republican Party, who served in the Delaware General Assembly and as Governor of Delaware.

== Life and career ==
Miller was born on September 30, 1857, in West Chester, Pennsylvania, the son of Margaretta (Black) and Robert Miller. He graduated from Swarthmore College in 1879 and the University of Pennsylvania Law School in 1881. He had married Abigail Morgan Woodnutt in 1874 and they had three children, Thomas W., Clement W., and Mrs. Forest Willard. Charles and family were members of the Episcopal Church. Shortly afterwards he came to Delaware as a lawyer for the Wilmington Malleable Iron Company. Miller served one term in the Delaware State Senate, during the 1911/1912 session. After he left state office he practiced law in Wilmington and was president of the Wilmington Farmer's Bank.

=== Governor of Delaware ===
Miller was elected Governor of Delaware in 1912 by defeating Thomas M. Monaghan, the Democratic Party candidate. 1912 was a Democratic sweep, except for Miller's narrow victory, perhaps attributed to the fact that Monaghan, his opponent, was a Roman Catholic.

During his term ferry service was initiated between New Castle, Delaware, and Penns Grove, New Jersey, and the Lewes and Rehoboth Canal was built. Women were also first admitted to Delaware College. The major event, however, was the outbreak of World War I in Europe and the effect in Delaware of the rapid expansion of demand for gunpowder. At the war's commencement, Miller and his wife were on a German passenger ship, and after an exciting chase up the English Channel, he and others persuaded the German captain to give up his ship to his British pursuers.

== Death and legacy ==
Miller died while visiting a friend at Berlin, New Jersey, and is buried in the Wilmington and Brandywine Cemetery at Wilmington. His son, Thomas W. Miller, was the U.S. representative from Delaware during the last two years of his term. His grandson, Clement W. Miller, was a U.S. representative from California from 1959 until 1962.

Delaware General Assembly (sessions while Governor)
Year	Assembly	Senate Majority	President pro tempore	House Majority	Speaker
1913–1914	97th	Republican	George W. Marshall	Republican	Chauncey P. Holcomb
1915–1916	98th	Republican	John M. Walker	Republican	Charles H. Grantland

== Almanac ==
Elections are held the first Tuesday after November 1. Members of the Delaware General Assembly take office the second Tuesday of January. State senators have a four-year term. The governor takes office the third Tuesday of January and has a four-year term.

Public Offices
Office	Type	Location	Began office	Ended office	notes
State Senator	Legislature	Dover	January 6, 1911	January 6, 1913	
Governor	Executive	Dover	January 21, 1913	January 16, 1917	

Delaware General Assembly service
Dates	Assembly	Chamber	Majority	Governor	Committees	District
1911–1912	96th	State Senate	Democratic	Simeon S. Pennewill		New Castle 1st

Election results
Year	Office	Subject	Party	Votes	%	Opponent	Party	Votes	%
1912	Governor	Charles R. Miller	Republican	22,745	47%	Thomas M. Monaghan; George B. Hynson	Democratic; Progressive	21,460; 3,019	44% 6%

== Images ==
- Hall of Governors Portrait Gallery ; Portrait courtesy of Historical and Cultural Affairs, Dover.

== Places with more information ==
- Delaware Historical Society; website; 505 North Market Street, Wilmington, Delaware 19801; (302) 655-7161
- University of Delaware; Library website; 181 South College Avenue, Newark, Delaware 19717; (302) 831-2965

Party political offices
Preceded by Simeon S. Pennewill	Republican nominee for Governor of Delaware; 1912	Succeeded by John G. Townsend Jr.
Political offices
Preceded by Simeon S. Pennewill	Governor of Delaware; 1913–1917	Succeeded by John G. Townsend Jr.
