= John Hunn (politician) =

American politician (1849–1926)

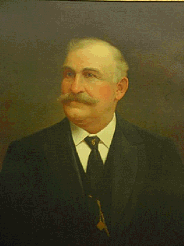

51st Governor of Delaware
- In office January 15, 1901 – January 17, 1905
- Lieutenant: Philip L. Cannon
- Preceded by: Ebe W. Tunnell
- Succeeded by: Preston Lea

Personal details
- Born: June 23, 1849 Odessa, Delaware, US
- Died: September 1, 1926 (aged 77) Camden, Delaware, US
- Party: Republican
- Spouse: Sarah Cowgill Emerson (m. 1874)
- Children: 1
- Occupation: businessman

John Hunn (June 23, 1849 – September 1, 1926) was an American businessman and politician from Camden, Delaware. The first governor elected after a reform of Delaware's state constitution and a compromise candidate, Hunn served from 1901 until 1905 and became the first of a multi-decade string of elected Republican Delaware governors.

== Early life and family ==
Hunn was born in June 1849 near Odessa, Delaware, son of Quaker minister and farmer John and his initially non-Quaker wife Mary Swallow Hunn.

Hunn's father, also John Hunn, was a noted abolitionist and superintendent of the Underground Railroad on the Delmarva Peninsula south of Wilmington, Delaware, the southernmost stationmaster in the United States. Shortly after the younger John's birth, the family lost their New Castle County farm, "Happy Valley," in a sheriff's sale because of $2500 in fines assessed against him by Supreme Court Justice Roger Taney in 1848 for helping a family of seven runaway slaves and their freedman father, although Delaware's chief justice in the original 1846 case had granted a writ of habeas corpus, freed the alleged slaves, and fellow abolitionist (and later co-defendant) Thomas Garrett called a coach to take them to Pennsylvania. The Hunn family then went to live with relatives at Magnolia, Delaware, and this John Hunn was educated at the Friends school in Camden, Delaware and later at the Friends School in Bordentown, New Jersey.

After the American Civil War (during which members as Quakers could not serve in the military), the Hunn family moved to the Sea Islands of South Carolina where the elder Hunn and his schoolteacher daughter Eliza assisted freed blacks, and his father also helped collect customs duties at Beaufort. The younger John Hunn married Sarah Cowgill Emerson in 1874, and they had one child, Alice. They lived at 3 South Main Street in Camden and were members of the Camden Friends Meeting.

== Career ==
The younger Hunn, known as "Honest John", grew up at Magnolia and Port Royal, South Carolina, where his father was working with the Freedmen's Bureau as well as collected customs duties. In 1876 this John Hunn returned to Delaware, permanently settled in Camden in Kent County (where he had attended school as a child) and began operating a merchandized fruit, lumber, and lime business in nearby Wyoming. He maintained this business throughout his life.

At the turn of the twentieth century Delaware was going through a political transformation. Most obvious to the public was the unprecedented division in the Republican Party caused, in part, by the ambitions of J. Edward "Gas" Addicks for a seat in the U.S. Senate. A gas company industrialist from Philadelphia, Pennsylvania, Addicks spent vast sums to build a Republican Party devoted to him. Largely successful in heavily Democratic Kent County and Sussex County, Addicks-financed a faction that came to be known as the "Union Republicans." Meanwhile, he made bitter enemies of the New Castle County "Regular Republicans," who considered him nothing more than a carpetbagger from Philadelphia.

Behind the headlines, however, all the effort was making obvious the archaic and corrupt practices that characterized elections and the resultant state government. This caused a consensus to develop that major reform was needed in all areas of state government, but especially in voting procedures, apportionment, and the assignment of various responsibilities to the governor, legislature, and judiciary. The result of the all this was the Constitution of 1897 and the return of two-party politics to Delaware. It also created a statewide, moderately progressive, Republican Party, which become a statewide majority, particularly after the highly personal Addicks controversy ended in 1905.

== Governor of Delaware ==
Hunn was to be an early beneficiary of these developments. As a political newcomer but descended from a long-respected Delaware family and a successful businessman in his own right, Hunn became a compromise candidate acceptable to all Republicans. Running in opposition to the Roman Catholic Wilmington leather merchant, Peter J. Ford, Hunn was able to take advantage of the conservative Democrats, discomfort with Catholicism, as well as their dislike of the national presidential candidate, populist William Jennings Bryan. Hunn handily won the election in 1900 and began a period of Republican occupancy of the Governor's office that lasted for all but eight of the next 60 years.

Hunn became the first governor elected under Delaware's new Constitution of 1897. As such he enjoyed an authority unknown to governors since colonial times. He also became the first governor of Delaware to be eligible to serve for two terms. Most importantly, Hunn was the first governor with authority to veto General Assembly bills; including line-item veto power on appropriations bills. Hunn was also the first governor to serve with an elected lieutenant governor.

Along with changes to the Governor's authority, the new Constitution modified the General Assembly's duties so that it too became more effective. Finally, the responsibility for granting divorces was moved to the courts. Along with the requirement for creating a general incorporation law, the General Assembly eventually produced an incorporation law that laid the basis for the state becoming the preferred national incorporation location with all its associated revenues. During this time, the General Assembly finally ratified the Thirteenth Amendment, Fourteenth Amendment, and Fifteenth Amendment to the U.S. Constitution, thirty-one years after they became law. In spite of all this progress, the General Assembly was unable to resolve the Addicks issue until 1903, with the nationally embarrassing result that Delaware spent two years with no representation at all in the U.S. Senate. Also, Governor Hunn appointed one of Addicks' supporters, Dr. Caleb R. Layton, as secretary of state, which was controversial, although Layton performed his job well and later worked for the U.S. State Department and was elected to the U.S. House of Representatives.

Hunn was the first governor to seek the admission of women to the Delaware College, now the University of Delaware, and to recommend that a paved highway be constructed the entire length of the state. Delaware's legislature also passed (and Gov. Hunn signed) a law that secured protecting wildlife, and another that initiated and sustained the construction of free public libraries.

Delaware General Assembly (sessions while Governor)
Year	Assembly	Senate Majority	President pro tempore	House Majority	Speaker
1901–1902	91st	Republican	Henry C. Ellison	Republican	James V. McCommons
1903–1904	92nd	Republican	Henry C. Ellison	Republican	Henry S. Anthony

== Death and legacy ==
After his term ended, Hunn returned full-time to his business. He also became vice president of Dover's First National Bank, and was director of Dover's National Building and Loan Association. He died at Camden and is buried there at the Camden Friends Meetinghouse, along with his wife and parents. A road off U.S. Route 13 and Loockerman Street in Dover is named for him, as well as one in the Manor Park development in New Castle. The ancestral Hunn family home, Wildcat Manor, in 2016 became part of Hunn Nature Park, managed by Kent County. It is also on a loop of the Harriet Tubman Underground Railroad byway, commemorating this Hunn's grandfather who assisted Harriet Tubman, as well as the work of this Hunn's father.

== Almanac ==
Elections are held the first Tuesday after November 1. The governor takes office the third Tuesday of January and has a four-year term.

Public Offices
Office	Type	Location	Began office	Ended office	notes
Governor	Executive	Dover	January 15, 1901	January 17, 1905	

Election results
Year	Office	Subject	Party	Votes	%	Opponent	Party	Votes	%
1900	Governor	John Hunn	Republican	22,421	53%	Peter J. Ford	Democratic	18,808	45%

== Bibliography ==
- Carter, Richard B. (2001). Clearing New Ground, The Life of John G. Townsend, Jr. Wilmington, Delaware: The Delaware Heritage Press. ISBN 0-924117-20-6.
- Conrad, Henry C. (1908). History of the State of Delaware. Lancaster, Pennsylvania: Wickersham Company.
- Martin, Roger A. (1984). History of Delaware Through its Governors. Wilmington, Delaware: McClafferty Press.
- Munroe, John A. (1993). History of Delaware. Newark, Delaware: University of Delaware Press. ISBN 0-87413-493-5.
- Sobel, Robert; J. Racino (1988). Biographical Directory of the Governors of the United States 1789-1978. Westport, CT: Greenwood Press. ISBN 0-930466-00-4.

== Images ==
- Hall of Governors Portrait Gallery Portrait courtesy of Historical and Cultural Affairs, Dover.

== Places with more information ==
- Delaware Historical Society; website; 505 North Market Street, Wilmington, Delaware 19801; (302) 655-7161
- University of Delaware; Library website; 181 South College Avenue, Newark, Delaware 19717; (302) 831-2965

Party political offices
Preceded by James R. Hoffecker	Republican nominee for Governor of Delaware; 1900	Succeeded by Joseph H. Chandler
Political offices
Preceded by Ebe W. Tunnell	Governor of Delaware; 1901–1905	Succeeded by Preston Lea
