= John M. Mendinhall =

American politician

John Marshall Mendinhall (September 30, 1861 – October 14, 1938) was an American politician who served as the third Lieutenant Governor of Delaware, from January 19, 1909, to January 21, 1913, under Governor Simeon S. Pennewill. He previously served as a state senator from 1905 to 1909.

On August 12, 1907 Mendinhall was elected president of Pusey & Jones Company, a major shipbuilder in Wilmington. He served in that role until 1904. He had a long relationship with Security Trust Company, eventually rising to become its president in 1934.

Political offices
Preceded by Isaac T. Parker	Lieutenant Governor of Delaware; 1909–1913	Succeeded by Colen Ferguson
