= Preston Lea =

American businessman and politician (1841–1916)

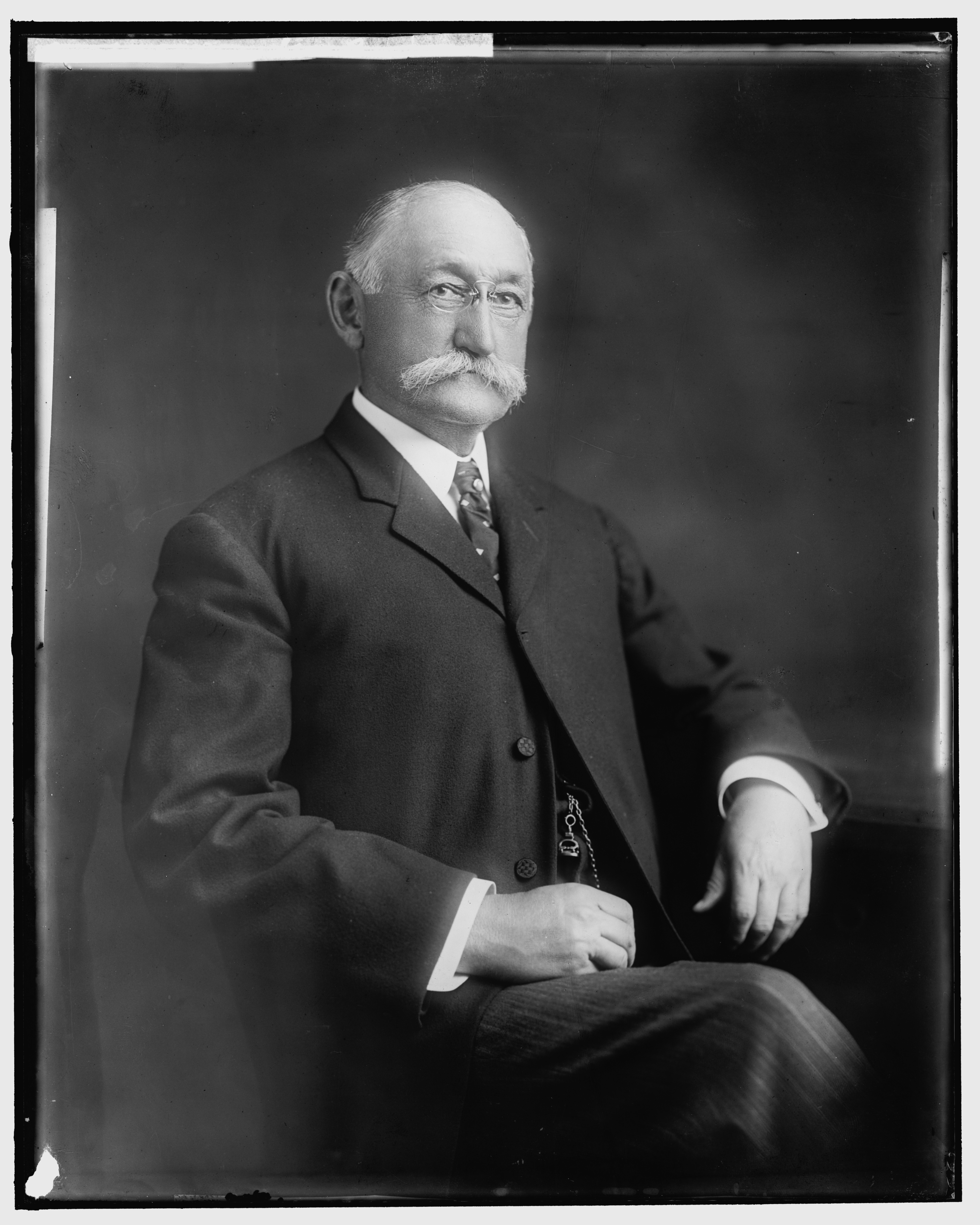

52nd Governor of Delaware
- In office January 17, 1905 – January 19, 1909
- Lieutenant: Isaac T. Parker
- Preceded by: John Hunn
- Succeeded by: Simeon S. Pennewill

Personal details
- Born: November 12, 1841 Wilmington, Delaware, U.S.
- Died: December 4, 1916 (aged 75) New Castle, Delaware, U.S.
- Party: Republican
- Spouse(s): Adelaide Moore; Eliza Naudain Corbit
- Occupation: Businessman

Preston Lea (November 12, 1841 – December 4, 1916) was an American businessman and politician from Wilmington, in New Castle County, Delaware. He was a member of the Republican Party who served as Governor of Delaware.

== Early life and family ==
Lea was born at Brandywine Village, now a part of Wilmington, Delaware, son of William and Jane Scott Lovett Lea. His ancestors came to Pennsylvania with William Penn. His grandfather, Thomas Lea, built a flour mill on the Brandywine Creek in 1811.

In 1870, he married Adelaide Moore; they had three children: Claudia Wright, Alice Moore, and Ethel Mildred. In 1897, he married again, to Eliza Naudain Corbit, with whom he had one child, Louise Corbit. Their home for many years was at 2315 17th Street in Wilmington. They were members of the Wilmington Friends Meeting of the Religious Society of Friends, or Quakers.

== Professional and political career ==
Wilmington, Delaware, is really a combination of two towns. Wilmington proper rises from the banks of the navigable Christina River and prospered as a convenient place to collect farm products from the interior of Delaware and central Pennsylvania. At its back, though, is a tributary of the Christina River, known as Brandywine Creek. Navigable for only a short distance, the creek quickly rises into the Piedmont and through a series of small falls, provides a dependable source of power for mills. Small boats, or shallops, sailed up to the base of these falls, unloaded their grain, and loaded back up with what became known as "Superfine" flour, some of the best flour produced in America. These mills were known as the Brandywine Mills and the town around them, Brandywine Village.

Lea's grandfather, Thomas Lea, built a flour mill in Brandywine Village on the Brandywine Creek in 1811. His father, William Lea, ran the mill until his death in 1873. After receiving an education at Lawrenceville, New Jersey, Preston Lea went to work for his father at the age of eighteen. When William Lea died, the firm was incorporated as William Lea & Sons. Preston Lea became its vice president and then its president in 1876.

In addition, he became president of the Wilmington Board of Trade in 1873 and in 1888 was elected president of the Union National Bank. Still holding these positions, he was also vice-president of Farmers Mutual Insurance Co., a director of Philadelphia, Baltimore & Washington Railroad, president of the Equitable Guarantee Bank, and president of the Wilmington City Railway Co.

During the 30 years following the Civil War the Republican Party was largely the party of New Castle County industrialists and the African-American population. Politically opposed by large majorities of the rural population of Kent and Sussex Counties, as well as much of the large Irish immigrant population in Wilmington, statewide they were a decided minority. Some years they didn't even field a ticket. However, as gas company millionaire and Philadelphia native J. Edward "Gas" Addicks poured campaign money into the Republican Party organization, young businessmen and politicians, tired of the long dominance of the Democrats, responded and joined up.

Another reason behind the success of the Addicks effort was the resentment many had for the established Republican leaders in New Castle County. Their control of the party seemed to others to be more important than beating Democrats and correcting widely acknowledged problems. The established party leaders could not abide the thought of supporting the "carpetbagger" Addicks, and rebuffed him and the newcomers he brought into the party with him. So, with a mostly progressive agenda, and styling themselves "Union Republicans," they frequently ran their own candidates and rapidly built a large following.

== Governor of Delaware ==
While Lea was certainly an old time Republican industrialist of New Castle County, he was different in that he saw the positive side of Addicks' efforts, formed close friendships with rising young politicians from lower Delaware such as John G. Townsend Jr., and was counted among the Union Republicans. In 1904 he was the Union Republican candidate for governor. Popular in New Castle County Republicans circles and benefiting from the well-funded Addicks machine elsewhere, Lea won nearly all the growing number of Republicans voters, easily defeating both Joseph Chandler, the regular Republican Party candidate and Caleb S. Pennewill, the Democratic Party candidate.

Within a year after the election, Addicks suffered major personal and business setbacks and completely withdrew from Delaware politics. With no further reason to disagree, the two Republican factions came together under the political leadership of T. Coleman du Pont. Thus formed the durable majority coalition of upstate industrialists and downstate small businessmen that governed Delaware for 60 years and is still the basis of the Republican Party.

Among its actions, the Delaware General Assembly finally outlawed the state pillory, although the whipping post remained. The long-disputed boundary with New Jersey in the Delaware River was also resolved and the now antiquated Chesapeake and Delaware Canal was sold to the Federal Government in order to provide for major improvement. Laws were also passed requiring at least three months of school attendance by children and local option legislation allowed Kent and Sussex counties to prohibit the sale of alcoholic beverages. T. Coleman du Pont announced his plans for a new highway, to be built the length of Delaware, in 1908.

Delaware General Assembly (sessions while Governor)
Year	Assembly	Senate Majority	President pro tempore	House Majority	Speaker
1905-1906	93rd	Republican	Alvin B. Conner	Republican	William D. Denney
1907-1908	94th	Republican	George W. Sparks	Republican	Richard Hodgsdon

== Death and legacy ==
In his later years Lea spent much of his time at his summer home "the Orchards," thought to be in the area of the refinery near Delaware City. He died at New Castle and is buried in the Wilmington and Brandywine Cemetery at Wilmington.

== Almanac ==
Elections are held the first Tuesday after November 1. The governor takes office the third Tuesday of January, and has a four-year term.

Public Offices
Office	Type	Location	Began office	Ended office	notes
Governor	Executive	Dover	January 17, 1905	January 19, 1909	

Election results
Year	Office	Subject	Party	Votes	%	Opponent	Party	Votes	%
1904	Governor	Preston Lea	Republican	22,532	46%	Caleb S. Pennewill; Joseph H. Chandler	Democratic; Republican	19,780; 802	41% 2%

== Images ==
- Family Photo Album

== Places with more information ==
- Delaware Historical Society; website; 505 North Market Street, Wilmington, Delaware 19801; (302) 655-7161
- University of Delaware; Library website; 181 South College Avenue, Newark, Delaware 19717; (302) 831-2965

Political offices
Preceded by John Hunn	Governor of Delaware; 1905–1909	Succeeded by Simeon S. Pennewill
