= North Milford Historic District =

Historic district in Delaware, United States

- U.S. National Register of Historic Places
- U.S. Historic district
- Location within Delaware Location within the United States
- Location: Roughly bounded by Mispillion River, Silver Lake, N. Walnut and NW 3rd Sts., Milford, Delaware
- Coordinates: 38°54′53″N 75°25′52″W
- Area: 21.5 acres (8.7 ha)
- Architectural style: Greek Revival, Mixed (more Than 2 Styles From Different Periods), Federal
- MPS: Milford MRA
- NRHP reference No.: 83001357
- Added to NRHP: January 7, 1983

North Milford Historic District is a national historic district located in Milford, Kent County, Delaware, United States. It encompasses 98 contributing buildings, 2 contributing sites, and 1 contributing structure in the original town as laid out in 1787. It mainly consists of residential and commercial buildings, the majority of which were built before 1860. They include examples of the Greek Revival and Federal styles. Notable buildings include the "Billy Welch House," Welch/Hart House, "Sudler Apartments" (1793), James Hall House (c. 1880), and the "Towers" (c. 1783), home of Governor William Burton (1859-1863). The Christ Church, James McColley House, Mill House, and Parson Thorne Mansion are located in the district and listed separately.

It was listed on the National Register of Historic Places in 1983.
