= Lofland =

Lofland is a surname of Norwegian origin. Notable people with the surname include:

- Dana Lofland (born 1967), American professional golfer
- Jacob Lofland (born 1996), American actor
- James R. Lofland (1823–1894), American lawyer and politician
- John Lofland (disambiguation):
  - John Lofland (poet) (1798–1849), American poet and writer, known as the Milford Bard
  - John Lofland (sociologist) (1936–2026), American sociologist, professor, and author
