= 1858 Delaware gubernatorial election =

- November 2, 1858
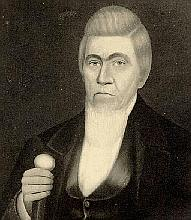

| Nominee | William Burton | James S. Buckmaster |
| Party | Democratic | People's |
| Popular vote | 6,941 | 6,244 |
| Percentage | 52.64% | 47.36% |
- County results Burton: 50–60% Buckmaster: 50–60%
Governor before election
Peter F. Causey
Know Nothing
Elected Governor
William Burton
Democratic

The 1858 Delaware gubernatorial election was held on November 2, 1858. The Know Nothing incumbent governor of Delaware Peter F. Causey was ineligible to seek re-election. The Delaware Democratic Party nominated William Burton, the party's nominee in the 1854 election. The People's Party, formed from a coalition of the Know Nothings with the nascent Delaware Republican Party, nominated the former state treasurer James S. Buckmaster. Burton defeated Buckmaster in the general election by a narrow margin of 204 votes.

== General election ==
=== Results ===
1858 Delaware gubernatorial election
| Party | Candidate | Votes | % | ±% |
|---|---|---|---|---|
| Democratic | William Burton | 7,758 | 50.67 | ▲3.31 |
| People's | James S. Buckmaster | 7,554 | 49.33 | New |
| Majority | | 204 | 1.33 | N/A |
| Total votes | | 15,312 | 100.00 | |
| Democratic gain from Know Nothing | | | | |

== Bibliography ==
- Conrad, Henry C. (1908). History of the State of Delaware: From the Earliest Settlements to the Year 1907. Vol. 1. Lancaster, PA.
- Dubin, Michael J. (2003). United States Gubernatorial Elections, 1776-1860: The Official Results by State and County. Jefferson, NC: McFarland and Company. ISBN 978-0-7864-1439-0.
- Munroe, John A. (2006). History of Delaware (5th ed.). Newark: University of Delaware Press.
