= 1854 Delaware gubernatorial election =

- November 7, 1854

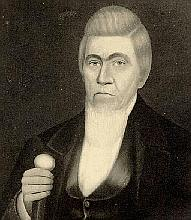
Nominee	Peter F. Causey	William Burton
Party	Know Nothing	Democratic
Popular vote	6,941	6,244
Percentage	52.64%	47.36%
- County results Causey: 50–60%
Governor before election
William H. H. Ross
Democratic
Elected Governor
Peter F. Causey
Know Nothing

The 1854 Delaware gubernatorial election was held on November 7, 1854. Incumbent Democratic Governor William H. H. Ross was unable to seek re-election. His 1850 opponent, former State Representative Peter F. Causey, ran as the American Party candidate, and faced former Kent County Sheriff William Burton, the Democratic nominee. Causey ultimately defeated Burton by a slim, but decisive, margin.

== General election ==
=== Results ===
1854 Delaware gubernatorial election
Party	Candidate	Votes	%	±%
Know Nothing	Peter F. Causey	6,941	52.64%	—
Democratic	William Burton	6,244	47.36%	−0.72%
Majority		697	5.29%	+5.10%
Turnout		13,185	100.00%	
Know Nothing gain from Democratic				

== Bibliography ==
- Gubernatorial Elections, 1787-1997. Washington, D.C.: Congressional Quarterly Inc. 1998. ISBN 1-56802-396-0.
- Glashan, Roy R. (1979). American Governors and Gubernatorial Elections, 1775-1978. Meckler Books. ISBN 0-930466-17-9.
- Dubin, Michael J. (2003). United States Gubernatorial Elections, 1776-1860: The Official Results by State and County. Jefferson, North Carolina: McFarland. ISBN 978-0-7864-1439-0.
- Delaware House Journal, 65th General Assembly, 1st Reg. Sess. (1855).
