= William Burton (American politician) =

American politician (1789–1866)

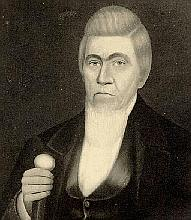

39th Governor of Delaware
- In office January 18, 1859 – January 20, 1863
- Preceded by: Peter F. Causey
- Succeeded by: William Cannon

Personal details
- Born: October 16, 1789 Kent County, Delaware
- Died: August 5, 1866 (aged 76) Milford, Delaware
- Party: Democratic
- Spouse(s): Eliza Sorden; Ann C. Hill
- Education: University of Pennsylvania
- Profession: Physician

William Burton (October 16, 1789 – August 5, 1866) was an American medical doctor and politician from Milford, in Kent County, Delaware. He was a member of the Democratic Party, who served as Governor of Delaware during the first two years of the American Civil War.

== Early life and family ==
Burton was born near Milford, Kent County, Delaware, the son of John Burton and Mary Vaughan. After his first wife Eliza Sorden's death in 1829, he married Ann C. Hill and had one child, Rhoda. The family lived in the Parson Thorne Mansion at 501 NW Front Street in Milford, and were members of Christ Episcopal Church. He also lived at the "Towers," now a contributing property in the North Milford Historic District.

== Professional and political career ==
After receiving his medical degree from the University of Pennsylvania's Medical School, Burton had a practice in Lewes, Delaware for a time, and then relocated to Milford. He was first elected as the Sheriff of Kent County, and was initially a Whig before moving to the more "states rights" Democratic Party in 1848. He was his party's candidate in the 1854 Delaware gubernatorial election, but lost to Peter F. Causey, a former Democrat who had joined the anti-immigration Know-Nothing Party. Burton was successful in the subsequent 1858 election, and became governor of Delaware on January 18, 1859.

== Governor of Delaware ==
Delaware was a slave state, but slavery in Delaware had long been in decline by the 1860s. Influenced by Quaker Pennsylvania, many Delaware slaveowners freed their slaves, and by 1860 90% of Delaware's Black population were free people of color rather than enslaved. However, Delaware's state government was controlled by pro-slavery Democrats such as Burton who opposed abolition.

During the political crisis that followed the 1860 United States presidential election, some Delaware politicians such as US Senator James A. Bayard Jr. encouraged Governor Burton to call a secession convention as the southern states had done. Governor Burton addressed the state legislature on January 2, 1861, defending the continuation of slavery and blaming "fanatical" Northern abolitionists for the crisis, and although he closed by saying "the preservation of the Union is my most earnest prayer," Burton recommended they vote to hold a secession convention. However, the Delaware General Assembly opposed leaving the Union due to Delaware's geographic vulnerability and economic ties to the North, and on January 3 they passed a resolution condemning secession.

Following the Battle of Fort Sumter and the outbreak of the American Civil War in April 1861, Burton took a decidedly pro-Union stance. He called on the people of Delaware to "sustain the laws of the Government under which we live," took action to secure the state's crucial DuPont gunpowder mills, and encouraged volunteers to enlist in the Federal army. Some Delawareans sympathized with the Southern Confederacy, and rival volunteer pro-Union and pro-Southern militia companies began forming throughout the state. To maintain order and keep Delaware on the side of the Union, Governor Burton appointed Henry du Pont, the head of the DuPont company and a committed Unionist, as Major General of the state militia forces. Du Pont was able to disarm the pro-Southern organizations and prevent the outbreak of any clashes between rival factions.

During the course of the war, the Federal government called on Delaware to supply troops for the Union army, but unlike many other states Delaware did not have an official state militia the Governor could enlist for military service. Burton was initially uncertain if he had the authority under state law to enlist troops, and he had to balance the concerns of pro-peace Democrats in the General Assembly who disapproved of most of the Federal government's war measures. However, due to the groundswell of public support for the Union, Burton accepted the enlistment of volunteers into the Union army, and eventually Delaware would supply more than 12,000 men for the nation's armed forces.

Burton's term of office expired on January 20, 1863, and he was succeeded by Republican William Cannon. The 1862 Delaware gubernatorial election was marred by high tensions between pro-Southern and pro-Union factions, and the state's Republican party requested the presence of federal soldiers to guard Delaware's polling places, which caused outrage from Democrats. In his final message to the state legislature in January 1863, Burton condemned the presence of troops during the election, and criticized President Lincoln's Emancipation Proclamation, which Burton said left him "without a glimmering hope for the restoration of the Union."

== General Assembly sessions ==
Delaware General Assembly (sessions while Governor)
Year	Assembly	Senate Majority	Speaker	House Majority	Speaker
1859–1860	70th	Democratic	Manlove Carlisle	Democratic	John W. F. Jackson
1861–1862	71st	Democratic	John Green	People's	John F. Williamson

== Death ==
Burton died in Milford on August 5, 1866 and is buried there at the Christ Episcopal Churchyard.

Party political offices
Preceded by William H. H. Ross	Democratic nominee for Governor of Delaware; 1854, 1858	Succeeded by Samuel Jefferson
Political offices
Preceded by Peter F. Causey	Governor of Delaware; 1859–1863	Succeeded by William Cannon
