= Peter F. Causey =

American politician (1801–1871)

38th Governor of Delaware
- In office January 16, 1855 – January 18, 1859
- Preceded by: William H. H. Ross
- Succeeded by: William Burton

Member of the Delaware House of Representatives
- In office January 6, 1832 - January 6, 1835

Personal details
- Born: January 11, 1801 Bridgeville, Delaware
- Died: February 15, 1871 (aged 70) Milford, Delaware
- Party: Democratic; American
- Spouse: Maria Williams
- Occupation: merchant

Peter Foster Causey (January 11, 1801 – February 15, 1871) was an American merchant and politician from Milford, in Kent County, Delaware. He was a member of the American Party, who served in the Delaware General Assembly and as Governor of Delaware.

== Early life and family ==
Causey was born in Bridgeville, Delaware, son of Peter T. and Tamzey Causey. His family lived in Easton, Maryland for a time, but returned to Delaware in 1815, settling on North Walnut Street in Milford. He married Maria Williams and they had six children, William F., Maria E., Sally Maria, Peter Foster, Jr., John W., and Robert H. In 1850 they bought the old Levin Crapper mansion, former home of Governor Daniel Rogers. It was subsequently known as the Causey Mansion. The Causey family owned a large flour mill and were successful merchants, taking advantage of the many business opportunities in Milford at the time. They were members of the First Methodist Church in Milford.

== Professional and political career ==
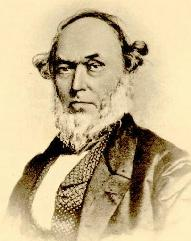
Peter F. Causey

In the shifting political combinations of the time, Causey began his career as a progressive Jacksonian Democrat, and was elected to the state house in the 1831 session and the 1832/33 session. As the Democrats lost their progressive agenda, and with the collapse of the Whig Party, most of the energy in opposition to the increasingly conservative Democrats came from the Temperance movement. In 1850 a Temperance candidate was almost elected, and in 1854 Causey signed on as their candidate under the aegis of the American Party. This was an unusual combination of various causes that in Delaware was headed by prohibition. He was elected Governor of Delaware in 1854, defeating William Burton, the Democratic candidate and served from January 16, 1855 until January 18, 1859.

Along with Causey several "Know-Nothings", as they were known, were elected to the General Assembly. Proceeding with their Prohibition agenda, they passed legislation that went fully into effect by December 1855. By Election Day 1856, the effects of this legislation were detested enough by the voters that they replaced nearly all the "Know-Nothings" with Democrats, and leaving Causey two years to govern with a strong Democratic opposition in the General Assembly. Needless to say, the repeal of the prohibition laws was foremost on their agenda.

Other than the prohibition matter the most important issue in Delaware at the time was the completion of the Delaware Railroad. By September 1855 it was complete to Middletown, and by January 1857 all the way to Delmar. On the other side of the ledger, by 1861 Delaware College was forced to close due to a lack of funds, aggravated by a brutal unsolved murder on the campus.

A true reformer, Causey hammered the General Assembly on all the same issues his predecessors had been speaking about for years.

The existing public schools, he said, were dilapidated and the teachers untrained. Public education has been the theme of much debate in our legislative halls for years, he remarked, and yet each succeeding session has ended in little or no alteration for the better. The tiny school districts run by committees elected by the residents most hostile to taxation simply were not working. Furthermore, the insane, more than any other portion of our community, were dependent upon our care and protection.

Delaware General Assembly (sessions while Governor)
Year	Assembly	Senate Majority	Speaker	House Majority	Speaker
1855–1856	68th	American	Daniel Curry	American	Samuel Biddle
1857–1858	69th	Democratic	Abraham Boyce	Democratic	George W. Cummins

== Death and legacy ==
Causey died on February 15, 1871, aged 70, in Milford, and was buried there at the Christ Episcopal Churchyard. One of the properties he owned at Milford, the Mill House, was listed on the National Register of Historic Places in 1983.

== Almanac ==
Elections were held the first Tuesday in October until 1831, and since they have been held on the first Tuesday after November 1. Members of the Delaware General Assembly took office in the first Tuesday of January. State representatives have a term of two years. The governor takes office the third Tuesday in January, and has a four-year term.

Public Offices
Office	Type	Location	Began office	Ended office	notes
State Representative	Legislature	Dover	January 6, 1832	January 6, 1833	
State Representative	Legislature	Dover	January 6, 1833	January 6, 1835	
Governor	Executive	Dover	January 16, 1855	January 18, 1859	

Delaware General Assembly service
Dates	Assembly	Chamber	Majority	Governor	Committees	District
1832	56th	State House	National Republican	David Hazzard		Kent at-large
1833–1834	57th	State House	Whig	Caleb Bennett		Kent at-large

Election results
Year	Office	Subject	Party	Votes	%	Opponent	Party	Votes	%
1846	Governor	Peter F. Causey	Whig	6,012	49%	William Tharp	Democratic	6,148	51%
1850	Governor	Peter F. Causey	Independent	5,978	48%	William H. H. Ross	Democratic	6,001	48%
1854	Governor	Peter F. Causey	American	6,941	53%	William Burton	Democratic	6,244	47%

== Bibliography ==
- Conrad, Henry C. (1908). History of the State of Delaware. Lancaster, Pennsylvania: Wickersham Company.
- Hoffecker, Carol E. (2004). Democracy in Delaware. Wilmington, Delaware: Cedar Tree Books. ISBN 1-892142-23-6.
- Martin, Roger A. (1984). History of Delaware Through its Governors. Wilmington, Delaware: McClafferty Press.
- Martin, Roger A. (1995). Memoirs of the Senate. Newark, DE: Roger A. Martin.
- Scharf, John Thomas (1888). History of Delaware 1609-1888. 2 vols. Philadelphia: L. J. Richards & Co.

Party political offices
Preceded by Thomas Stockton	Whig nominee for Governor of Delaware; 1846, 1850	Succeeded by None
First	Know Nothing nominee for Governor of Delaware; 1854	Succeeded by None
Political offices
Preceded by William H. H. Ross	Governor of Delaware; 1855–1859	Succeeded by William Burton
