= Dr. Dawson House =

Historic house in Delaware, United States

- U.S. National Register of Historic Places
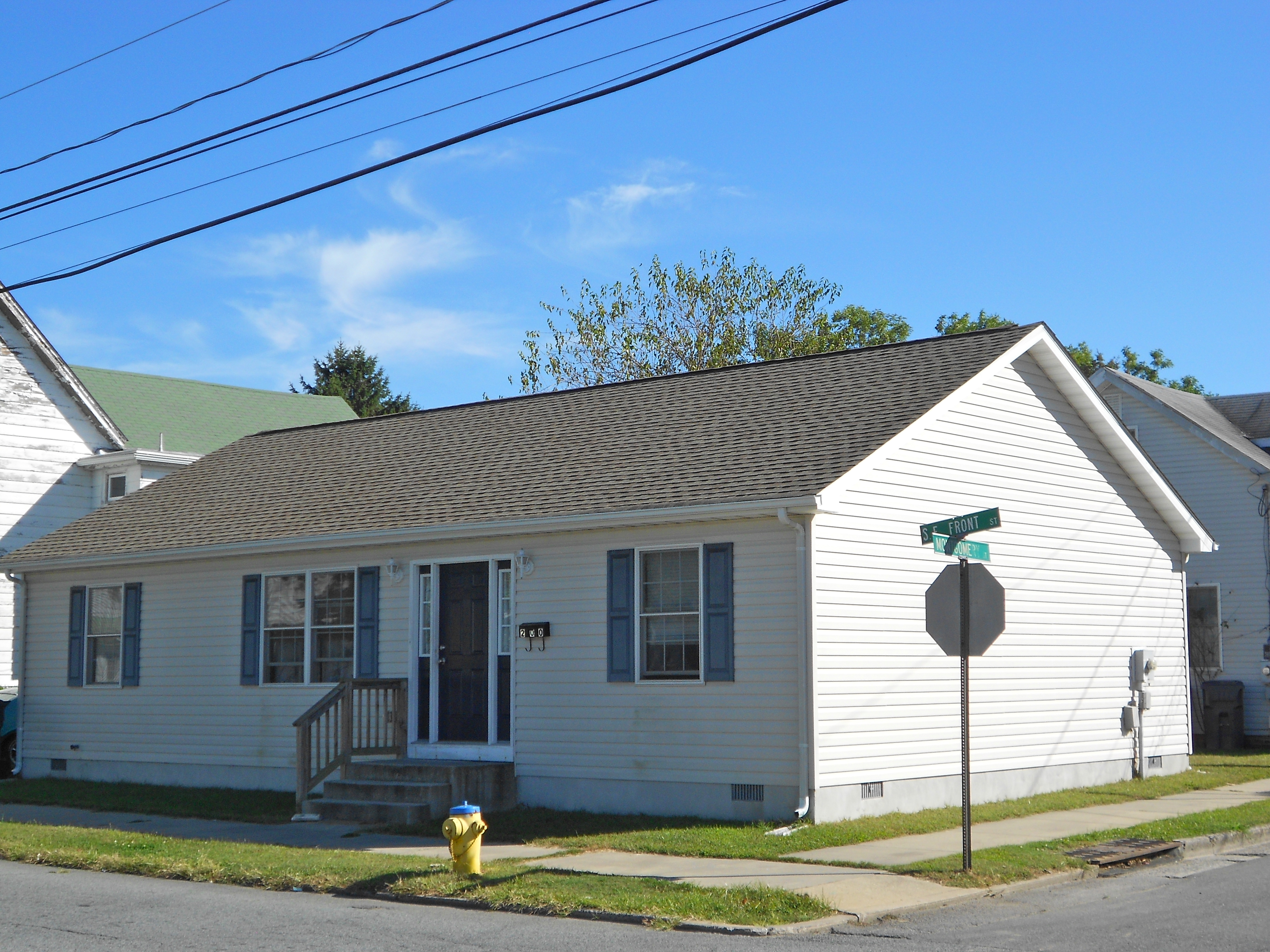
- The modern house that replaced the original building

- Location within Delaware Location within the United States
- Location: 200 SE Front St., Milford, Delaware
- Coordinates: 38°54′43″N 75°25′34″W
- Area: 0.1 acres (0.040 ha)
- Architectural style: Gothic Revival
- MPS: Milford MRA
- NRHP reference No.: 83001355
- Added to NRHP: January 7, 1983

Dr. Dawson House was a historic home located at Milford, Sussex County, Delaware. It was built in the mid-19th century, and is a two-story, five-bay, frame building with a steep gable roof with cross gable and lancet windows in the Gothic Revival style. It has a one-story side wing and two-story rear wing. A porch covers the middle three bays on the main house. It was originally built as two separate, but neighboring, structures that were joined at an unknown date. Dr. Dawson used part of the house as an office.

It was added to the National Register of Historic Places in 1983. It was subsequently demolished and replaced with a single-story home in 2006.
