= Bank House (Milford, Delaware) =

Historic house in Delaware, United States

- U.S. National Register of Historic Places
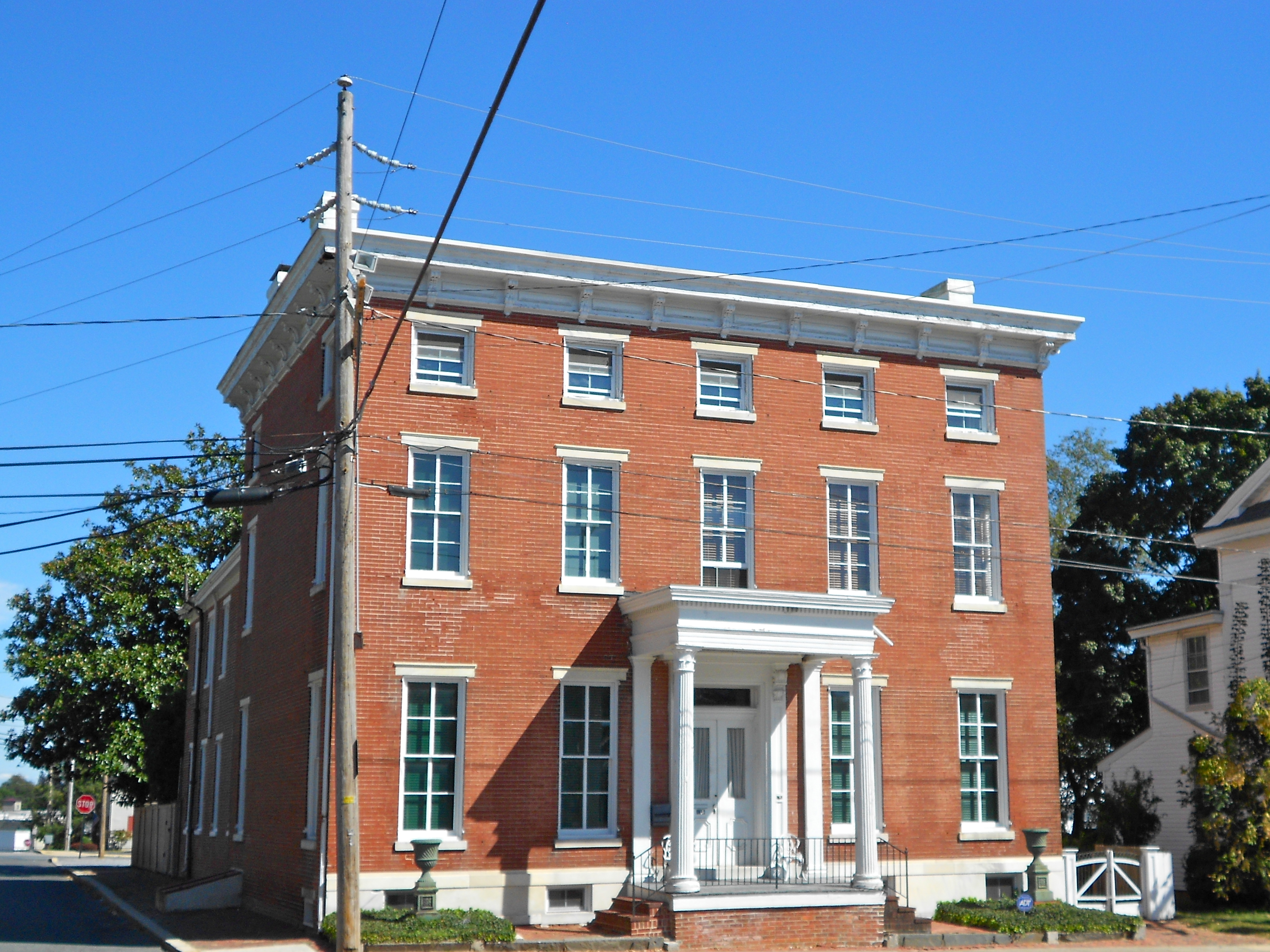

- Location within Delaware Location within the United States
- Location: 119 N. Walnut St., Milford, Delaware
- Coordinates: 38°54′55″N 75°25′43″W
- Area: 0.2 acres (0.081 ha)
- Built: 1854
- Architect: Reynolds, Alonzo
- Architectural style: Greek Revival, Italianate
- NRHP reference No.: 78000890
- Added to NRHP: July 31, 1978

Bank House is a historic home located at Milford, Kent County, Delaware, United States. It was built between 1854 and 1857, and is a three-story, five-bay, brick Greek Revival-style dwelling. It measures 42 feet by 34 feet and has a two-story, L-shaped wing measuring 40 feet by 18 feet. It has a flat roof and features an entrance portico supported by classic Corinthian order fluted columns. It was designed to be the banking house for the Bank of Milford, and included bank operations and housing for the cashier of the bank and his family. The bank failed before the building was complete, then completed by a physician who completed it as his residence and medical office.

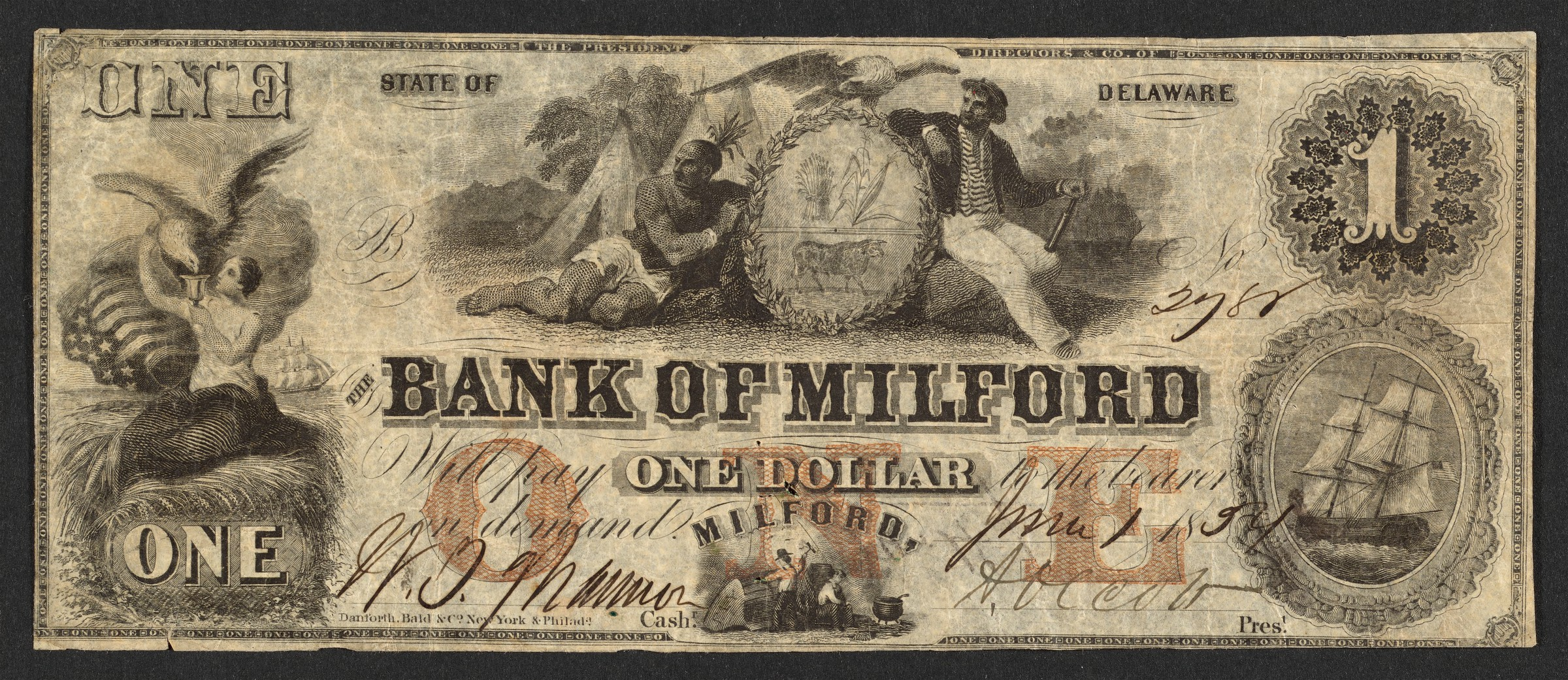
Bank of Milford 1 dollar banknote from 1854

It was listed on the National Register of Historic Places in 1978.
