= Walnut Farm =

Historic house and farm in Delaware, US

- U.S. National Register of Historic Places
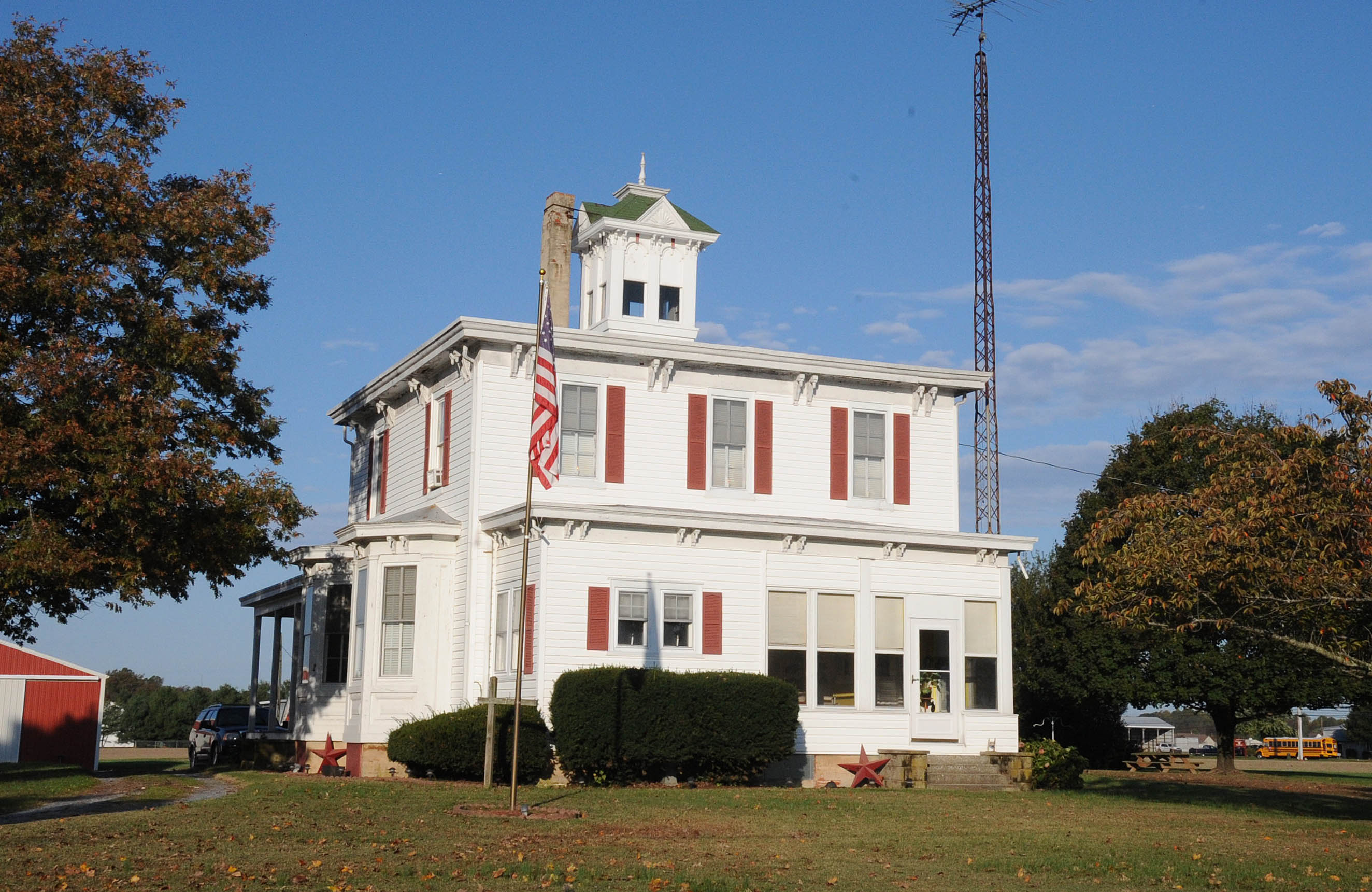

- Location within Delaware Location within the United States
- Location: Roosa Rd., Milford, Delaware
- Coordinates: 38°55′39″N 75°26′9″W
- Area: 23 acres (9.3 ha)
- Built: 1867
- Architectural style: Italianate
- NRHP reference No.: 82001025
- Added to NRHP: November 10, 1982

Walnut Farm, also known as the Walnut Hill Farm and The Roosa Farm, is a historic home and farm located at Milford, Kent County, Delaware. The house was built about 1867, and is a two-story, three bay "T"-planned frame dwelling in the Italianate style. The main block has a hipped roof topped by a distinctive cupola. Also on the property are a contributing frame barn, stock-pound and hog house, a shop, and corn crib.

It was listed on the National Register of Historic Places in 1982.
