= William Cannon =

American politician (1809–1865)

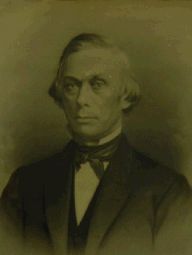

40th Governor of Delaware
- In office January 20, 1863 – March 1, 1865
- Preceded by: William Burton
- Succeeded by: Gove Saulsbury

Member of the Delaware House of Representatives
- In office January 6, 1845 – January 6, 1849

Personal details
- Born: March 15, 1809 Bridgeville, Delaware, U.S.
- Died: March 1, 1865 (aged 55) Bridgeville, Delaware, U.S.
- Party: Democratic; Republican
- Spouse: Margaret Ann Barker
- Children: Philip L. Cannon
- Occupation: Merchant

William Cannon (March 15, 1809 – March 1, 1865) was an American merchant and politician from Bridgeville, in Sussex County, Delaware. He was a member of the Democratic Party and later the Republican Party, who served in the Delaware General Assembly and as Governor of Delaware during much of the Civil War.

== Early life and family ==
Cannon was born at Bridgeville, in Sussex County, Delaware, the son of Josiah and Nancy Bowlin Cannon. He married Margaret Ann Barker and had six children. He began working in his father's merchandising business in Bridgeville, and gradually expanded it to include lumber, grain, grist and saw mills, and a brick yard. His business interests included peaches, banking, and newspaper publishing, and he was a director of the Delaware Railroad.

Cannon's eldest son, William Laws Cannon (1839–1863), served in the Union Army during the Civil War. He was the captain of Company E of the First Delaware Cavalry. The younger William contracted typhoid fever and died on August 18, 1863 during the Gettysburg campaign.

== Governor of Delaware ==
Cannon was elected as a Democrat to the state house for the 1845–46 session and the 1847–48 session. From 1849 until 1851 he was state treasurer. Although he had been a leader in the Democratic Party prior to the 1862 elections, at that time he switched parties and became a Republican. Delaware's political establishment was dominated by Democrats, but Cannon was staunchly in favor of the Union from the outset of the secession crisis.

Fearing an outbreak of violence as tensions were running high during the 1862 Delaware gubernatorial election, Delaware Republicans requested federal troops to protect the state's polling places. The troops came, supervised the election, and Cannon was elected, defeating Democrat Samuel Jefferson from New Castle County. However, Cannon faced a General Assembly with a Democratic majority in both houses.

Democrats in the state legislature were furiously opposed to the new Governor, and condemned "both the actions of the Federal Administration and those among our own citizens, who for partisan purposes alone sought to defeat the fair expression of the popular will at the polls by the potent influence of Federal bayonets." The State House refused to allow Cannon the use of its facilities for his inauguration, but he was defiant in the face of pro-slavery Delaware Democrats who had been outraged by President Lincoln's Emancipation Proclamation which came into effect on January 1, 1863. Cannon stated in his inaugural address that "slavery in this state is doomed. The period may be longer or shorter, but the result is inevitable."

In 1863, federal troops were once again called to supervise a special election to fill the seat of deceased U.S. Representative William Temple. The army required voters to swear a loyalty oath, and as a result Democrats boycotted the election, with only 15 votes cast in the state for the Democratic candidate.

Democrats took part in the 1864 elections, winning the state's sole US House seat and maintaining control of the legislature. The General Assembly rejected Cannon's request to approve the Thirteenth Amendment prohibiting slavery. This act had been approved by neighboring border state Maryland, but Delaware's Democrats would refuse to pass this measure until 1901.

Cannon served as Governor of Delaware from January 20, 1863, until his death while in office on March 1, 1865. He had become ill, some said, after helping to extinguish a fire. He was almost 56 years old and the eighth governor to die in office.

Delaware General Assembly (sessions while Governor)
Year	Assembly	Senate majority	Speaker	House majority	Speaker
1863–1864	72nd	Democratic	John R. Tatum	Democratic	John Sorden
1865–1866	73rd	Democratic	Gove Saulsbury	Democratic	Shephard P. Houston

== Death and legacy ==
Cannon died at Bridgeville, Delaware, and was buried there in the Bridgeville Methodist Cemetery. His son Philip L. Cannon became the first Lieutenant Governor of Delaware in 1901.

== Electoral history ==
Elections are held on the first Tuesday after November 1. Members of the Delaware General Assembly took office in the first Tuesday of January. State representatives have a term of two years. The governor takes office the third Tuesday in January, and has a four-year term.

Public offices
Office	Type	Location	Began office	Ended office	Notes
State Representative	Legislature	Dover	January 6, 1845	January 6, 1847	
State Representative	Legislature	Dover	January 6, 1847	January 6, 1849	
State Treasurer	Executive	Dover	January 6, 1849	January 6, 1851	
Governor	Executive	Dover	January 20, 1863	March 1, 1865	died in office

Delaware General Assembly service
Dates	Assembly	Chamber	Majority	Governor	Committees	District
1845–1846	63rd	State House	Whig	Thomas Stockton		Sussex at-large
1847–1848	64th	State House	Whig	William Tharp		Sussex at-large

Election results
Year	Office	Subject	Party	Votes	%	Opponent	Party	Votes	%
1862	Governor	William Cannon	Republican	8,155	50%	Samuel Jefferson	Democratic	8,044	50%

== Images ==
- Hall of Governors Portrait Gallery; Portrait courtesy of Historical and Cultural Affairs, Dover

== Places with more information ==
- Delaware Historical Society; website; 505 North Market Street, Wilmington, Delaware 19801; (302) 655-7161
- University of Delaware; Library website; 181 South College Avenue, Newark, Delaware 19717; (302) 831-2965

Party political offices
Preceded by James S. Buckmaster	Republican nominee for Governor of Delaware; 1862	Succeeded by James Riddle
Political offices
Preceded by William Burton	Governor of Delaware; 1863–1865	Succeeded by Gove Saulsbury
