= J. H. Wilkerson & Son Brickworks =

Former historic building in Delaware, US

- U.S. National Register of Historic Places
- U.S. Historic district
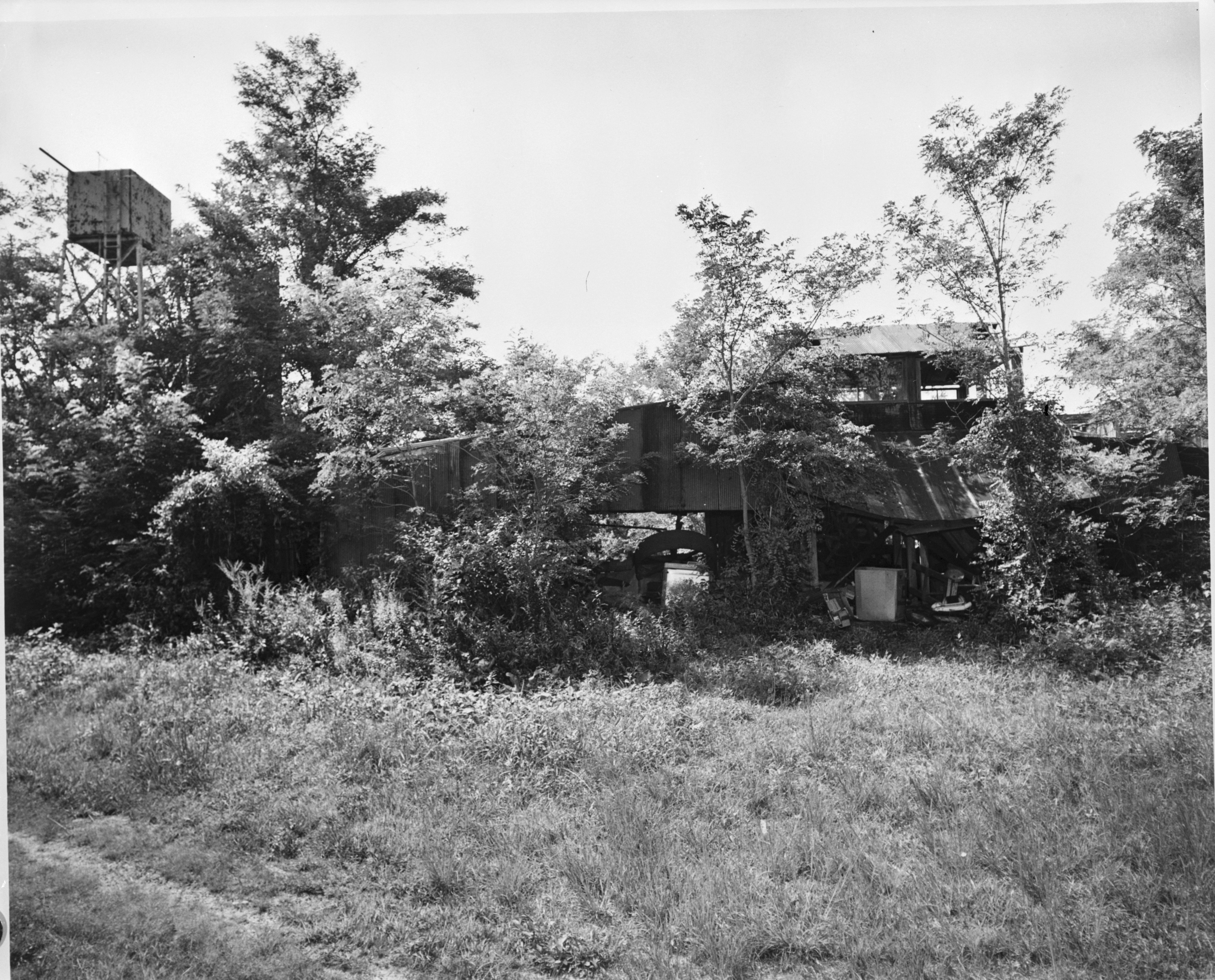
- J. H. Wilkerson & Sons Brick Works, HAER Photo, 1975

- Location within Delaware Location within the United States
- Location: Off SR 409, Milford, Delaware
- Coordinates: 38°55′08″N 75°24′50″W
- Area: 1.5 acres (0.61 ha)
- Built: 1912
- NRHP reference No.: 78000892
- Added to NRHP: July 12, 1978

J. H. Wilkerson & Son Brickworks was a historic abandoned brickworks and national historic district located at Milford, Delaware, United States. The district includes the sites of three contributing buildings and one contributing site at the brickworks that operated from 1912 to 1957. The sheds, machinery, kiln, and other structures which housed the machinery remain standing, others have deteriorated or collapsed. Last standing were the storage shed, the shed over the brick-making machine, and one of the drying sheds. All of the machinery was in place as were other pieces of equipment used in the brick-making process. The walls of the kiln remain standing, just as they would have been left after the fired bricks are removed.

It was listed on the National Register of Historic Places in 1978. It is listed on the Delaware Cultural and Historic Resources GIS system as destroyed or demolished.
