= Egglinton Hall =

Historic house in Delaware, United States

- U.S. National Register of Historic Places
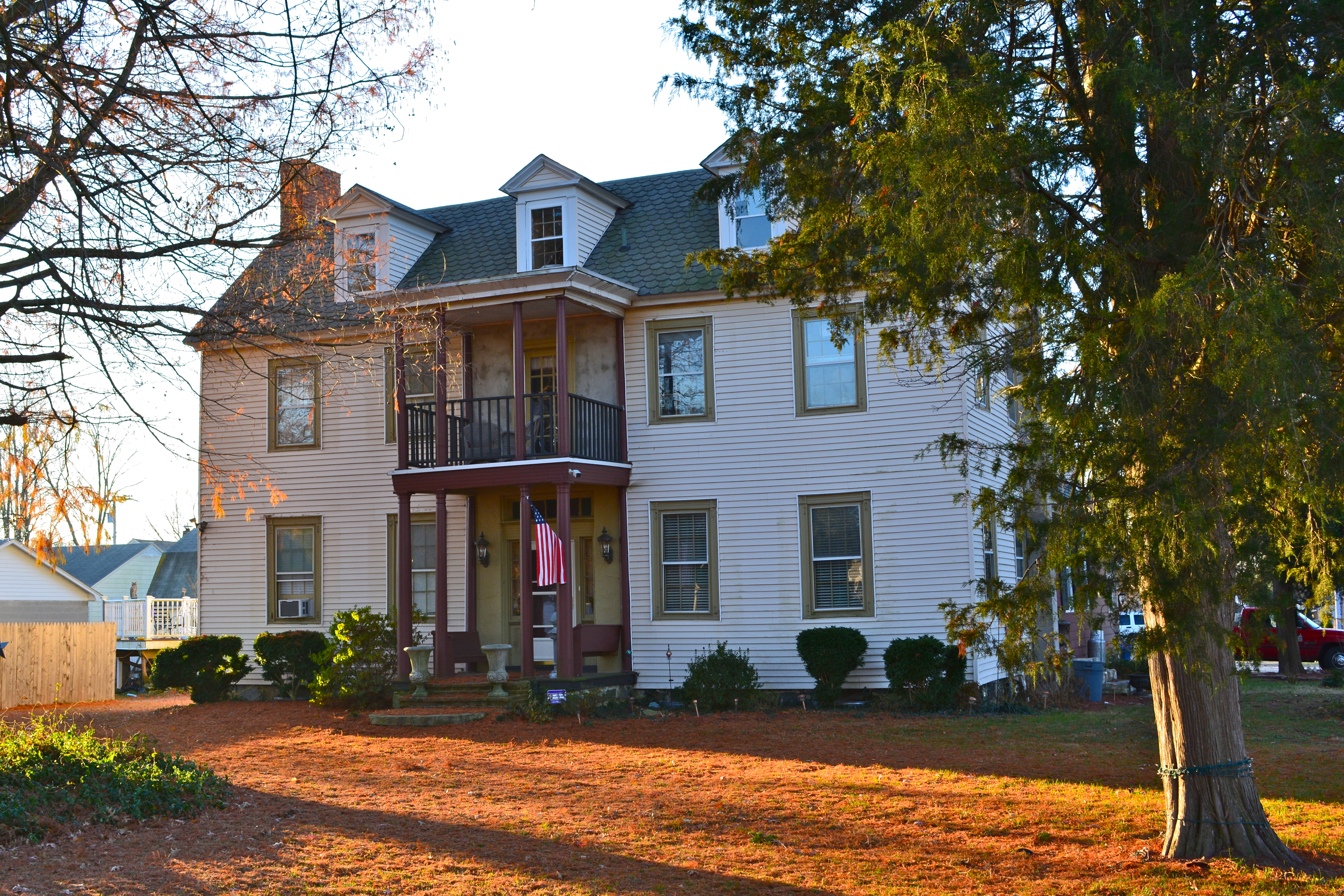

- Location within Delaware Location within the United States
- Location: 700 SE 2nd St., Milford, Delaware
- Coordinates: 38°54′34″N 75°25′15″W
- Area: 1 acre (0.40 ha)
- Built: 1790
- Architectural style: Greek Revival, Other, Chesapeake Bay Vernacular
- MPS: Milford MRA
- NRHP reference No.: 83001359
- Added to NRHP: January 7, 1983

Egglinton Hall is a historic home located in Milford, Sussex County, Delaware. The house was constructed by Henry Egglinton circa 1790 and is noted for its Greek Revival features, particularly the two-story porch added in 1828. Reverend Truston P. McColley, a significant figure in Sussex County history, lived in the house from 1828 until 1874. McColley preached and led Methodist churches around Milford; he was also a successful businessman who helped start the peach industry in southern Delaware and organized a railroad in Milford. In addition, McColley served as president of the 1852 Delaware Constitutional Convention.

Egglinton Hall was added to the National Register of Historic Places on January 7, 1983.
