= Golden Mine =

Historic house in Delaware, United States

- U.S. National Register of Historic Places
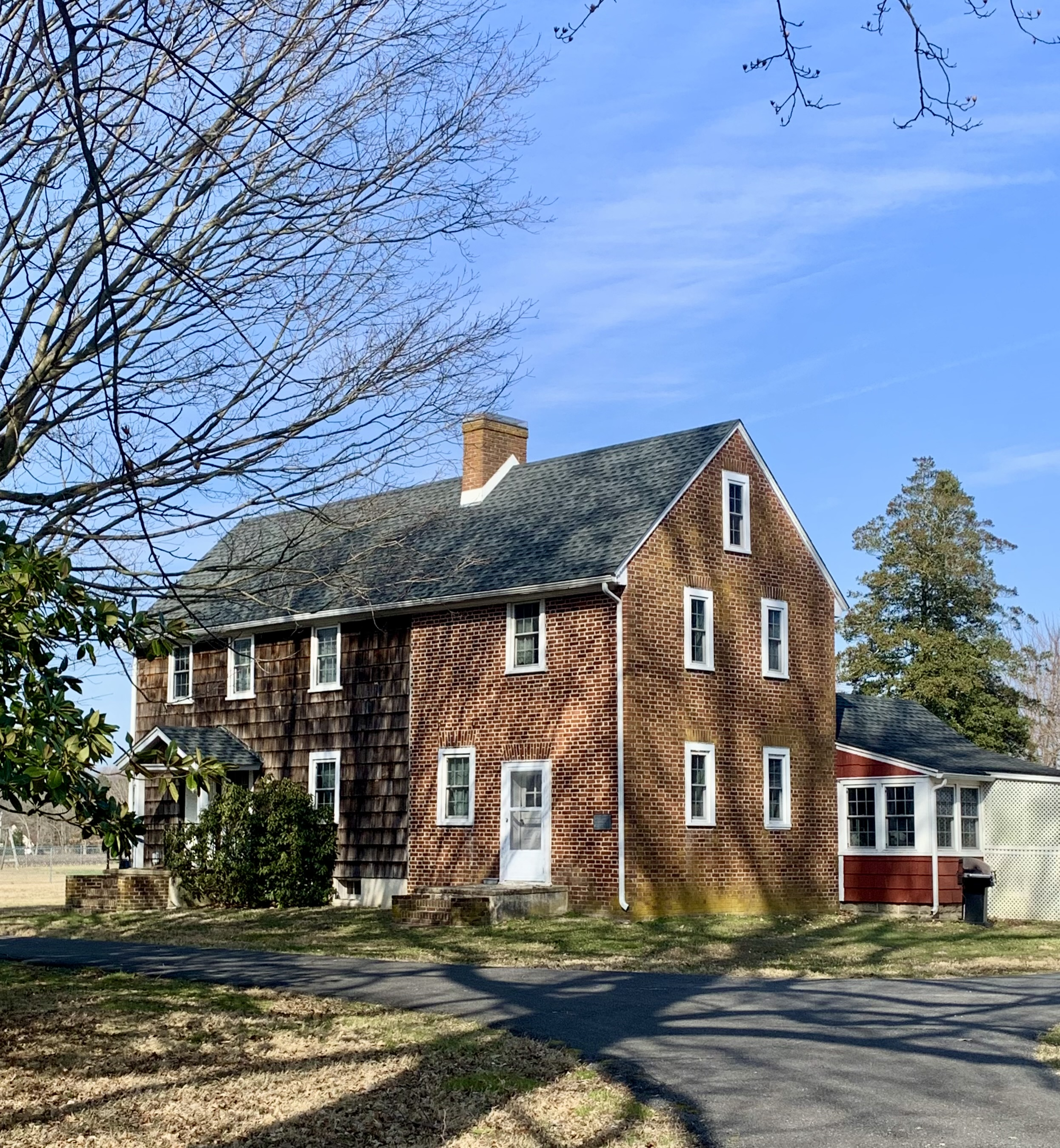
- Golden Mine in 2022

- Location within Delaware Location within the United States
- Location: Roosa Rd., Milford, Delaware
- Coordinates: 38°54′19″N 75°29′8″W
- Area: less than one acre
- Built: c. 1763
- NRHP reference No.: 78000891
- Added to NRHP: August 24, 1978

Golden Mine is a historic home located at Milford, Kent County, Delaware. The house was built about 1763, and is a two-story, three bay frame dwelling sheathed in cypress shingles. It has a double entrance. There is a two-story, one bay, brick addition with another front entrance. Both sections share a steep gable roof. There are rear frame additions. The interior features a large fireplace, winding stairs to the second floor, and front and rear doors, separated by a single board partition.

It was listed on the National Register of Historic Places in 1978.
