= Peter Lofland House =

Historic house in Delaware, United States

- U.S. National Register of Historic Places
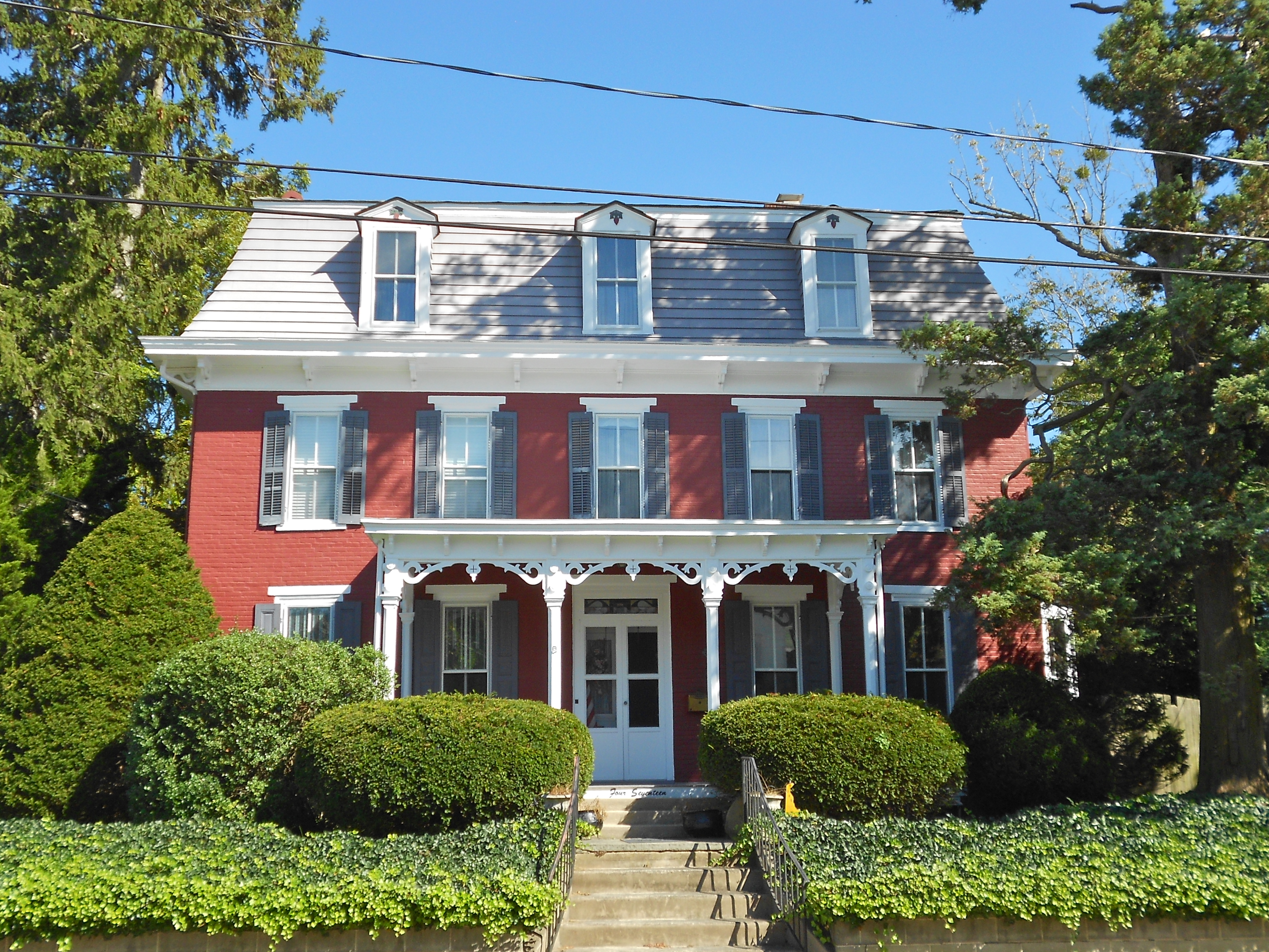
- The Peter Lofland House in 2013

- Location within Delaware Location within the United States
- Location: 417 N. Walnut St., Milford, Delaware
- Coordinates: 38°55′3″N 75°25′43″W
- Area: 0.4 acres (0.16 ha)
- Built: c. 1880
- MPS: Milford MRA
- NRHP reference No.: 82002321
- Added to NRHP: April 22, 1982

Peter Lofland House is a historic home located at Milford, Kent County, Delaware. It was built about 1880, and is a two-story, five-bay, L-shaped center hall brick dwelling with a mansard roof. It has a two-story rear wing. It features a three-bay with decorative brackets and a projecting bay.

It was listed on the National Register of Historic Places in 1982.
