= Old Fire House =

- U.S. National Register of Historic Places
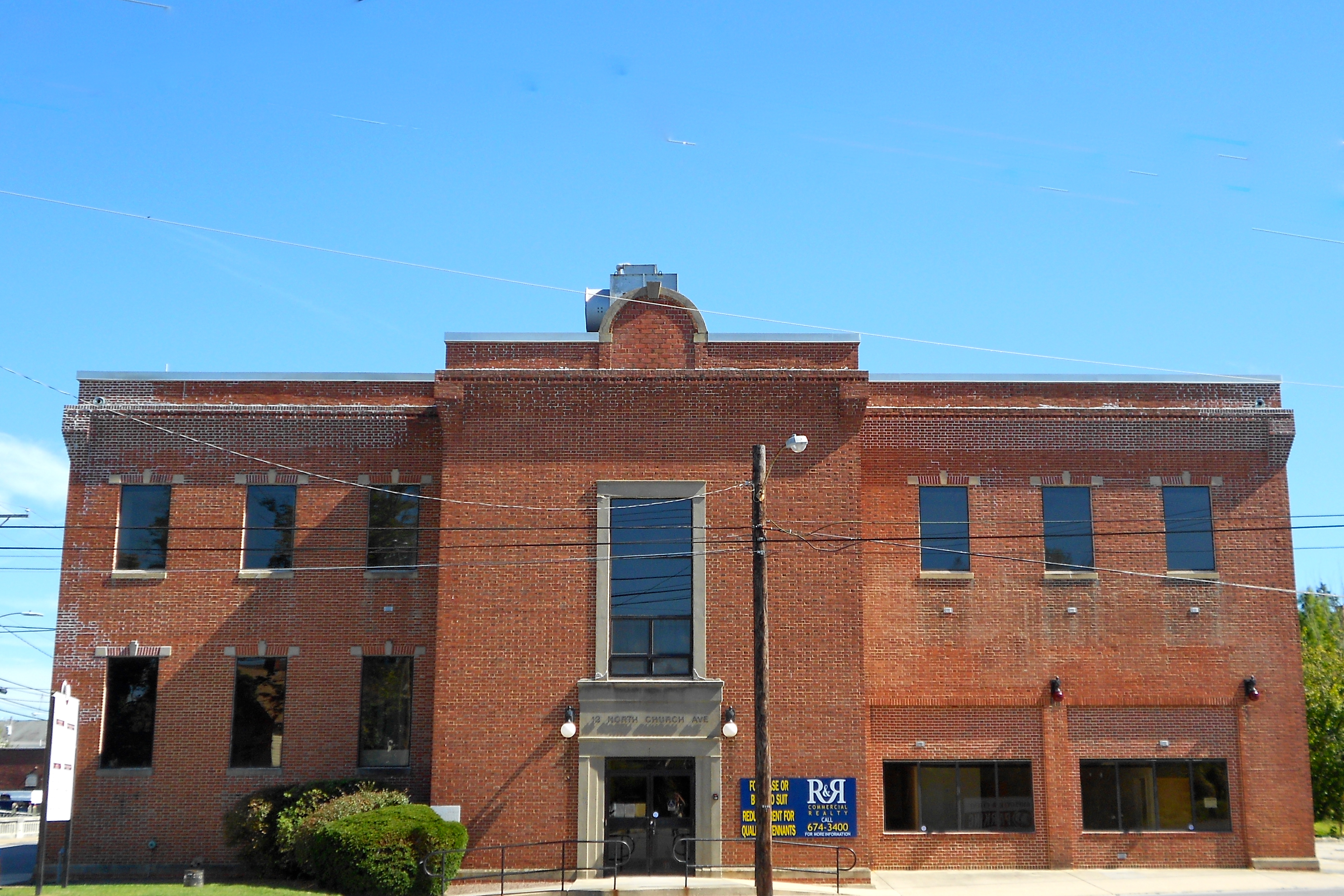
- The firehouse in 2013

- Location within Delaware Location within the United States
- Location: Church Ave., Milford, Delaware
- Coordinates: 38°54′52″N 75°25′50″W
- Area: 0.3 acres (0.12 ha)
- Built: 1925
- MPS: Milford MRA
- NRHP reference No.: 83001381
- Added to NRHP: January 7, 1983

Old Fire House is a historic fire station located at Milford, Kent County, Delaware. It was built in 1925 as a combination fire house for the Carlisle Fire Company and community center. It is a two-story, square brick building with a projecting two-story entrance wing and stair tower. It has a flat roof and cornice capped with pre-cast concrete blocks.

It was listed on the National Register of Historic Places in 1983.
