= Draper House (Milford, Delaware) =

Historic house in Delaware, United States

- U.S. National Register of Historic Places
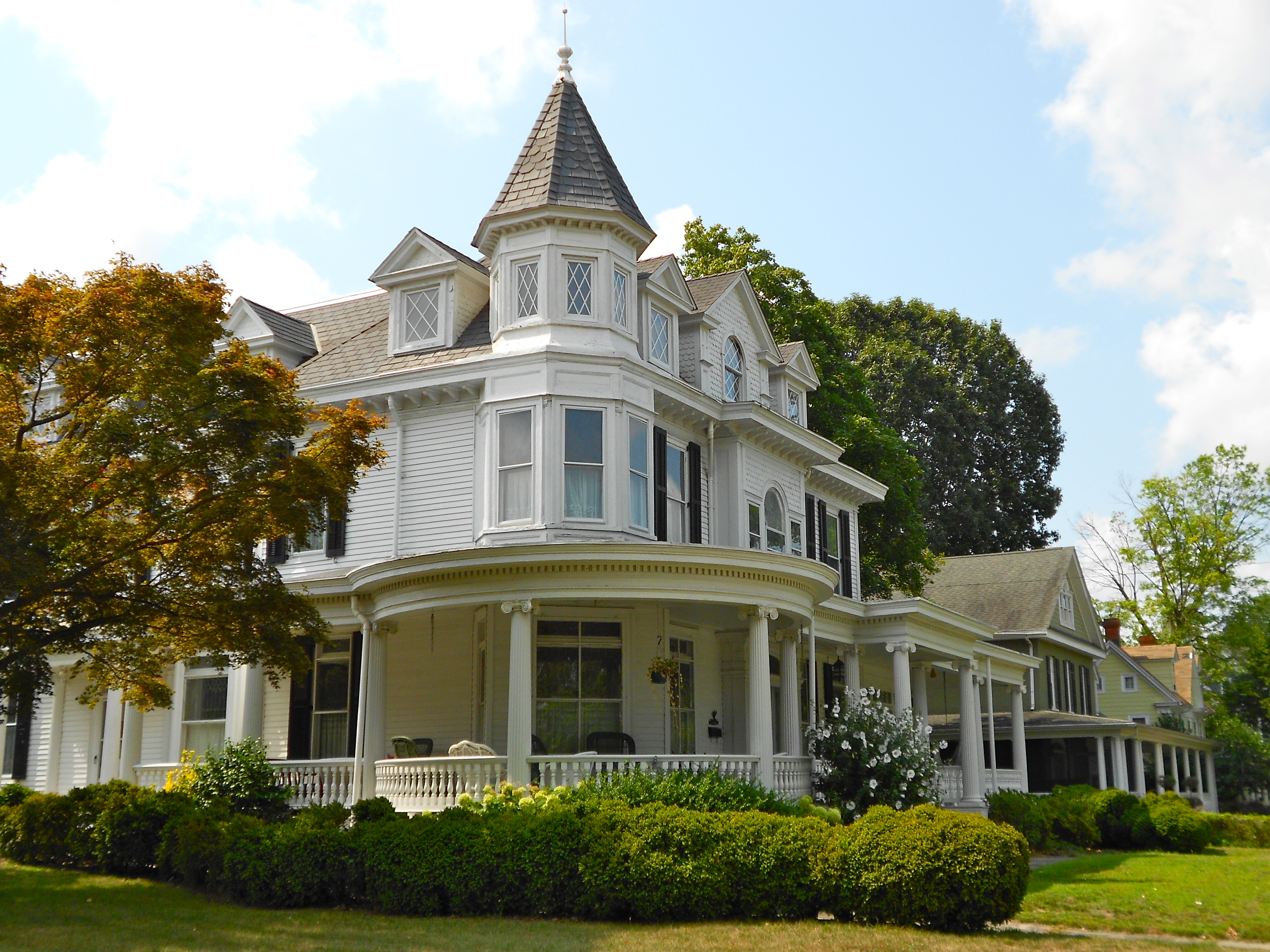

- Location within Delaware Location within the United States
- Location: 200 Lakeview Ave., Milford, Delaware
- Coordinates: 38°54′36″N 75°26′0″W
- Area: 1.3 acres (0.53 ha)
- Built: 1870
- Architectural style: Classical Revival, Gothic, Queen Anne
- MPS: Milford MRA
- NRHP reference No.: 82002365
- Added to NRHP: April 22, 1982

Draper House is a historic home located at Milford, Sussex County, Delaware. It was built in 1870, and is a two-story, five-bay, center hall, frame dwelling originally built in the Victorian Gothic style. It was remodeled in the early-20th century with elements of Queen Anne and Classical Revival building traditions. It has a hipped roof with dormers, a telescoping turret, a truncated tower, a second floor projecting bay with a Palladian window, and a full three-sided porch with a shadow curve supported by Ionic order columns. From 1948 to 1953, it was owned by the Milford Hospital and used by them as housing for nurses.

It was added to the National Register of Historic Places in 1982.
