= John Lofland =

John Lofland may refer to:

- John Lofland (poet) (1798–1849), American poet and writer, known as the Milford Bard
- John Lofland (sociologist) (1946–2026), American sociologist, professor, and author
