= Philip L. Cannon =

American politician (1850–1929)

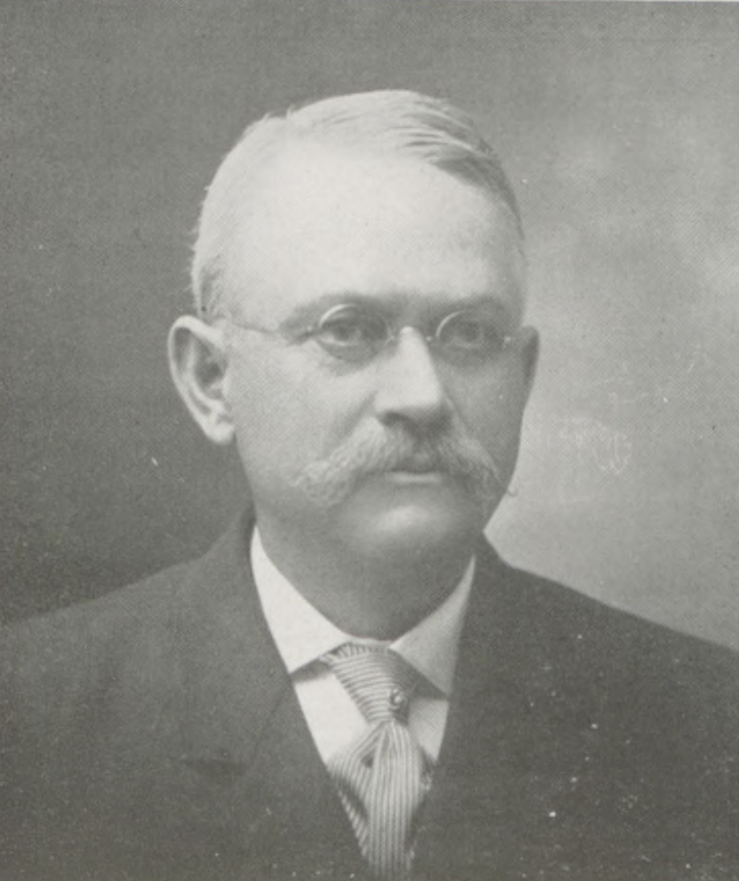
- Cannon circa 1903

1st Lieutenant Governor of Delaware
- In office January 15, 1901 – January 17, 1905
- Governor: John Hunn
- Preceded by: Office established
- Succeeded by: Isaac T. Parker

Personal details
- Born: June 28, 1850 Bridgeville, Delaware, U.S.
- Died: June 20, 1929 (aged 78) Lewes, Delaware, U.S.
- Party: Republican
- Spouse: Hester Polk
- Parent(s): William Cannon; Margaret Ann Barker

Philip Leonidas Cannon (June 28, 1850 – June 20, 1929) was an American banker and politician who served as the first Lieutenant Governor of Delaware from January 15, 1901, to January 17, 1905. Son of former Governor William Cannon, he was the first elected to the office under the Delaware Constitution of 1897 and served under 53rd Governor John Hunn.

== Life and career ==
Born in Bridgeville in Sussex County, Delaware, to parents William Cannon and Margaret Ann Barker, Cannon attended the Pennington Seminary and the Dickinson Grammar School and pursued the Latin Scientific Course at Dickinson College for two years starting in 1866. He did not graduate but went into business with his elder brother, Henry Pervis Cannon, operating a large farm and establishing a canning factory in 1881. However, he soon departed the cannery business to focus on banking and mercantile interests, serving as president of First National Bank of Seaford, Delaware, from 1890 until his death. Cannon remained one of Delaware's largest landowners and progressive farmers, owning hundreds of acres of peach orchards.

A member of the Republican Party, Cannon served as the first Lieutenant Governor of Delaware from 1901 to 1905. His name was bruited for US Senate, but nomination never materialized. He served as president of Delaware's Revenue and Taxation Commission until 1909 and as vice president of the state chapter of the American Bankers Association (1908–1909).

Cannon was a member of the Belles Lettres Literary Society and the Epilson chapter of Phi Kappa Sigma.

== Personal life ==
Cannon married Hester Polk Jacobs on June 25, 1874. The couple had three children: William (born 1875), Curtis Leonidas (born 1883), and Philip Holland (born 1893). Cannon died at Beebe Hospital in Lewes, Delaware, at the age of 78.

Political offices
New office	Lieutenant Governor of Delaware	Succeeded by Isaac T. Parker
