= Milford Shipyard Area Historic District =

Historic district in Delaware, United States

- U.S. National Register of Historic Places
- U.S. Historic district
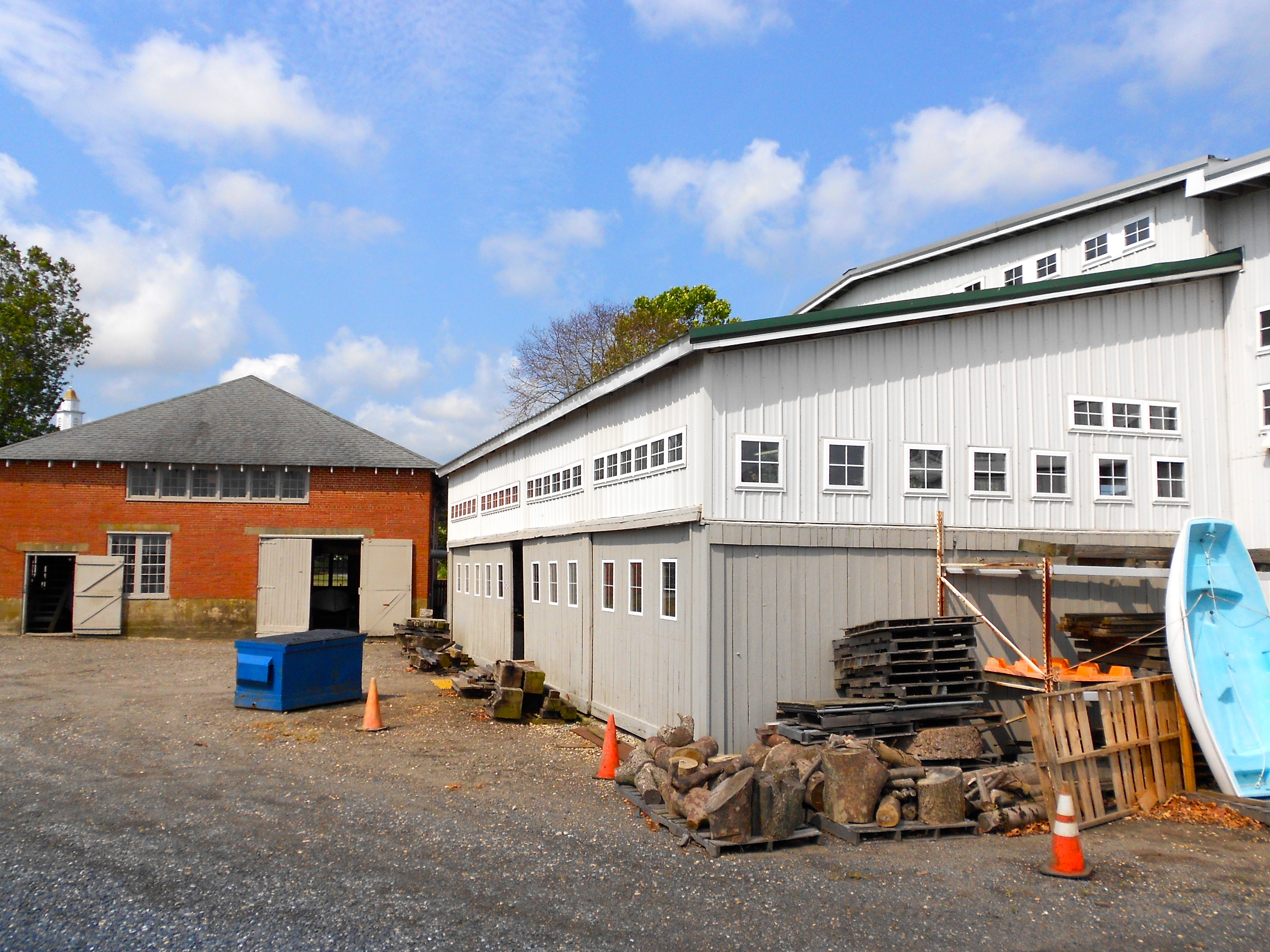

- Location within Delaware Location within the United States
- Location: Roughly bounded by Mispillion River, Franklin, Front and Marshall Sts., Milford, Delaware
- Coordinates: 38°54′46″N 75°25′24″W
- Area: 4 acres (1.6 ha)
- MPS: Milford MRA
- NRHP reference No.: 83001411
- Added to NRHP: January 7, 1983

Milford Shipyard Area Historic District is a national historic district located at Milford, Sussex County, Delaware. The district includes 18 contributing buildings, including the original Vinyard Shipyard (now Delaware Marine & Manufacturing) and surrounding workers' houses. The shipyard buildings are the combination office and warehouse (c. 1920), mold/sail loft (c. 1900), boat house (1929), and machine shop (c. 1930). The remaining buildings are primarily one and two-story, frame, center hall plan dwellings built around 1870.

It was added to the National Register of Historic Places in 1983.
