= Carlisle House (Milford, Delaware) =

Historic house in Delaware, United States

- U.S. National Register of Historic Places
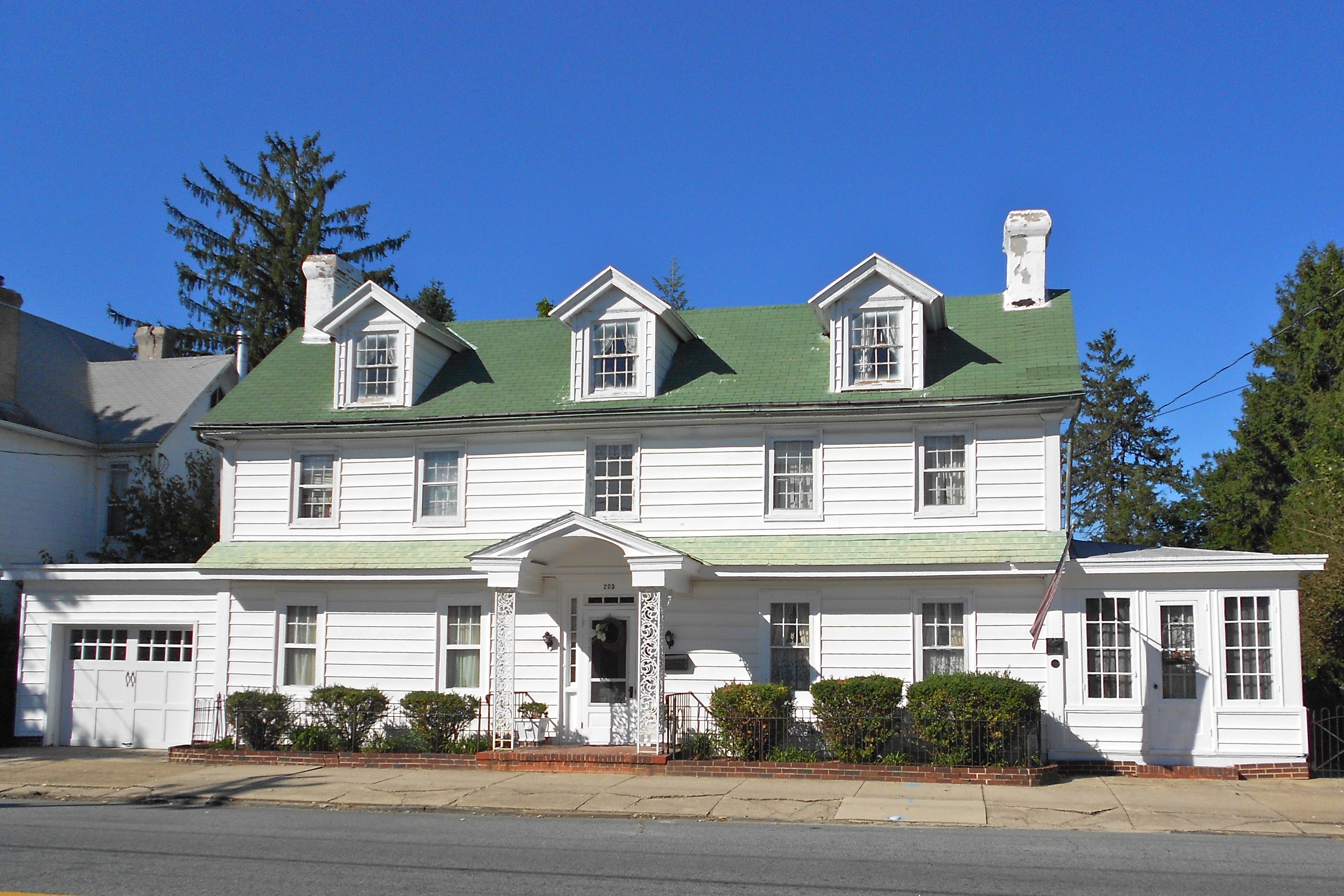

- Location within Delaware Location within the United States
- Location: 205 S. Front St., Milford, Delaware
- Coordinates: 38°54′45″N 75°25′32″W
- Area: 0.5 acres (0.20 ha)
- Built: 1794
- Built by: West, David
- MPS: Milford MRA
- NRHP reference No.: 82002364
- Added to NRHP: April 22, 1982

Carlisle House is a historic home located at Milford, Sussex County, Delaware. It was built in 1794, and is a two-story, five-bay, frame building with a gable roof with dormers. It has a two-story rear wing and two side wings; one a conservatory and the other a garage. It has a pent roof across the front with a pedimented entrance hood supported by paired Doric order columns. The house was built by a ship's carpenter, David West, and is one of the last surviving artifacts from a once prosperous shipbuilding industry.

It was added to the National Register of Historic Places in 1982.
