= 1862 Delaware gubernatorial election =

- November 4, 1862
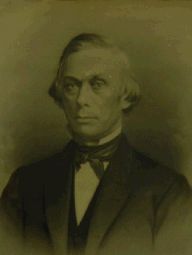

Nominee	William Cannon	Samuel Jefferson
Party	National Union	Democratic
Popular vote	8,155	8,044
Percentage	50.34%	49.66%
- County results Cannon: 50–60% Jefferson: 50–60%
Governor before election
William Burton
Democratic
Elected Governor
William Cannon
National Union

The 1862 Delaware gubernatorial election was held on November 4, 1862. Incumbent Democratic Governor William Burton was unable to seek re-election. Samuel Jefferson ran to succeed him as the Democratic nominee, and he faced National Union candidate William Cannon, the former State Treasurer. Cannon narrowly defeated Jefferson, and in so doing, was the last Republican-affiliated candidate to be elected Governor until 1894.

== General election ==
=== Results ===
1862 Delaware gubernatorial election
Party	Candidate	Votes	%	±%
National Union	William Cannon	8,155	50.34%	—
Democratic	Samuel Jefferson	8,044	49.66%	−1.01%
Majority		111	0.69%	−0.65%
Turnout		16,199	100.00%	
National Union gain from Democratic				

== Bibliography ==
- Gubernatorial Elections, 1787-1997. Washington, D.C.: Congressional Quarterly Inc. 1998. ISBN 1-56802-396-0.
- Glashan, Roy R. (1979). American Governors and Gubernatorial Elections, 1775-1978. Meckler Books. ISBN 0-930466-17-9.
- Dubin, Michael J. (2003). United States Gubernatorial Elections, 1776-1860: The Official Results by State and County. Jefferson, North Carolina: McFarland. ISBN 978-0-7864-1439-0.
- Delaware House Journal, 69th General Assembly, 1st Reg. Sess. (1863).
