= Grier House =

Historic house in Delaware, United States

- U.S. National Register of Historic Places
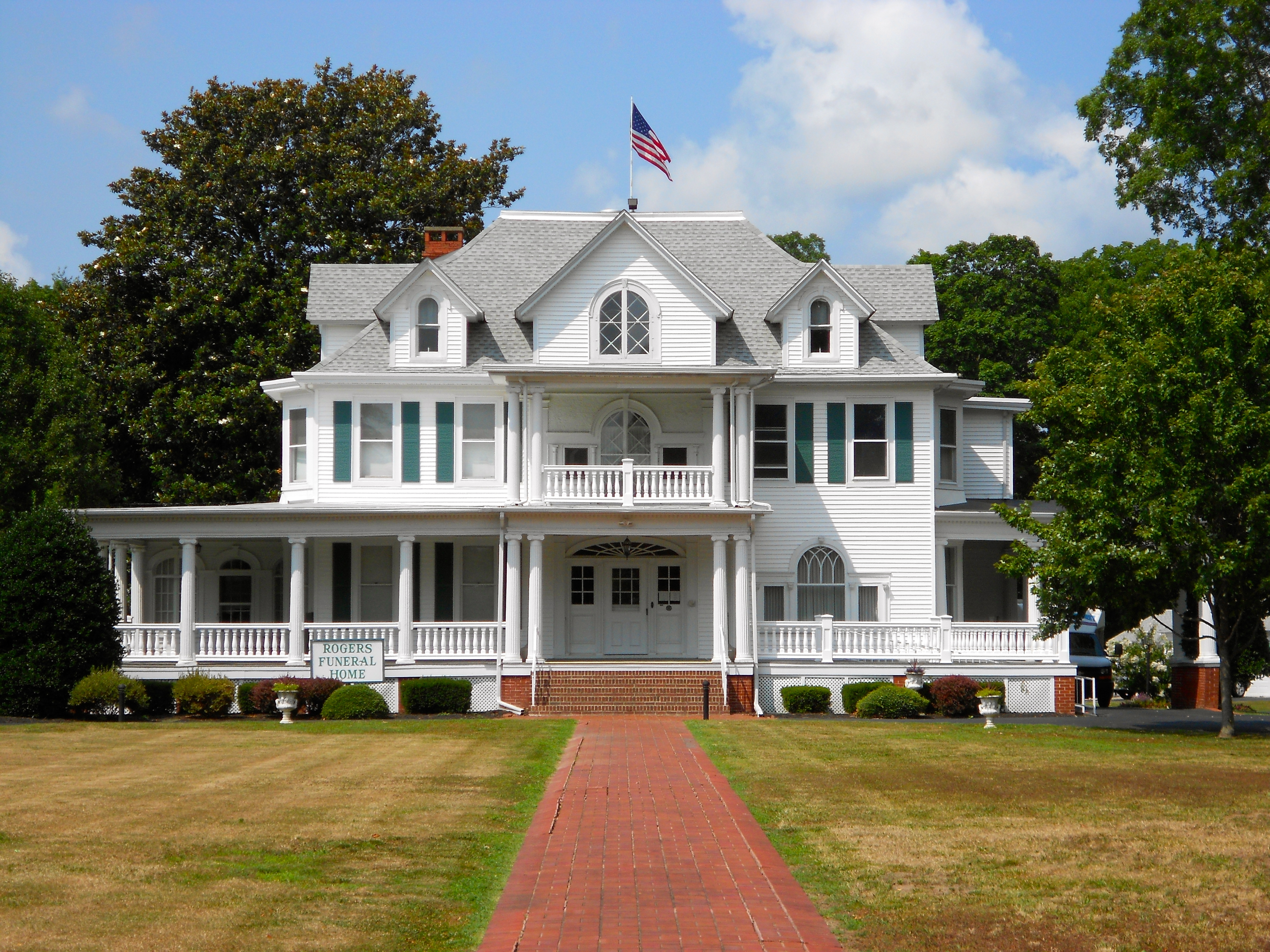

- Location within Delaware Location within the United States
- Location: 301 Lakeview Ave., Milford, Delaware
- Coordinates: 38°54′32″N 75°26′5″W
- Area: 2.8 acres (1.1 ha)
- Built: 1890; 136 years ago
- Architect: Morris & Whiteside
- Architectural style: Classical Revival, Queen Anne
- MPS: Milford MRA
- NRHP reference No.: 83001410
- Added to NRHP: January 7, 1983

Grier House, also known as Rogers Funeral Home, is a historic home located at Milford, Sussex County, Delaware. It was built in 1890, and is a two-story, five-bay, center-hall, frame dwelling in the Queen Anne style. It has hipped roof is pierced with dormers that have rounded window cornice heads. It features a projecting center bay that includes the entrance block, a Palladian window, and a two-story portico with slender, paired, fluted Ionic order columns. A porch extends a round the side and on the other side is a porte cochere. Between 1921 and 1923 the owner, Dr. Frank L. Grier, remodelled the house. The house was used as a funeral home.

It was added to the National Register of Historic Places in 1983.
