= Milford, Delaware =

City in Delaware, United States

- City
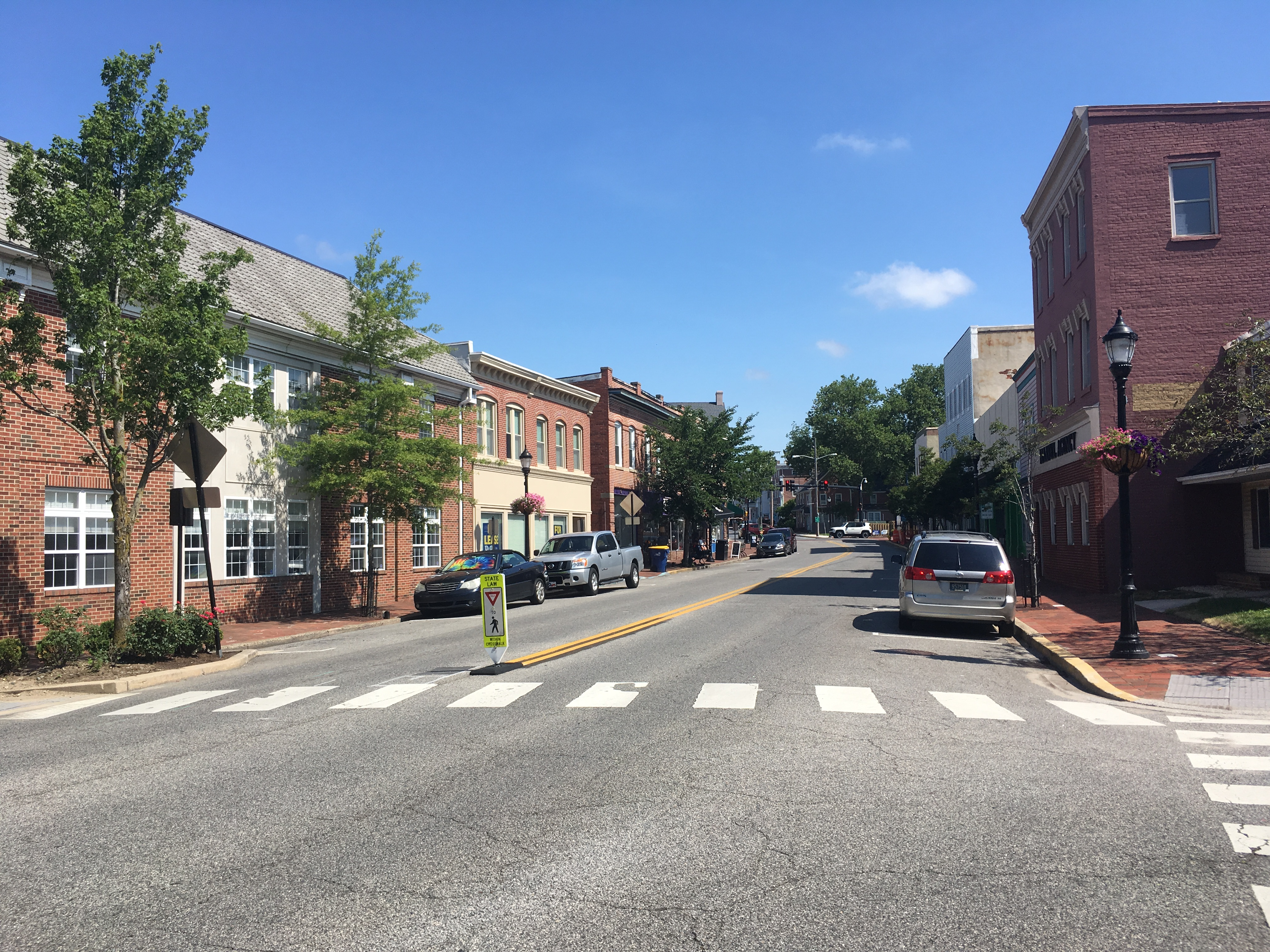
- Walnut Street in Milford in 2020

- Flag Seal Logo

- Location of Milford in Kent County and Sussex County, Delaware.

- Location within the state of Delaware Milford (the United States)
- Coordinates: 38°54′45″N 75°25′41″W
- Country: United States
- State: Delaware
- County: Kent, Sussex
- Settled: 1680
- Incorporated: February 5, 1807

Government
  - Type: Council-manager government
  - Mayor: F. Todd Culotta
  - City Manager: Mark Whitfield

Area
  - Total: 9.94 sq mi (25.75 km^{2})
  - Land: 9.85 sq mi (25.52 km^{2})
  - Water: 0.089 sq mi (0.23 km^{2})
- Elevation: 13 ft (4.0 m)

Population (2020)
  - Total: 11,190
  - Density: 1,135.6/sq mi (438.47/km^{2})
- Time zone: UTC−5 (Eastern (EST))
  - Summer (DST): UTC−4 (EDT)
- ZIP code: 19963
- Area code: 302
- FIPS code: 10-47420
- GNIS feature ID: 214308
- Website: www.cityofmilford.com

Milford is a city in Kent and Sussex counties in the U.S. state of Delaware. According to the 2020 census, the population of the city is 11,190 people and 4,356 households in the city.

The Kent County portion of Milford is part of the Dover metropolitan area and the Philadelphia metropolitan area, while the Sussex County portion is part of the Salisbury, MD-DE Metropolitan Statistical Area.

== History ==
The Kent County side of Milford was first settled in 1680 by Henry Bowan on what was known as the Saw Mill Range. A century later the Reverend Sydenham Thorne built a dam across the Mispillion River to generate power for his gristmill and sawmill. Around the same time, Joseph Oliver laid out the first city streets and plots nearby on a part of his plantation. Soon a number of homes and businesses appeared along Front Street. The city was incorporated February 5, 1807.

In the 1770s, a ship building industry was already flourishing on the Mispillion River. Shipbuilding continued to be the major industry of Milford through World War I, bringing considerable prosperity to the town. The high point came in 1917 when the four-masted, 174-foot (53 m) long Albert F. Paul was launched from the William G. Abbott shipyard. At one point six shipyards were operating in the downtown area. When the last of the area's giant white oaks was cut in the 1920s, the shipyards quickly went out of business, although the Mispillion ships sailed on for many years. (The Paul was sunk by a German torpedo in 1942 while sailing from the Bahamas.) The Vineyard shipyard was called into service in both World War I and II to build submarine chasers.

During much of the twentieth century Milford served primarily as the commercial center for much of southern Delaware's large agricultural community.

Seven of Delaware's governors have come from Milford: Daniel Rogers (who served 1797–99), Joseph Haslet (1811–14), William Tharp (1847–1851), Peter F. Causey (1855–59), William Burton (1859–63), William T. Watson (1895–97), and Ruth Ann Minner (2001–09).

Abbott's Mill, Bank House, Carlisle House, Christ Church, Dr. Dawson House, Draper House, Egglinton Hall, Golden Mine, Grier House, Peter Lofland House, James McColley House, Milford New Century Club, Milford Railroad Station, Milford Shipyard Area Historic District, Mill House, Mispillion Lighthouse and Beacon Tower, North Milford Historic District, Old Fire House, Parson Thorne Mansion, South Milford Historic District Walnut Farm, Gov. William T. Watson Mansion, and J. H. Wilkerson & Son Brickworks are listed on the National Register of Historic Places.

On May 30, 2003, a fire started in a second floor apartment next to Wiley Hardware & Appliance on Walnut Street in the historic downtown section of Milford. More than 200 firefighters from Milford, Ellendale, Harrington, Felton, Dover, Smyrna, Houston, Frederica, Slaughter Beach, Bowers Beach, Greenwood, South Bowers, Farmington, Magnolia, Cheswold, Lewes, Georgetown, and Bridgeville in Delaware and Greensboro and Goldsboro in Maryland fought the blaze which destroyed seven businesses, a church, and three apartments, destroying an entire city block in the historic section of town. No one was killed in the blaze, but one civilian and six firefighters were injured.

== Geography and climate ==
Milford is located at 38°54′45″N 75°25′41″W (38.9126129, −75.4279748), along the Mispillion River, which runs through the city.

According to the United States Census Bureau, the city has a total area of 9.87 square miles (25.6 km^{2}).

Temperatures range from 6 °C (43 °F) to 31 °C. Snowfall is prevalent in February with 14 cm (5.5 in). Precipitation is varied across the years, with February having the least (with 84 millimetres or 3.3 inches) and August having the most (with 117 millimetres or 4.6 inches)

Climate data for Milford, Delaware
Month	Jan	Feb	Mar	Apr	May	Jun	Jul	Aug	Sep	Oct	Nov	Dec	Year
Record high °F (°C)	79 (26)	78 (26)	90 (32)	97 (36)	99 (37)	102 (39)	106 (41)	103 (39)	99 (37)	95 (35)	86 (30)	76 (24)	106 (41)
Mean daily maximum °F (°C)	43 (6)	45 (7)	54 (12)	64 (18)	73 (23)	82 (28)	87 (31)	85 (29)	78 (26)	68 (20)	58 (14)	48 (9)	65 (19)
Mean daily minimum °F (°C)	24 (−4)	25 (−4)	33 (1)	42 (6)	52 (11)	62 (17)	67 (19)	65 (18)	57 (14)	46 (8)	36 (2)	29 (−2)	45 (7)
Record low °F (°C)	−11 (−24)	−11 (−24)	4 (−16)	16 (−9)	28 (−2)	36 (2)	39 (4)	43 (6)	34 (1)	19 (−7)	9 (−13)	−2 (−19)	−11 (−24)
Average precipitation inches (mm)	4.08 (104)	3.30 (84)	4.51 (115)	3.50 (89)	4.03 (102)	3.31 (84)	3.69 (94)	4.61 (117)	4.08 (104)	3.48 (88)	3.32 (84)	3.59 (91)	45.50 (1,156)
Average snowfall inches (cm)	3.9 (9.9)	5.4 (14)	0.9 (2.3)	0.1 (0.25)	0 (0)	0 (0)	0 (0)	0 (0)	0 (0)	0 (0)	0.2 (0.51)	1.5 (3.8)	12 (30.76)

== Demographics ==
Historical population
Census	Pop.	Note	%±
1860	1,178		—
1870	1,150		−2.4%
1880	1,240		7.8%
1890	2,555		106.0%
1900	2,500		−2.2%
1910	2,603		4.1%
1920	2,703		3.8%
1930	3,719		37.6%
1940	4,214		13.3%
1950	5,179		22.9%
1960	5,795		11.9%
1970	5,314		−8.3%
1980	5,366		1.0%
1990	6,040		12.6%
2000	6,732		11.5%
2010	9,559		42.0%
2020	11,190		17.1%
U.S. Decennial Census

=== Racial and ethnic composition ===
Milford city, Delaware – Racial and ethnic composition Note: the US Census treats Hispanic/Latino as an ethnic category. This table excludes Latinos from the racial categories and assigns them to a separate category. Hispanics/Latinos may be of any race.
Race / Ethnicity (NH = Non-Hispanic)	Pop 2000	Pop 2010	Pop 2020	% 2000	% 2010	% 2020
White alone (NH)	4,343	5,654	5,951	64.51%	59.15%	53.18%
Black or African American alone (NH)	1,547	2,054	2,563	22.98%	21.49%	22.90%
Native American or Alaska Native alone (NH)	22	31	39	0.33%	0.32%	0.35%
Asian alone (NH)	67	100	211	1.00%	1.05%	1.89%
Native Hawaiian or Pacific Islander alone (NH)	6	6	1	0.09%	0.06%	0.01%
Other race alone (NH)	6	18	53	0.09%	0.19%	0.47%
Mixed race or Multiracial (NH)	147	186	520	2.18%	1.95%	4.65%
Hispanic or Latino (any race)	594	1,510	1,852	8.82%	15.80%	16.55%
Total	6,732	9,559	11,190	100.00%	100.00%	100.00%

=== 2020 census ===
As of the 2020 census, Milford had a population of 11,190. The median age was 39.9 years. 23.2% of residents were under the age of 18 and 22.4% of residents were 65 years of age or older. For every 100 females there were 86.8 males, and for every 100 females age 18 and over there were 80.9 males age 18 and over.

99.0% of residents lived in urban areas, while 1.0% lived in rural areas.

There were 4,465 households in Milford, of which 31.0% had children under the age of 18 living in them. Of all households, 38.9% were married-couple households, 16.7% were households with a male householder and no spouse or partner present, and 36.7% were households with a female householder and no spouse or partner present. About 31.4% of all households were made up of individuals and 15.4% had someone living alone who was 65 years of age or older.

There were 4,865 housing units, of which 8.2% were vacant. The homeowner vacancy rate was 1.7% and the rental vacancy rate was 5.8%.

Racial composition as of the 2020 census
Race	Number	Percent
White	6,211	55.5%
Black or African American	2,637	23.6%
American Indian and Alaska Native	82	0.7%
Asian	214	1.9%
Native Hawaiian and Other Pacific Islander	2	0.0%
Some other race	1,047	9.4%
Two or more races	997	8.9%

== Education ==
Milford School District operates public schools.

== Infrastructure ==
=== Transportation ===
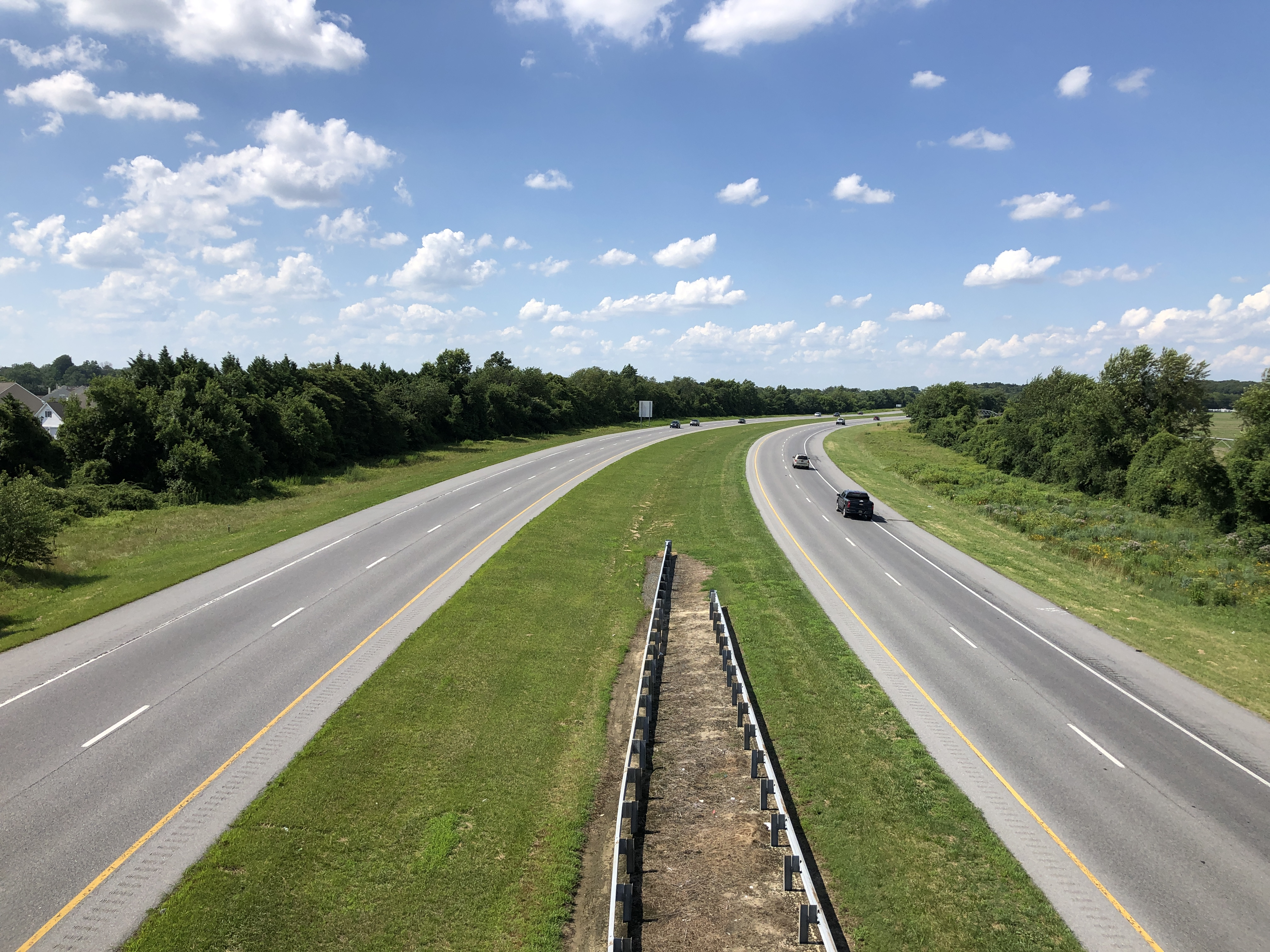
DE 1 northbound on the south side of Milford

Milford is served by several state roads connecting it to other points in Delaware. Delaware Route 1 bypasses Milford to the east along the Milford Bypass and heads north to Dover and southeast to the Delaware Beaches. A business route of DE 1, Delaware Route 1 Business, passes through the city along Rehoboth Boulevard and North Walnut Street. U.S. Route 113 begins at DE 1 at the north end of the Milford and heads south through the city on Dupont Boulevard, continuing south to Georgetown. Delaware Route 14 runs east–west through the city on Northwest Front Street and Northeast Front Street, heading west to Harrington and east to its terminus at the DE 1 bypass. Delaware Route 36 runs east–west through the city on Lakeview Avenue, Causey Avenue, and Southeast Front Street, heading southwest to Greenwood and east to Slaughter Beach. Delaware Route 15 begins at DE 14 west of Milford and heads northwest to Canterbury. Delaware Route 30 begins at DE 1 and DE 1 Business southeast of Milford and heads south toward Milton and Millsboro. DART First State provides bus service to Milford along Route 210, which runs through the city between the Bayhealth Hospital, Sussex Campus and the Walmart in the northern part of Milford; Route 303, which runs north to Dover and south to Georgetown; and Route 307, which runs north to Dover and south to Lewes. The Indian River Subdivision line of the Delmarva Central Railroad passes through Milford.

=== Utilities ===
The City of Milford provides electricity to the city, operating a substation and over 100 miles (160 km) of overhead lines and over 50 miles (80 km) of underground lines. The city's electric department is a member of the Delaware Municipal Electric Corporation (DEMEC) and purchases its power from the PJM Power Grid. The City of Milford serves about 6,500 customers. The Public Works department provides water, sewer, trash and recycling collection to Milford. Natural gas service in Milford is provided by Chesapeake Utilities.

Milford is home to the Milford Solar Farm, a 15 MW, 80 acre solar power farm owned by the Public Service Enterprise Group and is the largest solar power farm in Delaware. DEMEC purchases the power generated from the solar farm.

=== Health care ===
Bayhealth Medical Center operates the Bayhealth Hospital, Sussex Campus in Milford. The hospital offers various inpatient services include a birthing room and cardiovascular and cancer services. The Sussex Campus also offers numerous outpatient services, patient and family support services, community outreach, and imaging services. The hospital has a 24-hour emergency room with a Level III trauma center. On May 27, 2016, Bayhealth Medical Center broke ground on the Bayhealth Sussex Campus to replace the former Milford Memorial Hospital. The six-story hospital cost between $275 million and $300 million to build. Bayhealth Sussex Campus opened on February 5, 2019. Milford Memorial Hospital will be converted by Nationwide Health Services into a multi-use healthcare-focused community that would include a nursing home.

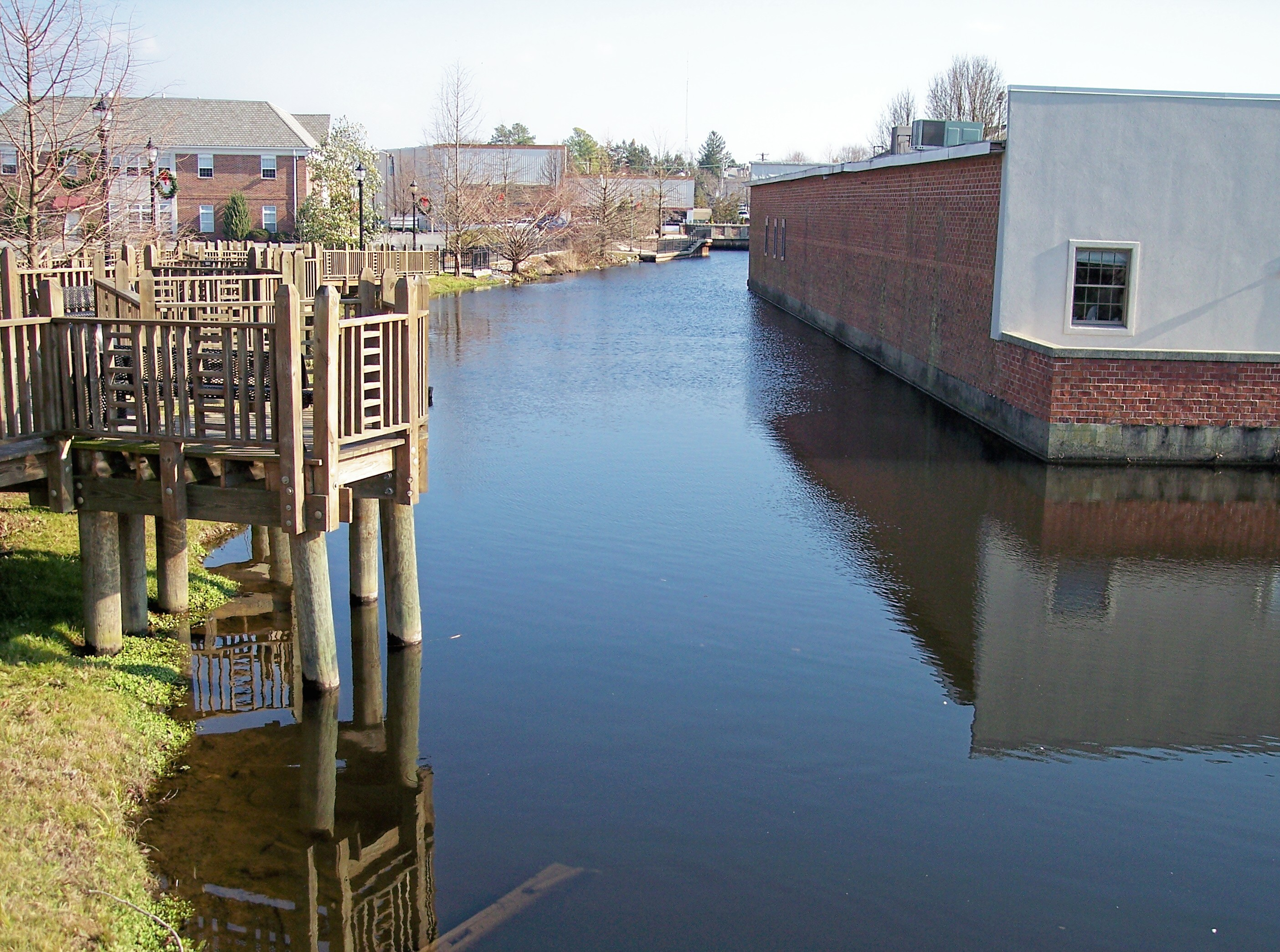
A pedestrian boardwalk parallels the Mispillion River in Milford

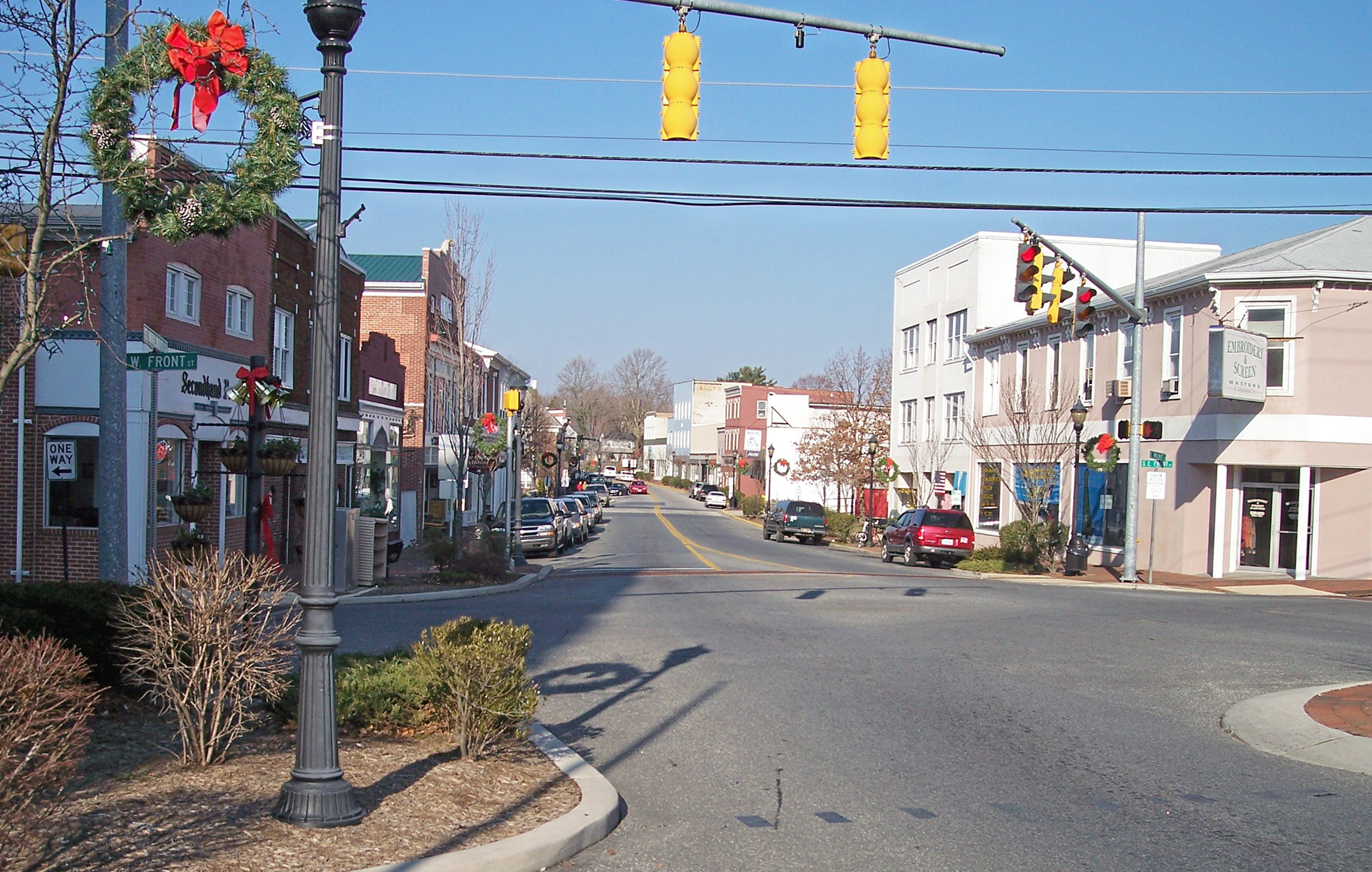
Walnut Street in Milford in 2006

== Notable people ==
- Mike Bagley, commentator for Motor Racing Network and co-host of The Morning Drive on Sirius XM NASCAR Radio
- Jeff Baldwin, baseball player
- Robert Crumb, a famous cartoonist, lived in Milford for a few years and attended high school there
- Albert Jackson, the first black letter carrier in Canada
- William L. Kent, two-time Delaware police detective of the year, retired Dover Police Department
- Simmie Knox began to teach himself to paint while living in Milford as a young man; he later became the first African-American to paint an official presidential portrait – that of President Bill Clinton
- John Lofland (1798–1849), widely known as the "Milford Bard", was a prolific and widely read writer of prose, verse and speeches; he grew up and spent much of his life in "The Towers" on North West Front Street
- Ruth Ann Minner, Governor of Delaware 2001–2009
- Harold Peterman, state legislator
- Luke Petitgout, former American football offensive tackle played in the National Football League for the New York Giants and Tampa Bay Buccaneers
- Chris Short, star baseball pitcher for Philadelphia Phillies in 1960s, was born in Milford
- Alfred Thomas Archimedes Torbert, Union General in the Civil War, namesake of Battery Torbert at Fort Delaware
- William T. Watson, 49th Governor of Delaware
- Bobby Wilkins, champion race car driver
