= South Milford Historic District =

Historic district in Delaware, United States

- U.S. National Register of Historic Places
- U.S. Historic district
- Location within Delaware Location within the United States
- Location: Roughly bounded by Mispillion River, Maple Ave., Church and Washington Sts., Milford, Delaware
- Coordinates: 38°54′37″N 75°25′42″W
- Area: 28 acres (11 ha)
- Architectural style: Queen Anne, Gothic Revival
- MPS: Milford MRA
- NRHP reference No.: 83001358
- Added to NRHP: January 7, 1983

South Milford Historic District, or Victorian South Milford Historic District, is a national historic district located at Milford, Sussex County, Delaware. The district includes 68 contributing buildings. The northernmost part of the district includes part of Milford's central business district. It primarily consists of frame dwellings located on large town lots and a small number of brick commercial structures. They are in a variety of popular styles including Queen Anne and Gothic Revival. Notable buildings include the Windsor Block (1872), Milford Trust Company building, old Post Office building (1910), Adkins House (c. 1860), Causey Mansion (1763), Garrison House, and Causey House (C. 1900).

It was added to the National Register of Historic Places in 1983.
