= Mill House (Milford, Delaware) =

Historic house in Delaware, United States

- U.S. National Register of Historic Places
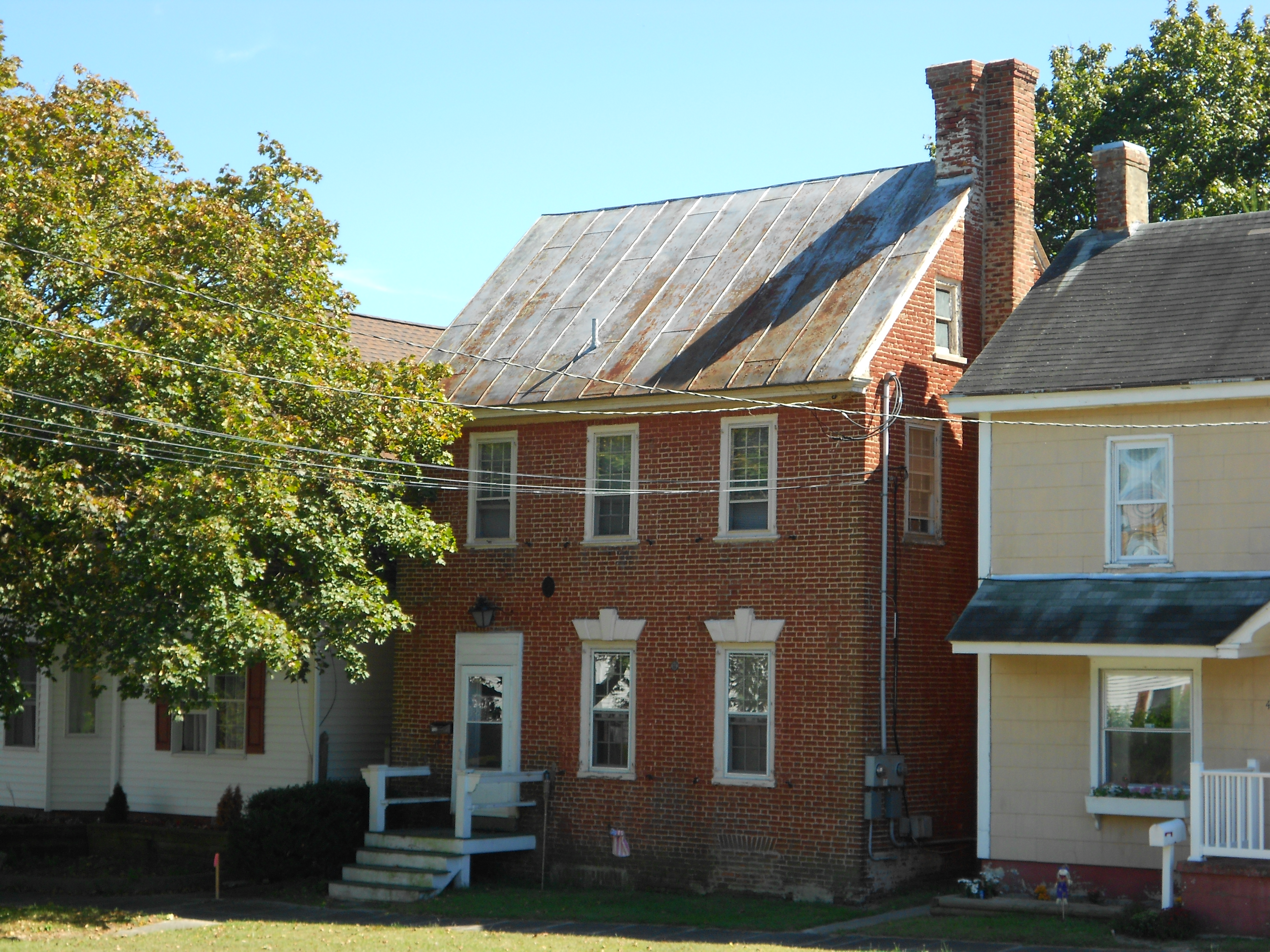
- Mill House in 2013.

- Location within Delaware Location within the United States
- Location: 414 NW Front St., Milford, Delaware
- Coordinates: 38°54′47″N 75°26′5″W
- Area: 0.1 acres (0.040 ha)
- Architectural style: Georgian
- MPS: Milford MRA
- NRHP reference No.: 83001380
- Added to NRHP: January 7, 1983

Mill House is a historic home located at Milford, Kent County, Delaware. The house is located across from the Parson Thorne Mansion. It is a late-18th century, two-story, three-bay, brick dwelling with a frame rear wing. It has a 2/3 Georgian side hall plan. It was owned by Delaware Governor Peter F. Causey (1801–1871) and was a rental property for the family.

It was listed on the National Register of Historic Places in 1983.
