= William H. H. Ross =

American politician (1814–1887)

William H.H. Ross
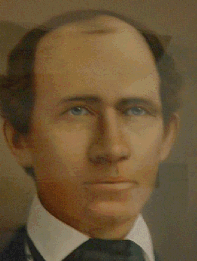

37th Governor of Delaware
- In office January 21, 1851 – January 16, 1855
- Preceded by: William Tharp
- Succeeded by: Peter F. Causey

Personal details
- Born: William Henry Harrison Ross; June 2, 1814 Laurel, Delaware, U.S.
- Died: June 29, 1887 (aged 73) Philadelphia, Pennsylvania, U.S.
- Party: Democratic
- Spouse: Emeline Hall
- Occupation: Farmer

William Henry Harrison Ross (June 2, 1814 – June 29, 1887) was an American politician from Seaford, in Sussex County, Delaware, United States. He was a member of the Democratic Party who served as Governor of Delaware.

== Early life and family ==
Ross was born in Laurel, Delaware, son of Caleb and Letitia Lofland Ross. He grew up in Laurel, attending the Laurel Academy, and later went to Claremount Academy in Pennsylvania. The Ross family had many business interests, and William added to them by beginning to grow peaches on their property. Like his father, he one day would become a director of the Farmers' Bank of Delaware.

He married Emeline Hall in 1840, and they had ten children, Letitia Lofland, Caleb, George Hall, James Jefferson, William Madison, Edgar Calhoun, Sarah A., Mary G., Laura F., and John Wood. They lived at the Ross Mansion, just north of Seaford, and were members of the St. Luke's Episcopal Church, Seaford, Delaware.

== Professional and political career ==
Ross was a regular delegate to the Democratic National Convention, attending in 1844, 1848, 1856, and 1860. In his only attempt at public office, Ross ran for governor in 1850, against Thomas Lockwood of Frederica. Lockwood, the Temperance Party candidate, was the main contender, there being no effective Whig candidate. Ross ran with U.S. Representative George R. Riddle and a slogan of "Ross, Riddle and Reform." They were both successful, and Ross served as Governor of Delaware from January 21, 1851, until January 14, 1855. At age 36, he was the youngest person ever elected Governor of Delaware.

In 1852, the long-contemplated building of the north–south Delaware Railroad finally got underway. In the works since the company was chartered in 1836, funds were finally raised and a route laid out. Constitutional reform was also seriously considered at this time. By 1850, New Castle County had nearly half the population of the state, but only one third of the representation in the Delaware General Assembly. This and other populist measures led the Democrats to call for a Constitutional Convention to address them. Using methods that were probably unconstitutional, the Democrats managed to get the convention convened in December 1852, but the majority of the delegates were Whigs. After several months of negotiation, compromises were reached that satisfied no one and the whole effort was resoundingly rejected at the polls. The Constitution of 1831 would remain in effect.

Delaware General Assembly (sessions while Governor)
Year	Assembly	Senate Majority	Speaker	House Majority	Speaker
1851–1852	66th	Democratic	John M. Phillips	Democratic	Samuel Jefferson
1853–1854	67th	Democratic	John M. Phillips	Democratic	John R. McFee

== Slavery and the Civil War ==
Ross was a slaveholder and obviously sympathetic with the various arguments intended to preserve it. "'Slavery might be dying in Delaware,' he said, but he was convinced a majority of the citizens in the state supported the rights of the slaves states." As if to agree with his point, the General Assembly again refused proposals to allow African Americans to testify in courts of law, or to travel freely.

Ross knew what his reputation was, and with the outbreak of the Civil War in early 1861, and especially after one of his sons joined the Confederate States Army, Ross left for England for a few months. He tried returning a year later, but by 1863 had left for the duration of the war. While he was in exile he wrote, "Not that I am guilty of any act against the government of the U.S., but I am considered to entertain opinions which are pronounced by some people as disloyal. For that reason I remain out of the country, hoping that the American people may some day return to their reason, [when] I may return in safety to spend the remainder of my days in a country ruined by the madness and fanaticism of its own people." Ross returned, and lost many of his investments, but by his act of avoidance, probably prevented further personal ruin.

Ross was but the most wealthy and most visible of many persons in Delaware equally sympathetic with the cause of the Confederacy. Most of his peers and neighbors felt the same way, and the strength of their pro-slavery feelings was matched only by awareness that the very existence of Delaware required its membership in a strong Union. Refusing to give up either opinion, the important decisions were simply made elsewhere.

== Death and legacy ==
Ross died at Philadelphia, Pennsylvania, on June 29, 1887, and is buried in the St. Luke's Episcopal Churchyard at Seaford.

The Gov. William H. Ross House was added to the National Register of Historic Places in 1977.

== Almanac ==
Elections are held the first Tuesday after November 1. The governor takes office the third Tuesday of January and has a four-year term.

Public Offices
Office	Type	Location	Began office	Ended office	notes
Governor	Executive	Dover	January 21, 1851	January 16, 1855	

Election results
Year	Office	Subject	Party	Votes	%	Opponent	Party	Votes	%
1850	Governor	William H.H. Ross	Democratic	6,001	48%	Peter F. Causey	Independent	5,978	48%

== Images ==
- Hall of Governors Portrait Gallery; Portrait courtesy of Historical and Cultural Affairs, Dover.

== Places with more information ==
- Delaware Historical Society; website; 505 North Market Street, Wilmington, Delaware 19801; (302) 655-7161
- University of Delaware; Library website; 181 South College Avenue, Newark, Delaware 19717; (302) 831-2965
- Governor Ross Mansion and Plantation; 203 High Street, Seaford, Delaware 19973; (302) 628-9829

Party political offices
Preceded by William Tharp	Democratic nominee for Governor of Delaware; 1850	Succeeded by William Burton
Political offices
Preceded by William Tharp	Governor of Delaware; 1851–1855	Succeeded by Peter F. Causey
