= Parson Thorne Mansion =

Historic house in Delaware, United States

- U.S. National Register of Historic Places
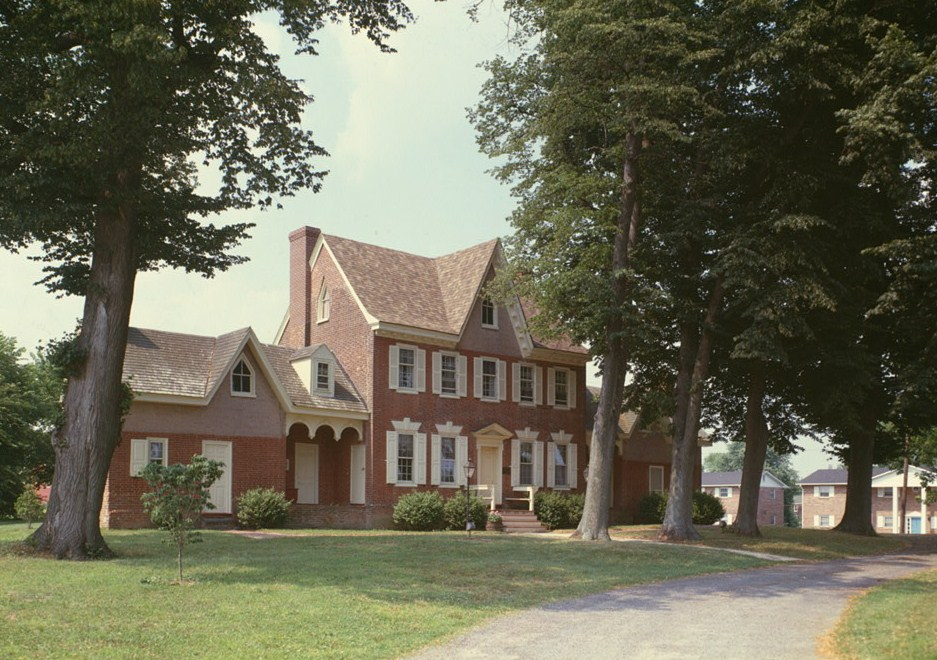
- Parson Thorne Mansion, HABS Photo, July 1982

- Location within Delaware Location within the United States
- Location: 501 N.W. Front St., Milford, Delaware
- Coordinates: 38°54′49″N 75°26′7″W
- Area: 1.5 acres (0.61 ha)
- Built: 1730–1735
- Architectural style: Georgian
- NRHP reference No.: 71000222
- Added to NRHP: June 21, 1971

Parson Thorne Mansion, also known as Silver Hill, is a historic mansion located at Milford, Kent County, Delaware. The mansion is located across from the Mill House. It was built between 1730 and 1735, and is a two-story, five-bay, center hall brick dwelling in the Georgian style. It has flanking one-story wings and a two-story frame rear wing. The house was remodeled in 1879, and features a steeply pitched cross-gable roof with dormers. It was the home of Delaware Governor William Burton (1789–1866) and the boyhood home of statesman John M. Clayton (1796–1856).

It was listed on the National Register of Historic Places in 1971.
