= 1850 Delaware gubernatorial election =

- November 5, 1850
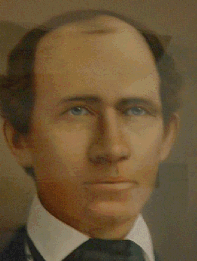

Nominee	William H. H. Ross	Peter F. Causey
Party	Democratic	Whig
Popular vote	6,001	5,978
Percentage	48.26%	48.07%
- County results Ross: 40–50% 50–60% Causey: 50–60%
Governor before election
William Tharp
Democratic
Elected Governor
William H. H. Ross
Democratic

The 1850 Delaware gubernatorial election was held on November 5, 1850. Incumbent Democratic Governor William Tharp was unable to seek re-election. Banker William H. H. Ross ran as the Democratic nominee to succeed Tharp and he faced former State Representative Peter F. Causey, the 1846 Whig nominee, and Temperance nominee Thomas Lockwood. Ross defeated Causey by a narrow margin, winning by just 23 votes and falling short of a majority.

== General election ==
=== Results ===
1850 Delaware gubernatorial election
Party	Candidate	Votes	%	±%
Democratic	William H. H. Ross	6,001	48.26%	−2.30%
Whig	Peter F. Causey	5,978	48.07%	−1.37%
Temperance	Thomas Lockwood	456	3.67%	—
Majority		23	0.18%	−0.93%
Turnout		12,435	100.00%	
Democratic hold				

== Bibliography ==
- Gubernatorial Elections, 1787-1997. Washington, D.C.: Congressional Quarterly Inc. 1998. ISBN 1-56802-396-0.
- Glashan, Roy R. (1979). American Governors and Gubernatorial Elections, 1775-1978. Meckler Books. ISBN 0-930466-17-9.
- Dubin, Michael J. (2003). United States Gubernatorial Elections, 1776-1860: The Official Results by State and County. Jefferson, North Carolina: McFarland. ISBN 978-0-7864-1439-0.
