= James McColley House =

Historic house in Delaware, United States

- U.S. National Register of Historic Places
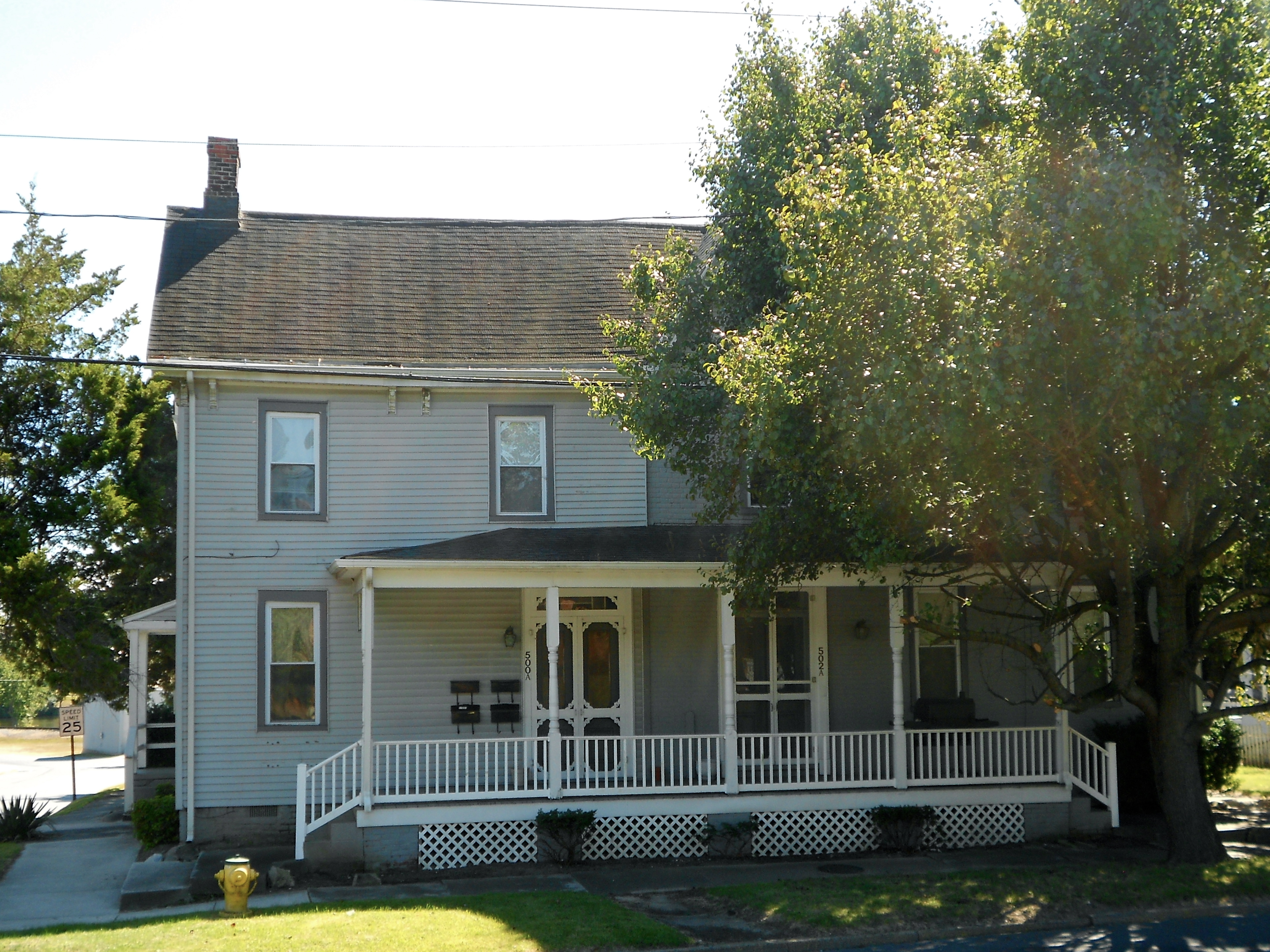
- James McColley House in 2013.

- Location within Delaware Location within the United States
- Location: 500-502 NW Front St., Milford, Delaware
- Coordinates: 38°54′46″N 75°26′7″W
- Area: 0.2 acres (0.081 ha)
- Built by: Henry Paine
- Architectural style: Gothic, Georgian
- MPS: Milford MRA
- NRHP reference No.: 83001354
- Added to NRHP: January 7, 1983

James McColley House is a historic home located at Milford in Kent County, Delaware. It is a two-story, five-bay, brick-and-frame dwelling in two sections. The brick section is the older section and dates to about 1790. It is in the full Georgian plan. Sometime during the second quarter of the 19th century, the house was changed to a Victorian Gothic Revival style. The house has a double entrance door and cross-gable roof with box cornice and decorative brackets.

It was listed on the National Register of Historic Places in 1983.
