= Christ Church (Milford, Delaware) =

Historic church in Delaware, United States

- U.S. National Register of Historic Places
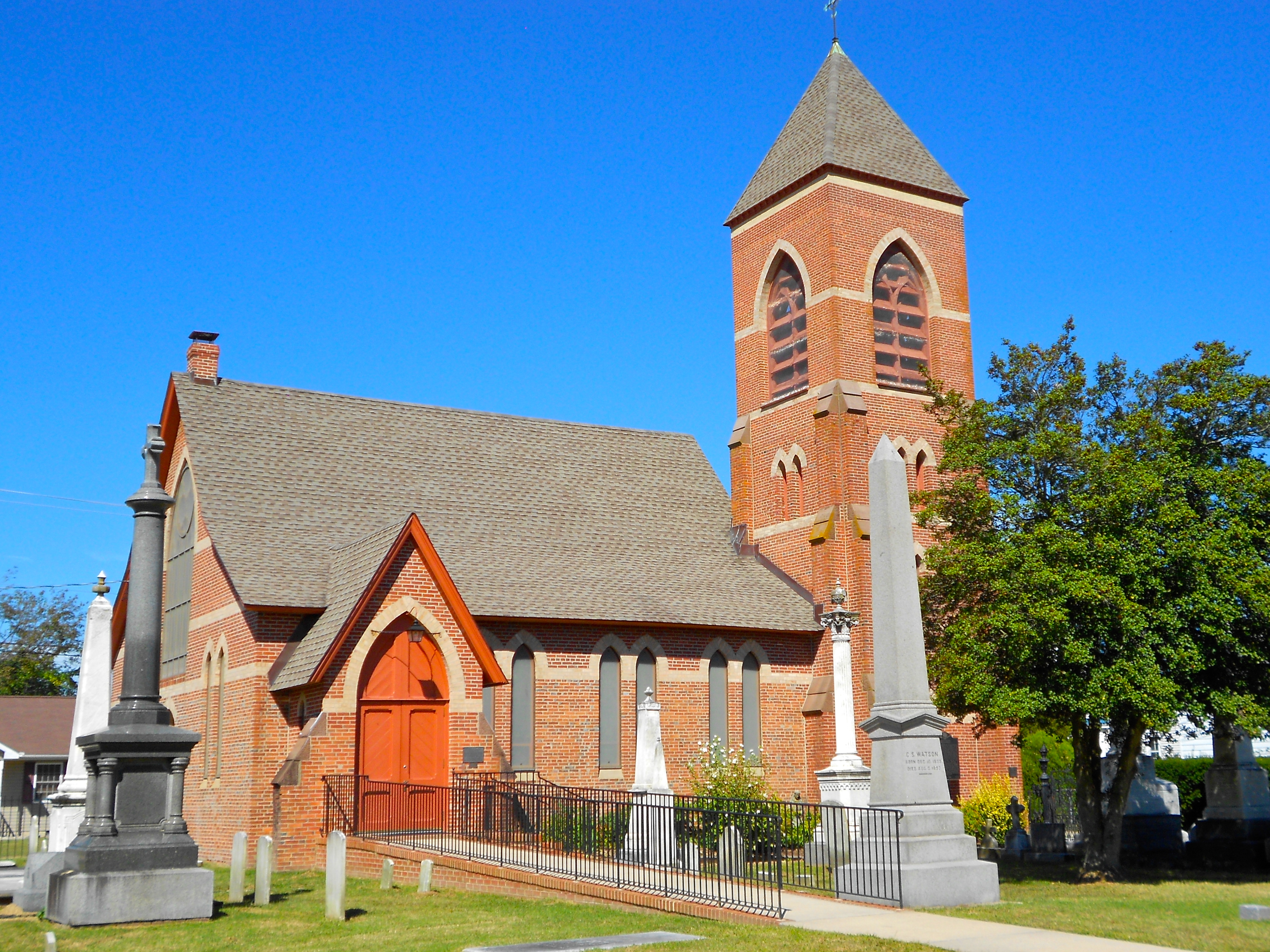
- Christ Church in Milford, Delaware

- Location within Delaware Location within the United States
- Location: 3rd and Church Sts., Milford, Delaware
- Coordinates: 38°54′56″N 75°25′55″W
- Area: 1 acre (0.40 ha)
- Built: 1791–1835
- Architectural style: Gothic Revival
- NRHP reference No.: 73000502
- Added to NRHP: May 8, 1973

Christ Church is a historic Episcopal church and cemetery in Milford, Delaware, in Kent County, Delaware. The congregation is part of the Episcopal Diocese of Delaware. The church building is a brick Gothic Revival structure and was added to the National Register of Historic Places in 1973.

In 2023, the church reported 232 members. Average Sunday Attendance (ASA) reported by the church in 2024 was 48 persons. No membership statistics were reported in 2024 national parochial reports.

== History ==
The congregation traces its history to Christ Church Mispillion. The Rev. Thomas Crawford first held services of the Church of England in lower Kent County in 1704. An earlier church was located at Church Hill, approximately three miles west of Milford.

The Rev. Sydenham Thorne, the parish's first resident rector, was instrumental in relocating the church to the developing town of Milford. Construction of the church in Milford began in 1791 but was interrupted by Thorne's death in 1793. The Rev. Corry Chambers is credited with completing the structure, which was consecrated on January 26, 1836.

Originally constructed in a colonial style, the church was remodeled and enlarged in the Gothic style between 1863 and 1865. The bell tower was added in 1895.

The church was added to the National Register of Historic Places on May 8, 1973.

== Churchyard ==
The historic churchyard contains the graves of several notable Delaware figures, including Joseph Oliver, a founder of Milford, and Delaware governors William Tharp and William Burton.

== Parish ==
Christ Church is a parish of the Episcopal Diocese of Delaware. The Rev. Harry Hiltner serves as rector.
