= John Lofland (poet) =

American poet

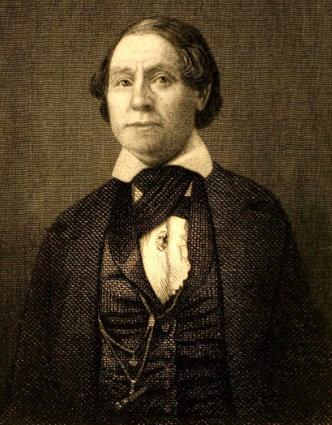
- A portrait of John Lofland
- Born: March 17, 1798; Milford, Delaware
- Died: January 22, 1849 (aged 50); Wilmington, Delaware
- Occupation: Writer

John Lofland (1798–1849), widely known as the "Milford Bard" of Milford, Delaware, was a prolific and widely read writer of prose, verse, and speeches. He grew up and spent much of his life in "The Towers" on North West Front Street in Milford. Later in his life he moved to Baltimore, Maryland where he associated with Edgar Allan Poe.

== Family background ==
Lofland was born in Milford, Delaware on March 17, 1798. His father, Isaac, had moved to Milford from Frederica to start a general merchandise business. Isaac had married twice, but, tragically, both his wives had died. His third marriage was to Cynthia Virden, the daughter of a prominent local figure in Brown's Branch, five miles north of Milford. The marriage is speculated to have been an arranged one, a tactic of Cynthia's father to forge a strong relationship with Isaac, who held great sway in the local community. Cynthia's father wanted Issac's support to get appointed as the Milford schoolmaster.

Lofland was Isaac and Cynthia's first child. He had a brother but he died aged three. The Loflands had another child, a daughter, Sarah, in 1802. Lofland formed a close and affectionate relationship with Sarah that lasted throughout their lives. Lofland's father died in 1803, bequeathing his widow and children a significant fortune. Cynthia later married a Laurel, a druggist who went on to run a general merchandise business.

== Education ==
Lofland wasn't the brightest child at school. His mother had to teach him at home. It took Lofland longer than usual to learn how to read. After that his learning abilities improved significantly. He developed a love for reading and became a voracious reader. The first books he read were mostly English literature. Books written by American writers were rare and there were none for children. After turning twelve Lofland began reading science, theology, metaphysics, history, and mythology.

As he reached his teens, Lofland gained access to a local scholar's library. He began reading Voltaire, d'Alembert, Maupertuis, Rousseau, Condorcet, Volney, Hume, and Gibbon. Lofland later described this phase in his life as reading and awakening as a skeptic. The skepticism spilled into his family life and caused problems. Being deeply religious, his family found it hard to cope with his philosophical awakening. Giving in to his mother's constant demands, he finally read the Bible, finding in it truth and beauty. Nevertheless, he did not consider himself capable of following Christianity.
