= Index of Delaware-related articles =

List of articles related to the Delaware, USA

The location of the state of Delaware in the United States of America

The following is an alphabetical list of articles related to the U.S. state of Delaware.

== 0–9 ==
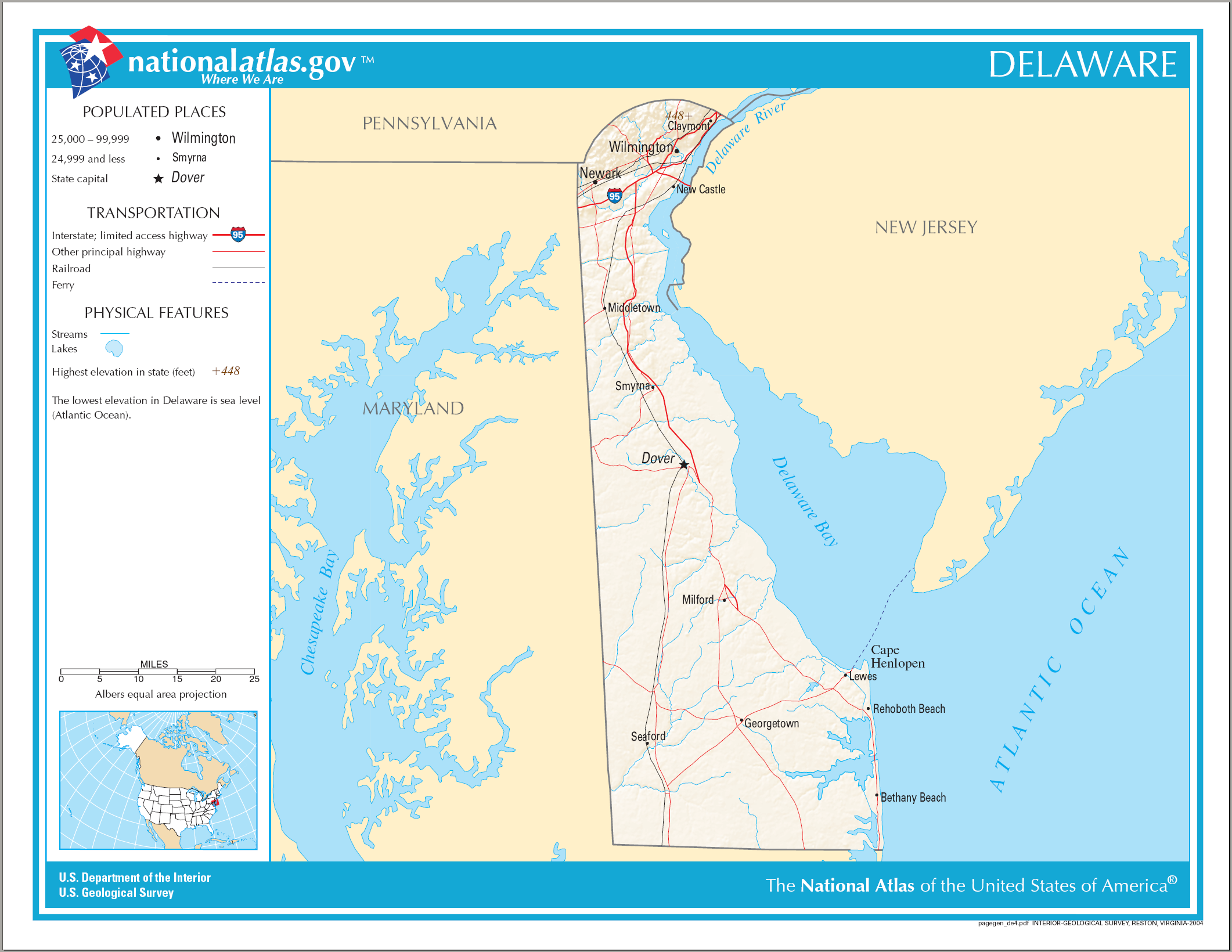
An enlargeable map of the state of Delaware

- .de.us – Internet second-level domain for the state of Delaware
- 1st state to ratify the Constitution of the United States of America
- 2020 coronavirus pandemic in Delaware

== A ==
- Abortion in Delaware
- Adjacent states:
  - Commonwealth of Pennsylvania
  - State of Maryland
  - State of New Jersey
- Agriculture in Delaware
- Airports in Delaware
- Archaeology in Delaware
- Architecture in Delaware
- Area codes in Delaware
- Art museums and galleries in Delaware
  - commons:Category:Art museums and galleries in Delaware
- Astronomical observatories in Delaware
  - commons:Category:Astronomical observatories in Delaware
- Attorney General of the State of Delaware

== B ==
- Botanical gardens in Delaware
  - commons:Category:Botanical gardens in Delaware
- Buildings and structures in Delaware
  - commons:Category:Buildings and structures in Delaware

== C ==
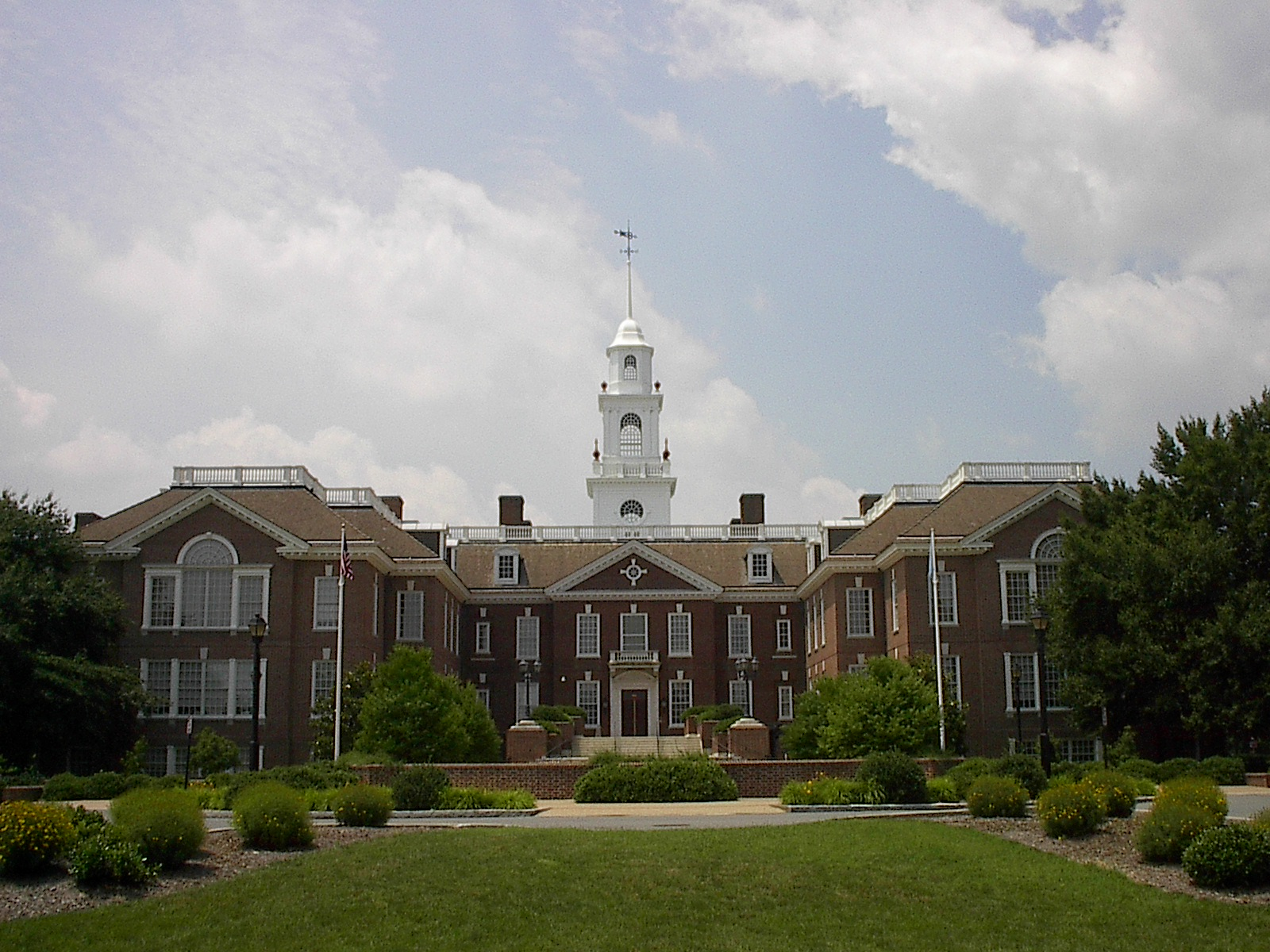
The Delaware State Capitol in Dover

- Caesar Rodney Institute
- Capital of the State of Delaware
- Capitol of the State of Delaware
  - commons:Category:Delaware State Capitol
- Casinos in Delaware
- Census statistical areas of Delaware
- Cities in Delaware
  - commons:Category:Cities in Delaware
- Delaware Wing Civil Air Patrol
- Climate of Delaware
- Climate change in Delaware
- Colony of Delaware – see Lower Counties on the Delaware River
- Colony of New-York, (1664–1673), (1674–1681)-1688, and 1689–1776
- Colony of Pennsylvania, 1681–1776
- Colleges and universities in Delaware
  - commons:Category:Universities and colleges in Delaware
- Committee of 100 (Delaware)
- Communications in Delaware
  - commons:Category:Communications in Delaware

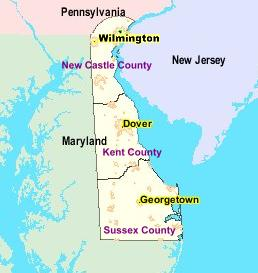
An enlargeable map of the 3 counties of the state of Delaware

- Companies in Delaware
  - Category:Companies based in Delaware
- Congressional districts of Delaware
- Corporations incorporated in Delaware
- Constitution of the State of Delaware
- Counties of the State of Delaware
  - commons:Category:Counties in Delaware
    - New Castle County, Delaware
    - Kent County, Delaware
    - Sussex County, Delaware
- Culture of Delaware
  - commons:Category:Delaware culture

== D ==
- DE – United States Postal Service postal code for the state of Delaware
- Delaware website
  - Category:Delaware
    - commons:Category:Delaware
      - commons:Category:Maps of Delaware
- Delaware Academy of Medicine
- Delaware Colony
- Delaware corporation
- Delaware County in six states
- The Delaware Journal of Corporate Law
- Delaware Depository
- Delaware General Assembly Delegations from New Castle County
- Delaware Intercorp
- Delaware River
- Delaware State Police
- Delaware Student Testing Program
- Delaware Township in seven states
- Delaware Volunteer Firemen's Association
- Demographics of Delaware
- Dover, Delaware, state capital since 1777

== E ==
- Economy of Delaware
  - Category:Economy of Delaware
    - commons:Category:Economy of Delaware
- Education in Delaware
  - Category:Education in Delaware
    - commons:Category:Education in Delaware
- Elections in the state of Delaware
  - Category:Elections in Delaware
    - commons:Category:Elections in Delaware
- Environment of Delaware
  - commons:Category:Environment of Delaware

== F ==
The flag of the state of Delaware

- Fenwick Island
- Festivals in Delaware
  - commons:Category:Festivals in Delaware
- First State
- Fishing in Delaware
- Flag of the state of Delaware
- Forts in Delaware
  - Fort Casimir
  - Fort Christina, capital of Swedish colony of Nya Sverige 1638-1655
  - Fort Delaware
  - Fort du Pont
  - Fort Miles
  - Category:Forts in Delaware
    - commons:Category:Forts in Delaware

== G ==
The Great Seal of the State of Delaware

- Geography of Delaware
  - Category:Geography of Delaware
    - commons:Category:Geography of Delaware
- Geology of Delaware
  - Category:Geology of Delaware
    - commons:Category:Geology of Delaware
  - commons:Category:Geography of Delaware
- Ghost towns in Delaware
  - Category:Ghost towns in Delaware
    - commons:Category:Ghost towns in Delaware
- Golf clubs and courses in Delaware
- Government of the State of Delaware website
  - Category:Government of Delaware
    - commons:Category:Government of Delaware
- Governor of the State of Delaware
  - List of governors of Delaware
- Great Seal of the State of Delaware

== H ==
- Heritage railroads in Delaware
  - commons:Category:Heritage railroads in Delaware
- High schools of Delaware
- Higher education in Delaware
- Highway routes in Delaware
- Hiking trails in Delaware
  - commons:Category:Hiking trails in Delaware
- History of Delaware
  - Historical outline of Delaware
    - Category:History of Delaware
      - commons:Category:History of Delaware
- Hospitals in Delaware
- House of Representatives of the State of Delaware

== I ==
- Images of Delaware
  - commons:Category:Delaware
- Islam in Delaware
- Islands of Delaware

== K ==
- Kalmar Nyckel

== L ==
- Landmarks in Delaware
  - commons:Category:Landmarks in Delaware
- Languages of Delaware
- Lieutenant Governor of the State of Delaware
- Lists related to the state of Delaware:
  - List of airports in Delaware
  - List of census statistical areas in Delaware
  - List of cities in Delaware
  - List of colleges and universities in Delaware
  - List of companies in Delaware
  - List of United States congressional districts in Delaware
  - List of counties in Delaware
  - List of Delaware Hundreds
  - List of forts in Delaware
  - List of ghost towns in Delaware
  - List of governors of Delaware
  - List of high schools in Delaware
  - List of highway routes in Delaware
  - List of hospitals in Delaware
  - List of individuals executed in Delaware
  - List of islands of Delaware
  - List of law enforcement agencies in Delaware
  - List of lieutenant governors of Delaware
  - List of municipalities of Delaware
  - List of museums in Delaware
  - List of National Historic Landmarks in Delaware
  - List of newspapers in Delaware
  - List of people from Delaware
  - List of places in Delaware
  - List of radio stations in Delaware
  - List of railroads in Delaware
  - List of Registered Historic Places in Delaware
  - List of rivers of Delaware
  - List of school districts in Delaware
  - List of state forests in Delaware
  - List of state parks in Delaware
  - List of state prisons in Delaware
  - List of state symbols of Delaware
  - List of telephone area codes in Delaware
  - List of television stations in Delaware
  - List of Delaware's congressional delegations
  - List of United States congressional district of Delaware
  - List of United States representatives from Delaware
  - List of United States senators from Delaware
- Lower Counties on the Delaware River, 1704–1776

== M ==
- Maps of Delaware
  - commons:Category:Maps of Delaware
- Middle Run Valley Natural Area
- Museums in Delaware
  - Category:Museums in Delaware
    - commons:Category:Museums in Delaware
- Music of Delaware
  - Category:Music of Delaware
    - commons:Category:Music of Delaware
  - Category:Musical groups from Delaware
  - Category:Musicians from Delaware

== N ==
- Natural history of Delaware
  - commons:Category:Natural history of Delaware
- News media in Delaware
- New-Castle, capital of the Lower Counties on the Delaware 1704–1776, first state capital 1776-1777
- Newspapers of Delaware
- Nieuw-Nederland, 1614–(1655–1664) and (1673–1674)
- Notable people from Delaware
- Nya Sverige, 1638–1655

== P ==
- People from Delaware
  - Category:People from Delaware
    - commons:Category:People from Delaware
    - Category:People from Delaware by populated place
    - Category:People from Delaware by county
    - Category:People from Delaware by occupation
- Philadelphia metropolitan area
- Places in Delaware
- Politics of Delaware
  - Category:Politics of Delaware
    - commons:Category:Politics of Delaware
- Populated places in Delaware
  - Cities in Delaware
  - Towns in Delaware
  - Villages in Delaware
  - Census Designated Places in Delaware
  - Other unincorporated communities in Delaware
  - List of ghost towns in Delaware
  - List of places in Delaware
- Protected areas of Delaware
  - commons:Category:Protected areas of Delaware

== R ==
- Radio stations in Delaware
- Railroads in Delaware
- Registered historic places in Delaware
  - commons:Category:Registered Historic Places in Delaware
- Religion in Delaware
  - Category:Religion in Delaware
- Rivers of Delaware
  - commons:Category:Rivers of Delaware

== S ==
- School districts of Delaware
- Scouting in Delaware
- Senate of the State of Delaware
- Sports in Delaware
  - Category:Sports in Delaware
    - commons:Category:Sports in Delaware
  - Category:Sports venues in Delaware
    - commons:Category:Sports venues in Delaware
- State Capitol of Delaware
- State of Delaware website
  - Constitution of the State of Delaware
  - Government of the State of Delaware
    - Category:Government of Delaware
      - commons:Category:Government of Delaware
  - Executive branch of the government of the State of Delaware
    - Governor of the State of Delaware
  - Legislative branch of the government of the State of Delaware
    - Legislature of the State of Delaware
      - Senate of the State of Delaware
      - House of Representatives of the State of Delaware
  - Judicial branch of the government of the State of Delaware
    - Supreme Court of the State of Delaware
- State parks of Delaware
  - commons:Category:State parks of Delaware
- State Police of Delaware
- State prisons of Delaware
- Structures in Delaware
- Supreme Court of the State of Delaware
- Symbols of the State of Delaware
  - Category:Symbols of Delaware
    - commons:Category:Symbols of Delaware

== T ==
- Telecommunications in Delaware
  - commons:Category:Communications in Delaware
- Telephone area codes in Delaware
- Television stations in Delaware
- Tourism in Delaware website
  - commons:Category:Tourism in Delaware
- Transportation in Delaware
  - Category:Transportation in Delaware
    - commons:Category:Transport in Delaware

== U ==
- United States of America
  - States of the United States of America
  - United States census statistical areas of Delaware
  - Delaware's congressional delegations
  - United States congressional district of Delaware
  - United States Court of Appeals for the Third Circuit
  - United States District Court for the District of Delaware
  - United States representatives from Delaware
  - United States senators from Delaware
- Universities and colleges in Delaware
  - commons:Category:Universities and colleges in Delaware
- US-DE – ISO 3166-2:US region code for the State of Delaware

== W ==
- White Clay Creek State Park
  Wikimedia
  - Wikimedia Commons:Category:Delaware
    - commons:Category:Maps of Delaware
  - Wikinews:Category:Delaware
    - Wikinews:Portal:Delaware
  - Wikipedia Category:Delaware
    - Wikipedia:WikiProject Delaware
      - Category:WikiProject Delaware articles
      - Category:WikiProject Delaware participants
- Wilmington, Delaware
- Winterthur Museum

== See also ==
- Topic overview:
  - Delaware
  - Outline of Delaware
