= List of Delaware companies =

Location of Delaware

Delaware is a state in the Northeastern United States. Delaware's economy shifted to a manufacturing base in the late 19th century, led by the transformation of the DuPont Company. Modern growth in the financial workforce has overtaken the manufacturing sector in the state's economy. The Delaware General Corporation Law provides a flexible and stable framework for national incorporation. While they are seldom headquartered in the state, the management-friendly and mature legal system attracts many corporations; over 66% of the Fortune 500 are incorporated in Delaware.

== Largest firms ==
This list shows firms in the Fortune 500, which ranks firms by total revenues reported before January 31, 2018. Only the top five firms (if available) are included as a sample.

Rank	Name	Revenues (USD $M)	Employees	Notes
451	Chemours	6,183	7,000	Wilmington-based commodity chemical manufacturer, spun off from DuPont in 2015. The firm produces Titanium dioxide, Fluoropolymers, and other reactive chemicals.
515	Navient	5,179	6,700	Financial services corporation providing asset management and financial administration support, specifically in the student loan sector.

== Notable firms ==
This list includes notable companies with primary headquarters located in the state. The industry and sector follow the Industry Classification Benchmark taxonomy. Organizations which have ceased operations are included and noted as defunct.

Notable companies Status: P=Private, S=State; A=Active, D=Defunct
Name	Industry	Sector	Headquarters	Founded	Notes	Status	
21st Century Insurance	Financials	Property & casualty insurance	Wilmington	1958	Auto insurance, part of Farmers Insurance Group	P	A
Aurora Bank	Financials	Banks	Wilmington	1921	Bank	P	D
Bank of Wilmington and Brandywine	Financials	Banks	Wilmington	1810	Bank	P	D
Chemours	Basic materials	Commodity chemicals	Wilmington	2015	Chemicals, spun off from DuPont	P	A
Delaware Intercorp	Industrials	Business support services	Newark	1996	Registry services	P	A
Del-One Federal Credit Union	Financials	Banks	Dover	1960	Credit union	P	A
Dogfish Head Brewery	Consumer goods	Brewers	Milton	1995	Brewery	P	A
DuPont	Basic materials	Commodity chemicals	Wilmington	1802	Chemical conglomerate	P	A
Du Pont Motors	Consumer goods	Automobiles	Wilmington	1919	Automobile manufacturer, defunct 1931	P	D
EDiS Company	Industrials	Heavy construction	Wilmington	1908	Construction management	P	A
Fordham & Dominion Brewing Company	Consumer goods	Brewers	Dover	2007	Brewery	P	A
Grant & Eisenhofer	Industrials	Business support services	Wilmington	1997	Law firm	P	A
Happy Harry's	Consumer services	Broadline retailers	Wilmington	1962	Drugstores, merged into Walgreens	P	D
Harlan and Hollingsworth	Industrials	Commercial vehicles & trucks	Wilmington	1837	Ships and rail, defunct 1904	P	D
Hercules Inc.	Basic materials	Commodity chemicals	Wilmington	1912	Gunpowder	P	D
House Industries	Industrials	Business support services	Yorklyn	1990	Design studio	P	A
ILC Dover	Industrials	Aerospace	Frederica	1932	Aerospace engineering	P	A
Incyte	Health care	Pharmaceuticals	Wilmington	1991	Pharmaceuticals	P	A
Iron Hill Brewery & Restaurant	Consumer goods	Brewers	Newark	1996	Brewery	P	A
Jackson and Sharp Company	Industrials	Commercial vehicles & trucks	Wilmington	1863	Ships and rail	P	D
Jade Tree	Consumer services	Broadcasting & entertainment	Wilmington	1990	Record label	P	A
Nassau Valley Vineyards	Consumer goods	Distillers & vintners	Lewes	1993	Winery	P	A
National Bank of Delaware	Financials	Banks	Wilmington	1795	Bank, defunct 1929	P	D
National Vulcanized Fiber	Industrials	Building materials & fixtures	Yorklyn	1923	Material manufacturing	P	D
Navient	Financials	Consumer finance	Wilmington	2014	Student loan services	P	A
P&L Transportation	Industrials	Railroads	Wilmington	1995	Railway holdings	P	A
Pusey and Jones	Industrials	Commercial vehicles & trucks	Wilmington	1848	Shipbuilder, defunct 1959	P	D
Sallie Mae	Financials	Banks	Newark	1972	Offers private student loans.	P	A
TMI Group of Companies	Industrials	Industrial machinery	New Castle	1931	Testing equipment	P	A
Tritek	Technology	Software	Wilmington	1984	Mailing software	P	A
Twin Lakes Brewing Company	Consumer goods	Brewers	Newport	2006	Brewery	P	A
Union Bank of Delaware	Financials	Banks	Wilmington	1839	Bank, acquired by Wilmington Trust in 1943	P	D
Victorine & Samuel Homsey	Industrials	Business support services	Wilmington	1935	Architects, defunct 1979	P	D
W. L. Gore & Associates	Basic materials	Commodity chemicals	Newark	1958	Fluoropolymers	P	A
Wilmington Trust	Financials	Asset managers	Wilmington	1903	Financial services	P	A
Wingspan Bank	Financials	Banks	Wilmington	1999	Online bank, defunct 2001	P	D
WSFS Bank	Financials	Banks	Wilmington	1832	Bank and financial services	P	A
Young Conaway Stargatt & Taylor	Industrials	Business support services	Wilmington	1959	Law firm	P	A

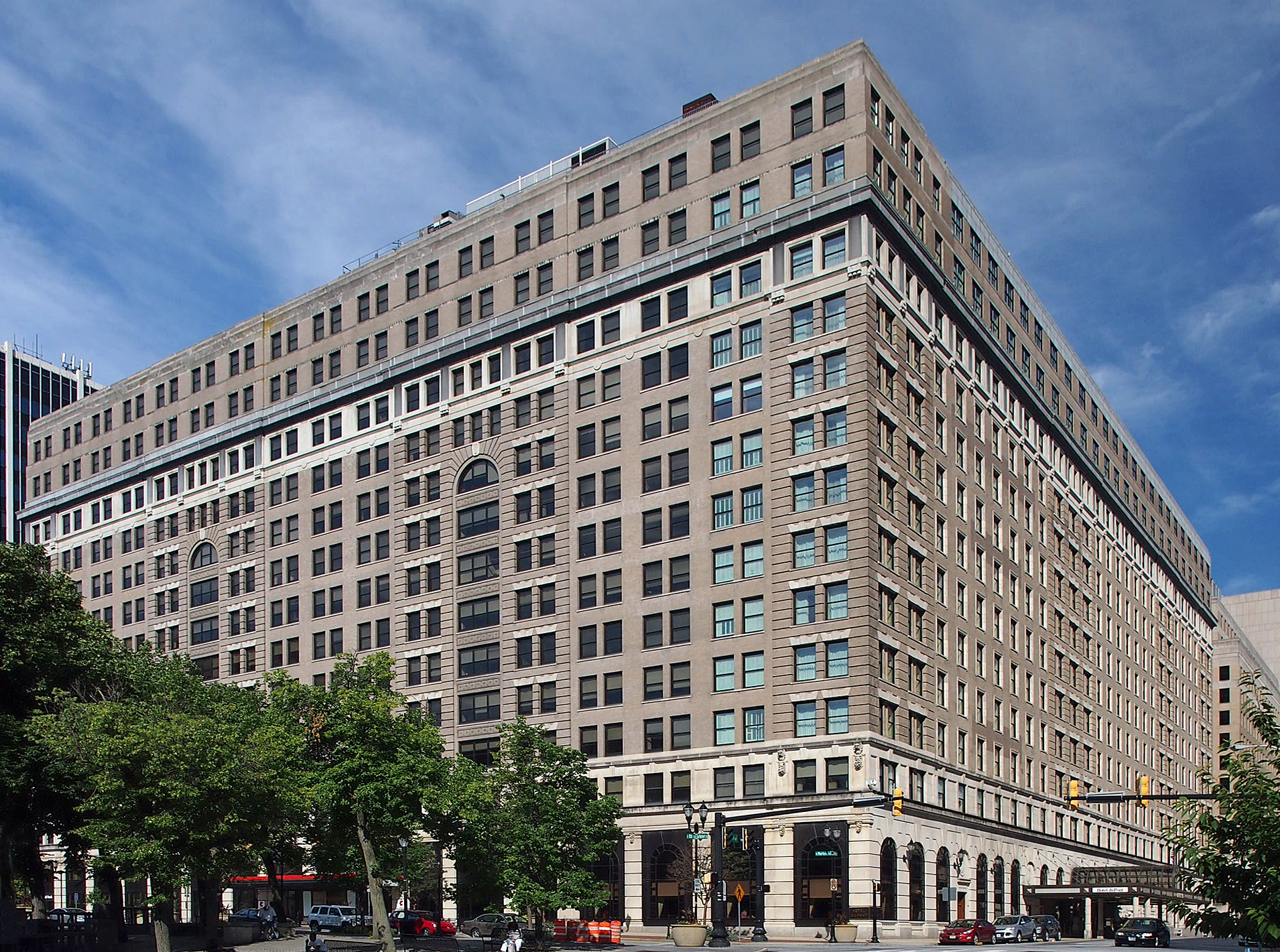
DuPont Building on Rodney Square

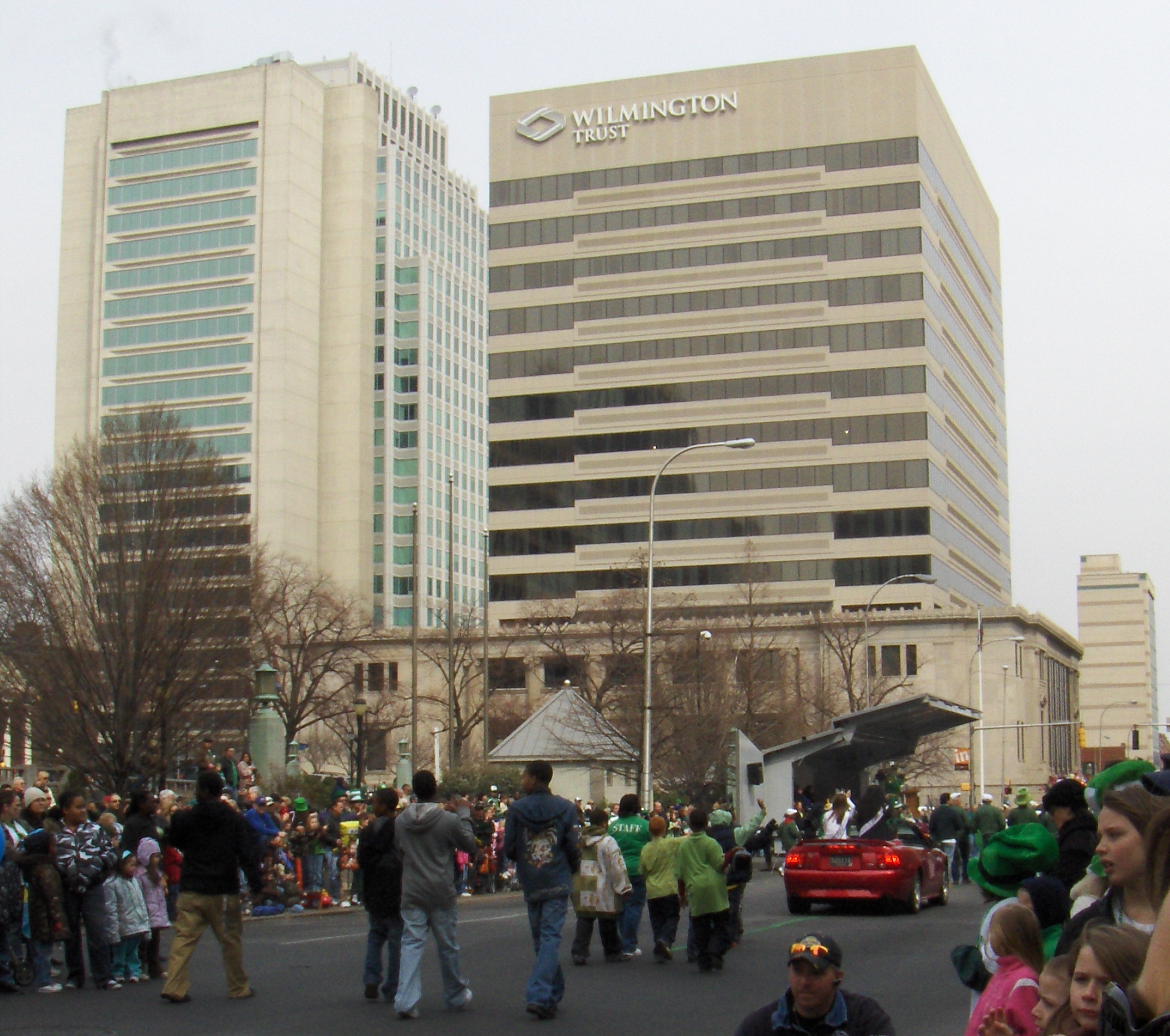
Wilmington Trust headquarters in Wilmington

== See also ==
- Corporate haven
- List of companies of the United States by state
