= Delaware (disambiguation) =

Delaware is a U.S. state.

Delaware may also refer to:

== People ==
- Delaware people, the Native American tribe also known as the Lenape
  - Delaware Nation, a Native American tribe in Oklahoma
  - Delaware language, the Algonquian language of the Delaware tribe

== Places ==
=== United States ===
- Delaware Colony, English colony (1664–1707) then British colony (1707–76) preceding statehood
- Delaware River, a major river in the eastern United States
- Delaware River (Kansas)
- Delaware Bay, tidal inlet which separates New Jersey from the state of Delaware; fed by the Delaware River
- Delaware Lake (New York), a lake north of Long Eddy in Delaware County, New York
- Delaware Lake (Ohio), a reservoir on the Olentangy River in Delaware County, Ohio
- Delaware Basin, a geologic depositional and structural basin in West Texas and southern New Mexico
- Delaware Water Gap, Pennsylvania
- Delaware Falls, one of 24 named waterfalls in Ricketts Glen State Park in Pennsylvania

==== Cities and towns ====
- Delaware City, Delaware
- Delaware, Indiana
- Delaware, Iowa
- Delaware, Michigan
- Delaware, Missouri
- Delaware, New York
- Delaware, Ohio
- Delaware, Oklahoma
- West Point, Virginia, formerly known as Delaware

=== Canada ===
- Delaware, Ontario

== Ships ==
- USS Delaware, the name of various United States Navy ships
- NOAAS Delaware II (R 445), a United States National Oceanic and Atmospheric Administration fisheries research ship in service since 1968
- Delaware (fireboat), in service in Philadelphia (1950-), see Fireboats of Philadelphia

== Music ==
- Delaware (band)
- Delaware (album) first album by Drop Nineteens
- "Delaware" (song) a popular song from 1959 with puns on the names of the American states

== Other ==
- Delaware (chicken), breed of chicken from the state
- Blue Hen of Delaware, other breed of chicken from the state
- Delaware General Corporation Law
- Delaware (grape)
- Delaware St. John, an adventure game series
- Delaware Plan, a proposed system to reorganize the state's presidential elections
- University of Delaware, a private university

== See also ==
- Thomas West, 3rd Baron De La Warr, namesake of Delaware
- Delaware County (disambiguation)
- Delaware Township (disambiguation)
