= EDiS Company =

EDiS
- Industry: Construction management General contracting Design build
- Founded: 1908
- Founder: Ernesto DiSabatino
- Headquarters: Wilmington, Delaware, U.S.
- Key people: Brian DiSabatino (CEO); Andrew DiSabatino III (EVP); Adam DiSabatino (VP)
- Services: Construction management
- Number of employees: 72 (2012)
- Divisions: EDiS Company; EDiS Building System (EBS); Asset Management Alliance (AMA); Advanced Modeling Precision (AMP); EDiS' General Building Services (EGBS)
- Website: www.ediscompany.com

EDiS is a construction management firm with offices in Wilmington, Delaware and West Chester, Pennsylvania. It has five divisions: EDiS Company, EDiS Building System (EBS), Asset Management Alliance (AMA), Advanced Modeling Precision (AMP), EDiS' General Building Services (EGBS). Originally formed in 1908, as a stonemason contractor, EDiS is considered one of the first construction management firms in Delaware.

== History ==
As master stonemasons, Ernesto DiSabatino and his sons stayed busy with tunnel projects in the Abruzzo region of Italy. In 1905, Ernesto and his eldest two sons, Arthur and Clarence were constructing the Simplon Tunnel in the Alps along the Switzerland border.

After failing his army physical because of a misdiagnosis of tuberculosis, Arthur along with brother Clarence encouraged their father Ernesto to emigrate to America as new opportunities for a better life were available. With initial hesitation, Ernesto agreed that immigration to America was best for the family. The family had a sponsor in Little Italy, Wilmington, Luigi Pedicone, and when the DiSabatino family arrived in 1906 they immediately picked up work as stonemasons. At that time bricklayers earned $3 for 1,000 bricks laid. Ernesto and sons Arthur and Clarence worked 12 hours a day, six days a week as master stonemasons. By January 1907, the remaining family emigrated to Wilmington, Delaware, including wife Angela Dea and the remaining DiSabatino children.

Ernesto settled quickly and within 15 months of his arrival established Ernest DiSabatino and Sons in 1908. Originally started as a masonry contracting company-quality construction by skilled tradesmen became the principals for EDiS. In 1917, the company moved to their first office at 415 Lincoln Street and through hard work became a leader in the construction field and the community.

One of the best known projects at this time was St. Anthony of Padua Church, a Little Italy landmark which was completed in 1926. Ernesto DiSabatino later received the Papal Cross of Honor Pro Ecclesia et Pontifice in honor of his work in starting the parish and erecting the church. Around the same time was the completion of St. Francis Hospital in 1925, the hospital was located in Little Italy, the area where Ernesto originally settled.

After the death of Ernesto in 1932 at the age of 67, the business was left in the hands of his four sons, Arthur, Clarence, Dominick and Paul.

== War era ==
With the third generation of the company serving in the war, this time period is considered to be one of the most challenging times in the company's history. Eugene DiSabatino, an engineer, worked on the Manhattan Project that produced the nuclear bomb. During World War II, the company helped major corporations convert their factories for wartime production while also assisting the government with defense and housing projects.

== Post-war era ==
The Baby Boomer generation proved to be a success in the eyes of top management as EDiS was commissioned to build numerous schools for the growing children population in Delaware. Even today, education remains a large market for EDiS. The DuPont family became a customer for EDiS with the construction of the Nemours building and the Edgemoor Plant in the late 1930s. November 14, 1963 marked the dedication for the Delaware Service plaza, a project EDiS managed. On hand for the dedication was President John F. Kennedy; it was his last public statement on a public works project as his assassination was a week later.

== 2000s ==
The developments of the Wilmington Riverfront lead to the construction and renovation of many prominent buildings on the Christina River. Notable projects such as the Riverfront Market, ING Direct and Harry's Seafood Grill are all EDiS star projects. Another notable project completed in 2002 was the New Castle County Courthouse. The company built the $137 million, 572,000 sq. ft., 14-story building over 3 1/2 years, and the courthouse serves as a landmark in the Wilmington skyline. In 2009, EDiS partnered with Peninsula Compost to develop the Wilmington Organic Recycling Center; the first high-volume, consistently viable and logistically feasible opportunity to divert food waste for the purpose of recycling in the Mid Atlantic region.

== Notable clients ==
- Amtrak
- Appoquinimink School District
- Archdiocese of Philadelphia
- AstraZeneca
- Brandywine Realty Trust (REIT)
- Capital School District
- Christiana Care Health System
- City of Wilmington
- Delaware State University
- DuPont
- Fidelity Investments
- Fisker Automotive
- Grant & Eisenhofer P.A.
- HMSHost
- INGDirect
- JPMorgan Chase
- Legg Mason
- PNC Bank
- State of Delaware
- University of Delaware
