= List of colleges and universities in Delaware =

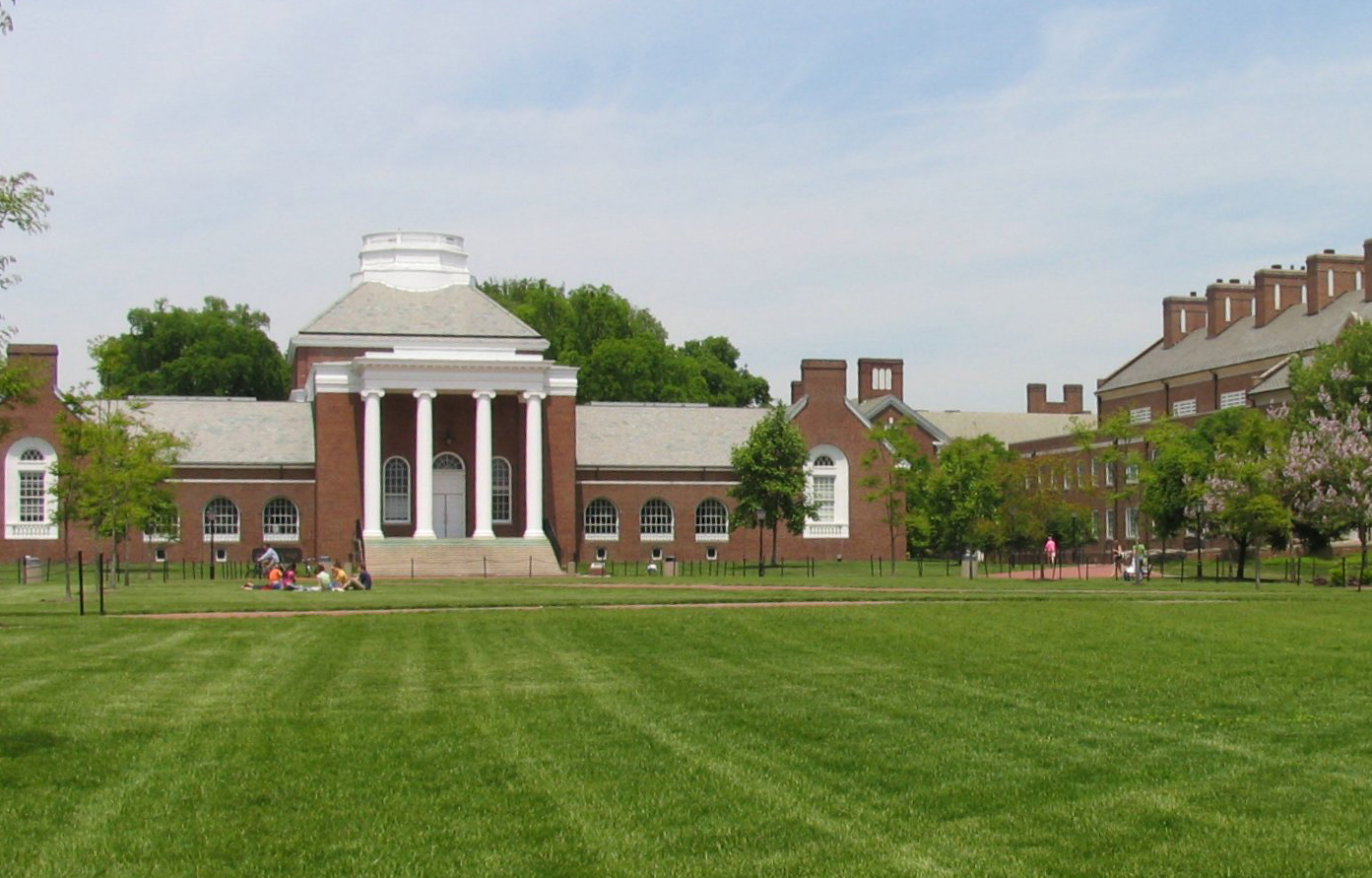
Memorial Hall at the University of Delaware

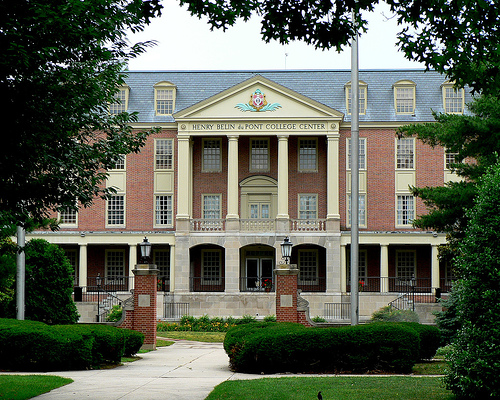
Henry Belin duPont College Center at the former Wesley College

There are seven colleges and universities in Delaware. These institutions include two research universities, two master's university, one associates colleges, and two special-focus institutions. Four of Delaware's post-secondary institutions are private and three are public.

Delaware's oldest post-secondary institution is the University of Delaware, which was chartered by the Delaware General Assembly as a degree-granting college in 1833. (Note: The University of Delaware is a successor institution to the "Free School," which was founded in 1743. The University of Delaware was chartered as Delaware College by the Delaware General Assembly as a degree-granting college in 1833.) The University of Delaware is also the state's largest institution of higher learning in terms of enrollment, with 24,412 students as of 2024. Wilmington University is Delaware's largest private post-secondary institution, with an enrollment of 13,746.

Delaware has two land-grant universities: Delaware State University and the University of Delaware. The University of Delaware is also the state's sole participant in the National Sea Grant College Program and the National Space Grant College and Fellowship Program. In addition, Delaware State University is the one historically black college and university in the state, and is a member of the Thurgood Marshall College Fund. Delaware previously had two private post-secondary institutions for men and women respectively: St. Mary's College and Wesleyan Female College respectively.

The state does not have a medical school, but the Delaware Institute of Medical Education and Research reserves spaces for Delaware students at two medical schools in Philadelphia. Delaware has one law school, Widener University Delaware Law School. All six of Delaware's post-secondary institutions are institutionally accredited by the Middle States Commission on Higher Education.

== Extant institutions ==
Institution	Location(s)	Control	Type (Note: School location, control, and type are based on the Carnegie Classification of Institutions of Higher Education.)	Enrollment (fall 2024)	Founded
Delaware State University	Dover	Public	Master's university	5,327	1891
Delaware Technical Community College	Dover, Georgetown, Stanton, and Wilmington	Public	Associate's college	13,337	1967
Goldey–Beacom College	Pike Creek Valley	Private	Master's university	1,001	1886
Strayer University	Wilmington	Private	Master's university	187	1892
University of Delaware	Newark	Public	Research university	24,412	1833
Widener University Delaware Law School	Wilmington	Private	Law school		1975
Wilmington University	New Castle	Private	Research university	13,746	1968

== Defunct institutions ==
Institution	Location(s)	Control	Founded	Closed	Notes
Brandywine Junior College	Wilmington	Private	1966	1991	Entered into a merger with Widener University in 1976 and graduated its final class in 1991. Campus now serves as Widener University Delaware Law School.
Delaware College of Art and Design	Wilmington	Private	1997	2024	On May 23, 2024, the college announced it would be winding down operations and close permanently.
St. Mary's College	Wilmington	Private	1841	1866	Catholic institution closed in 1866 following the American Civil War.
Wesley College	Dover	Private	1873	2021	Acquired by Delaware State University in 2021.
Wesleyan Female College	Wilmington	Private	1837	1885	Methodist institution for women. Following its closing, no college for women existed in Delaware until the Women's College of Delaware opened in 1914.
Women's College of Delaware	Newark	Public	1914	1945	Merged into the University of Delaware in 1945.

== See also ==
- List of college athletic programs in Delaware
- Higher education in the United States
- List of recognized higher education accreditation organizations
- Lists of American institutions of higher education
