= Wesleyan Female College =

Wesleyan Female College may refer to:

- Cincinnati Wesleyan Female Seminary, Ohio
- Ohio Wesleyan Female College, Delaware, Ohio
- Wesleyan College, Macon, Georgia
- Wesleyan Female College (Wilmington), Delaware
