= Josephine White deLacour =

American physician and suffragist

- Born: Josephine Margaret Rebecca White; October 4, 1849; Lancaster County, Pennsylvania, US
- Died: March 16, 1929 (aged 79); Wilmington, Delaware, US
- Resting place: Old Swedes Cemetery, Wilmington
- Education: Wesleyan Female College (Wilmington); Woman's Medical College of Pennsylvania (M.D.)
- Spouse: Edward deLacour (m. 1900; died 1928)
- Scientific career
- Fields: Medicine

Josephine M. R. White deLacour (October 4, 1849 – March 16, 1929) was an American physician and suffragist and one of the first woman physicians in Delaware.

== Early life ==
Josephine Margaret Rebecca White was born on October 4, 1849, to Mary (née Beyer) and Alexander White at Beyerbrook Farm in Lancaster County, Pennsylvania. Her family moved to Wilmington, Delaware in the 1850s. She graduated from Wesleyan Female College in Wilmington in 1875 and received her medical degree from the Women's Medical College of Pennsylvania in 1878.

== Career ==
She began her practice in Wilmington, Delaware in 1879 and in 1880 became the first woman elected a member of the Delaware Medical Society. She was also active in the women's suffrage movement, serving as president of the Wilmington Equal Suffrage Association from 1914 to 1916. She was one of the founders of the Physicians' and Surgeons' Hospital (later Wilmington General Hospital).

In June 1895, she ran for Wilmington's Board of Education, but was defeated.

Josephine White deLacour practiced medicine in Wilmington for 50 years, until her death.

== Personal life ==
In 1900, she married Edward deLacour (1855–1928), a judge of the Appeal Tax Court of Baltimore. They lived at 706 West Street in Wilmington, Delaware, where she also had her office.

== Death ==
She died on March 16, 1929, from angina at her home in Wilmington. She is buried at the Old Swedes Cemetery in Wilmington.
