= Beulah Woolston =

American missionary teacher (1828–1886)

- Born: August 3, 1828; Vincentown, New Jersey, U.S.
- Died: October 24, 1886 (aged 58); Mount Holly, New Jersey, U.S.
- Education: Wesleyan Female College, Wilmington, Delaware
- Occupations: Missionary teacher; school founder; textbook translator; Chinese-language newspaper editor
- Employers: Ladies' China Missionary Society of Baltimore; Woman's Foreign Missionary Society of the Methodist Episcopal Church
- Known for: Educational work in Fuzhou, China
- Notable work: "Feet Binding" (1877)
- Relatives: Sarah Hayes Woolston (sister)

Beulah Woolston (1828–1886) was a pioneering American missionary teacher in China. She was born in New Jersey and, together with her sister Sarah Hayes Woolston, dedicated more than two decades to educational work in Fuzhou, China. Through their affiliation with the Ladies' China Society, the sisters founded and supervised a boarding school for girls, established teacher training programs, and opened additional day schools in the region. They were also active in literary work, preparing and translating textbooks and editing a Chinese-language children's newspaper. Over the course of their careers, they helped train many Chinese women and girls, and became the first missionaries sent out by the Woman's Foreign Missionary Society of the Methodist Episcopal Church. Woolston returned to the U.S. for health reasons in the 1880s and died there in 1886.

== Early life and education ==
Beulah Woolston was born near Vincentown, New Jersey, on August 3, 1828. She was raised in a Christian home, and was converted and united with the church when about fifteen years old. After receiving preliminary education in Vincentown, she went with Miss Sarah H. Woolston, her sister and her life associate in home and work, to the Wesleyan Female College, at Wilmington, Delaware, where she was graduated with honor from both English and classical departments.

== Career ==
She afterward taught for some years in the college, before responding to the call for missionary teachers in the China Mission. The sisters sailed for China, along with Phebe Potter (who soon married Erastus Wentworth), October 4, 1858. After a voyage of 147 days around the Cape of Good Hope, they landed at Shanghai, February 27, 1859, and reached Fuzhou, March 19. Their special work was to organize and superintend a boarding school for Chinese girls under the auspices of the China Female Missionary Society of Baltimore. The sisters were sent out by the parent board, American Methodist Episcopal Mission, but their school was supported by the Ladies' China Missionary Society of Baltimore (founded in 1848).

In 1859, they founded a training school for teachers in Fuzhou. Known as "Uk Ing", it was a girls' boarding school. They overcome the natural prejudices of the people, emphasized by the wrongs done them by foreign traders, and the lack of books, maps, charts for a well-established school. When Bishop John Burdon, of the Church of England, visited the school, he declared it to be the best-conducted girls' school in China.

The sisters' aim was to teach the girls such instruction as would make them useful in their own homes and in the spheres they must occupy in life, feeling that they could not conscientiously give time to teach anything that could be of no possible use to them in the future. In addition to the care of this school, hundreds of women visited them at their home. Every effort was made to utilize their visits for teaching. In addition to caring for the schools, the sisters provided many of the girls with clothing, teaching them to make their own, to cook, wash, and other details for the education of good housewives.

Even vacation days were busy, as they had to provide homes for many of the girls during the time. They also established a number of day schools at different and often distant points in their work, which they visited regularly, and often at great inconvenience and exposure to themselves. With all of this work, they found time for literary work such as preparation and translation of schoolbooks, as well as the editing of the Child's Illustrated Paper in Chinese.

During their twenty-five years' service they returned to the United States twice for rest and to recruit.

In 1871, when the Ladies' China Society became a part of the Woman's Foreign Missionary Society of the Methodist Episcopal Church, the Woolston sisters were its first missionaries.

In 1873, the sisters were affiliated with the Baltimore Female Academy.

== Later life ==
In December, 1883, both sisters were ill, and returned to the U.S. for the last time. At times, Beulah seemed to improve. On October 24, 1886, she grew much worse, and died, at Mount Holly, New Jersey.

== Awards and honors ==
The first instance of conferring Honorary Degrees by Wesleyan Female College, occurred on June 29, 1870, when the degree of Magistrix Artium was bestowed upon Annie Ryder Gracey (missionary teacher, India), Beulah Woolston (missionary teacher, Waugh Mission Seminary in China), and Sarah Hayes Woolston (missionary teacher, Waugh Mission Seminary in China), former graduates of Wesleyan Female College.

== Selected works ==
- "Chinese Gods", Heathen Woman's Friend, 1875
- "Feet Binding", 1877
