= Climate change in Delaware =

Climate change in the US state of Delaware

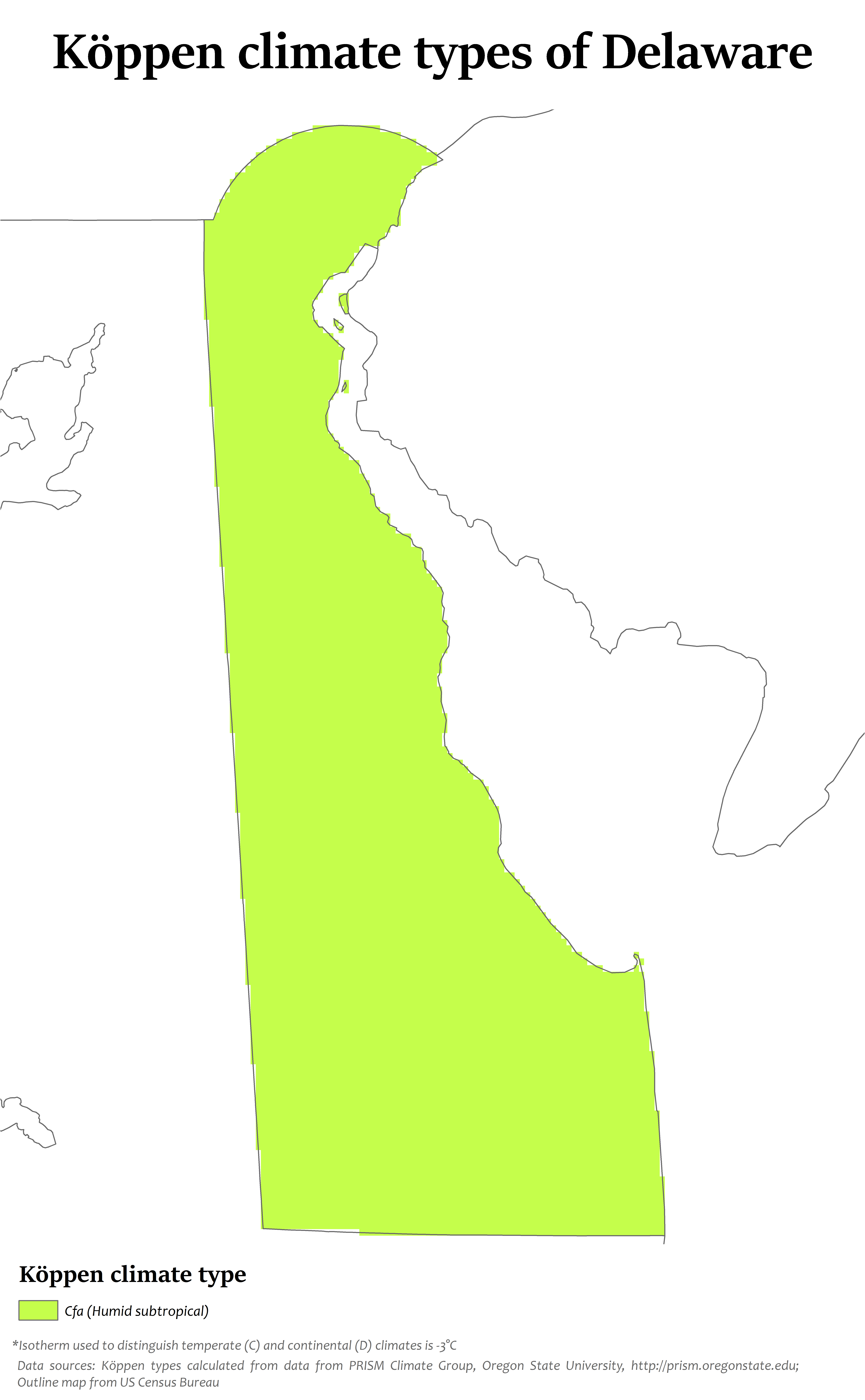
Köppen climate types in Delaware showing that the state is now entirely humid subtropical.

Climate change in Delaware encompasses the effects of climate change, attributed to man-made increases in atmospheric carbon dioxide, in the U.S. state of Delaware.

According to the United States Environmental Protection Agency (EPA), "Delaware's climate is changing. The state has warmed two degrees (F) in the last century, heavy rainstorms are more frequent, and the sea is rising about one inch every seven years. Higher water levels are eroding beaches, submerging low lands, exacerbating coastal flooding, and increasing the salinity of estuaries and aquifers. In the coming decades, changing the climate is likely to increase coastal flooding; harm marine, wetland, and inland ecosystems; disrupt farming; and increase some risks to human health".

== Environmental impacts ==
=== Rising seas and retreating shores ===
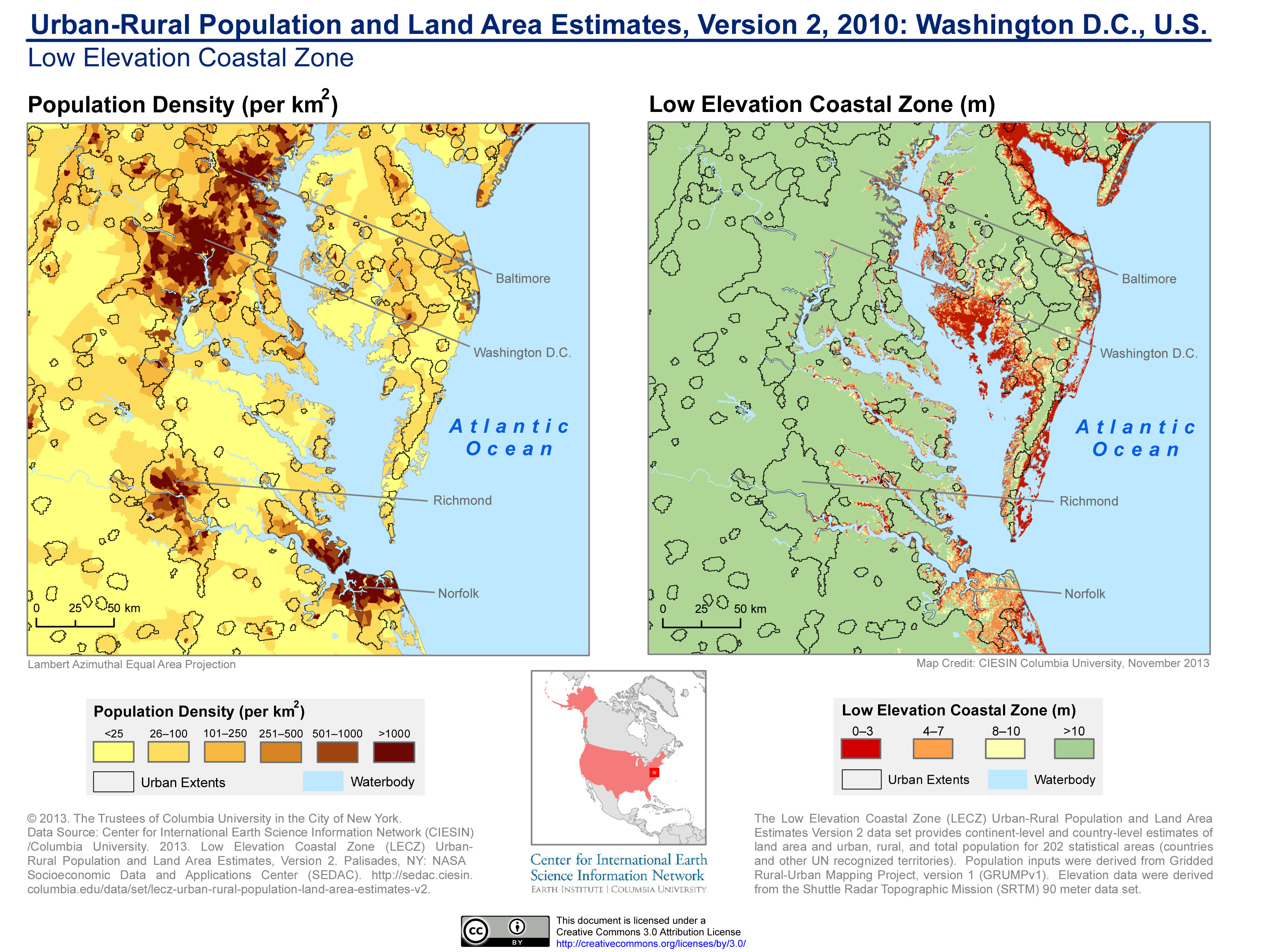
Population density and elevation above sea level in Delaware.

According to the EPA, "sea level is rising more rapidly along the Delaware coast than in most coastal areas because Delaware is sinking. If the oceans and atmosphere continue to warm, sea level is likely to rise between sixteen inches and four feet along the Delaware coast in the next century. As sea level rises, the lowest dry lands are submerged and become either tidal wetland or open water. Wetlands can createtheir own land and keep pace with a slowly rising sea. But if sea level rises three feet or more in the next century, most existing tidal wetlands in Delaware are unlikely to keep pace but will instead become tidal mud flats or shallow open water. Existing tidal flats will generally convert to open water as they are submerged".

The EPA further reports that "beaches also erode as sea level rises. A higher ocean level makes it more likely that storm waters will wash over a barrier island or open new inlets. The United States Geological Survey estimates that Fenwick Island could be broken up by new inlets or lost to erosion if sea level rises three feet by the year 2100, unless people take measures to reduce erosion. Estuarine beaches may also be eliminated in some areas. Many of Delaware Bay's beaches are narrow, with wetlands immediately inland. Along parts of Delaware Bay and the Delaware River, people have built walls or other shore protection structures that eliminate the beach once the shore erodes up to them". However, despite the state spending millions of dollars on beach restoration, experts project that shoreline erosion "will only intensify as sea levels rise from global warming".

=== Increasing temperature and changing precipitation patterns ===
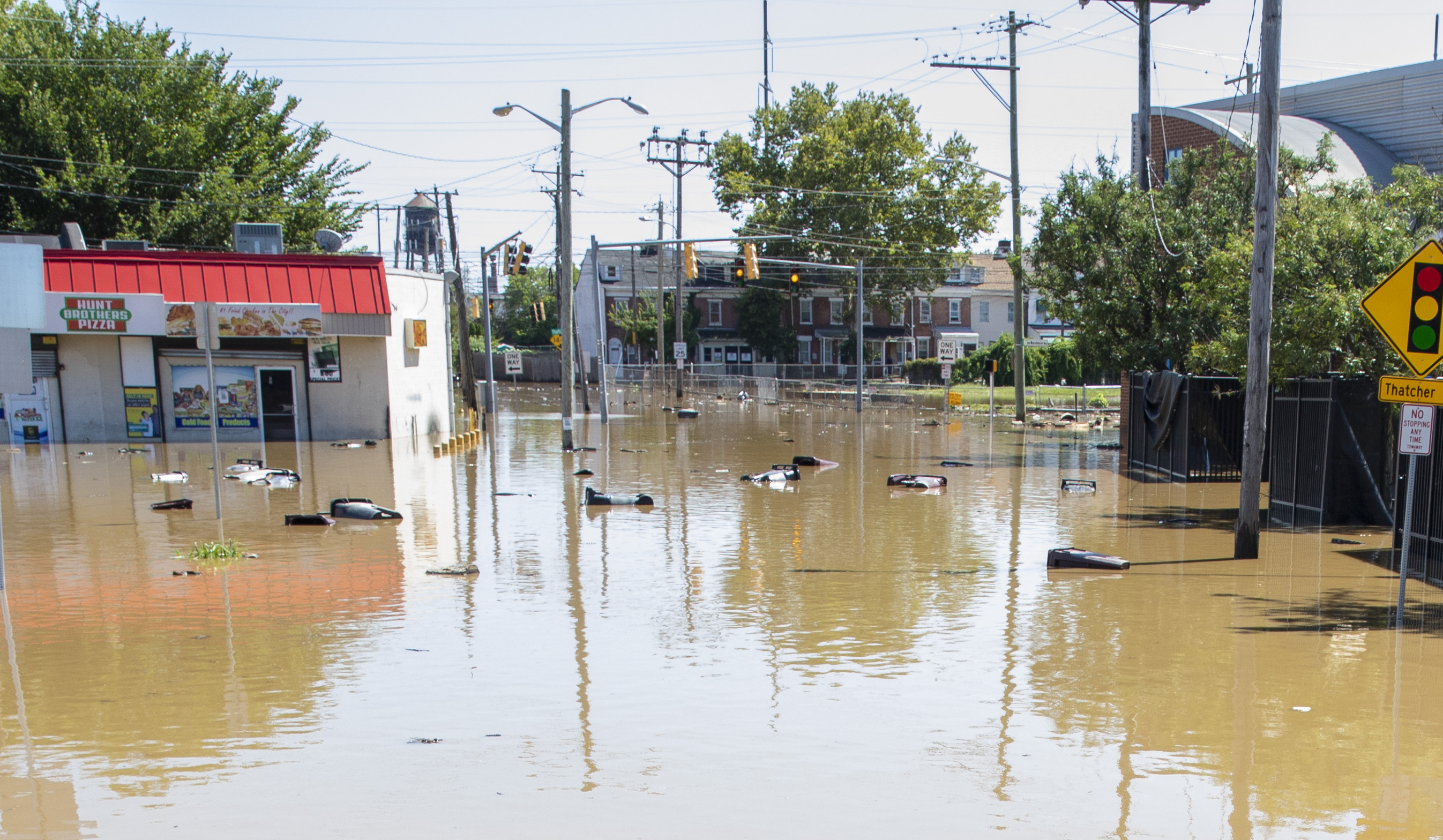
Hurricane Ida flooding in Wilmington, September 2, 2021

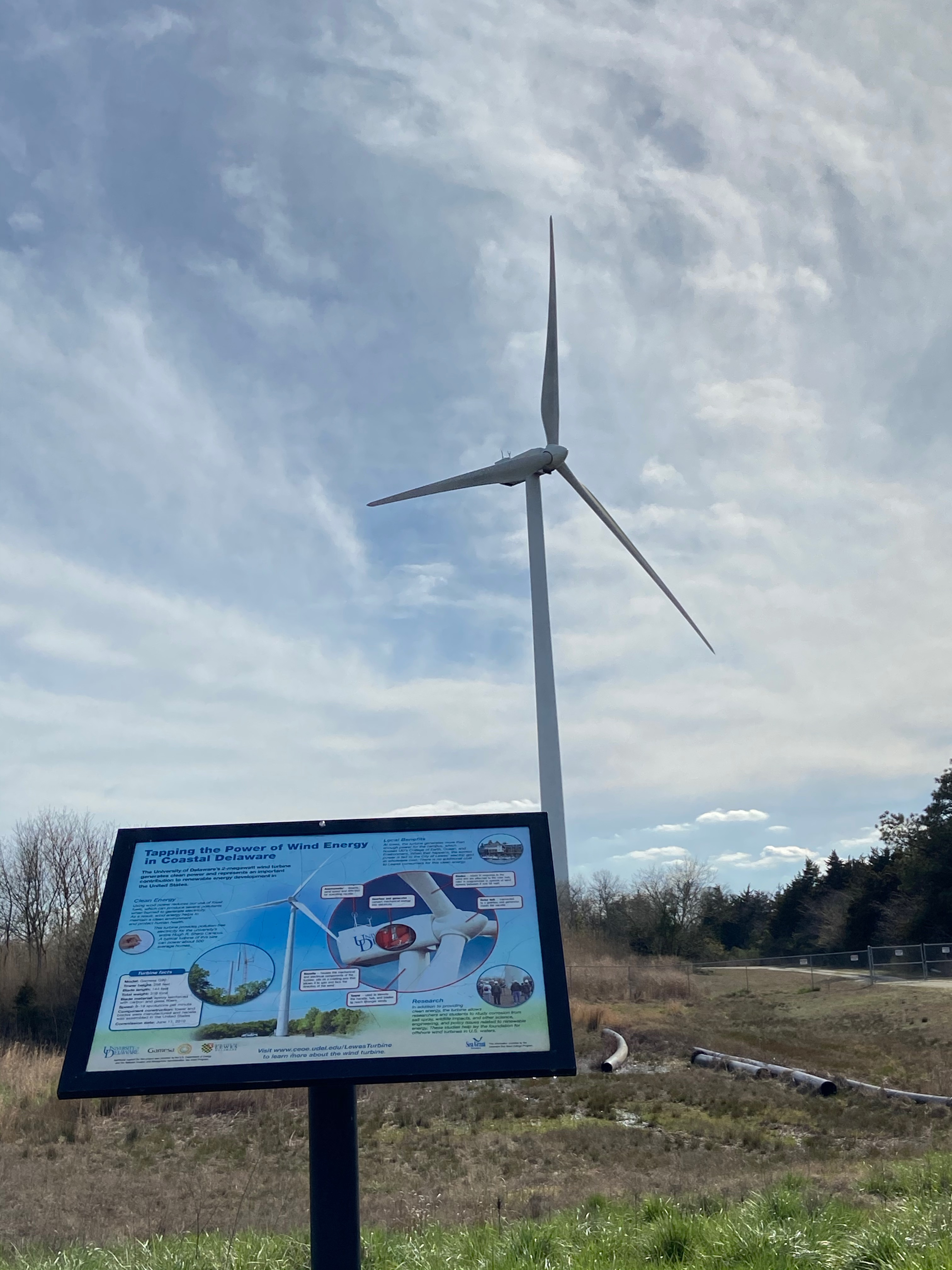
Wind turbine, Lewes

According to the EPA, "rising temperatures and shifting rainfall patterns are likely to increase the intensity of both floods and droughts. Average annual precipitation in Delaware has increased a few percent in the last century, and precipitation from extremely heavy storms has increased in the eastern United States by more than 25 percent since 1958. During the next century, annual precipitation and the frequency of heavy downpours are likely to keep rising. Precipitation is likely to increase during winter and spring, but not change significantly during summer and fall. Rising temperatures will melt snow earlier in spring and increase evaporation, and thereby dry the soil during summer and fall. As a result, climate change is likely to intensify flooding during winter and spring, and drought during summer and fall."

=== Ecosystems ===
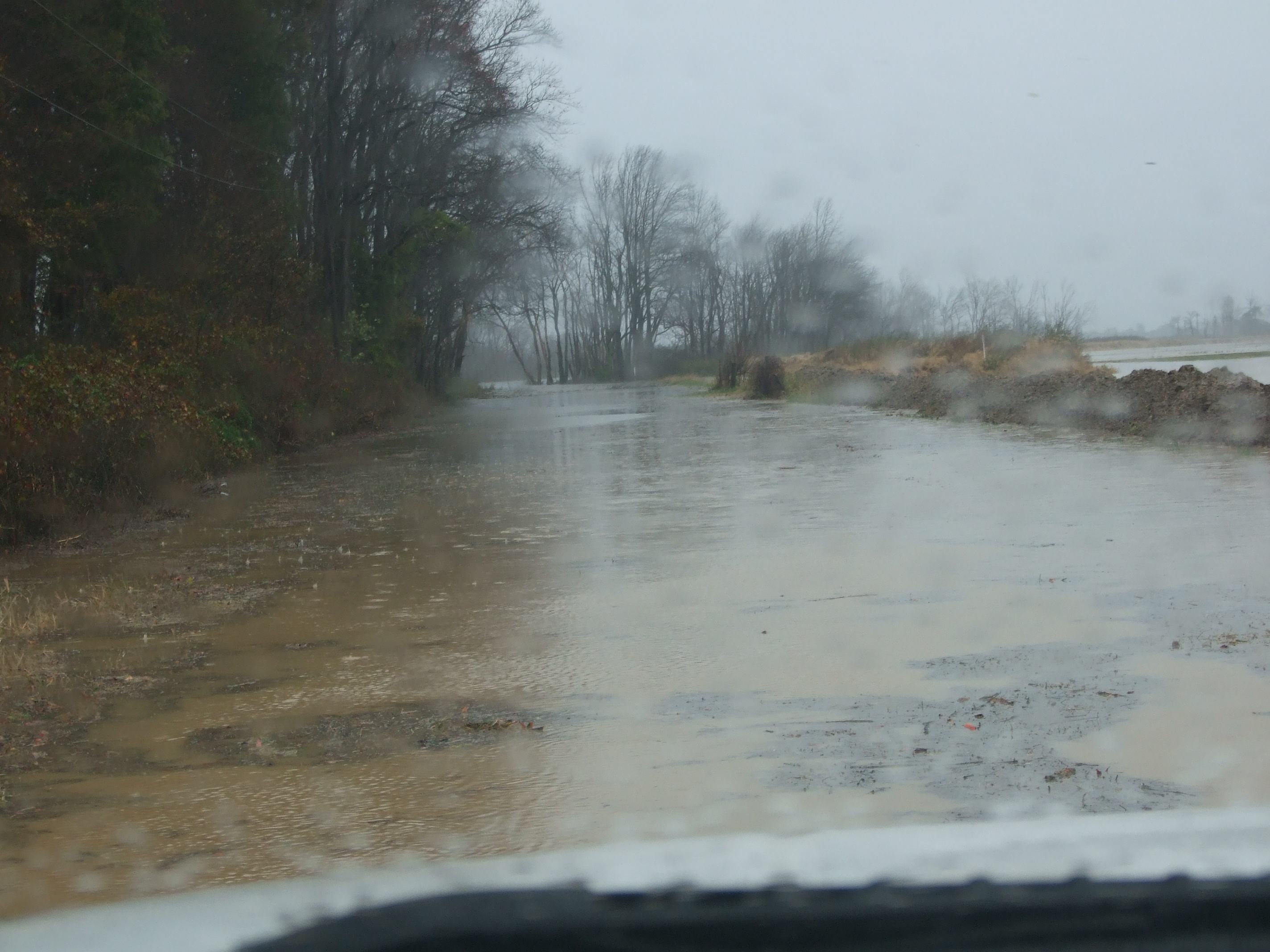
Flooded road during Hurricane Sandy, Prime Hook, 2012

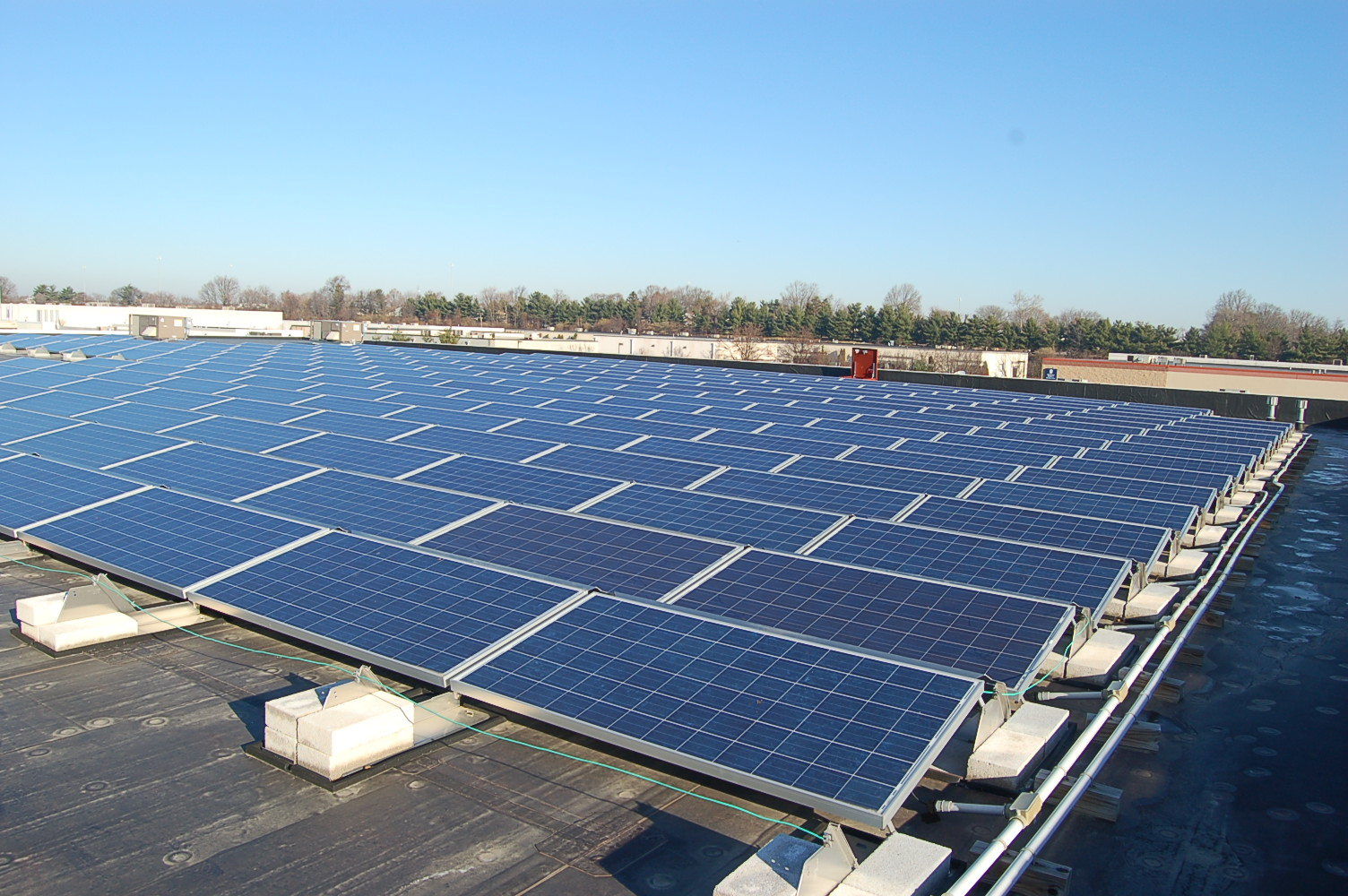
Solar installation, New Castle

According to the EPA, "the loss of tidal marshes could harm fish, reptiles, and birds that depend on a marsh for food or shelter. Blue crab, perch, weakfish, flounder, and rockfish rely on the tidal marshes in Delaware Bay to hide from predators and to feed on mussels, fiddler crabs, and other species. Sea turtles and shorebirds feed on some of the species that inhabit these marshes. Great blue herons, black ducks, ospreys, red-winged blackbirds, and several other bird species also use the salt marshes in Delaware Bay. As marshes erode, fish may benefit initially as more tidal channels form, which would make more marsh accessible. But after a point, erosion would make less marsh available, and populations of fish and birds would decline. The loss of bay beaches and tidal flats would also threaten some species. Delaware Bay is a major stopover area for six species of migratory shorebirds that feed on its beaches and tidal flats, including most of the Western Hemisphere’s red knot population. Nearly a million birds feed on the horseshoe crab eggs on the bay’s sandy beaches. Diamondback terrapin nest on estuarine beaches along Delaware’s inland bays".

The EPA further reports that "changing temperatures could also disrupt ecosystems. If water temperatures exceed 86°F during summer, eelgrass could be lost, which would remove a key source of food for many fish. Wildflowers and woody perennials are blooming—and migratory birds are arriving—sooner in spring. Not all species adjust in the same way, however, so the food that one species needs may no longer be available when that species arrives on its migration".

=== Saltwater intrusion ===
According to the EPA, "as sea level rises, salt water can mix farther inland or upstream in bays, rivers, and wetlands. Because water on the surface is connected to ground water, salt water can also intrude into aquifers near the coast. Soils may become too salty for the crops and trees that currently grow in low-lying areas".

== Economic and social impacts ==
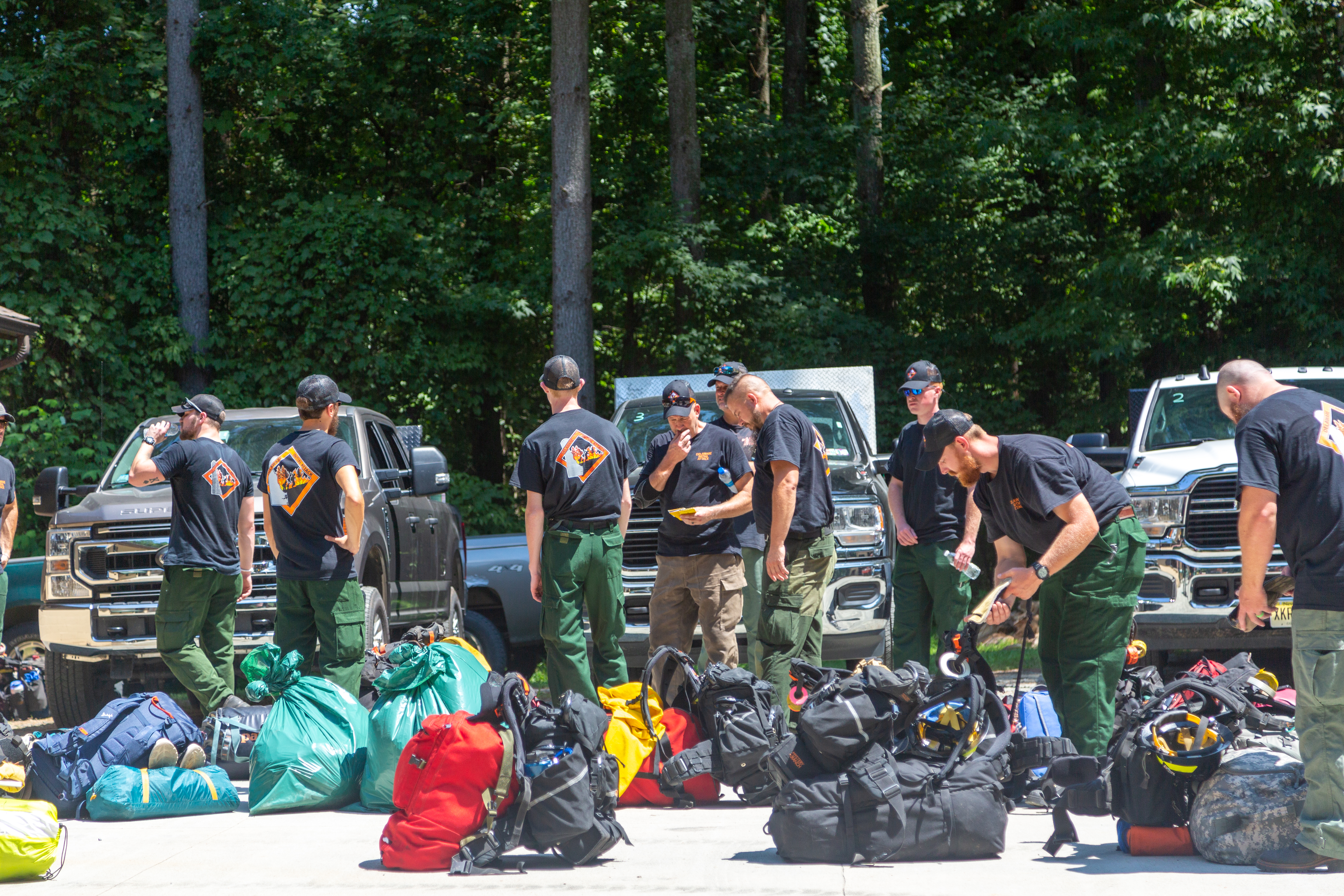
Delaware wildfire crew on assignment in California

=== Homes and infrastructure ===
According to the EPA, "towns along the Delaware shore shore will be increasingly vulnerable to storms and erosion as sea level rises. While hurricanes are rare, their wind speeds and rainfall intensities are likely to increase as the climate warms. Rising sea level is likely to increase flood insurance rates, while more frequent storms could increase deductibles for wind damage in homeowner insurance policies. Storms can destroy coastal homes, wash out highways and rail lines, and damage essential communication, energy, and wastewater management infrastructure".

=== Agriculture ===
According to the EPA, "changing the climate will have both harmful and beneficial effects on farming. Hotter summers are likely to reduce yields of corn. But higher concentrations of atmospheric carbon dioxide increase crop yields, and that fertilizing effect is likely to offset the harmful effects of heat on soybeans, assuming that adequate water is available. Although most chickens are raised indoors, warmer temperatures could reduce the productivity of livestock raised outside".

== Responses ==
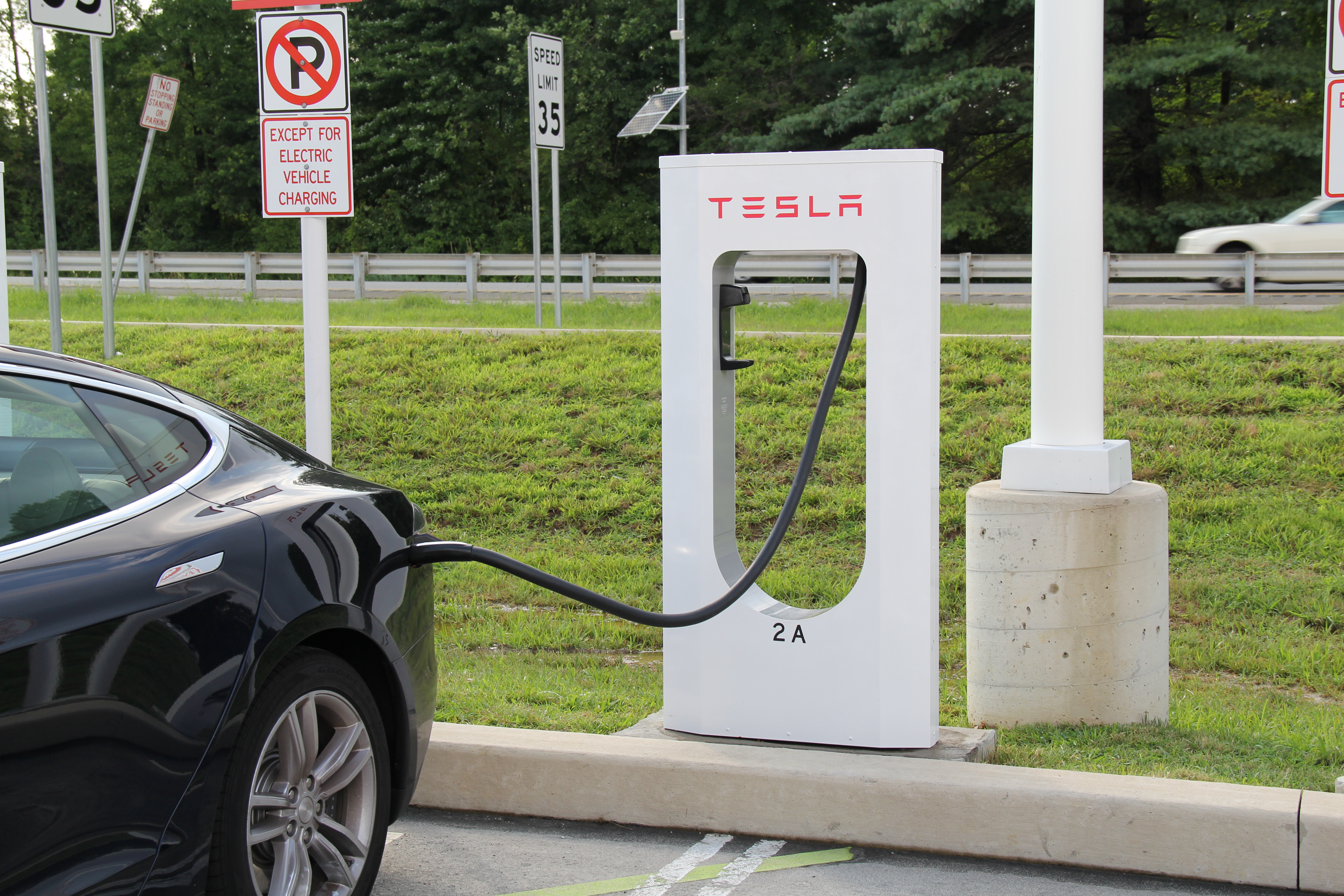
Tesla Supercharger, Delaware Welcome Center

=== State policy ===
In December 2019, Delaware joined consideration for a multi-state gasoline cap-and-trade program. The plan aims to reduce transportation-related tailpipe emissions, and would levy a tax on fuel companies based on carbon dioxide emissions. The most ambitious version of the plan is projected to reduce the area's tailpipe emissions by 25% between 2022 and 2032. The program is in the public comment phase, with individual states determining whether to participate. The program could begin as early as 2022.

== See also ==
- List of U.S. states and territories by carbon dioxide emissions
- Plug-in electric vehicles in Delaware
