= Mary Jones (physician) =

American physician, gynecological surgeon

Mary Amanda Jones
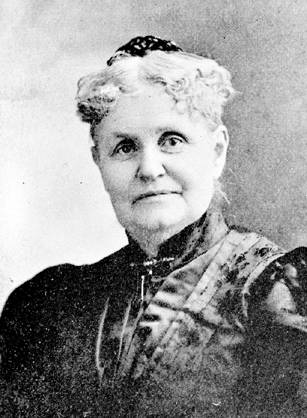
- Born: February 17, 1828; Dorchester County, Maryland
- Died: 1908 (aged 79–80); New York, New York
- Education: Wesleyan Female College (Wilmington); New York Hygeio-Therapeutic College (M.D.)
- Spouse: John Quincy Adams Jones
- Scientific career
- Fields: Medicine
- Workplaces: Women's Dispensary and Hospital of Brooklyn

Mary Amanda Dixon Jones (February 17, 1828 – 1908) was an American physician and surgeon in the field of obstetrics and gynecology, who was the first American physician to propose and perform a total hysterectomy to treat a tumor in the uterine muscle (myoma). Jones had a successful career until her work doing gynecological surgery at Woman's Hospital of Brooklyn drew the attention of the news media, and she was the subject of a 24-article investigative expose by the Brooklyn Eagle. As a result, she was charged with one count of murder, and one count of manslaughter. She was found not guilty, and sued the Eagle. She lost the libel case, and was forced to close her medical practice. Jones then spent the last years of her medical career researching the tissue pathology of gynecological conditions.

== Early life and education ==
Mary Amanda Dixon was born on February 17, 1828, in Dorchester County, Maryland. She was the daughter of Noah Dixon and Sally Turner Dixon. Noah and Sally had been married for 21 years before Mary's birth, allowing her to have many other siblings. She was raised in a Methodist family of shipbuilders on Maryland's eastern shore. Her parents made good money in their trade and were able to provide Mary with higher education.

She attended Wesleyan Female College in Wilmington, Delaware, and after graduation in 1845, she joined the faculty for four years to teach physiology and literature as a professor. She also became a principal of a girls' seminary in southern Maryland. During this time, she began studying medicine and informally apprenticed with Henry F. Askew, president of the American Medical Association. From 1850 to 1852, she taught at Baltimore Female College, and continued her studies in Baltimore with Thomas E. Bond Jr., who founded the Baltimore College of Dental Surgery. The apprenticeships Mary Dixon Jones obtained were the common first step for upcoming medical students, however, ones with prestigious associations with established practitioners were extremely difficult and uncommon for women to acquire.

== Early medical career and further education ==
In 1854 Dixon married a lawyer, John Quincy Adams Jones, and the couple relocated to Illinois and then later, Wisconsin. They had three children together. In 1862, Mary Jones moved, without her family, to New York City to study medicine at the Hygeio-Therapeutic Medical College, a water-cure institution teaching a therapeutic system that used water in curative ways. The college was co-educational, which provided women an option to study outside a standard curriculum medical colleges to study medicine and provide license to practice. While studying in New York, she was also introduced to abolitionism, reform, and women's rights. She lectured on the "laws of health", in hopes to attract patients. She also advertised in The Revolution, a women's rights journal, which was edited by Elizabeth Cady Stanton and published by Susan B. Anthony.

After graduating in 1862, she moved to Brooklyn and opened a private medical practice specializing in obstetric and gynecological surgery. She earned more than many other male physicians in New York. She settled in Brooklyn with her children, when the American Civil War ended, leaving her husband behind in Baltimore. Her husband Jones, preserved an active law practice in Maryland and he disappeared from her life in late 1870s.

After ten years, at the age of 44, Jones decided to obtain further training at Woman's Medical College of Pennsylvania in 1872. In 1873, she also studied with Mary Corinna Putnam Jacobi in New York, learning about the clinical diagnosis and the latest scientific techniques in pathology. In 1875, Dr. Dixon Jones graduated and specialized in female reproductive diseases and 1876, she started studying pathology with Dr. Charles Heitzman, a Hungarian-born immigrant, who was one of the founders of the American Dermatological Association. She returned to New York at Post-Graduate Medical school and Hospital to further her knowledge. From 1882 to 1891, she was a gynecologist at the Women's Hospital of Brooklyn. She was well known for her surgical skills and performing radical procedures in the field of gynecological surgery. She performed many dangerous yet life-saving operations on women. Those operations involved fibroid tumors, various forms of uterine and ovarian cancer, and distinct forms of infection on the fallopian tubes. She focused on surgery by using resources that were available in New York, such as a course in gynecology from Benjamin Franklin Dawson. Dawson was the founder of the American Journal of Obstetrics and Disease of Women and Children and had great knowledge on the emerging gynecological speciality. In 1881, Dixon was running her own hospital as she was appointed chief medical officer of the Women's Dispensary and Hospital of the city of Brooklyn, which provided her with many opportunities to pursue her gynecology surgery interest. A year later, she got into an argument with the hospital's board of regents, which resulted in the first women hospital being disbanded. Five months later, Dixon incorporated a second institution with the same name. Her son, Charles N. Dixon Jones, who graduated in 1876 from Long Island Medical College Hospital, helped her run the hospital.

Dixon remained settled within a medical subculture that was predominantly female. In 1872, she had other options to further her study such as University of Michigan, the Philadelphia college and New York Infirmary for Women and Children. However, she chose Pennsylvania and returned to Brooklyn to enhance her career strategies differing from her female peers. In the 19th century, the emergence of new specialties separate from general practice got much criticism from the public and the practitioners. Dixon Jones remained aspired throughout the whole process. Even though the accessibility of gynecology and gynecological surgery to women declined, Dixon persisted on promoting the new specialty. Many of her male colleagues understood the importance of her supporting enthusiastically to their modalities, which furthered her aspiration in medicine of gynecology.

== Specialization in obstetric and gynecologic surgery ==
Jones' interest in obstetrics and gynecology began when as a teacher, she used medical works to aid in teaching her students. In 1862, she later attended New York Hygeio-Therapeutic College where her interest in obstetrics and gynecology had provided her with an initiative to further her studies in the field of medicine. Jones' experience with patients with medical related issues to gynecology had laid her foundation with her strong interest in her field of work that had led her to be one of the leading surgeons in treatment of the female reproductive system. Jones also played an important role in advocating for the field of gynecology in the late 19th century as it became a medical practice that was seen as separate from the general practice of medicine. As an individual who was advocating for the field of gynecology in its early years, Jones had to oppose the norm to find methods of finding opportunities of apprenticeship or other ways to be part of surgery as the field of surgery was often seen as a male dominated field.

When she completed her studies in 1875, she returned to Brooklyn to a private practice and also worked at Woman's Hospital of Brooklyn. Working at the hospital, Jones was able to perform surgery and became skilled and honed those skills to eventually open up her own private practice. During her time spent at her own practice, she encountered many different gynecologically related problems in women such as fibroid tumors and infected tubes and appendages, that pushed her to meet with Dr. Carl Heitzman to serve as a mentor as he was specialized in pathology. This was in hopes of providing Jones additional research in gynecology. In addition to her practice, her time spent in New York had also allowed her to attend Post-Graduate Medical School and Hospital. Jones had taken a gynecology course from Benjamin Franklin Dawson who was affiliated with the creation of the American Journal of Obstetrics and Diseases of Women and Children to which she had also published her first work. Jones had taken the opportunity in New York to research and study the field of gynecology as Dawson was well known in the community of gynecology. In 1882, Jones became chief medical officer of Woman's Hospital of Brooklyn. Jones specialized in the treatment of complicated diseases of the women's reproductive system. Additionally, she studied the pathology of laboratory specimens for diseases she treated. During Jones' time at the Woman's Hospital of Brooklyn, she had expanded her medical experience when she performed 300 laparotomies in addition to observational experience at the Women's Hospital and Bellevue along with many other hospitals she frequented in New York. Jones' skills in networking with male had allowed her to work beside of very well-known surgeons at the time such as W. Gill Wylie, C. C. Lee, Henry Clark Coe, Arthur M. Jacobus, and Robert Tuttle Morris. Jones did not only research and had hands-on experience with obstetrics and gynecology, she had also had much of her works related to her specialization in obstetrics and gynecology published following her collaborative works with Lawson Tait in 1884. During her time with Lawson Tait, Jones spent much of her time networking with male colleagues and eventually was able to publish her first clinical case report, "A Case of Tait's Operation", in the American Journal of Obstetrics and Diseases of Women and Children that same year she met Tait. Jones had published this case report in hopes of getting her name known in the public by using Tait's name in the title as a tribute to her support for his work and that he was often associated with the field of gynecology. Jones published over fifty medical articles and was an associate editor of the American Journal of Surgery and Gynecology, and the Woman's Medical Journal.

In 1888, Jones removed the uterus and a 17-pound tumor from a living patient. The patient recovered within several weeks making Jones the first American physician to perform a successful total hysterectomy for an uterine myoma (uterine fibroid tumor). Jones success in performing a total hysterectomy had allowed her to gain recognition when presented at the New York Pathological Society. In addition, her recognition extended out to various medical journals.

Beginning in the 1890s, Jones shifted her focus with regard to gynecological work that focused more on laboratory work with regard to pathology and was able to use this knowledge in conjunction with diagnosis related to gynecological problems. In the following two decades, surgery was involved with utilizing microscopes as a way to diagnose patients. Jones along with the individuals whom she worked with were very much involved in the change of the way medicine was approached towards diagnoses following with surgical procedures in the clinical setting.

Jones' overall medical experience over the 19th century had highlighted the new innovations such as increasing knowledge in medicine along with the inclusion of laboratory work to which she had taken advantage of in her specialization in obstetrics and gynecology. Through her experiences, she had proven herself to be considered at one of the pioneers in gynecological surgery that had shifted the preconceived notions that men were the only individuals involved in the field of surgery. Her efforts had not only shown through her experience but also many of her published works that highlighted her experience in surgical techniques along with what goes on in the operating rooms as the attending surgeon.

== Investigative news report and court trial ==
On April 24, 1889 The Brooklyn Eagle started a twenty-four piece investigative report on Jones and the Woman's Hospital of Brooklyn. The paper claimed that she was forcing women to undergo unnecessary procedures and used organs removed from their bodies to advance her reputation in diagnosis and pathology. They also implied that she improperly handled the hospital's finances. Within Brooklyn, the pieces caught the attention of the legal authorities. This gave rise to two manslaughter charges, and on May 31, 1889, a grand jury indicted her along with her son and surgical partner, Charles Dixon Jones. They were charged with murder in the second degree for the death of Sarah Bates, manslaughter in the second degree in the death of Ida Hunt, and eight malpractices suits that made their way through the courts. Almost three hundred witnesses testified, including leading physicians, craftsmen and seamstresses, immigrants, tradesman and their wives, and her former patients. The case gained popular attention with spectators filling the courtroom day after day, possibly because for the first time, jars full of specimens and surgical mannequins became common sights in the courtrooms. The press even covered the trial with interest with The New York Tribune claiming the inquiry "by far the most important ever tried in this city." The trial occurred from February 17, 1890, to February 23, 1890, and Mary Jones was found not guilty, and Charles Jones had a directed acquittal. It took over two years to completely clear her name of all criminal and civil charges. When the whole ordeal was over, Mary Jones Dixon filed a suit against the Eagle seeking 300,000 dollars in damages. During the case, Mary Dixon Jones's lawyers used her sex in their defense, claiming that her work embraced "the best in femininity". Moreover, her attorneys presented 69,000 words of printed material into the record, a document the size of a short novel, containing the alleged libelous material. Her attorneys once more brought in expert witnesses who testified to her skill and reputation as a physician. When Mary Dixon Jones took the stand, her own testimony worked against her. Based on her interactions with the judge, the all-male jury perceived her as un-motherly and not the caring doctor that her lawyers had suggested. Her confident attitude was noted as "especially heinous" because she was a woman physician. The Eagle's lawyer said that she had "unsexed" herself by demanding to be addressed as "Doctor", instead of "Mrs.". During his closing brief, he pronounced her as "an old woman" with an "uplifted knife", and even hinted at witchery. After 37 hours of deliberation, the jury found the Eagle innocent of libeling her in 1892 and Jones lost the suit. When she lost the case her hospital's charter was revoked and she was forced to close it for good. She relocated her practice to New York City and continued her medical work publishing on gynecological pathology. Mary Dixon Jones trial is the longest libel suit tried in the United States to date. Additionally, The Brooklyn Citizen, The Brooklyn Times, The New York Times, and the New York World continued to highlight her story after the case was over. The Brooklyn Medical Journal claimed that the event involved the "honor and reputation" of their medical establishment, and the Journal of The American Medical Association even commented on the verdict. Tensions around the press got so high that a month after Jones lost the libel suit, her son Charles broke into the home of Dr. Joseph H. Raymond, the former Brooklyn Health Commissioner and editor of the Brooklyn Medical Journal. Charles dragged the older man from his bed and horsewhipped him when he refused to retract a negative additional that had just been published by the Journal. The affair was eventually settled over an apology, but the incident highlights the intense role the press had within the case.

== Publications or other works ==
During her time as a physician, Mary Dixon Jones wrote and published many medical articles and was an associate editor for many well known medical journals such as the American Journal of Surgery and Gynecology and the Woman's Medical Journal, and the Philadelphia Times and Register. She published over fifty of these medical articles for others to read and study about this subject matter related to her field of work. Mary Dixon Jones was also a member of the New York Pathological Society and was well known for her work at home and abroad.

== Later career, death, and legacy ==
After Jones lost the libel case, she was forced to close her medical practice, give up performing surgeries, and move back to New York. At the age of 64, she decided to continue her work by researching the tissue pathology of diseases of the women's reproductive system and conducting other microscopical studies. During this time she worked to study and further understand many of the diseases that she had actually treated and observed during her time as a physician. She was one of the only surgeons specialized in gynecology that placed a high importance on studying the pathology of these diseases in a laboratory setting and was even a member of the New York Pathological Society. Dr. Mary Dixon Jones died in 1908 at the age of 80 in New York City, leaving a lasting legacy in the world of medicine, and not just in her specific field of Obstetrics and Gynecology. From performing the first full hysterectomy in 1888 to being one of the most successful physicians practicing at the time, she succeed and persevered despite the many challenges she faced during her career, including her very public legal trial, and the disadvantages she faced for being a woman physician during this period.
