= Tritek =

Tritek Technologies, Inc.

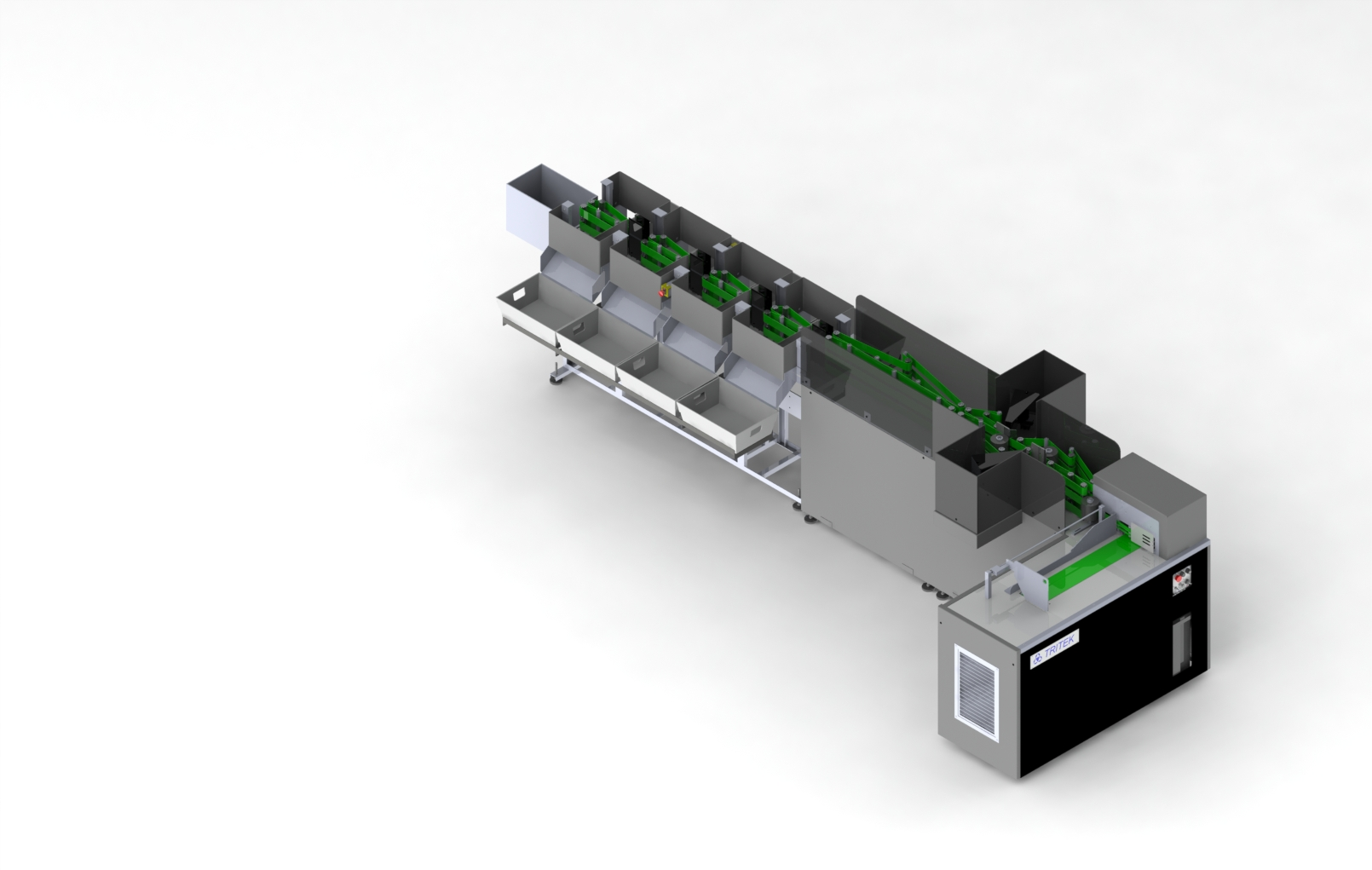
- Tritek's Compact 8-Bin Mail Sorting Machine
- Type: Private
- Founded: 1984; 42 years ago
- Founder: James Malatesta
- Headquarters: Wilmington, DE, US
- Area served: Worldwide
- Key people: James Malatesta (President & CEO)
- Products: Mail sorting, Compact Elite, Nomad, Tritek® Compact, ACE Workstation, Inbound Presort Mail, Digital Email Delivery, Return Mail, Correct Elect Vote by Mail
- Website: tritektech.com

Tritek Technologies, Inc. was founded in 1984 by inventor and innovator James Malatesta. Headquartered in Wilmington, Delaware, USA. It specializes in custom designed hardware and software for mail processing equipment, imaging, and vote-by-mail. It has many patents in mail sorting and processing.

Tritek provides machinery and services to Fortune 500 companies and educational institutions. Its customers include J P Morgan Chase Bank and George Mason University. Washington state, Sedgwick County, Kansas, Camden County, New Jersey, the five boroughs of New York City, Napa County California, the state of Delaware, Kansas City, Missouri, and Charleston, South Carolina all rely upon Tritek's vote-by-mail technology for processing mailed-in ballots during elections.

Tritek's assembly plant is in Wilmington, Delaware where the company also operates a mail processing center. It is a global company providing products and services to European countries, universities, presorted mail businesses, and many US government postal operations. It is a multi-million dollar privately owned company.

Tritek has worked with well-known organizations such as Siemens, the United States Postal Service, and Lockheed Martin.

== History ==
Tritek's sister company, Independent Computer Services (ICS), was established as a mail sorting machine service company for Canadian-based Leigh Marsland Mail Sorting Equipment in 1981. In 1984, ICS purchased the worldwide rights to Leigh Mail Sorting Technology. ICS eventually developed their own reader and computer systems to replace aging components in the legacy equipment. ICS developed an optical character reader (OCR) and named it the Model 88-5. This reader was used to presort mail on Leigh Instrument (Canada) mail sorting machines. ICS named the development company of the 88–5 Tritek Technologies. This name was derived from the three technologies used in mail sortation: conveying, computing and sorting.

In 1988, Tritek introduced the first multi-font programmable optical reader for mail processing machines. Tritek developed the first high-speed flats sorter in 1991 and named it the 91–5 Ultrasorter. The United States Postal Service tested the 91–5 under their FMBCS (flat mail barcode sorter) development project as a high speed flats sorter replacement. The Postal Service licensed Tritek's technology which is still in use today.

In 2003 Tritek developed "Rule Editor" software that sorts mail according to a custom programmed set of software rules tied to a database. This software allows organizations to sort generically addressed inbound mail pieces, handle ad mail, or forward mail to a different address.

Since 2009 Tritek Technologies has been handling undeliverable mail pieces that the post office returned to the sender. Returned mail often features marked-up address blocks, stickers, and stamps that obscure original addressing information making this material difficult to process with automated equipment.

== Partners ==
Cambridge Corporate Services uses Tritek automated mail sorting machines to internally handle high volumes of mail.

== Products ==
- Tritek Compact - Small Footprint Mail Sorter
- ACE Parcel Processing Station
- Inbound Mail Processing Equipment
- Presort Mail Processing Equipment
- Return Mail Processing Equipment
- Vote-by-Mail Processing and Signature Verification
- Mail Tracking Systems
- Character Recognition Software
- Parcel Sorting
- Mail Forwarding
- Digital E-Mail Delivery
- Multi-Level Sorting Systems
- Rule-based Software
