= USS Delaware =

USS Delaware may refer to the following ships of the United States Navy:

- USS Delaware (1776), was a 24-gun frigate built in 1776 and captured by the British in 1777
- USS Delaware (1798), was a 20-gun ship purchased in 1798
- USS Delaware (1820), was a 74-gun ship of the line, launched in 1820 and burned in 1861
- USS Delaware (1861), was a side-wheel steamer built in 1861 and decommissioned in 1865
- USS Delaware (1866), was a screw steamer renamed from Piscataqua in 1869
- USS Delaware (BB-28), was a battleship commissioned in 1910 and scrapped in 1924
- SP-467 (later AT-5S and YT-111) served in the Navy from 1917 to 1923. Although officially known as SP-467, she was erroneously listed under her merchant name of Delaware on various occasions.
- USS Delaware (SSN-791), a Virginia-class submarine commissioned in 2020

== See also ==
- SS Diamond State, an auxiliary Keystone State-class crane ship launched in 1961 and in ready reserve since 1989.
- The Captain from Connecticut, a novel by C. S. Forester largely set aboard a fictional USS Delaware during the War of 1812.
