= Abortion in Delaware =

Abortion in Delaware is legal up to the point of fetal viability. As of June 2024, Civiqs polling found that 72% of Delawareans believed that abortion should be legal in all or most cases, while 23% believed it should be illegal in all or most cases. There was a therapeutic exceptions in the state's legislative ban on abortions by 1900. Informed consent laws were on the books by 2007. In 2017, Senator Bryan Townsend, D-Newark introduced legislation to try to make clear that abortion would remain legal in the state in case 1973's Roe v. Wade ruling was overturned. The legislation was subsequently updated. Attempts have been made to introduce mandatory ultrasound laws, but they failed to get out of committee. State legislators tried to move ahead the week at which a woman could get a legal abortion in 2019.

There were seven abortion clinics in 1982, eight in 1992 and three in 2014. There were 2,920 legal abortions in the state in 2014 and 2,889 in 2015. The state had an active abortion rights community in 2019, participating in #StoptheBans movement with a protest at Rodney Square in Wilmington.

== History ==
=== Legislative history ===
By the end of the 1800s, all states in the Union except Louisiana had therapeutic exceptions in their legislative bans on abortions. In the 19th century, bans by state legislatures on abortion were about protecting the life of the mother given the number of deaths caused by abortions; state governments saw themselves as looking out for the lives of their citizens.

The state was one of ten states in 2007 to have a customary informed consent provision for abortions. A Republican legislative member introduced an abortion ban at week 20 in 2017. The Democratic controlled legislature prevented this bill from even reaching a floor vote. In 2017, Senator Bryan Townsend, D-Newark introduced legislation to try to make clear that abortion would remain legal in the state in case 1973's Roe v. Wade ruling was overturned (which it was in 2022.) Townsend said of Republican legislative efforts at the time in relation to his own bill, "They talk about the issue as if it is not a complicated, difficult, heart-wrenching one for women." The state legislature updated Delaware's legal code in 2017 around abortion. It now read, "the termination of a pregnancy prior to viability, to protect the life or health of the mother, or in the event of serious fetal anomaly."

In August 2018, the state had a law to protect the right to have an abortion. Senator Bryant Richardson (R-Seaford) introduced an ultrasound before getting an abortion bill in 2018, but it did not get out of committee. In Senate District 21, Democrat Bob Wheatley sought to oust Richardson in elections on November 6, 2018, in part related to Richardson's abortion stance.

In early 2019, a bill had been introduced as was being debated over when abortion should be banned. New proposed legislation would move the date to 20 weeks. At the time it was being discussed, it looked like it would not be likely to pass. As of May 14, 2019, the state prohibited abortions after the fetus was viable, generally some point between week 24 and 28. This period uses a standard defined by the US Supreme Court in 1973 with the Roe v. Wade ruling. Bryant Richardson introduced a bill in 2019 that would have required women seeking abortions to have the required legal option to have non-medically necessitated ultrasound to see the fetal "heartbeat". According to Richardson, this bill, "It gives women all the information that's available to make a good decision. [...] It's all about women's rights."

=== Judicial history ===
The US Supreme Court's decision in 1973's Roe v. Wade ruling meant the state could no longer regulate abortion in the first trimester. However, the Supreme Court overturned Roe v. Wade in Dobbs v. Jackson Women's Health Organization, No. 19-1392, 597 U.S. ___ (2022) later in 2022.

=== Clinic history ===
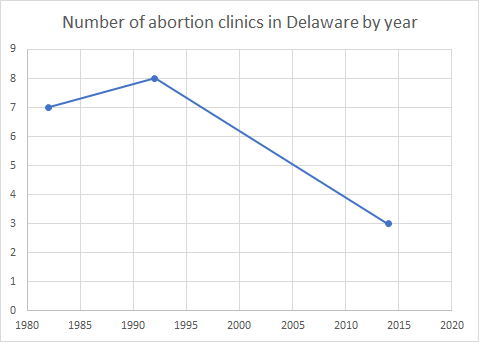
Number of abortion clinics in Delaware by year

Between 1982 and 1992, the number of abortion clinics in the state increased by one, going from seven in 1982 to eight in 1992. In 2014, there were three abortion clinics in the state. In 2014, 33% of the counties in the state did not have an abortion clinic. That year, 18% of women in the state aged 15–44 lived in a county without an abortion clinic. In March 2016, there were three Planned Parenthood clinics in the state. In 2017, there were three Planned Parenthood clinics in a state with a population of 212,554 women aged 15–49 of which two offered abortion services. In 2018, first-trimester abortions in the state generally cost around US$500.

== Statistics ==
In the period between 1972 and 1974, there were zero recorded illegal abortion deaths in the state. In 1990, 80,000 women in the state faced the risk of an unintended pregnancy. In 2010, the state had one publicly funded abortion, which was federally funded. In 2013, among white women aged 15–19, there were 80 abortions, 230 abortions for black women aged 15–19, 130 abortions for Hispanic women aged 15–19, and 20 abortions for women of all other races.

In 2014, 55% of adults said in a poll by the Pew Research Center that abortion should be legal and 38% said it should be illegal in all or most cases. As of June 2024, Civiqs polling found that 72% of Delawareans believed that abortion should be legal in all or most cases, while 23% believed it should be illegal in all or most cases.

In 2017, the state had an infant mortality rate of 6.6 deaths per 1,000 live births.

Number of reported abortions, abortion rate and percentage change in rate by geographic region and state in 1992, 1995 and 1996
Census division and state	Number			Rate			% change 1992–1996
Census division and state	1992	1995	1996	1992	1995	1996	% change 1992–1996
South Atlantic	269,200	261,990	263,600	25.9	24.6	24.7	–5
Delaware	5,730	5,790	4,090	35.2	34.4	24.1	–32
District of Columbia	21,320	21,090	20,790	138.4	151.7	154.5	12
Florida	84,680	87,500	94,050	30	30	32	7
Georgia	39,680	36,940	37,320	24	21.2	21.1	–12
Maryland	31,260	30,520	31,310	26.4	25.6	26.3	0
North Carolina	36,180	34,600	33,550	22.4	21	20.2	–10
South Carolina	12,190	11,020	9,940	14.2	12.9	11.6	–19
Virginia	35,020	31,480	29,940	22.7	20	18.9	–16
West Virginia	3,140	3,050	2,610	7.7	7.6	6.6	–14

Number, rate, and ratio of reported abortions, by reporting area of residence and occurrence and by percentage of abortions obtained by out-of-state residents, US CDC estimates
Location	Residence			Occurrence			% obtained by out-of-state residents	Year	Ref
Location	No.	Rate^	Ratio^^	No.	Rate^	Ratio^^	% obtained by out-of-state residents	Year	Ref
Delaware				5,730	35.2			1992	
Delaware				5,790	34.4			1995	
Delaware				4,090	24.1			1996	
Delaware	2,920	16.2	266	2,937	16.3	268	16	2014	
Delaware	2,889	16	259	2,785	15.4	249	15	2015	
Delaware	2,517	14.0	229	2,170	12.1	197	12.8	2016	
^number of abortions per 1,000 women aged 15–44; ^^number of abortions per 1,000 live births

== Abortion rights views and activities ==
=== Views ===
Network Delaware's Reproductive Justice Campaign's Shané Darby at a protest in May 2019, "Anti-abortion laws are a direct attack on women. [...] Especially women that are economically disadvantaged and women of color. Anything to do with our reproductive system is health care. Our health care should be legal, safe and affordable."

=== Protests ===
Women from the state participated in marches supporting abortion rights as part of a #StoptheBans movement in May 2019. At the protest at Rodney Square in Wilmington, dozens of people participated, carrying signs saying things like "Abortion is health care", "My choice, my right", and "We won't go back. Government, stay out of women's bodies." Speakers included Network Delaware's Reproductive Justice Campaign's Shané Darby.

Following the leak of the overturn of Roe v. Wade on May 2, 2022, an abortion rights protest was held in Wilmington.

== Anti-abortion views and activities ==
=== Violence ===
On January 3, 2020, a high school student, Samuel Gulick, spray-painted "Deus Vult" on a clinic in Newark, Delaware before throwing a Molotov Cocktail at the front window. Gulick was sentenced to 26 months in prison by a federal judge.
