= Peninsula Compost =

Food waste composting company in US

Peninsula Compost Company, LLC is a commercial composting company set up to manage a 200,000 ton per year food waste facility which started operations in Wilmington, Delaware, in 2009. The facility is located at a 27-acre complex and was developed in partnership with local companies EDiS Construction and Port Contractors. Waste Management announced a "strategic investment" in the facility in 2011. Management Brian Schaffer Executive Vice President Nelson Widell VP Sales and Marketing Charles Gifford Managing Partner Whitney Hall Engineer Scott Woods CEO
