= Delaware statistical areas =

Coordinates: 38.9896°N 75.5050°W

The U.S. State of Delaware currently has four statistical areas that have been delineated by the Office of Management and Budget (OMB). On July 21, 2023, the OMB delineated one combined statistical area, two metropolitan statistical areas, and one micropolitan statistical area in Delaware. As of 2023, the largest statistical area in the state is the Philadelphia-Reading-Camden, PA-NJ-DE-MD Combined Statistical Area, which includes Delaware's largest city, Wilmington.

== Statistical areas ==
The Office of Management and Budget (OMB) has designated more than 1,000 statistical areas for the United States and Puerto Rico. These statistical areas are important geographic delineations of population clusters used by the OMB, the United States Census Bureau, planning organizations, and federal, state, and local government entities.

The OMB defines a core-based statistical area (commonly referred to as a CBSA) as the county or counties (or county-equivalents) surrounding at least one densely-settled core of at least 10,000 population, "plus adjacent counties having a high degree of social and economic integration with the core as measured through commuting ties with the counties containing the core". The OMB further divides core-based statistical areas based on population into metropolitan statistical areas (MSAs) for those with at least 50,000 and micropolitan statistical areas (μSAs) for those with 10,000 to 49,999 people.

The OMB defines a combined statistical area (CSA) as two or more adjacent core-based statistical areas where the employment interchange rate (% commuting from A to B plus % commuting from B to A) is at least 15%. The primary statistical areas (PSAs) include all combined statistical areas and any core-based statistical area that is not a constituent of a combined statistical area.

The four United States statistical areas and three counties of the State of Delaware (Note: An out-of-state area and its population are displayed in green. An area that extends into more than one state is displayed in purple. A purple population number over a black population number show the total population versus the in-state population. The state's abbreviation is also shown next to the in-state total.)
Combined statistical area	2025 population (est.)	Core-based statistical area	2025 population (est.)	County	2025 population (est.)	Metropolitan division	2025 population (est.)
Philadelphia-Reading-Camden, PA-NJ-DE-MD CSA	7,493,171; 782,812 (DE)	Philadelphia-Camden-Wilmington, PA-NJ-DE-MD MSA	6,329,118; 588,026 (DE)	Philadelphia County, Pennsylvania	1,574,281	Philadelphia, PA MD	2,155,218
Philadelphia-Reading-Camden, PA-NJ-DE-MD CSA	7,493,171; 782,812 (DE)	Philadelphia-Camden-Wilmington, PA-NJ-DE-MD MSA	6,329,118; 588,026 (DE)	Delaware County, Pennsylvania	580,937	Philadelphia, PA MD	2,155,218
Philadelphia-Reading-Camden, PA-NJ-DE-MD CSA	7,493,171; 782,812 (DE)	Philadelphia-Camden-Wilmington, PA-NJ-DE-MD MSA	6,329,118; 588,026 (DE)	Montgomery County, Pennsylvania	877,643	Montgomery County-Bucks County-Chester County, PA MD	2,082,587
Philadelphia-Reading-Camden, PA-NJ-DE-MD CSA	7,493,171; 782,812 (DE)	Philadelphia-Camden-Wilmington, PA-NJ-DE-MD MSA	6,329,118; 588,026 (DE)	Bucks County, Pennsylvania	647,828	Montgomery County-Bucks County-Chester County, PA MD	2,082,587
Philadelphia-Reading-Camden, PA-NJ-DE-MD CSA	7,493,171; 782,812 (DE)	Philadelphia-Camden-Wilmington, PA-NJ-DE-MD MSA	6,329,118; 588,026 (DE)	Chester County, Pennsylvania	557,116	Montgomery County-Bucks County-Chester County, PA MD	2,082,587
Philadelphia-Reading-Camden, PA-NJ-DE-MD CSA	7,493,171; 782,812 (DE)	Philadelphia-Camden-Wilmington, PA-NJ-DE-MD MSA	6,329,118; 588,026 (DE)	Camden County, New Jersey	535,799	Camden, NJ MD	1,329,876
Philadelphia-Reading-Camden, PA-NJ-DE-MD CSA	7,493,171; 782,812 (DE)	Philadelphia-Camden-Wilmington, PA-NJ-DE-MD MSA	6,329,118; 588,026 (DE)	Burlington County, New Jersey	481,439	Camden, NJ MD	1,329,876
Philadelphia-Reading-Camden, PA-NJ-DE-MD CSA	7,493,171; 782,812 (DE)	Philadelphia-Camden-Wilmington, PA-NJ-DE-MD MSA	6,329,118; 588,026 (DE)	Gloucester County, New Jersey	312,638	Camden, NJ MD	1,329,876
Philadelphia-Reading-Camden, PA-NJ-DE-MD CSA	7,493,171; 782,812 (DE)	Philadelphia-Camden-Wilmington, PA-NJ-DE-MD MSA	6,329,118; 588,026 (DE)	New Castle County, Delaware	588,026	Wilmington, DE-MD-NJ MD	782,812; 588,026 (DE)
Philadelphia-Reading-Camden, PA-NJ-DE-MD CSA	7,493,171; 782,812 (DE)	Philadelphia-Camden-Wilmington, PA-NJ-DE-MD MSA	6,329,118; 588,026 (DE)	Cecil County, Maryland	107,131	Wilmington, DE-MD-NJ MD	782,812; 588,026 (DE)
Philadelphia-Reading-Camden, PA-NJ-DE-MD CSA	7,493,171; 782,812 (DE)	Philadelphia-Camden-Wilmington, PA-NJ-DE-MD MSA	6,329,118; 588,026 (DE)	Salem County, New Jersey	66,280	Wilmington, DE-MD-NJ MD	782,812; 588,026 (DE)
Philadelphia-Reading-Camden, PA-NJ-DE-MD CSA	7,493,171; 782,812 (DE)	Reading, PA MSA	440,072	Berks County, Pennsylvania	440,072	none	
Philadelphia-Reading-Camden, PA-NJ-DE-MD CSA	7,493,171; 782,812 (DE)	Atlantic City-Hammonton, NJ MSA	372,047	Atlantic County, New Jersey	278,657	none	
Philadelphia-Reading-Camden, PA-NJ-DE-MD CSA	7,493,171; 782,812 (DE)	Atlantic City-Hammonton, NJ MSA	372,047	Cape May County, New Jersey	93,390	none	
Philadelphia-Reading-Camden, PA-NJ-DE-MD CSA	7,493,171; 782,812 (DE)	Dover, DE MSA	194,786	Kent County, Delaware	194,786	none	
Philadelphia-Reading-Camden, PA-NJ-DE-MD CSA	7,493,171; 782,812 (DE)	Vineland, NJ MSA	157,148	Cumberland County, New Jersey	157,148	none	
none		Seaford, DE μSA	277,140	Sussex County, Delaware	277,140	none	
State of Delaware					1,059,952	none	

The three core-based statistical areas of the State of Delaware (Note: For CBSAs comprising populations from multiple states, they are listed twice to show both their intrastate population within that CBSA as well as the CBSA's total population. Only the intrastate population is ranked.)
2025 rank	Core-based statistical area	Population				
2025 rank	Core-based statistical area	2025 estimate	Change	2020 Census	Change	2010 Census
1	Philadelphia-Camden-Wilmington, PA-NJ-DE-MD MSA (DE)	588,026	+3.03%	570,719	+5.99%	538,479
2	Seaford, DE μSA	277,140	+16.75%	237,378	+20.41%	197,145
3	Dover, DE MSA	194,786	+7.11%	181,851	+12.04%	162,310
	Philadelphia-Camden-Wilmington, PA-NJ-DE-MD MSA	6,329,118	+1.35%	6,245,051	+4.69%	5,965,343

The one combined statistical area of the State of Delaware (Note: For CSAs comprising populations from multiple states, they are listed twice to show both their intrastate population within that CSA as well as the CSA's total population. Only the intrastate population is ranked.)
2025 rank	Combined statistical area	Population				
2025 rank	Combined statistical area	2025 estimate	Change	2020 Census	Change	2010 Census
1	Philadelphia-Reading-Camden, PA-NJ-DE-MD CSA (DE)	782,812	+4.02%	752,570	+7.39%	700,789
	Philadelphia-Reading-Camden, PA-NJ-DE-MD CSA	7,493,171	+1.54%	7,379,700	+4.41%	7,067,807

== See also ==
- Geography of Delaware
  - Demographics of Delaware
