= Plug-in electric vehicles in Delaware =

Overall numbers

As of March 2021, there were about 4,000 electric vehicles in Delaware. As of May 2023, there were just 142 charging locations located in Delaware, putting Delaware in the bottom 10 states for charging stations in the US. According to official sources (see above source) only 11 new charging stations have been added in the past two years. Information for Delaware's laws and incentives for electric vehicles can be found at the United States Department of Energy's Alternative Fuel Data Center.

== Government policy ==
As of May 2022, the state government offers tax rebates of up to $2,500 for battery electric vehicle purchases, and $1,000 for plug-in hybrid vehicles. Listed under the Delaware Clean Vehicle Rebate Program, it provides a cash rebate that must be applied within 90 days of the purchase of the vehicle.

== Charging stations ==
As of July 2022, there were 131 public charging stations in Delaware, with 25 of them offering DC charging. By July 2023, municipalities of over 30,000 must establish a permitting procedure for the development of electric charging stations.

The Infrastructure Investment and Jobs Act, signed into law in November 2021, allocates US$18 million to charging stations in Delaware.

As of August 2022, the state government recognizes I-95, US-13, US-113, and DE-1 as potential charging station corridors, with plans for charging stations every 50 miles (80 km).

Delaware Department of Natural Resources and Environmental Control (DNREC) also offers rebates to lower the cost of electric charging stations that can be installed at multi-family or public places.

== Potential policy changes ==
As of April 2023, the Delaware Department of Natural Resources and Environmental Control (DNREC) is considering whether or not to implement the Advanced Clear Car II standards developed by California. Delaware would be the 15th state to adopt these principles, and would join a growing list of states attempting to provide an increasing percentage of zero-emission vehicles to state vehicle dealerships, with the plan to have zero emission-based vehicles by the year 2035.

== By county ==
=== Kent ===
As of July 2022, there were 42 battery electric vehicles and 47 plug-in hybrid vehicles registered in Kent County.

=== New Castle ===
In October 2021, New Castle County enacted an ordinance requiring 10% of parking spaces in new residential buildings constructed to be equipped with EV charging infrastructure.

=== Sussex ===
The Seaford municipal government announced the city's first public charging station in January 2022.
