= Delaware Depository =

- Company type: Private
- Industry: Precious Metal
- Founded: 1999
- Headquarters: 3601 N Market Street, Wilmington, DE 19802
- Services: Storage, Logistics, Security
- Website: www.delawaredepository.com

Delaware Depository is a privately held precious metals custody and distribution center founded in 1999. Located in Wilmington, Delaware, Delaware Depository provides precious metals bullion custody, safekeeping, and distribution services for IRA custodians, financial institutions, broker-dealers, refiners, and individual investors. Customers have the option of storing bullion in either Wilmington, DE, Aston, PA, Boulder City, NV, Spring Valley, NV or internationally, in Canada or Switzerland.

Delaware Depository is a Licensed Depository of CME Group, Inc. (Comex and Nymex Divisions) for gold, silver, platinum, and palladium bullion. Delaware Depository applied for and obtained a no-action letter from the Securities Exchange Commission (SEC) which authorizes it to provide gold and silver bullion custody and safekeeping for mutual funds and other 1940 Act funds.

Delaware Depository adheres to “defense in depth” security controls and procedures to protect customer assets from theft or damage. This includes fortified physical structures and UL-rated vaults, 24/7 video surveillance, motion, sound, and vibration detection, electronic security, logical controls, and dual controls/segregation of duties internal controls. An external auditor conducts SSAE-18 SOC-1 audits of Delaware Depository's security controls and procedures. Customer assets and recorded holdings are continuously reconciled and audited by internal and external auditors. Delaware Depository's vault staff utilizes various manual and mechanical methods of counterfeit detection to mitigate risk associated with counterfeit or tainted bullion products.

A key benefit to storing physical bullion assets in Wilmington, Delaware is that this geographic location has not been impacted by terrorist attacks, weather-related disasters, or geopolitical events that threaten to disrupt a bullion depository's security and ongoing operations. Delaware Depository maintains a disaster recovery center to restore operations and provide continuity of services in the event of a major business interruption.

Delaware Depository developed the IRA Gateway™, an internet-based portal featuring a messaging system, document repository, and escrow service that enables IRA custodians and bullion dealers to efficiently execute and settle purchases and sales of IRA-invested bullion products.
