= Delaware Student Testing Program =

Standardized test in Delaware, United States

- Acronym: DSTP
- Type: Test
- Skills tested: Progress towards the Delaware Content Standards
- Offered: Grades 2-11
- Regions: Delaware

The Delaware Student Testing Program (DSTP) is a test designed to measure progress towards the Delaware Content Standards. Students are tested in grades 2–10 in reading and mathematics, grades 5, 8, and 10 in writing, and grades 4, 6, 8, and 11 in science and social studies.

The program has been criticized by parents for being ineffective and distorted.
