= Caesar Rodney Institute =

American think tank

- Established: 2008
- Chair: Michelle F. Parsons
- Budget: Revenue: $463,000; Expenses: $549,000 (FYE December 2024)
- Address: 420 Corporate Blvd. Newark, DE 19702
- Location: Delaware
- Coordinates: 39.6176°N 75.7576°W
- Interactive map of Caesar Rodney Institute
- Website: www.caesarrodney.org

The Caesar Rodney Institute (CRI) is a conservative nonprofit Delaware-based think tank that researches economic issues such as jobs, education, energy, and healthcare.

In 2024, CRI filed a lawsuit against the Delaware Department of Natural Resources and Environmental Control (DNREC) over plans to bring a power line ashore from a proposed offshore wind project. The lawsuit argues that DNREC lacks the authority to grant permits to US Wind to bring transmission lines ashore at a Delaware state park. CRI argues that US Wind violated proper permitting procedures for the offshore wind project and did not allow sufficient time for public comment. Environmental and tourism concerns have been raised regarding the project.Fishermen and clammers have expressed concerns about their livelihoods being at risk. The proposed project would deliver wind energy to Maryland. David Stevenson, CRI's policy director, said "Anything that comes out of this has been promised correctly to Maryland. So why are we gonna take the hit for this in Delaware? There's no reason for it."

In multiple states, CRI also opposes other wind power projects.
