= Del-One Federal Credit Union =

American credit union in Dover, Delaware

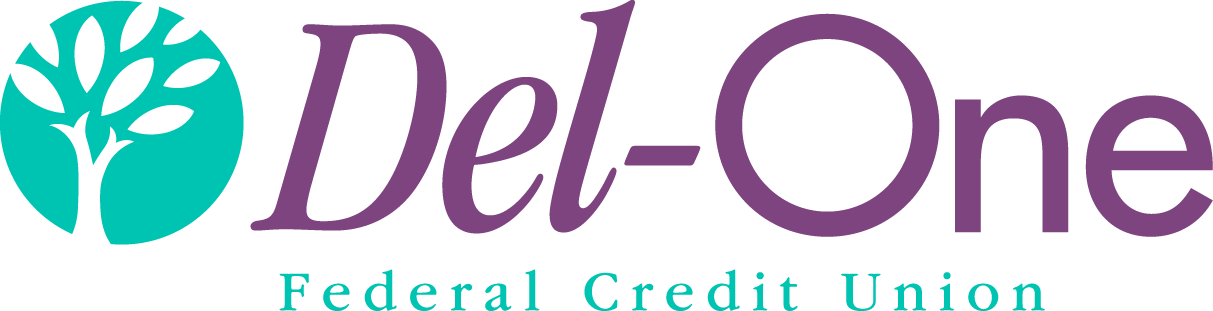
- Formerly: Delaware Federal Credit Union (1995), Delaware State Employees Federal Credit Union (1967), Delaware Highway Federal Credit Union (1960)
- Type: Credit union
- Industry: Financial services
- Founded: 1960
- Headquarters: Dover, Delaware, United States
- Number of locations: 11 branches (2020)
- Key people: Steve Smith, Chair; Dan McCarthy, CEO
- Products: Savings; checking; consumer loans; mortgages; credit cards; online banking
- Total assets: ▲US$ 520M (2020)
- Members: 72,000 (2020)
- Number of employees: 571 (2019)
- Website: del-one.org

Del-One Federal Credit Union (formerly Delaware Federal Credit Union) is a credit union headquartered in Dover, Delaware. Del-One Federal Credit Union was officially chartered in 1960. Del-One is the largest credit union in Delaware. As of March 2020, Del-One had over $520 million in assets, serving over 72,000 members with 11 branches.

== Mergers ==
In 1996, Del-One Federal Credit Union merged with American Mirrex Federal Credit Union.

In 1999, Del-One Federal Credit Union merged with Delaware Transit Employees Federal Credit Union.

In 2008, Del-One Federal Credit Union merged with Department of Labor Federal Credit Union.

In 2013, Del-One Federal Credit Union merged with Seaford Federal Credit Union.

In 2015, Del-One Federal Credit Union merged with U-DEL Federal Credit Union, and Newport Site Employees Federal Credit Union.

In 2017, Del-One Federal Credit Union merged with ICI America Federal Credit Union, established in 1973.

In 2026, Del-One Federal Credit Union merged with Louviers Federal Credit Union.

== Awards ==
- Forbes – Awarded Best-in-State Credit Union from Forbes' annual list of America's best credit unions in each state 2020 (state of Delaware).
- Readers Choice – Delaware's Favorite Credit Union in the Wilmington News Journal Reader's Choice Awards for 2012, 2013, 2014, 2015, 2016, 2017, and 2018.
- Top Workplace – Awarded as a Top Workplace from the Wilmington News Journal in 2013, 2014, 2015, 2016, 2017, and 2018.
