= St. Mary's College (Delaware) =

Former college in Wilmington, Delaware

St. Mary's College was a Roman Catholic college in Delaware from 1841 until 1866.

St. Mary's College was founded in Wilmington, Delaware, in 1841 by Patrick Reilly. It was incorporated on January 29, 1847, by an act of the state of Delaware. Its enrollment peaked at 120 students in 1857. Its fortunes declined during the American Civil War and it closed in 1866.

== Sources ==
- Catholic Encyclopedia article on Delaware
