= Delaware County =

Delaware County is the name of six counties in the United States:

- Delaware County, Indiana
- Delaware County, Iowa
- Delaware County, New York
- Delaware County, Ohio
- Delaware County, Oklahoma
- Delaware County, Pennsylvania
