= Delaware Intercorp =

- Company type: Private
- Industry: Incorporation
- Founded: 1996
- Headquarters: Newark, Delaware
- Key people: CEO

Delaware Intercorp is an American registered agent headquartered in Delaware.

The company provides incorporation, corporate documentation solutions along with entity support services and was the top-ranked Delaware Incorporator on the 2007 Delaware Business Ledger Book of Lists. Aided by Delaware law, the state is a corporate haven with over 50% of U.S. publicly traded corporations. In addition, 60% of the Fortune 500 companies are incorporated in that state. The company's president is Larry D. Sullivan, Esquire.

Delaware Intercorp's roots started in 1992 with its predecessor company. In 1996, Delaware Intercorp, Inc. started with providing incorporation and registered agent services and was located on North Dupont Highway in New Castle, Delaware. In 2000, Delaware Intercorp moved to its current location in Newark. In 2009, Delaware Intercorp added UCC Copy Requests to its list of services available, while in 2010, the company began offering Corporate Health Check Services for clients and extended their previous Corporate Presence Package to include Bank Deposit Courier Service. In 2011, the company added Delaware Boat Registration services.
