= Wesleyan Female College (Wilmington) =

- Wesleyan Female Collegiate Institute
- Former names: Wesleyan Female Seminary; Wesleyan College

General information
- Type: Women's college
- Location: Wilmington, Delaware, U.S.
- Coordinates: 39.74162°N 75.54821°W
- Opened: 1837

Wesleyan Female College of Wilmington, Delaware, USA, was a college for women that operated from 1837 to 1885.

Reverend Solomon Prettyman founded the institution in 1837 as the Wesleyan Female Seminary, with the support of the Philadelphia and Baltimore Conferences of the Methodist Church. The school started on Market Street in 1837, moved to a new building at Ninth Street and Market Street in 1838, and built a building of its own in 1839 on French Street near Sixth Street. The general location of the school is now occupied by One Alico Plaza.

In 1841, the school was chartered under the name of "Wesleyan Female Collegiate Institute". By 1842, it had 111 students and nine instructors. Some complained about the growing intellectual rigor of the school. For example, an 1847 editorial in The Delaware Gazette noted the many courses in academic subjects but "heard nothing of the class upon making bread, puddings, and pies..." A literary magazine called The Female Student and Young Ladies Chronicle was published by the school from 1844 to 1849.

In 1851, after a period of decline, the board of trustees took over control from Prettyman for the Methodist Episcopal Church. The school was renamed the "Wesleyan Female College" in 1855.

Enrollment started to decline during the 1870s, probably due in part to the opening of the Wilmington Conference Academy, a secondary school which went co-educational in 1874. By 1879, enrollment had dropped to 66 students. A smallpox outbreak also decreased enrollment in 1880. Between 1855 and 1881, the school had 228 graduates.

In 1882, the college was sold at a sheriff's sale to William Bright, who renamed it Wesleyan College and operated it as a non-sectarian school.

Despite support from local prominent businessmen, the school closed in 1885. One of its three buildings became the Central Hotel.

After its closing, no college option for women existed in Delaware until the Women's College of Delaware (now part of the University of Delaware} opened in 1914.

== Presidents ==
- Solomon Prettyman (1837–51)
- T.E. Sundler (1851–52)
- George Loomis (1852–57) (later president of Allegheny College)
- Lafayette C. Loomis (1857–58)
- John Wilson (1858–78)
- James M. Williams (1878–82)
- John Wilson (1882–85)

== Notable alumnae ==
- Josephine White deLacour (1849–1929), class of 1875, one of the first women physicians in Delaware
- Evalyn France (1855–1927), class of 1873, Maryland banker and philanthropist
- Mary Jones (1828–1908), class of 1845, physician
- Beulah Woolston (1828–1886), pioneering missionary teacher in China
