= Delaware Township =

Delaware Township may refer to:

== Indiana ==
- Delaware Township, Delaware County, Indiana
- Delaware Township, Hamilton County, Indiana
- Delaware Township, Ripley County, Indiana

== Iowa ==
- Delaware Township, Sac County, Iowa
- Delaware Township, Delaware County, Iowa
- Delaware Township, Polk County, Iowa

== Michigan ==
- Delaware Township, Michigan

== Minnesota ==
- Delaware Township, Grant County, Minnesota

== New Jersey ==
- Delaware Township, Camden County, New Jersey, now Cherry Hill Township
- Delaware Township, Hunterdon County, New Jersey

== Ohio ==
- Delaware Township, Defiance County, Ohio
- Delaware Township, Delaware County, Ohio
- Delaware Township, Hancock County, Ohio

== Pennsylvania ==
- Delaware Township, Juniata County, Pennsylvania
- Delaware Township, Mercer County, Pennsylvania
- Delaware Township, Northumberland County, Pennsylvania
- Delaware Township, Philadelphia County, Pennsylvania, defunct
- Delaware Township, Pike County, Pennsylvania
