= Grant & Eisenhofer =

American law firm

Grant & Eisenhofer P.A.
- Headquarters: Wilmington, Delaware
- No. of offices: 4
- No. of attorneys: 75
- No. of employees: 150
- Date founded: 1997
- Founders: Stuart M. Grant and Jay W. Eisenhofer
- Company type: Legal services
- Website: https://www.gelaw.com

Grant & Eisenhofer P.A. (also known as G&E) is an American plaintiffs' law firm. It is headquartered in Wilmington, Delaware.

== History ==
The founding partners commenced their legal careers as litigators in Skadden Arps Slate Meagher & Flom's Wilmington office. They left Skadden together to join Philadelphia-based law firm Blank Rome Comisky & McCauley. During their time there, Grant and Eisenhofer acted as resident litigation partners.

In 1997, they founded Grant & Eisenhofer P.A. Eisenhofer has stated that they decided to switch from corporate defense to exclusively representing plaintiffs because "they wanted to be on the side of the good guys."

Stuart Grant argued the provisions of the PSLRA which allowed an institutional investor to act as lead plaintiff in securities class action cases. In this case, Gluck et al. v. Cellstar, The State of Wisconsin Investment Board was lead plaintiff and G&E was appointed lead counsel. The class recovered 56% of their losses. In 2000, the Kansas Public Employees Retirement System filed a suit against Digex, in which G&E was lead counsel for the plaintiff. The case settled in 2001 for $420 million. In 2004, Grant & Eisenhofer was recognized by Pensions & Investments magazine for "a hallmark in corporate governance" regarding the settlement in which HealthSouth's board of directors was completely replaced. Firm partners Jay Eisenhofer and Michael Barry co-authored the Shareholder Activism Handbook in 2005. The handbook is a guide for shareholders on matters relating to shareholder activism.

In 2014, the firm was reported to have been a major donor to state attorneys general associations, candidates, state party committees, and attorneys general running for governor.
