= Delaware, Maryland and Virginia Railroad =

The Delaware, Maryland, and Virginia Railroad (DMVR) is a defunct American railroad that operated passenger service from Broad Street Station in Philadelphia, Pennsylvania to Franklin City, Virginia in the late 19th Century and most of the 20th Century. At the latter city, steamship connections could be made to Chincoteague, Virginia on the Atlantic Ocean-side exterior islands.

It was formed from the merger of three railroads on the Delmarva Peninsula. The Pennsylvania Railroad (PRR) took control of it following a bankruptcy. It passed to Penn Central and was then broken up among multiple owners following Penn Central's bankruptcy.

Much of it is still in operation, but most of the branch towards Rehoboth has been turned into a trail and the line south of Snow Hill was abandoned in 1956.

== History ==
The railroad was formed in 1883 through a consolidation of the Junction and Breakwater Railroad, the Breakwater and Frankford Railroad and the Worcester Railroad.

The Junction and Breakwater Railroad (J&B) was a 38 mile long railroad, built between 1858 and 1878 that ran between Harrington, Delaware and Lewes with a spur to Rehoboth Beach, Delaware.

The Breakwater & Frankford Railroad (B&F) built a connection, which opened on May 22, 1874, to the J&B at Georgetown that ran from Georgetown to the Maryland line at Selbyville.

By 1876, the Worcester Railroad had built an extension of the B&F line to Franklin City, Virginia and Chincoteague Bay for the purpose of transporting oysters and other shellfish to Philadelphia.

All three of these lines were owned by Old Dominion Steamship.

=== Pennsylvania Railroad Control ===
In March 1891, the DMVR approached default on two mortgages totaling $600,000 and so the Philadelphia, Wilmington and Baltimore Railroad (PW&BR) took control of the company. The Delaware General Assembly met with DMVR directors and those of the PW&BR in order to avoid the default and keep the rail lines open. DMVR shareholders remained minority owners of the line until 1919, when they were unable to meet financial obligations, and the minority shares were sold to the Pennsylvania Railroad.

By the 1910s the Pennsylvania Railroad had leased out or purchased the railroad, appearing on the Pennsylvania Railroad tables of the PRR section of the Official Guide of the Railways of North America. By the end of the 1920s the line was among those rail lines throughout the Delmarva Peninsula that the PRR fully acquired.

In 1934 the DMVR bought the Milton Industrial Track, part of the Queen Anne's Railroad between Ellendale to Milton after the Queen Anne's went bankrupt.

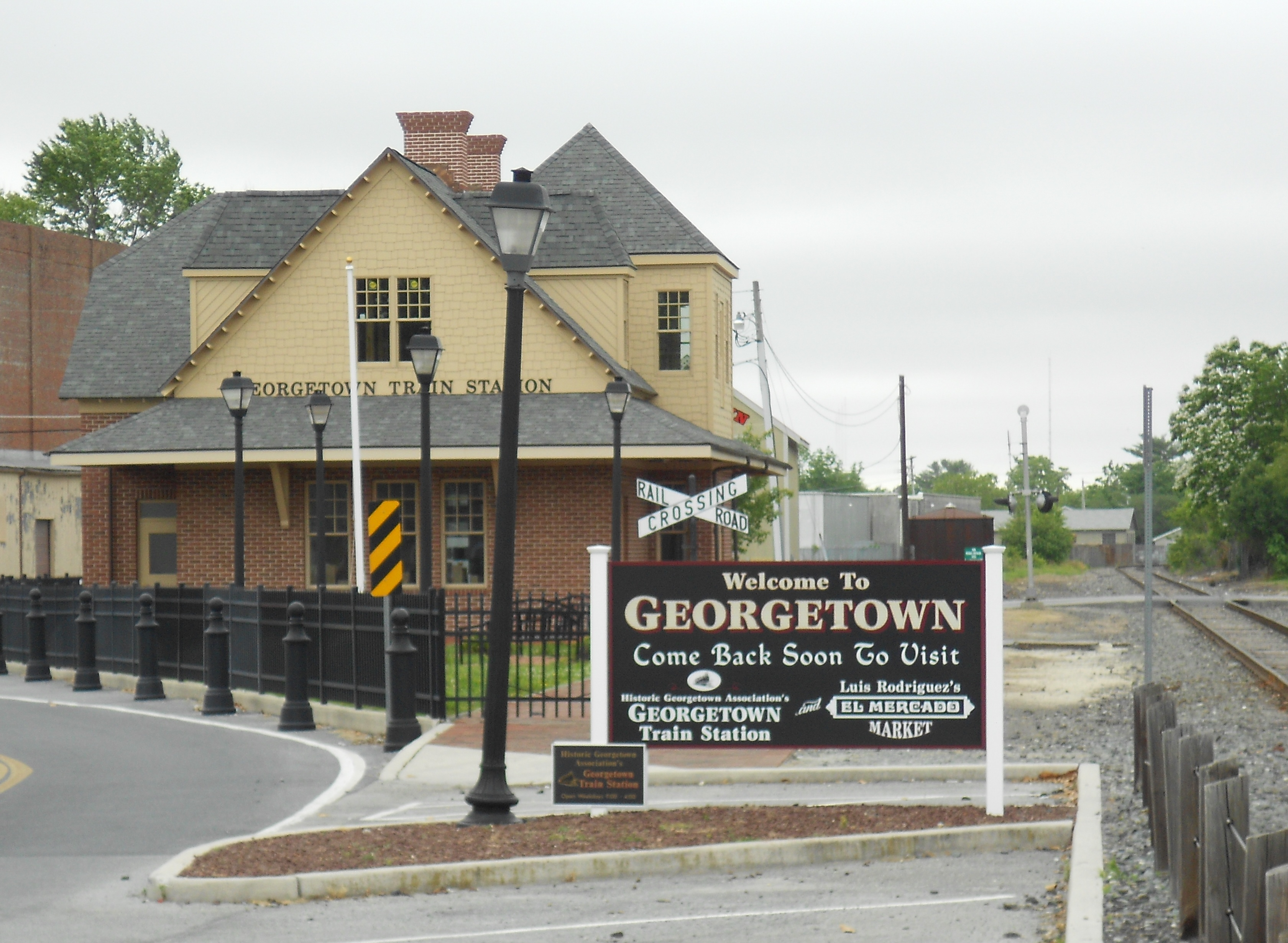
The railroad station in Georgetown, Delaware

The Pennsylvania Railroad passenger trains operated along the route until the late 1940s, stopping at towns just a few miles inland from resort towns on the eastern coast of the Delmarva Peninsula. Frequency along the route dwindled from three trains in each direction in the early 1910s to one train a day in each direction in 1941.

Service across the Lewes and Rehoboth Canal in Rehoboth was eliminated in the 1940's.

Passenger service along the lines was eliminated by 1949.

In 1955 the DMVR was merged into the PW&B and ceased to exist.

== Legacy ==
In 1956, the PRR abandoned the tracks in Virginia.

In 1968, the PRR and its longtime rival New York Central Railroad merged to form the Penn Central Railroad and the former DMVR became part of that entity. Penn Central went bankrupt and all of its assets became part of U.S. Rail and then Conrail.

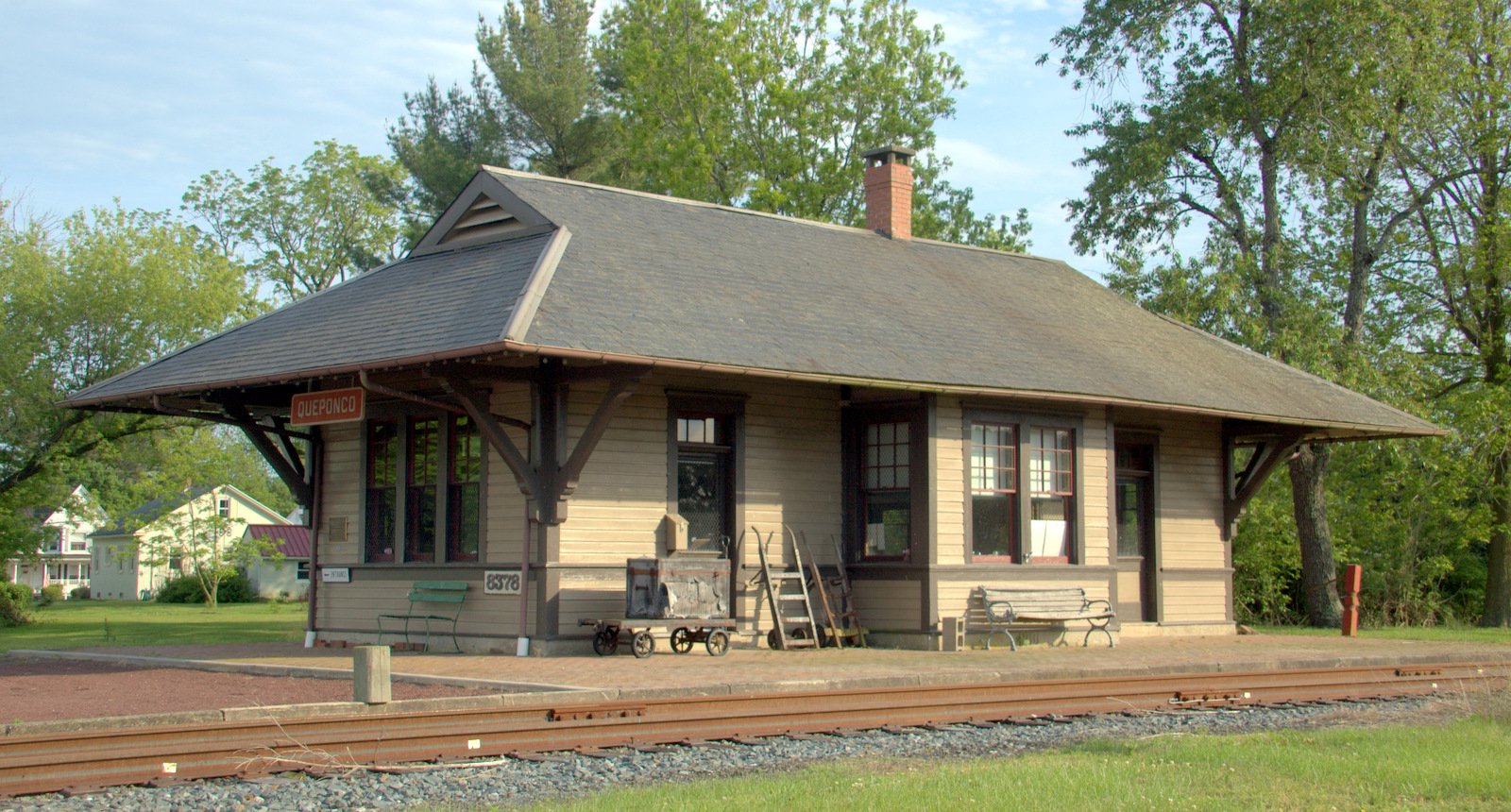
Queponco Railway Station in Newark, MD

Eventually the DMVR trackage was broken up into four pieces: The Delmarva Secondary Line (owned by Norfolk Southern and operated by Delmarva Central Railroad), the Milton Industrial Track and the Lewes Industrial Track (both owned by DelDOT and operated by the Delmarva Central) and the Snow Hill Branch Line (owned and operated by MDDE). All but the portion of the Lewes Industrial Track east of Harbeson, DE are still in operation.

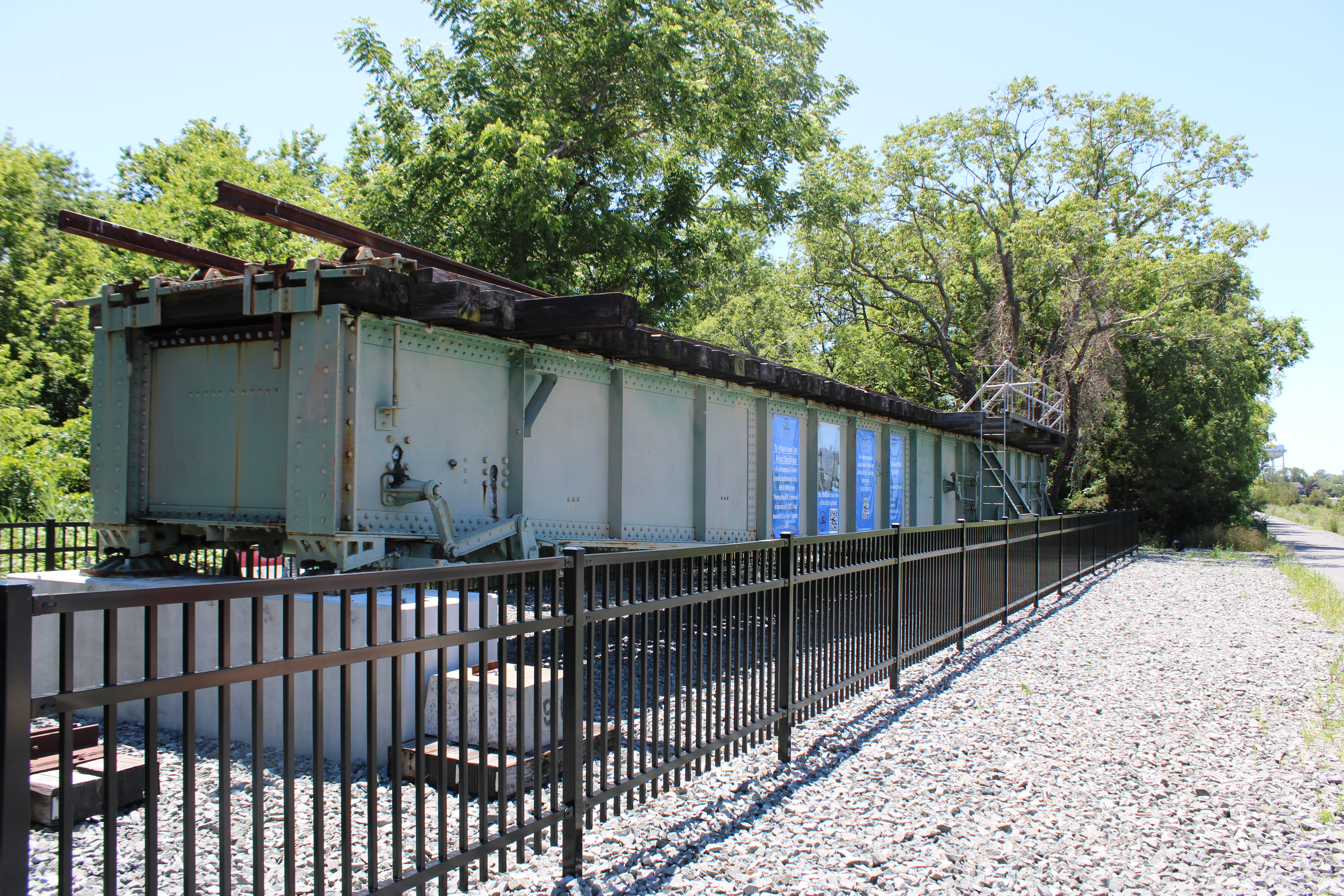
The preserved canal swing bridge along the trail

The historic Milford train station is still in use, but as office space.

The abandoned right-of-way from Fischer Road on the east side of Harbeson to just west of Cape Henlopen State Park in Lewes was converted into the Lewes-Georgetown Trail and there are plans to extend it west to the end of the track in Harbeson.

The Harbeson Railroad Station privy, built in 1870, was donated to the Lewes Historical Society and moved to their campus by 2022.

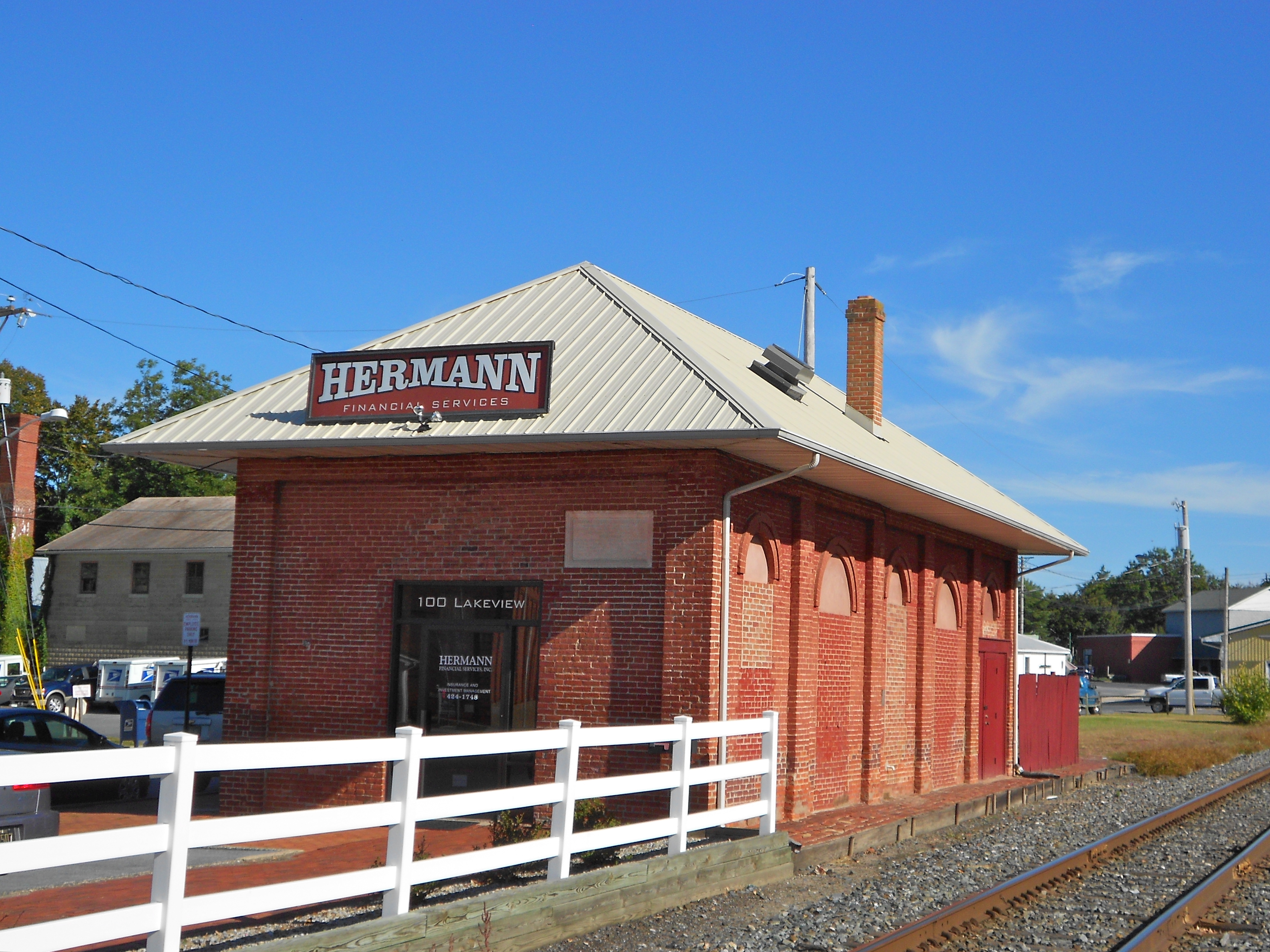
Milford Railroad Station listed on the NRHP on January 7, 1983.

The old Lewes-Rehoboth Canal bridge, and the date stone from the west abutment, are on permanent display along the Lewes-Georgetown Trail at American Legion Road in Lewes. The bridge was a hand-cranked swing bridge that was originally built in 1869 and modernized by PRR in 1916. The bridge was reconstructed in 1997. After DelDot decided it was unsafe in 2016, leading to the rail line east of the canal being shut down, it was removed on Feb. 15, 2022 and the canal was restored over the next year.

Some of the abandoned right-of-way from Lewes to Rehoboth Beach is used for the Junction and Breakwater Trail.

The Rehoboth Beach Train Station which was built in the late 1800s currently serves as Rehoboth Beach-Dewey Beach Chamber of Commerce and Visitors Center. It was in service until the 1920s. After that it served as offices, small shops and a restaurant until it was sold in 1950. It was donated to the city and the Rehoboth Railroad Station Preservation Society and moved to its present location at 501 Rehoboth Avenue in 1987.

From Georgetown to Snow Hill several old stations remain including the one at Queponco Road in Newark, DE, which is now a museum.

The right-of-way from Snow Hill, MD to Franklin City, MD was abandoned and all the tracks have been removed. The stations at Snow Hill and Girdletree, MD; the depot at Franklin City and a couple of vintage RR crossing signs in Girdletree where the line used to be are the only remnants of the section south of Snow Hill. In 2020, the Federal Government announced that it wanted the Franklin City Depot removed and began looking for people to take it.

== Route ==
The noteworthy towns along the route, south of Wilmington, Delaware consisted of:

- Harrington, Delaware
- Ellendale
- Georgetown
- Lewes
- Rehoboth
- Selbyville
- Berlin, Maryland
- Snow Hill
- Franklin City, Virginia
