= Junction and Breakwater Railroad =

Former railroad in Delaware, US

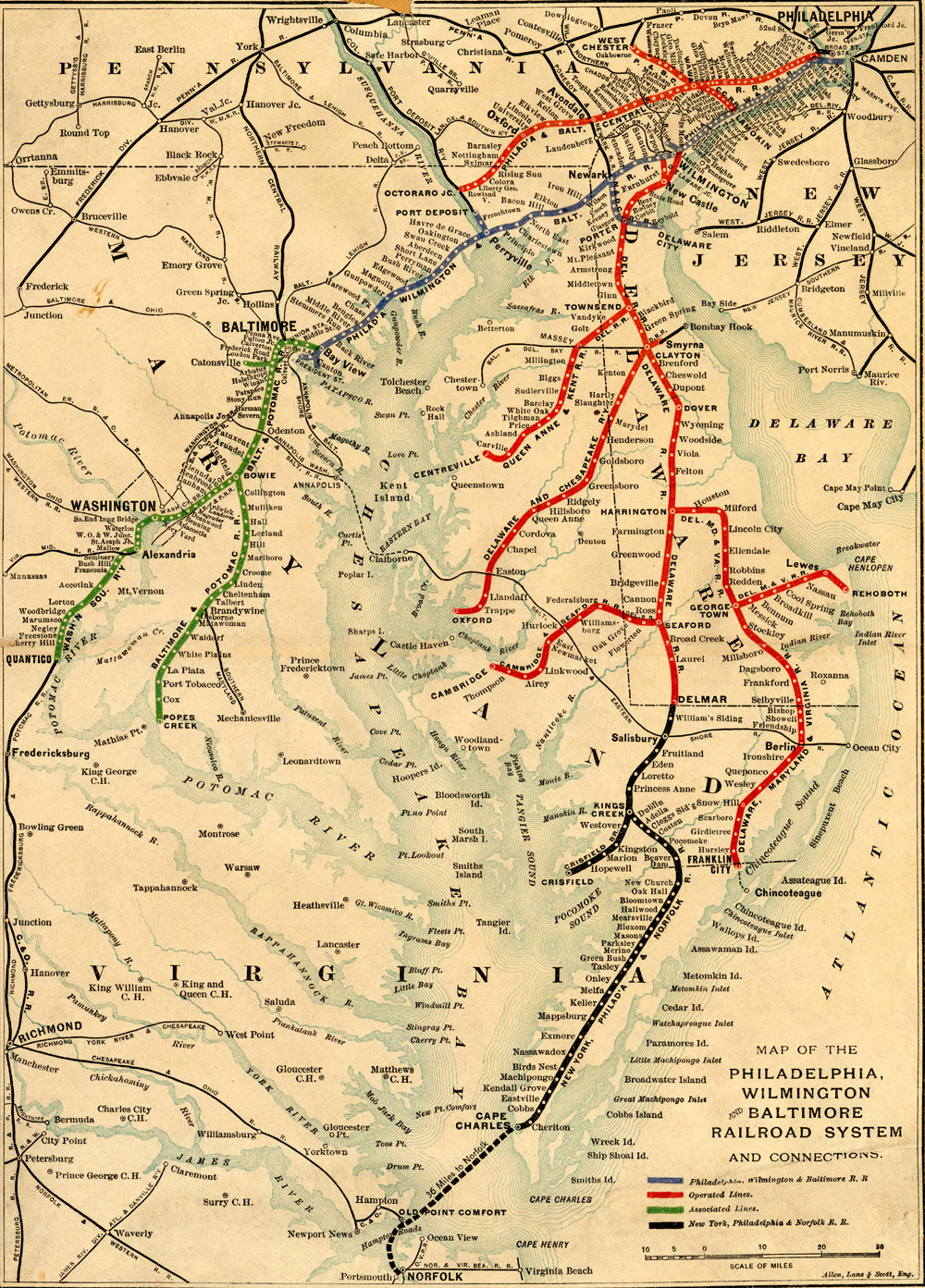
- An early 1890s map of the Philadelphia, Wilmington & Baltimore Railroad showing the Junction and Breakwater Railroad line

Overview
- Headquarters: Milford, Delaware
- Locale: Delaware, U.S.
- Dates of operation: 1859–1883
- Successor: Delaware, Maryland and Virginia Railroad

Technical
- Track gauge: 4 ft 8 1/2 in (1,435 mm) standard gauge
- Length: 38 miles (61 km)

The Junction and Breakwater Railroad was a 38 mile long railroad that ran between Harrington, Delaware and Lewes with a spur to Rehoboth Beach, Delaware during the late 19th Century. It passed through Milford, Ellendale and Georgetown. In 1883, it merged with the Breakwater and Frankford Railroad and the Worcester Railroad to become the Delaware, Maryland and Virginia Railroad which was eventually purchased by the Pennsylvania Railroad.

Part of the line remains in use and others have been abandoned, with parts converted into trail.

== History ==
The Junction & Breakwater Railroad (J&B) was chartered in 1857 to operate in conjunction with steamship service between the Delmarva Peninsula and New York City. In 1858, with aid from the state of Delaware, work began from a "junction" with the Delaware Railroad in Clark's Corner, DE to Milford, DE, and the last spike was driven by former Governor Peter F. Causey on August 25, 1859. The section formally opened on September 7, 1859, with the Philadelphia, Wilmington and Baltimore Railroad leased to use it. At the end of the year, Clark's Corner was renamed Harrington in honor of Samuel Maxwell Harrington, a former judge.

Work was stalled by the Civil War but resumed in 1867 and the line was completed to Lewes and the Delaware Breakwater, via Georgetown, in 1869 with stations at each end as well as stations in Cool Spring, Harbeson (later called Broadkill) and Nassau.

In early 1874, the Breakwater and Frankford Railroad (B&F) (sometimes Frankford and Breakwater) began work on a rail line that ran south from Georgetown, where it connected to the J&B, to Frankford, Delaware near the Maryland state line. In July of that year, when work was underway on the B&F, the Old Dominion Steamship Company purchased the J&B and in early 1875 it bough the B&F and the Worcester Railroad. The B&F began operation in November.

In 1875, the B&F, with help from its new owners, extended their line south to Berlin, Maryland from Selbyville and the Worcester extended theirs south to Franklin City, VA. The former was completed in June 1875 and running by July and the later in May 1876. This created a connection to the Wicomico and Pocomoke Railroad in Berlin and on to Snow Hill, Maryland, Franklin City and to Chincoteague by steamer.

The J&B opened a 5-mile extension to Rehoboth in 1878 to provide service to the Rehoboth Beach Camp Meeting Association of the Methodist Episcopal Church. In Rehoboth it eventually built connections to canneries along the Lewes and Rehoboth Canal and factories along Laurel Street; a passenger station on Rehoboth Avenue, and a wye that connected to Henlopen Junction on the west side of the canal.

In 1881, the Pennsylvania Railroad purchased the Philadelphia, Wilmington and Baltimore Railroad and it appeared they would purchase the J&B and its branches to consolidate all the railroads on the peninsula. Instead work began in 1882 and completed in 1883 to consolidate the J&B, the B&F and the Worcester to form the Delaware, Maryland and Virginia Railroad (DMVR).

== Legacy ==
Old Dominion Steamship sold the DMVR to the PW&B, and thus the Pennsylvania Railroad (PRR) system, in 1885 and ended its Lewes to New York Steamship Line. Delaware still owned the mortgages on the J&B and B&F dating back to 1873 and in 1891 the PW&B renegotiated the $200,000 mortgage which it continued to pay interest on for years. In 1955 the DMVR was merged into the PW&B.

The DMVR remained part of the Pennsylvania Railroad system until it became Penn Central. Following the bankruptcy of Penn Central, it became part of Conrail. Part of the old J&B was then sold to Norfolk Southern and another part to the state of Delaware.

== Remnants ==
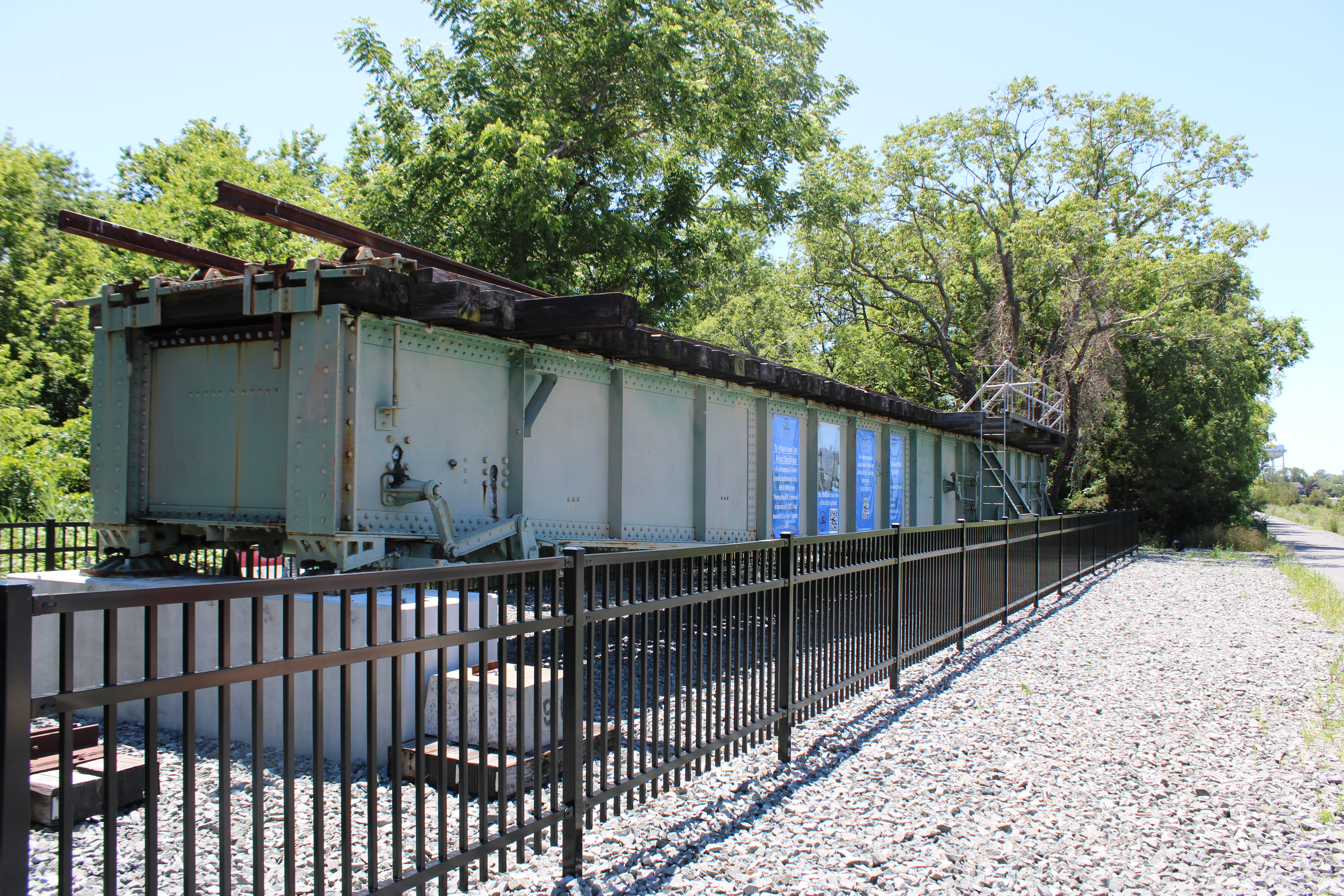
The preserved canal swing bridge along the trail

The line now has several owners and operators. Between Harrington and Georgetown it is owned and operated by Norfolk Southern as part of the Indian River Secondary. The line between Georgetown and Lewes is owned the state of Delaware and the section of it from Georgetown to Harbeson is operated by the Delmarva Central Railroad as the Lewes Running Track. The rest of the line to Lewes and the line to Rehoboth have been abandoned.

The historic Milford train station is still in use, but as office space.

The abandoned right-of-way from Fischer Road on the east side of Harbeson to just west of Cape Henlopen State Park in Lewes was converted into the Lewes-Georgetown Trail and there are plans to extend it west to the end of the track in Harbeson.

The Harbeson Railroad Station privy, built in 1870, was donated to the Lewes Historical Society and moved to their campus by 2022.

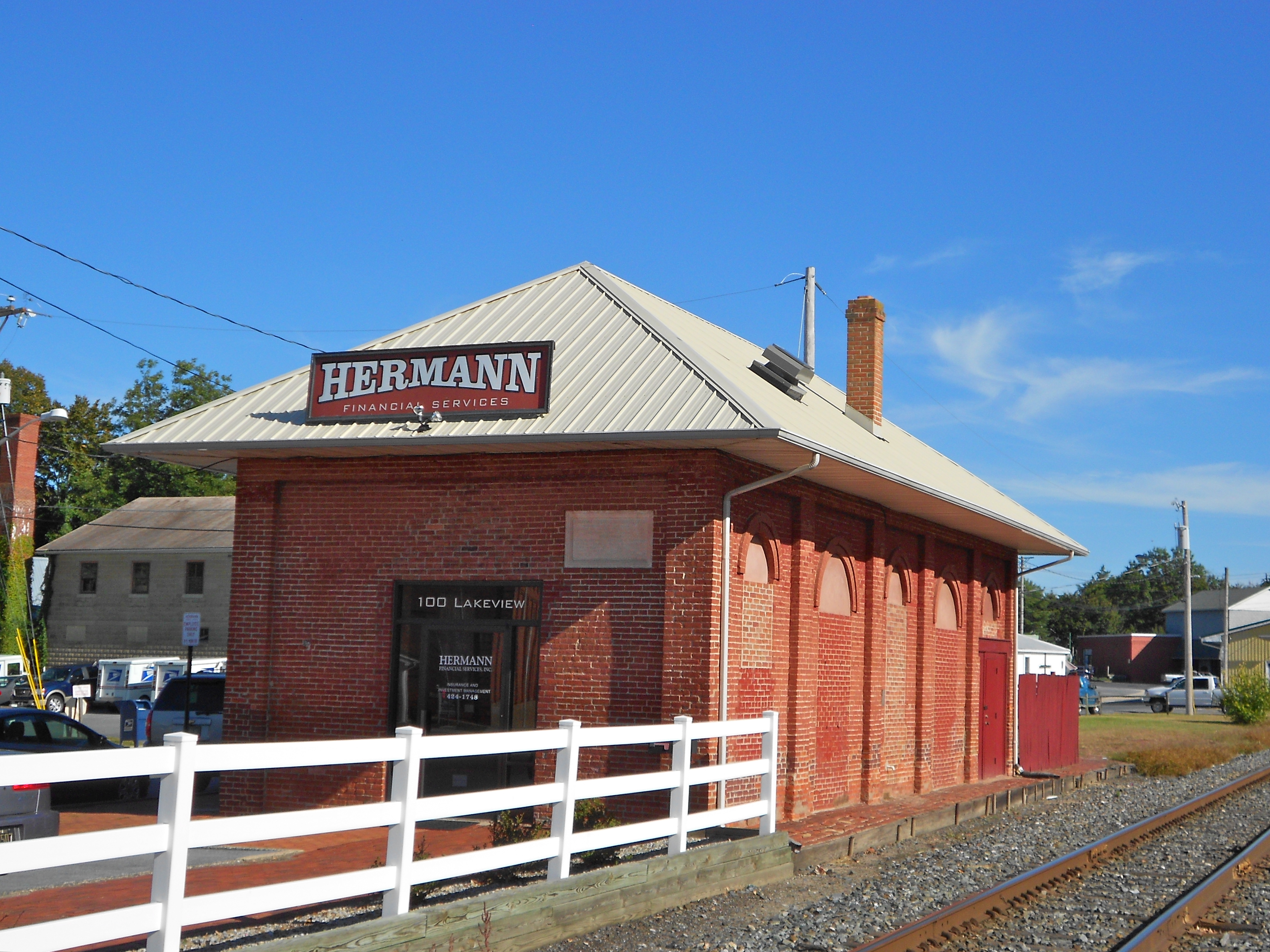
Milford Railroad Station listed on the NRHP on January 7, 1983.

The old Lewes-Rehoboth Canal bridge, and the date stone from the west abutment, are on permanent display along the Lewes-Georgetown Trail at American Legion Road in Lewes. The bridge was a hand-cranked swing bridge that was originally built in 1869 and modernized by PRR in 1916. The bridge was reconstructed in 1997. After DelDot decided it was unsafe in 2016, leading to the rail line east of the canal being shut down, it was removed on Feb. 15, 2022 and the canal was restored over the next year.

Some of the abandoned right-of-way from Lewes to Rehoboth Beach is used for the Junction and Breakwater Trail.

The Rehoboth Beach Train Station which was built in the late 1800s currently serves as Rehoboth Beach-Dewey Beach Chamber of Commerce and Visitors Center. It was in service until the 1920s. After that it served as offices, small shops and a restaurant until it was sold in 1950. It was donated to the city and the Rehoboth Railroad Station Preservation Society and moved to its present location at 501 Rehoboth Avenue in 1987.
