= Worcester Railroad =

Former railroad in Delaware, US

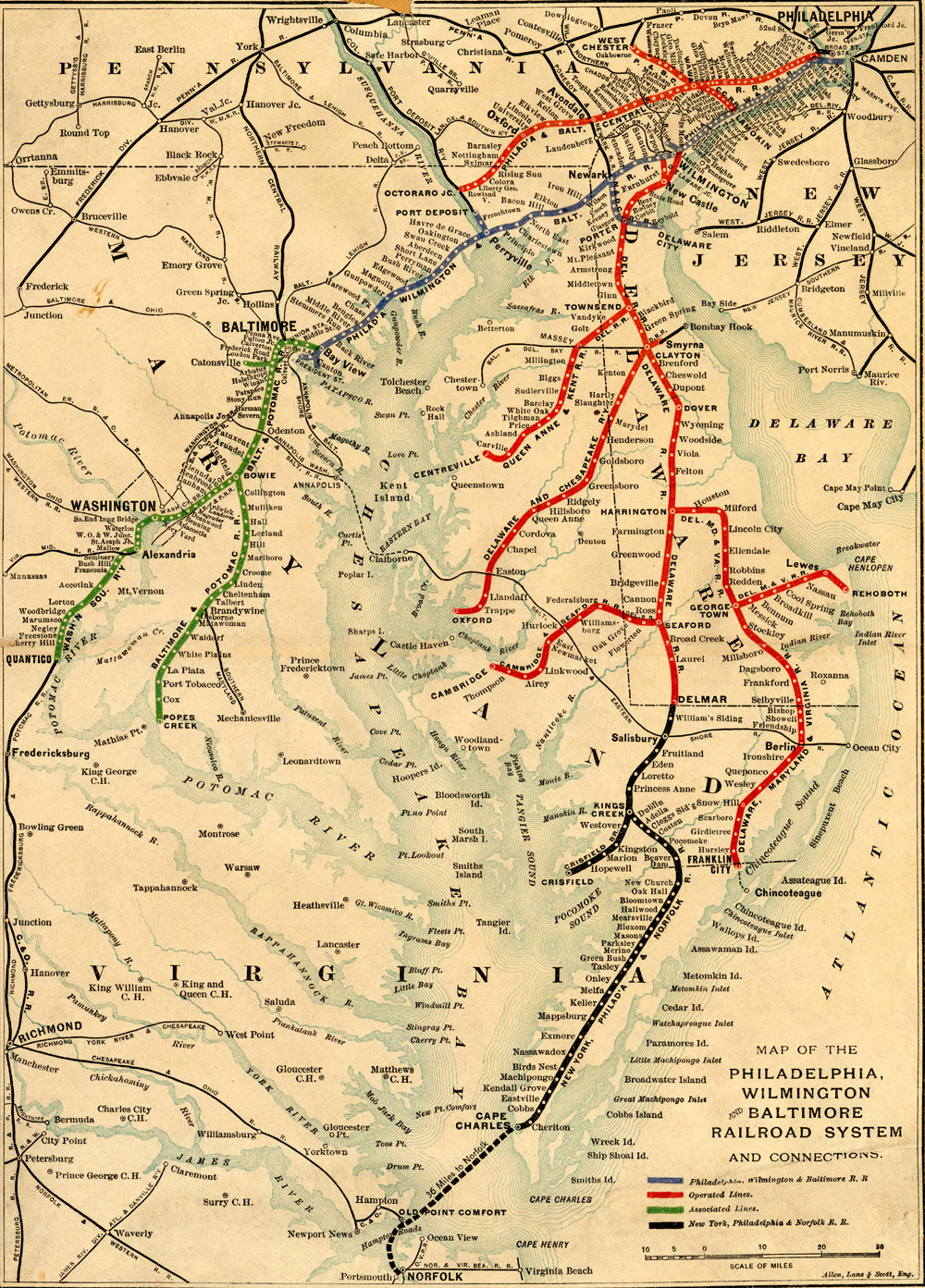
- An early 1890s map of the Philadelphia, Wilmington & Baltimore Railroad showing the Worcester Railroad line

Overview
- Stations called at: Showell's, Berlin, Queponco, Wesley, Snow Hill, Girdletree, Stockon, Franklin City
- Headquarters: Snow Hill, Maryland
- Key people: George S. Richardson
- Locale: Worcester County, Maryland; Accomack County, Virginia; Sussex County, Delaware
- Dates of operation: 1875–1883
- Successor: Delaware, Maryland and Virginia Railroad

Technical
- Track gauge: 4 ft 8 1/2 in (1,435 mm) standard gauge
- Length: 36 miles (58 km)

The Worcester Railroad was a 36 mile long railroad that ran between Selbyville, Delaware and Franklin City, Virginia during the late 19th Century. It passed through Berlin, Maryland and Snow Hill, Maryland. In 1883, it merged with the Breakwater and Frankford Railroad and the Junction and Breakwater Railroad to become the Delaware, Maryland and Virginia Railroad which was eventually purchased by the Pennsylvania Railroad.

The line from Selbyville to Snow Hill remains in use, while the line south of Snow Hill has been abandoned.

== History ==
The Worcester Railroad (WR) was incorporated in 1853 by the state of Maryland to run a railroad from a point on the Virginia State line, to run through Worcester county to the Delaware State line, to connect with any road or roads, which might be built running through the Virginia counties of Accomack and Northampton and Delaware's Sussex county. In 1856 it was authorized to consolidate with several other railroads as part of a plan to create an air line between New York City and Norfolk, Virginia.

In 1868, the Wicomico and Pocomoke Railroad (W&P) completed a line from Salisbury, Maryland to Berlin which created an added impetus to build the railroad through Worcester County.

The company was organized in July 1869 and work began shortly thereafter on the first 14 mile long segment between Snow Hill and Berlin. It was completed in 1872 and the W&P operated trains on it.

In January of 1875 Old Dominion Steamship, which had bought the J&B in 1874, purchased the Worcester Railroad, along with the B&F, with plans to create a line from Georgetown, DE to the Chesapeake Bay coast in Virginia. In March, they were granted permission by Virginia to extend the line to Chincoteague Bay. Old Dominion began extending the B&F south in March and the Worcester south in April. The line between Frankford and Berlin was completed in June of 1875 and trains were running on the tracks by July. By early 1876 trains were running as far south as Stockton, Maryland. In May they started running to Franklin City, where they connected to Chincoteague by steamer.

In 1881, the Pennsylvania Railroad purchased the Philadelphia, Wilmington and Baltimore Railroad and it appeared they would purchase all the railroads on the peninsula. Instead in 1882 the shareholders began the process of consolidating the J&B, the B&F and the Worcester to form the Delaware, Maryland and Virginia Railroad (DMVR). This was completed in May of 1883. The DMVR eventually became part of the Pennsylvania Railroad system anyway and then, following the bankruptcy of Penn Central, part of Conrail before it was sold in part to Norfolk Southern and another part to the state of Delaware.

== Legacy ==
Old Dominion Steamship sold the DMVR to the PW&B, and thus the Pennsylvania Railroad (PRR) system, in 1885. Passenger service on the line ended in 1949. By 1953, steamer service to Chincoteague was ended and trains stopped running into Virginia. In 1955 the DMVR was merged into the PW&B.

In 1956, the section of the rail line in Virginia was abandoned by the PW&B and the PRR and service ended in 1957. The line south of Snow Hill was abandoned either at the same time or by the early 1960's.

The remaining line, then the Snow Hill Secondary Track, was part of the PRR system until that merged into Penn Central in 1968. Following the bankruptcy of Penn Central it was offered to Southern Railway, who declined to buy it, and it became part of Conrail. Conrail sold the line to the Snow Hill Shippers Association in 1982.

In 2000, the Maryland State Report on Transportation included a proposal for a rail trail along the right-of-way in Snow Hill called the "Snow Hill Rail Trail." The town built a 2500'-long gravel trail with barriers between Church Street and Belt Street on the right-of-way. The 2022 Snow Hill Bikeway Feasibility Study proposed turning the section into a paved bikeway.

Snow Hill Shippers sold it to the Maryland and Delaware Railroad (MDDE) in 2000.

In 2025, the MDDE was sold to Carload Express, but the Snow Hill line was broken into two parts and sold to two buyers. The northern 3 miles were sold to the DCR and the rest of the line - including the entirety of what remained of the old Worcester Railroad - was sold to Old Line, the previous owner of the MDDE.
