= Rehoboth Bay =

Coastal Bay in southeastern Delaware, United States

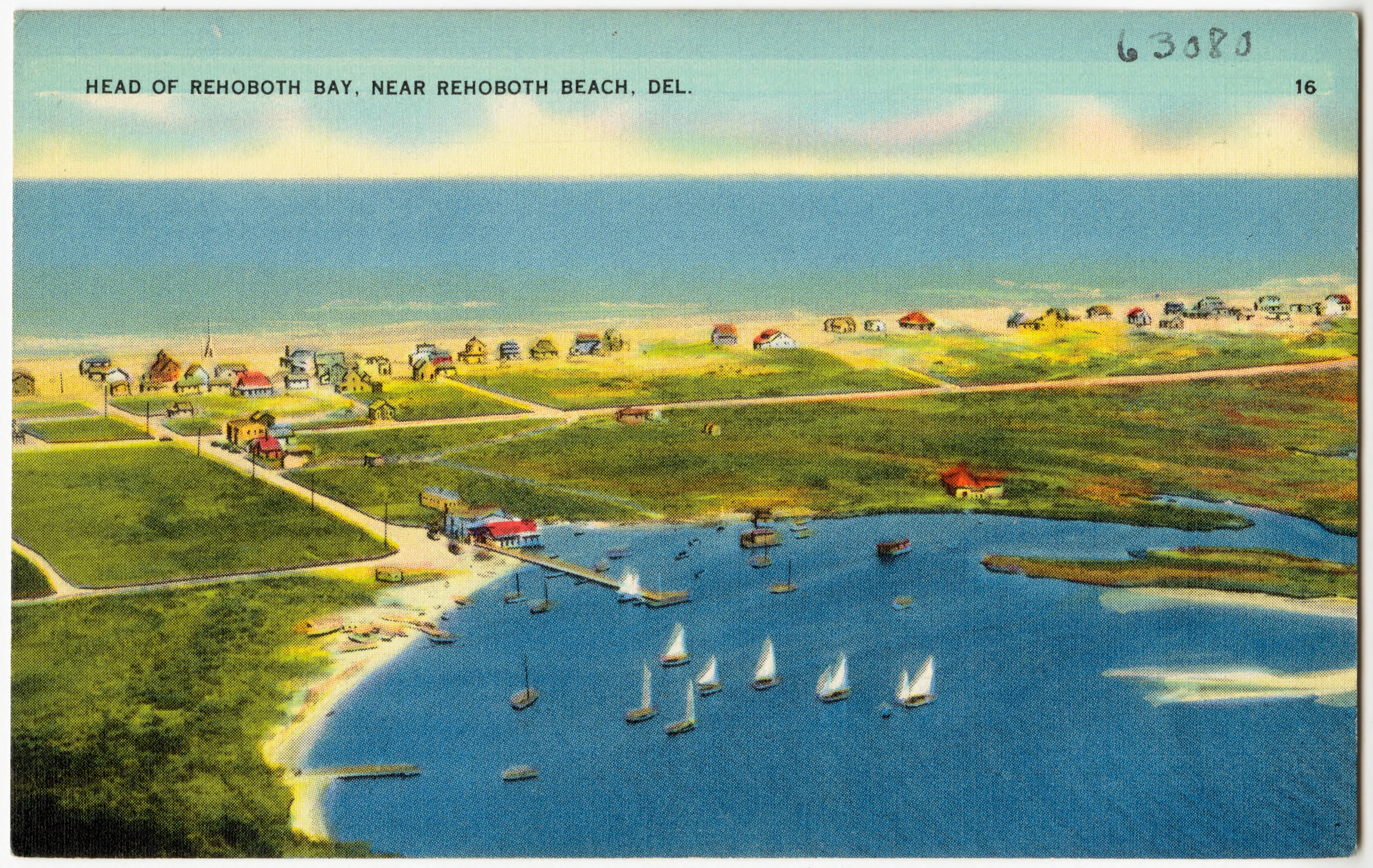
- Rehoboth Bay in Delaware

- Location within Delaware
- Location: Delaware
- Coordinates: 38°39′50.7″N 75°06′16.2″W
- Type: estuary
- Primary inflows: White Oak Creek, Love Creek, Herring Creek, and Guinea Creek
- Primary outflows: Atlantic Ocean
- Basin countries: United States
- Surface area: 13 sq mi (34 km^{2})
- Average depth: 6 ft (1.8 m)
- Settlements: Rehoboth Beach, Delaware and Long Neck, Delaware

Rehoboth Bay is a body of water in Sussex County, Delaware. It is connected to the Broadkill River by the Lewes and Rehoboth Canal. It is part of Delaware's inland bay system, along with Little Assawoman Bay and Indian River Bay.

Of Delaware's inland bays, both Rehoboth Bay and Little Assawoman Bay are barbuilt estuaries, while Indian River Bay is a drowned river valley. Rehoboth Bay is the northernmost of Delaware's inland bays. Its depth is generally shallow, less than 6 to 7 feet below Mean Lower Low Water. The surface area of the bay is approximately 13 square miles. Rehoboth Bay receives fresh water discharges from a number of small creeks along the bay, including White Oak Creek, Love Creek, Herring Creek, and Guinea Creek. Rehoboth Bay is linked to Indian River Bay to the south, providing tidal exchange with the Atlantic Ocean through Indian River Inlet, which is stabilized by two parallel stone jetties. At the north end of the Bay, the Lewes-Rehoboth Canal connects Rehoboth Bay to the Delaware Bay as part of the Intracoastal Waterway. Tidal flow provides some exchange of water between the Delaware Bay and Rehoboth Bay through the canal.

== See also ==
- Lingo Cove
- Lingo Landing
- Rehoboth Beach
