= Senator Franklin (disambiguation) =

Jesse Franklin (1760–1823) was a U.S. Senator from North Carolina from 1799 to 1805 and from 1807 to 1813. Senator Franklin may also refer to:

- Benjamin Cromwell Franklin (1805–1873), Texas State Senate
- Benjamin Joseph Franklin (1839–1898), Kansas State Senate
- Lester C. Franklin (1886–1953), Mississippi State Senate
- Littleton Purnell Franklin (1831–1888), Maryland State Senate
- M. A. Franklin (1862–1928), Mississippi State Senate
- Meshack Franklin (1772–1839), North Carolina State Senate
- Morris Franklin (1801–1885), New York State Senate
- Rosa Franklin (born 1927), Washington State Senate
