= Robley D. Jones =

American politician and judge (1860–1917)

Robley Dunglison Jones
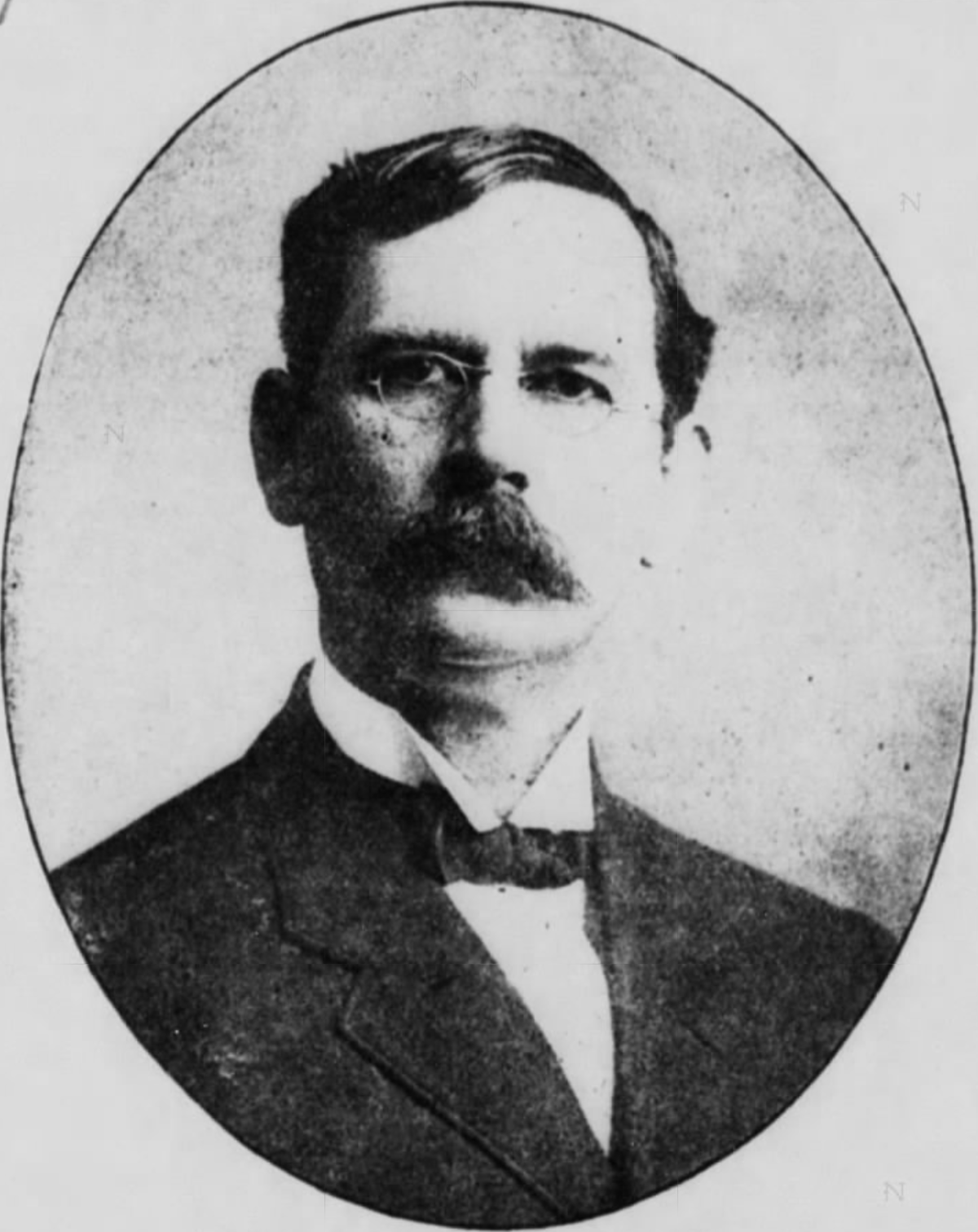

Member of the Maryland House of Delegates
- In office 1908

Personal details
- Born: December 31, 1860 Newark, Maryland, U.S.
- Died: July 7, 1917 (aged 56) Baltimore, Maryland, U.S.
- Resting place: Whitecoat United Methodist Cemetery; Snow Hill, Maryland, U.S.
- Party: Democratic
- Spouse: Louis Richardson Franklin (m. 1897)
- Children: 1
- Education: University of Virginia School of Law
- Occupation: Politician; judge; lawyer
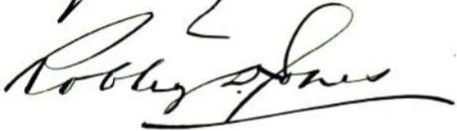
- Signature

Robley Dunglison Jones (December 31, 1860 – July 7, 1917) was an American politician and judge. He served as the state's attorney for Worcester County, Maryland between 1891 and 1903 and as a member of the Maryland House of Delegates in 1908.

== Early life ==
Robley Dunglison Jones was born on December 31, 1860, in Newark, Maryland to Catherine D. (née Gray) and Charles P. Jones. His father was a practicing physician. At a young age, Jones and his parents moved to Snow Hill. Jones was educated at Snow Hill High School. In 1880, Jones became a school master at Girdletree Public School in Girdletree for one year and then conducted a school in Stockton for two years. Jones read law under the instruction of law firm Covington and Wilson. In 1883, Jones attended University of Virginia School of Law and in Spring 1884, Jones was admitted to the bar in Virginia and Maryland.

== Career ==
Jones began a law practice in Snow Hill. In 1891, Jones was elected under a Democratic ticket as state's attorney for Worcester County. He was re-elected twice and served until 1903.

In 1907, Jones was elected to the Maryland House of Delegates. On May 1, 1908, Jones resigned the position and accepted an appointment by Governor Austin Lane Crothers as an associate judge of the first judicial court. He remained in that role until his death.

== Personal life ==
Jones married Louis Richardson Franklin, daughter of Littleton P. Franklin, on December 22, 1897. They had one daughter, Emily.

Jones died on July 7, 1917, at the Church Home and Infirmary in Baltimore after operations for a brain tumor. He was buried at Whitecoat United Methodist Cemetery in Snow Hill.
