= Georgetown–Lewes Trail =

Rail trail in Delaware, United States

The Lewes-Georgetown Trail is an 11 mile long rail trail built on the right-of-way of the abandoned portion of the Junction and Breakwater Railroad between Georgetown, Delaware and Lewes, Delaware. It currently exists in three segments: a 0.7 mile rail-with-trail section between Parsons Lane and Airport Road in Georgetown, a 7.5 mile rail-to-trail section from Fisher Road on the east side of Cool Spring, Delaware, to the Lewes and Rehoboth Canal in Lewes, and a 1.6 mile rail-to-trail section from the canal to Cape Henlopen State Park in Lewes.

== Background ==
The railroad was built in the 19th Century and became part of the Pennsylvania Railroad which eventually operated most of the railroad system in Delaware that ran along this route. The popularity of cars and highways forced the Pennsylvania Railroad and its successors to declare bankruptcy, merge and cut rail service. In 2016, the railroad bridge over the Lewes and Rehoboth Canal was deemed unsafe and too expensive to replace. Operations were shut down, and the last train ran in 2017. The tracks were removed, and in 2022 the historic swing bridge was replaced. The line was decommissioned in 2018 and shortly after the railroad right-of-way was converted to a trail. When the trail is complete it will be 17 miles long.

Planning for the trail began in 2006, with the Statewide Rails to Trails / Rails with Trails Master Plan. At the time the railroad was still running and it was envisioned as a shared use path adjacent to the freight line, but when the railroad was abandoned planners moved it to the abandoned ROW which was cheaper as it required less environmental impact work. The project was envisioned as having 11 phases. The first phase from Gills Neck Road to Savannah Road in Lewes was opened in October 2016, but after that the railroad was shut down for much of the route, the trail design was updated and in 2018 the rail was removed. Phases II & III, from Savannah Road to Minos Conaway Road and then to Log Cabin Road in Lewes, was completed as one project in June 2019, and with some extra money was extended (Phase IV) to Route 9/Cool Spring Road in 2020. Phase V from Georgetown Little League Park on Parsons Lane and Airport Road east of Georgetown was opened on November 19, 2021. Phase VI, from Cool Spring Road to Fisher Road was completed in September 2022. Phase VII, from the Lewes and Rehoboth Canal to Cape Henlopen State Park was completed by summer of 2023. Ground was broken on the last four phases in December 2024, a contract for construction awarded in May 2025 and work is projected for completion by 2026. When completed the trail will run all the way from Georgetown, DE where the rail junction is to Cape Henlopen State Park.

In 2022, by which time the trail in Lewes was built, the Delaware Department of Transportation removed the bridge over the canal and built a trailhead and fishing area at the end of the trail along the canal side.

== Trail Description ==
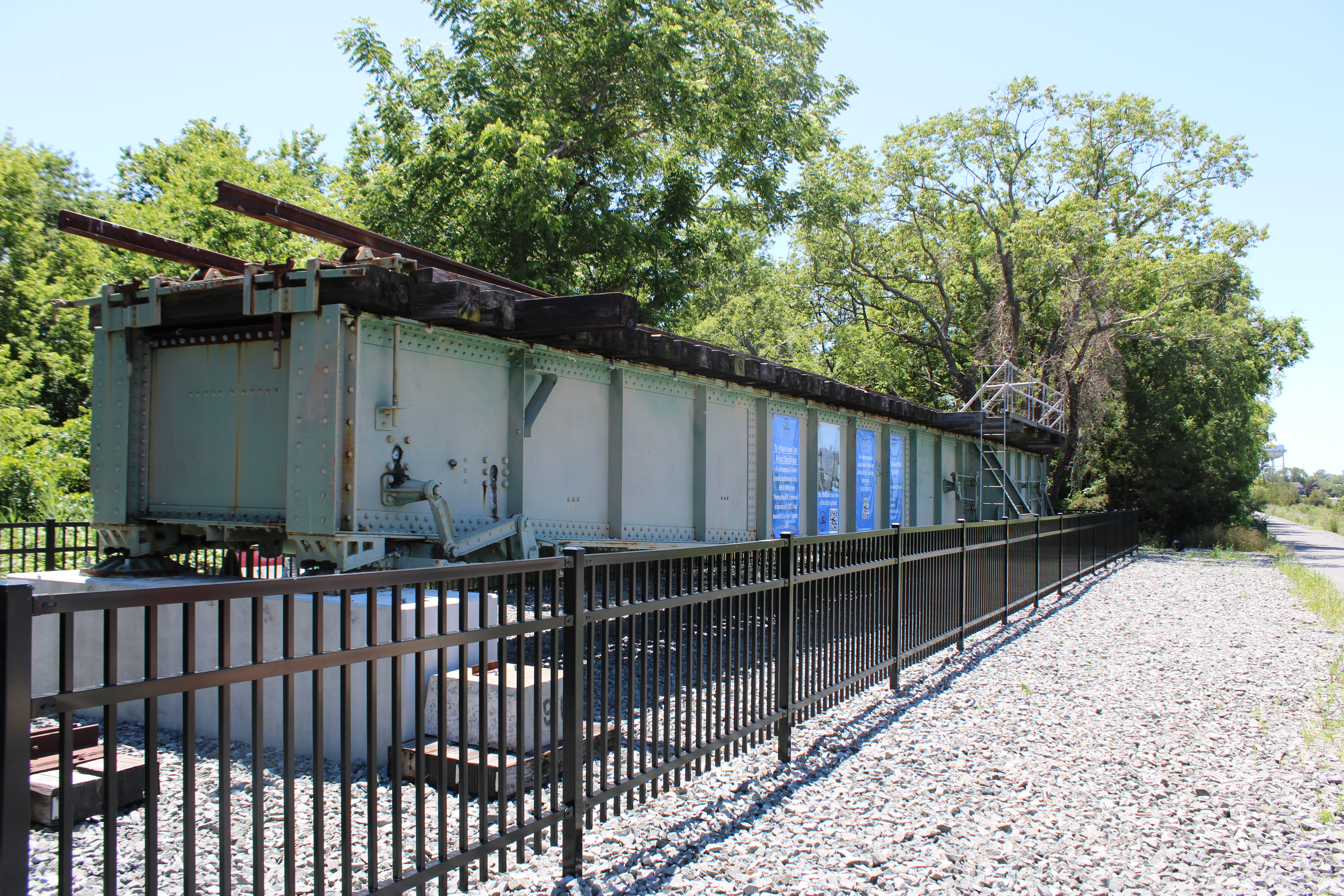
The preserved canal swing bridge along the trail

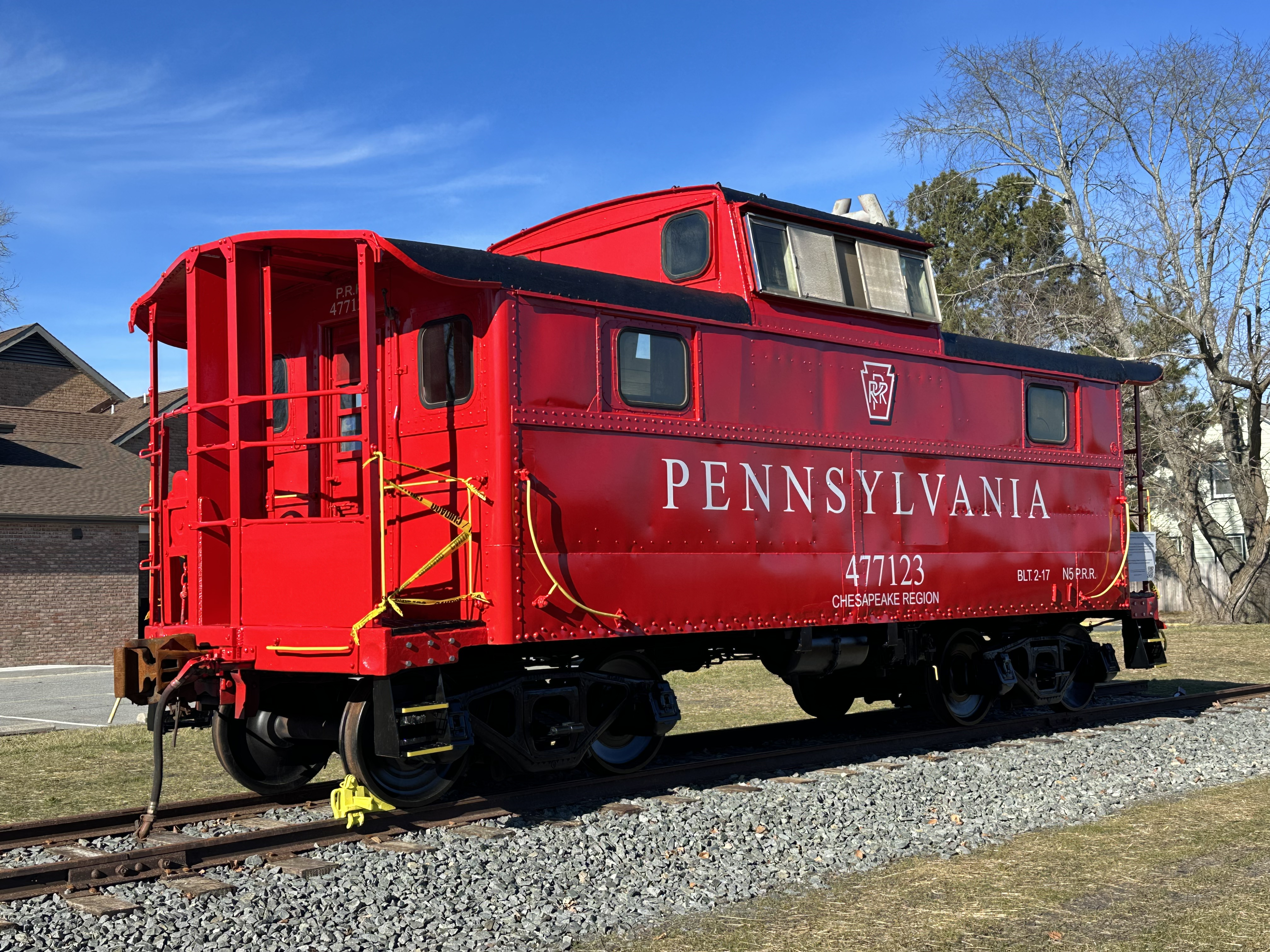
1917 Red Caboose at Lewes next to the trail

The trail starts in Georgetown, where connects residents to the Georgetown Little League Complex, the Sussex Academy of Arts and Science, and the future Sussex County Park.

After a 7-mile gap it picks up Fischer Road and passes through a tree tunnel, meadows and fields and the town of Lewes, where a park next to the Lewes Public Library offers parking, restrooms, benches, a water bottle–filling station, and an in-formation kiosk. The park also features preserved rails, a replica train station and a restored caboose from the old Delaware Coast Line Railroad that used to run the rail line. That section ends at the canal where it connects to the Junction and Breakwater Trail.

From the eastern section trailhead, the trail goes east towards the coast. After a brief stretch of street traffic, the trail's wide lanes open up to a mix of sand, sea grass, and pine trees, offering intermittent shade. Just before Cape Henlopen State Park the trail leaves the railroad ROW and moves onto a protected bike lane.
