= Breakwater and Frankford Railroad =

Former railroad in Delaware, US

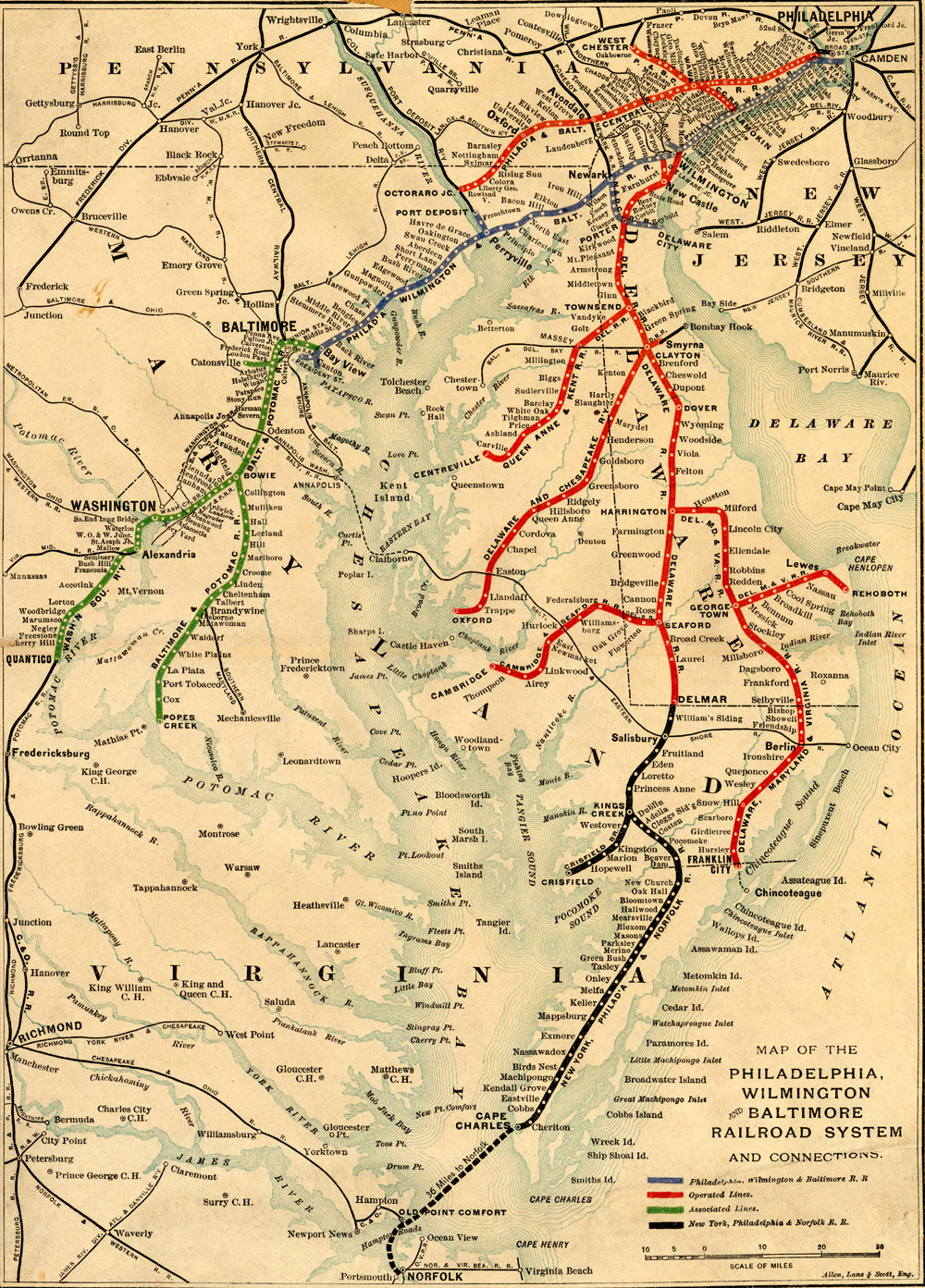
- An early 1890s map of the Philadelphia, Wilmington & Baltimore Railroad showing the Breakwater and Frankford Railroad line

Overview
- Stations called at: Georgetown, Millsboro, Dagsboro, Frankford, Selbyville
- Headquarters: Georgetown, DE
- Key people: Charles C. Stockley
- Locale: Delaware, U.S.
- Dates of operation: 1874–1883
- Successor: Delaware, Maryland and Virginia Railroad

Technical
- Track gauge: 4 ft 8 1/2 in (1,435 mm) standard gauge
- Length: 13 miles (21 km)

The Breakwater and Frankford Railroad (B&F) was a 13 mile long railroad that ran between Georgetown, Delaware and Selbyville, Delaware. It passed through Dagsboro, Delaware and Baltimore Hundred. In 1883, it merged with the Junction and Breakwater Railroad (J&B) and the Worcester Railroad to become the Delaware, Maryland and Virginia Railroad which was eventually purchased by the Pennsylvania Railroad.

Part of the line is now part of the Indian River Secondary owned by Norfolk Southern (NS) and the rest forms part of the Snow Hill Line owned by the Carload Express.

== History ==
Delaware incorporated the Lewes and Millsboro Railroad Company (L&MR) in 1835 to run a railroad line from Lewes south to the state line and passing as near as practicable to the towns of Millsborough, Dagsborough and Frankford.

In 1867 the J&B extended its railroad line from Harrington, Delaware through Georgetown to Lewes and the Delaware Breakwater.

In 1871 the charter of the L&MR was modified to allow the line to start in Georgetown and changed the name to the Breakwater and Frankford Railroad Company. Planning for the railroad to run south from Georgetown started by 1872. In 1873, Delaware committed to a $200,000 loan to aid in its construction. Planning of the route began in September of 1873.

Starting in early 1874 the Breakwater and Frankford Railroad (B&F) (sometimes Frankford and Breakwater) built their rail line south from the J&B at Georgetown to Selbyville, Delaware near the Maryland state line. Work was interrupted by a failure to pay the workers, resulting in a strike and a threat by the workers to lynch someone from the contracting company if not paid. The strike was resolved, work resumed and train operations commenced on Nov 30, 1874.

In January of 1875, the Old Dominion Steamship, which had bought the J&B in 1874, took control of both the J&B and the Worcester Railroad. With their help, the B&F extended their line south to Berlin, Maryland from Selbyville, which was completed in June of 1875. Trains were running by July and south to Franklin City in May of 1876. This created a single line running from Harrington, DE to Franklin City, VA with a connection to the Wicomico and Pocomoke Railroad in Berlin and to Chincoteague from Franklin City via steamer. The B&F helped the cities along the line double in size and led to the building of steam powered saw mills, but it struggled to pay it's mortgage.

In 1881, the Pennsylvania Railroad purchased the Philadelphia, Wilmington and Baltimore Railroad (PW&B) and it appeared they would purchase all the Delmarva lines to consolidate all the railroads on the peninsula. Instead work began in 1882 and completed in 1883 to consolidate the J&B, the B&F and the Worcester under the name of the Delaware, Maryland and Virginia Railroad (DMVR).

== Legacy ==
Old Dominion Steamship sold the DMVR to the PW&B, and thus the Pennsylvania Railroad (PRR) system, in 1885 though the state still owned the mortgages on the J&B and B&F dating back to 1873. In 1891 the PW&B renegotiated the $200,000 mortgage which it continued to pay interest on for years. In 1955 the DMVR was merged into the PW&B.

The line remained part of the PRR system until that merged into Penn Central. Following the bankruptcy of Penn Central it was part of Conrail before it sold the line in two parts.

The northern part of what had been the B&F was sold to NS in 1999 and became part of NS's Indian River Secondary, which runs from Harrington, Delaware to Frankford and connects to a track that serves the Indian River Power Plant.

The section south of Frankford became part of the Snow Hill Line (or Snow Hill Branch) which was sold to the Snow Hill Shippers Association in 1982. They in turn sold it to the Maryland and Delaware Railroad (MDDE) in 2000. In 2025, the MDDE was sold to Carload Express, but the Snow Hill line was broken into two parts and sold to two buyers. The northern 3 miles were sold to the DCR and the rest of the line was sold to Old Line, the previous owner of the MDDE.
