= Lingo Landing =

Delaware locality

Coordinates: 38.628672°N 75.091553°W

Lingo Landing, Delaware is a locality on the southwest shore of Rehoboth Bay located six miles south of Rehoboth Beach in Sussex County, Delaware.
