= Queponco station =

Railway station in Newark, Maryland, US

Queponco
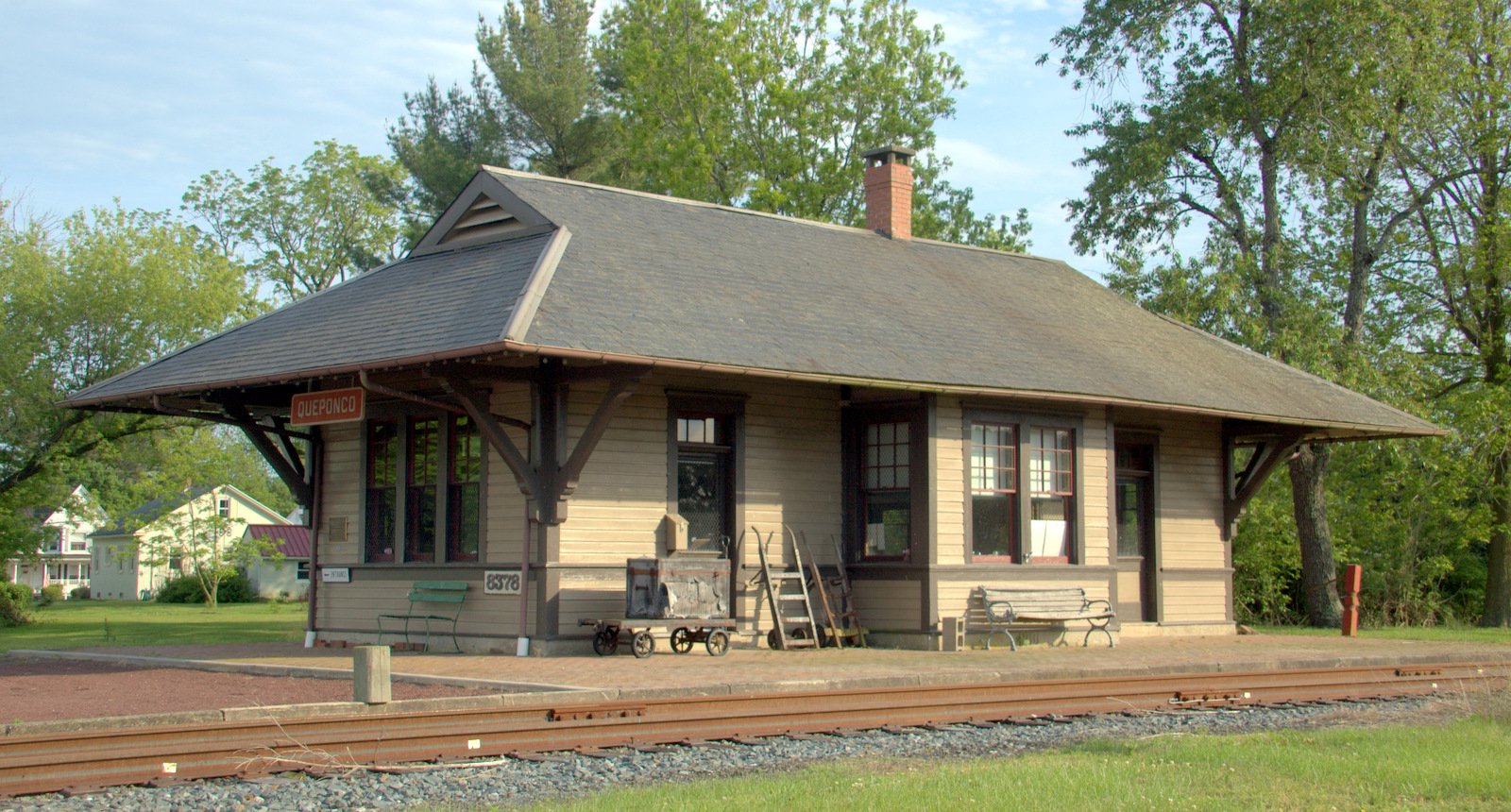
- Quenponco station in May 2017

General information
- Location: 2378 Patey Woods Road; Newark, Maryland; United States

Former services
Preceding station	Pennsylvania Railroad	Following station
Ironshire toward Harrington	Harrington – Franklin City	Wesley toward Franklin City
- Queponco railway station
- U.S. National Register of Historic Places
- Location within Maryland Location within the United States
- Location: 2378 Patey Woods Rd., Newark, Maryland
- Coordinates: 38°15′05″N 75°17′32″W
- Area: less than one acre
- Built: 1910
- NRHP reference No.: 95001546
- Added to NRHP: January 19, 1996
Location

Queponco is a historic United States railway station located at 8378 Patey Woods Road, Newark, Worcester County, Maryland. Constructed by the Pennsylvania Railroad, the Queponco railway station served Snow Hill, Berlin and Newark communities. The station closed in the 1960s.

Queponco was listed on the National Register of Historic Places in 1996 as the Queponco railway station.

== Museum ==
The Queponco railway station preserves railroad heritage in the area and exhibits vintage railroad memorabilia and equipment.
