= Broadkill River =

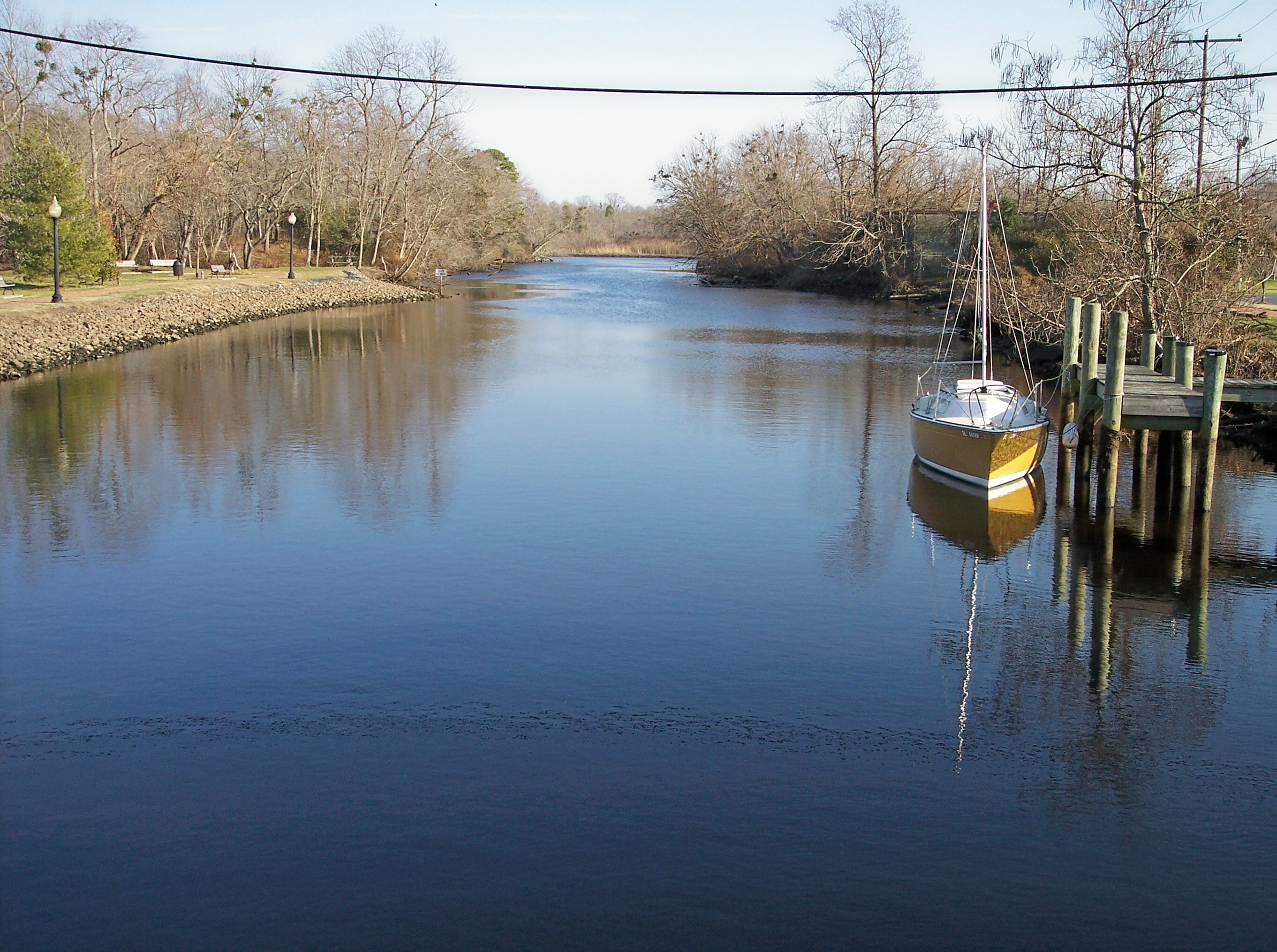
- The Broadkill River in Milton in 2006

- Location of the mouth of the Broadkill River Broadkill River (the United States)

Location
- Country: United States
- State: Delaware
- County: Sussex
- City: Milton

Physical characteristics
- Source: Wagamons Pond
  - location: Milton
  - coordinates: 38°46′37″N 75°18′47″W
- Mouth: Delaware Bay
  - location: northwest of Lewes
  - coordinates: 38°47′25″N 75°09′44″W
  - elevation: 3 ft (0.91 m)
- Length: 13.3 mi (21.4 km)
- Basin size: 110 sq mi (280 km^{2})

Basin features
- Progression: Delaware Bay → Atlantic Ocean
- Tributaries
  - right: Round Pole Branch; Beaverdam Creek; Doty Glade; Crooked Creek; Mill Creek; Canary Creek

The Broadkill River is a river flowing to Delaware Bay in southern Delaware in the United States. It is 13.3 miles (21.4 km) long and drains an area of 110 square miles (280 km^{2}) on the Atlantic Coastal Plain.

The Broadkill flows for its entire length in eastern Sussex County. It issues from Wagamons Pond in the town of Milton; the pond is fed by two tributaries known as Ingram Branch and Pemberton Branch. From Milton, the Broadkill River flows generally eastwardly, passing through wetlands and salt marshes in the Prime Hook National Wildlife Refuge. After approaching to within one and a quarter miles (2.0 km) of Delaware Bay, the river parallels the shoreline a short distance inland for approximately two miles (3.2 km) before flowing into the bay in northwest of Lewes. The United States Coast Guard maintains a station near the mouth of the Broadkill at Green Hill. The mouth is connected to Rehoboth Bay by the Lewes and Rehoboth Canal, which forms part of the Atlantic Intracoastal Waterway.

In the 19th century the river was the center of a regional shipbuilding industry, arising from the access it furnished to inland forests; the industry fell into decline in the 1890s.

A footpath known as the Governors Walk follows the Broadkill in central Milton. The Nature Conservancy established a preserve along the river downstream of Milton in 1998. As of 2005, an annual canoe and kayak race was being held on the river in Milton.

== Variant names and spellings ==
The United States Board on Geographic Names issued an opinion clarifying "Broadkill River" as the stream's name in 1961. According to the Geographic Names Information System, it has also been known historically as:

- Broad Creek
- Broad Kill
- Broad Kill Creek
- Broadkill Creek
- Broadkiln Creek
- Lewis Creek

== See also ==
- List of Delaware rivers
- Thomas Winsmore (schooner)
