= Rillie P. Dennis =

American politician (died 1955)

Member of the Maryland House of Delegates from the Worcester County district
- In office 1943–1950 Serving with Ralph E. Shockley, Henry P. Walters, E. Peter Richardson
- Preceded by: Calvin P. Pruitt, Clarence E. Robertson, Ralph E. Shockley
- Succeeded by: Myrtle A. Polk, Clarence E. Robertson, Ralph E. Shockley

Personal details
- Born: Newark, Maryland, U.S.
- Died: October 8, 1955 (aged 73) near Berlin, Maryland, U.S.
- Party: Democratic
- Spouse: Dorothy
- Children: 3
- Occupation: Politician

Rillie P. Dennis (died October 8, 1955) was an American politician from Maryland.

== Biography ==
Rillie P. Dennis was born in Newark, Maryland, to Alice and Purnell Dennis.

Dennis was a Democrat. He served as a member of the Maryland House of Delegates, representing Worcester County from 1943 to 1950.

Dennis married Dorothy. They had three sons, Walter L., Purnell V. and Billy H. He was a member of Faith Chapel in Libertytown.

Dennis died on October 8, 1955, aged 73, at his home near Berlin.
