= Wicomico and Pocomoke Railroad =

Railroad between Salisbury and Berlin, Maryland, US

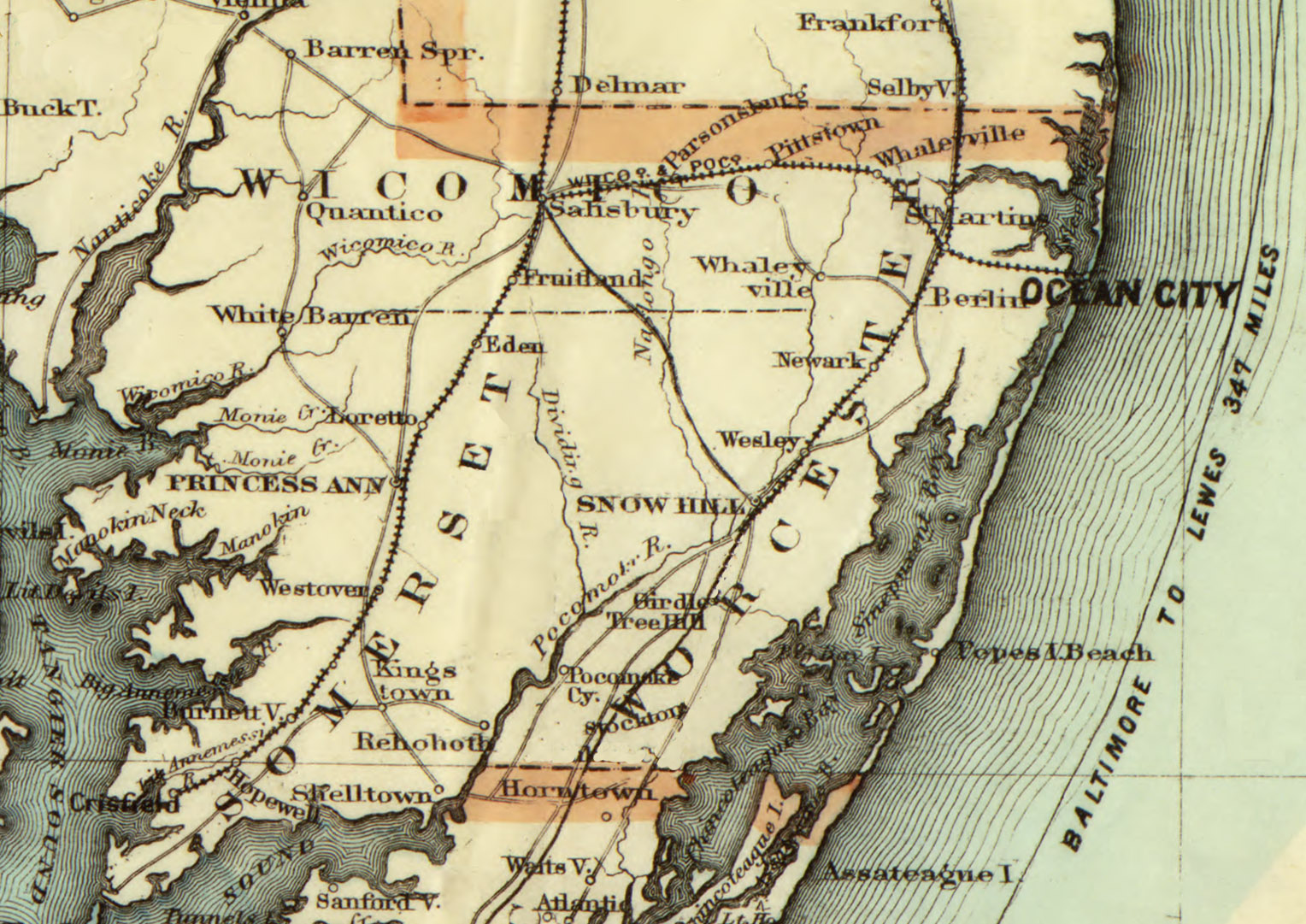
- Wicomico & Pocomoke Railroad

Overview
- Headquarters: Berlin, Maryland
- Key people: H.R. Pitts, Lemuel Showell
- Locale: Maryland, United States
- Dates of operation: 1848–1890
- Successor: Baltimore and Eastern Shore Railroad Company

Technical
- Track gauge: 4 ft 8 1/2 in (1,435 mm) standard gauge
- Electrification: No
- Length: 23 miles (37 km)

The Wicomico and Pocomoke Railroad (W&P), was a railroad that ran 23 miles (37.0 km) from Salisbury, Maryland to Berlin, Maryland from 1868 to 1890, and extended to Ocean City in 1870. At Salisbury, it connected to the Eastern Shore Railroad (ESR). It was chartered in 1848, started construction in 1867 and began operation in 1868. In 1890 it was purchased by the Baltimore and Eastern Shore Railroad and absorbed into that company.

== History ==
The Wicomico and Pocomoke Railroad was incorporated on February 15, 1848, to connect Salisbury, Maryland/the Wicomico River and Berlin, Maryland/the Pocomoke River, a distance of 23 miles, but no progress was made and the charter expired.

In 1860, the ESR built a rail line south from Delmar, DE to Salisbury and, as a result, the W&P charter was revived in 1864 and funds were allocated for construction. In 1866 the ESR extended their line south to Crisfield, Maryland.

The W&P began construction on the line to Berlin in 1867 under the leadership of Dr. H. R. Pitts, the company's president, and completed it in May 1868. One of the original investors, Col. Lemuel Showell of Berlin, later became the company's president.

In 1869–1870, the line was extended ~0.75 miles west to the wharves along the Wicomico River and across the river on a new bridge, which aided in the shipment of lumber and grain to Baltimore. The first train ran to the river on March 31, 1870.

In 1870, the Worcester Railroad began construction on a branch from Berlin to Snow Hill, Maryland, on the Pocomoke river which opened in 1872.

In 1874, the W&P began construction of an extension east from Berlin to Ocean City to bring travelers to the Atlantic Hotel, which opened on July 4, 1875. By early 1875 they had reached Hammock Point on the shore of Sinepuxent Bay just opposite of Ocean City but a bridge to town would not be completed until 1881. Travelers to the hotel could leave Baltimore in the evening by steamship to Crisfield and then by rail on the ESR and W&P and reach the hotel by early morning.

In 1875 the Worcester railroad expanded their line north to Selbyville, on the Delaware state line, where it connected to the Breakwater and Frankford Railroad (B&F), which had built a line south from Georgetown to Frankford, Delaware in 1874 and extended it to the state line in 1875.

Two years later in 1876, the Ocean City Bridge Company built a pivot bridge across Sinepuxent Bay, from Hammock Point to Ocean City, which the railroad could cross for direct access to the hotel; others paid a toll. This remained the only bridge into the city until the state built an auto bridge in 1919.

In 1883, the Junction and Breakwater Railroad (J&B), the B&F and the Worcester railroads merged to form the Delaware, Maryland and Virginia Railroad (DMVR).

In 1886 investors incorporated the Baltimore and Eastern Shore Railroad (B&ES) to build a pair of lines, one on each side of the Chesapeake, to shorten the trip between Baltimore and Ocean City by connecting Claiborne on the Chesapeake to the W&P at Salisbury. Work on the Eastern Shore began in 1899. In June 1890, before the line was even finished, the B&ES and the W&P agreed to merge along with the Bay Ridge and Annapolis Railroad (which owned the terminals at Bay Ridge and Claiborne) to create one railroad of over 100 miles long - which took on the name of the Baltimore and Eastern Shore railroad. The first section of the B&ES from Salisbury to Vienna, Maryland opened two days later on July 4.

The Wicomico & Pocomoke Railroad inclusive of its interests in the bridge into Ocean City, operated by its subsidiary, Ocean City Bridge Company, was sold to the newly organized Baltimore & Eastern Shore railroad in 1888.

== Route ==
The railroad started in Salisbury on the Wicomico River and then headed east, crossing over the ESR, and then on to Walston's Switch, Parsonsburg, Pittsville, Hancock, Whaleyville, St. Martins and finally Berlin. It was later expanded west across the Wicomico River and then east to Ocean City.

== Remnants ==
The only portion of the rail that remains in service today is the 3.65-mile (5.87 km) long Willards Industrial Track, the 0.65-mile (1.05 km) Mardella Industrial Track and the 0.6-mile (0.97 km) Mill Street Industrial Track - all in Salisbury, Maryland - operated by Delmarva Central Railroad on track owned by Norfolk Southern Railroad (NS) and serving Perdue Chicken. Most of the rest of the right of way to Sinepuxent Bay is still owned by NS but much of the rail has been removed. A few bridges and other structures also remain.

In 2012, the Salisbury-Wicomico Metropolitan Planning Organization’s biking and hiking master plan including a 10-mile long trail on the portion of the rail right-of-way between Salisbury and Mardela Springs, Maryland. Wicomico County included a feasibility study on the trail in its preliminary transportation priorities letter to MDOT in every year 2012-2014, but in 2015 Wicomico County Executive Bob Culver said he would no longer support the project.

== See also ==
- List of defunct Maryland railroads
