= Lingo Cove =

Coordinates: 38.63456°N 75.12741°W

Lingo Cove, Delaware is a 0.2 miles (0.32 km)-wide cove in Rehoboth Bay at the mouth of Herring Creek in Sussex County, Delaware.
