= Delaware Bay =

Estuary in the U.S. states of Delaware and New Jersey

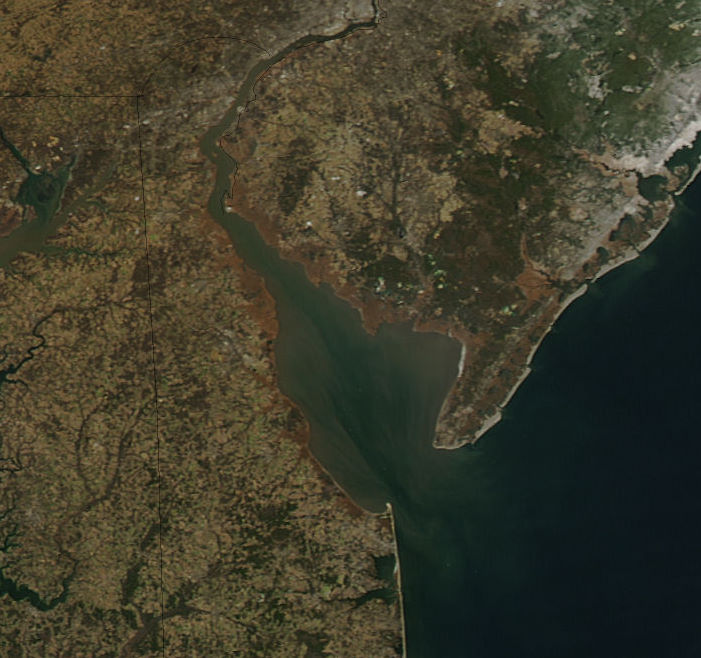
- Delaware Bay in January 2011

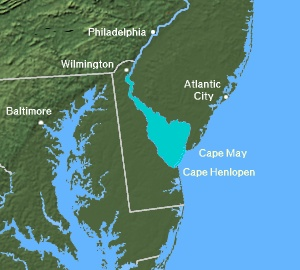
- Map of Delaware Bay

- Location within Delaware
- Coordinates: 39°6′N 75°12′W
- Type: Bay
- Primary inflows: Delaware River
- Basin countries: United States
- Surface area: 782 sq mi (2,030 km^{2})
- Surface elevation: 0 ft (0 m)

Ramsar Wetland
- Official name: Delaware Bay Estuary
- Designated: May 20, 1992
- Reference no.: 559

Delaware Bay is the estuary outlet of the Delaware River on the northeast seaboard of the United States, lying between the states of Delaware and New Jersey. Approximately 782 square miles (2,030 km^{2}) in area, the bay's freshwater mixes for many miles with the saltwater of the Atlantic Ocean.

The bay is bordered inland by the states of Delaware and New Jersey, and its mouth is framed by Cape Henlopen in Delaware and Cape May in New Jersey, on the Atlantic. Delaware Bay is bordered by six counties: Sussex, Kent, and New Castle in Delaware, and Cape May, Cumberland, and Salem in New Jersey. The Cape May–Lewes Ferry crosses Delaware Bay from North Cape May, New Jersey, to Lewes, Delaware. The bay's ports are managed by the Delaware River and Bay Authority.

The shores of the bay are largely composed of salt marshes and mudflats, with only small communities inhabiting the shore of the lower bay. Several of the rivers hold protected status for their salt marsh wetlands bordering the bay, which serves as a breeding ground for many aquatic species, including horseshoe crabs. The bay is also a prime oystering ground.

Delaware Bay was designated a Ramsar Wetland of International Importance on May 20, 1992. It was the first site classified in the Western Hemisphere Shorebird Reserve Network.

== Hydrology ==
Delaware Bay is the ria of the Delaware River, i.e. the drowned river valley that had been the river’s alluvial plain in periods of lower sea level during the Quaternary glaciation. While the Delaware River is by far the largest tributary of Delaware Bay, numerous smaller rivers and streams also drain to the bay. These include the Appoquinimink River, Leipsic River, Smyrna River, St. Jones River, Mispillion River, Broadkill River and Murderkill Rivers on the Delaware side, and the Salem River, Cohansey River, and Maurice Rivers on the New Jersey side.

== Ecology ==
Delaware Bay ecosystem is a key stopover site for over 30 species of migrating shorebirds that migrate north come May. Many birds like red knots use this Bay area to fuel up their energy reserves on horseshoe crab eggs after the long journey. Delaware Bay hosts the largest population of horseshoe crabs in the world.

== History ==
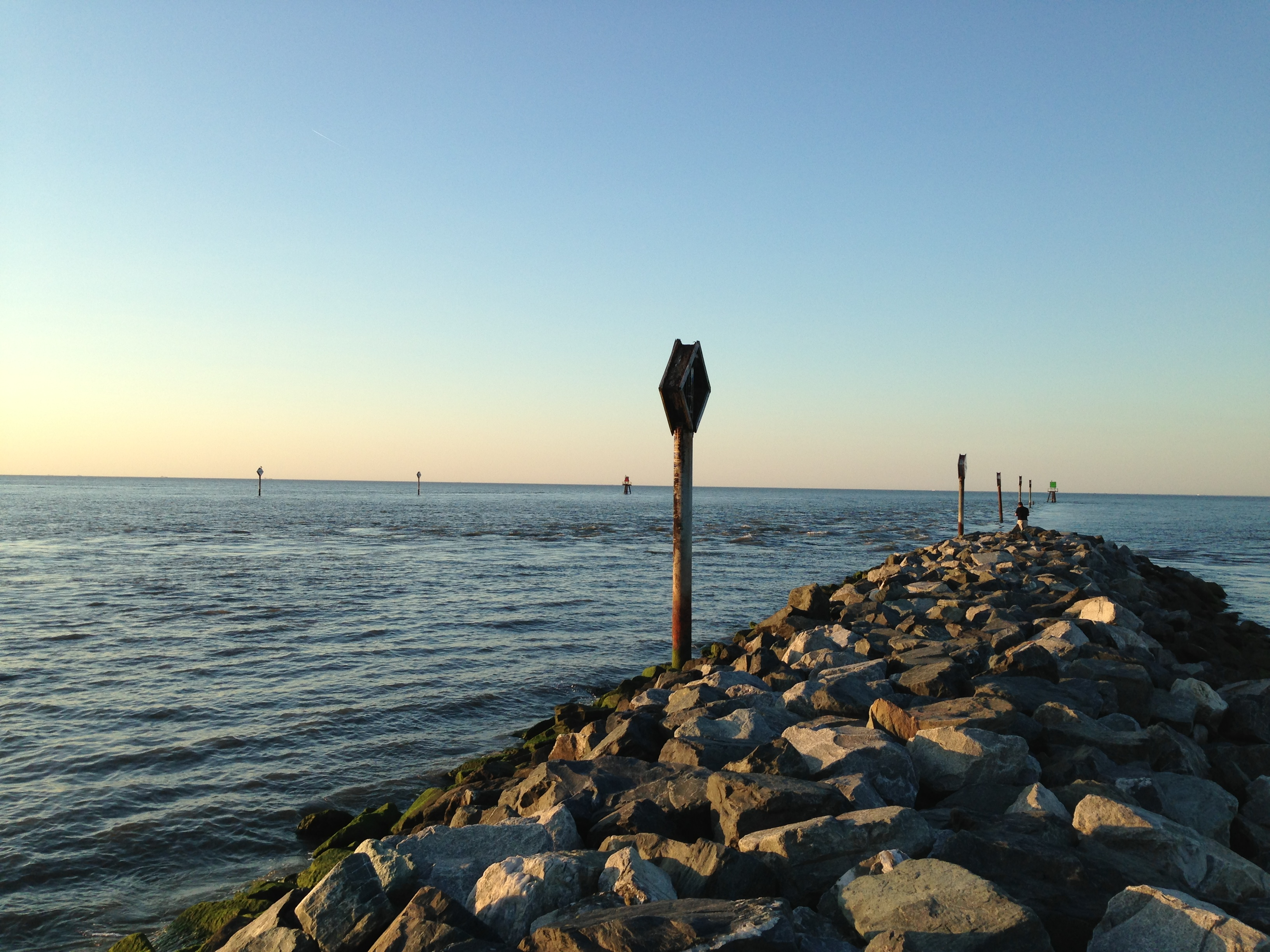
Beginning of the Lewes and Rehoboth Canal at the Roosevelt inlet

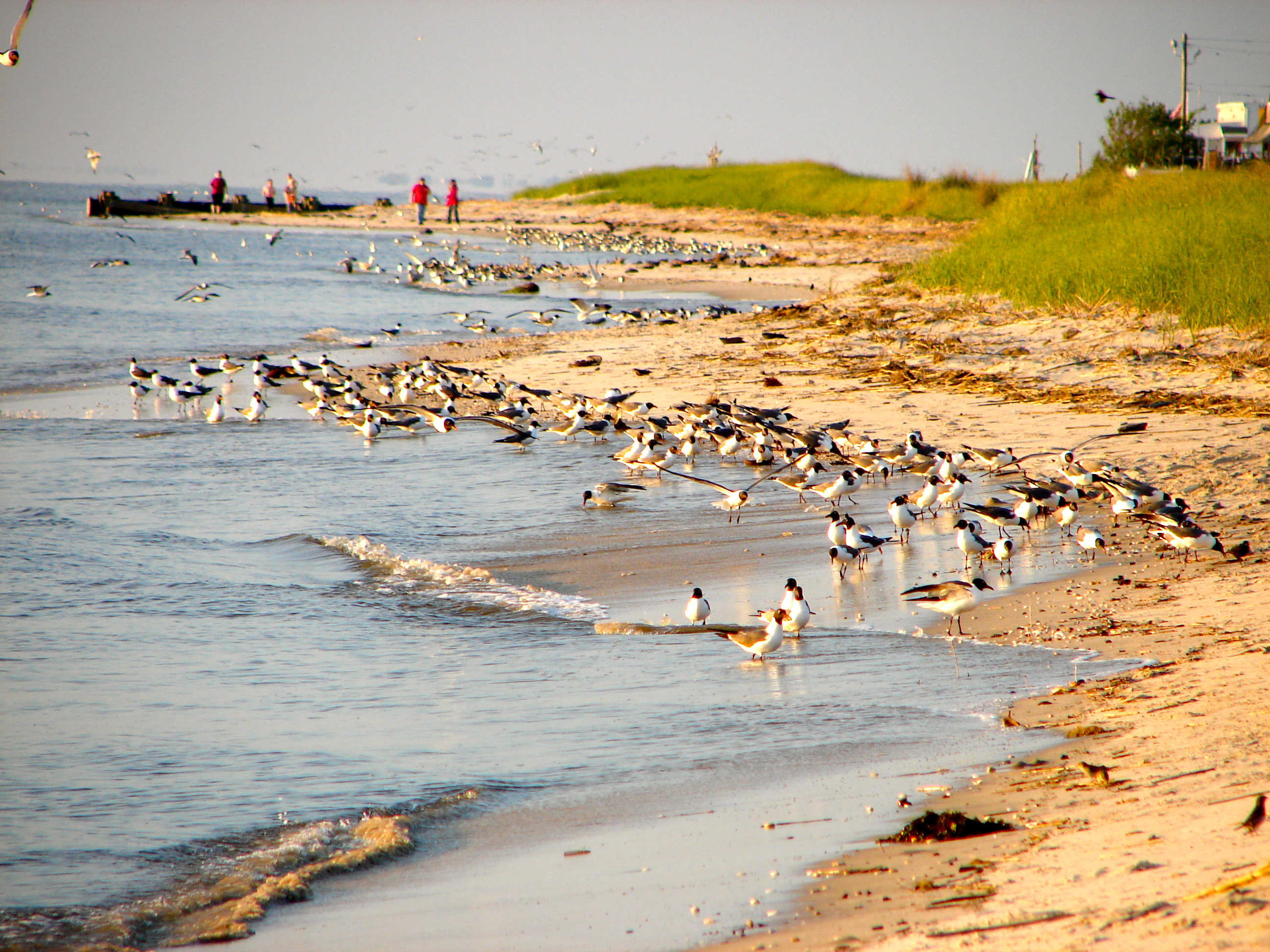
The shore on Cape May, near the Atlantic Ocean

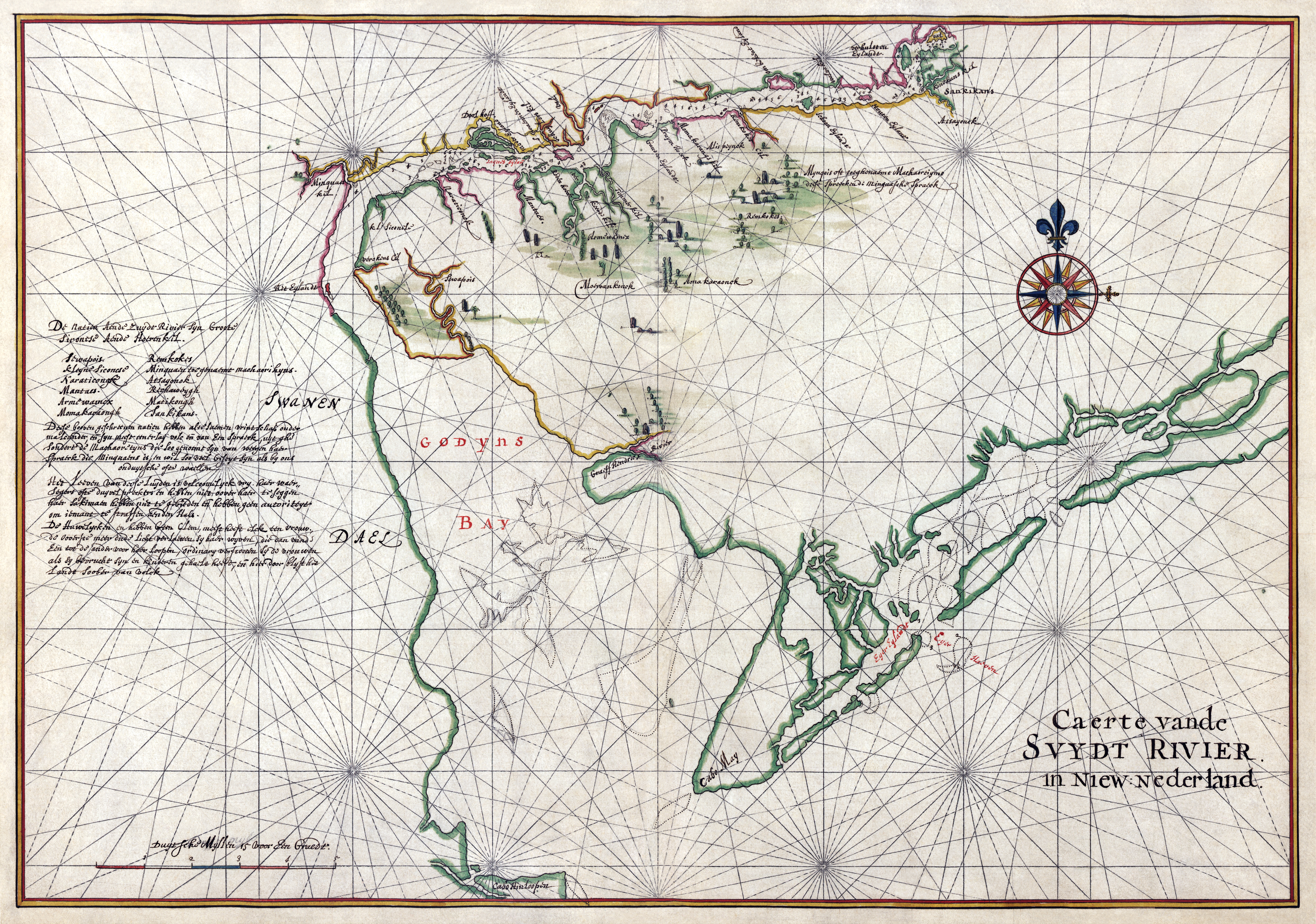
Nautical chart of Zwaanendael Colony, a Dutch colony, and Godyn's Bay (Delaware Bay), 1639

At the time of the arrival of the Europeans in the early 17th century, the area around the bay was inhabited by the Native American Lenape people. They called the Delaware River "Lenape Wihittuck", which means "the rapid stream of the Lenape". Delaware Bay was called "Poutaxat", which means "near the falls".

In 1523, Lucas Vázquez de Ayllón had received from Charles V, Holy Roman Emperor a grant for the land explored in 1521 by Francisco Gordillo and slave trader Captain Pedro de Quejo (de Quexo). Ayllón sent Quejo northward in 1525 and received reports of the coastline from as far north as Delaware Bay. That same year, De Ayllon and Captain Quejo called Delaware Bay by the name "Saint Christopher's Bay". In the 1600s, the bay was known as "Niew Port May" after Captain Cornelius May.

Another recorded European visit to the bay was by Henry Hudson, who claimed it for the Dutch East India Company in 1609. The Dutch called the estuary "Godyns Bay", or "Godins Bay" after a director of the company, Samuel Godijn. As part of the New Netherland colony, the Dutch established several settlements (the most famous being Zwaanendael) on the shores of the bay and explored its coast extensively. The thin nature of the corporate colony's presence in the bay and along what was called the South River (now the Delaware) made it possible for Peter Minuit, the former director of New Netherland, to establish a competing Swedish sponsored settlement, New Sweden in 1638. The resulting dispute with the Dutch colonial authorities in New Amsterdam (New York City) was settled when Petrus Stuyvesant led a Dutch military force into the area in 1655. After the English took title to the New Netherland colony in 1667 at the Treaty of Breda the bay came into their possession and was renamed Delaware Bay, the name given it in 1610 by Samuel Argall, after the then new Governor of Virginia, Thomas West, 3rd Baron De La Warr. The Native American tribe living along the bay and river were later called the Delaware by the Europeans due to their location. The U.S. state also takes its name from the bay and the river.

Conflicting crown grants were made to the James, Duke of York and William Penn on the west bank of the bay and river. Settlement grew rapidly, leading Philadelphia, upriver on the Delaware, to become the largest city in North America in the 18th century. Penn viewed access to Delaware Bay as being so critical to Pennsylvania's survival that he engaged in an eighty-year long legal boundary dispute with the Calvert family to secure it. During the French and Indian War the dissemination of Joshua Fisher's original publication of the "Chart of Delaware Bay" was restricted by the authorities as its accuracy might advantage an enemy approach. In 1782 during the American Revolutionary War, Continental Navy Lieutenant Joshua Barney fought with a British squadron within the bay. Barney's force of three sloops defeated a Royal Navy frigate, a sloop-of-war and a Loyalist privateer.

The strategic importance of the bay was noticed by the Marquis de Lafayette during the American Revolutionary War, who proposed the use of Pea Patch Island at the head of the bay for a defensive fortification to protect the important ports Philadelphia and New Castle, Delaware. Fort Delaware was later constructed on Pea Patch Island. During the American Civil War it was used as a Union prison camp.

In 1855, the United States government systematically undertook the formation of a 26 ft (7.9 m) channel 600 ft (180 m) wide from Philadelphia to deep water in Delaware Bay. The Rivers and Harbors Act of 1899 provided for a 30-foot (9.1 m) channel 600 feet (180 m) wide from Philadelphia to the deep water of the bay. Other names for the bay have been "South Bay" and "Zuyt Baye".

=== 21st century ===
The bay is one of the most important navigational channels in the United States; it is the second busiest waterway after the Mississippi River. Its lower course forms part of the Intracoastal Waterway. The need for direct navigation around the two capes into the ocean is circumvented by the Cape May Canal and the Lewes and Rehoboth Canal at the north and south capes respectively. The upper bay is connected directly to the north end of Chesapeake Bay by the Chesapeake & Delaware Canal.

The U.S Coast Guard sector for Delaware Bay was established in 2005, and has 570 active personnel, and 195 reservists.

== See also ==
- Partnership for the Delaware Estuary
- Lewes and Rehoboth Canal
- Chesapeake and Delaware Canal
- Broadkill River
- St. Jones River
