= Newark, Maryland =

- CDP
- Location of Newark, Maryland
- Coordinates: 38°15′55″N 75°16′18″W
- Country: United States
- State: Maryland
- County: Worcester

Area
  - Total: 9.46 sq mi (24.49 km^{2})
  - Land: 9.44 sq mi (24.44 km^{2})
  - Water: 0.015 sq mi (0.04 km^{2})
- Elevation: 30 ft (9 m)

Population (2020)
  - Total: 401
  - Density: 42/sq mi (16.4/km^{2})
- Time zone: UTC−5 (Eastern (EST))
  - Summer (DST): UTC−4 (EDT)
- ZIP code: 21841
- Area codes: 410, 443
- FIPS code: 24-55325
- GNIS feature ID: 0590878

Newark is a census-designated place (CDP) in Worcester County, Maryland, United States. The population was 339 at the 2000 census. It is part of the Salisbury, Maryland-Delaware Metropolitan Statistical Area.

== History ==
Queponco Railway Station was listed on the National Register of Historic Places in 1996.

== Geography ==
Newark is located at 38°15′55″N 75°16′18″W (38.265176, −75.271768).

According to the United States Census Bureau, the CDP has a total area of 9.6 square miles (25 km^{2}), all land.

== Demographics ==
Historical population
Census	Pop.	Note	%±
2000	339		—
2020	401		—
U.S. Decennial Census

As of the census of 2000, there were 339 people, 135 households, and 93 families residing in the CDP. The population density was 35.4 inhabitants per square mile (13.7/km^{2}). There were 152 housing units at an average density of 15.9/sq mi (6.1/km^{2}). The racial makeup of the CDP was 77.29% White, 19.76% African American, 1.18% from other races, and 1.77% from two or more races. Hispanic or Latino of any race were 1.47% of the population.

There were 135 households, out of which 32.6% had children under the age of 18 living with them, 53.3% were married couples living together, 8.1% had a female householder with no husband present, and 30.4% were non-families. 25.2% of all households were made up of individuals, and 14.8% had someone living alone who was 65 years of age or older. The average household size was 2.46 and the average family size was 2.87.

In the CDP, the population was spread out, with 23.6% under the age of 18, 5.0% from 18 to 24, 26.3% from 25 to 44, 29.2% from 45 to 64, and 15.9% who were 65 years of age or older. The median age was 43 years. For every 100 females, there were 100.6 males. For every 100 females age 18 and over, there were 94.7 males.

The median income for a household in the CDP was $38,333, and the median income for a family was $37,250. Males had a median income of $26,250 versus $23,750 for females. The per capita income for the CDP was $18,478. About 6.1% of families and 8.0% of the population were below the poverty line, including 8.8% of those under age 18 and none of those age 65 or over.

== Notable people ==
- Rillie P. Dennis (died 1955), member of the Maryland House of Delegates
- Robley D. Jones (1860–1917), state's attorney and member of the Maryland House of Delegates
- Ralph L. Mason (died 1977), Maryland state senator
