= Milford station (Delaware) =

Railway station in Delaware, US

Milford
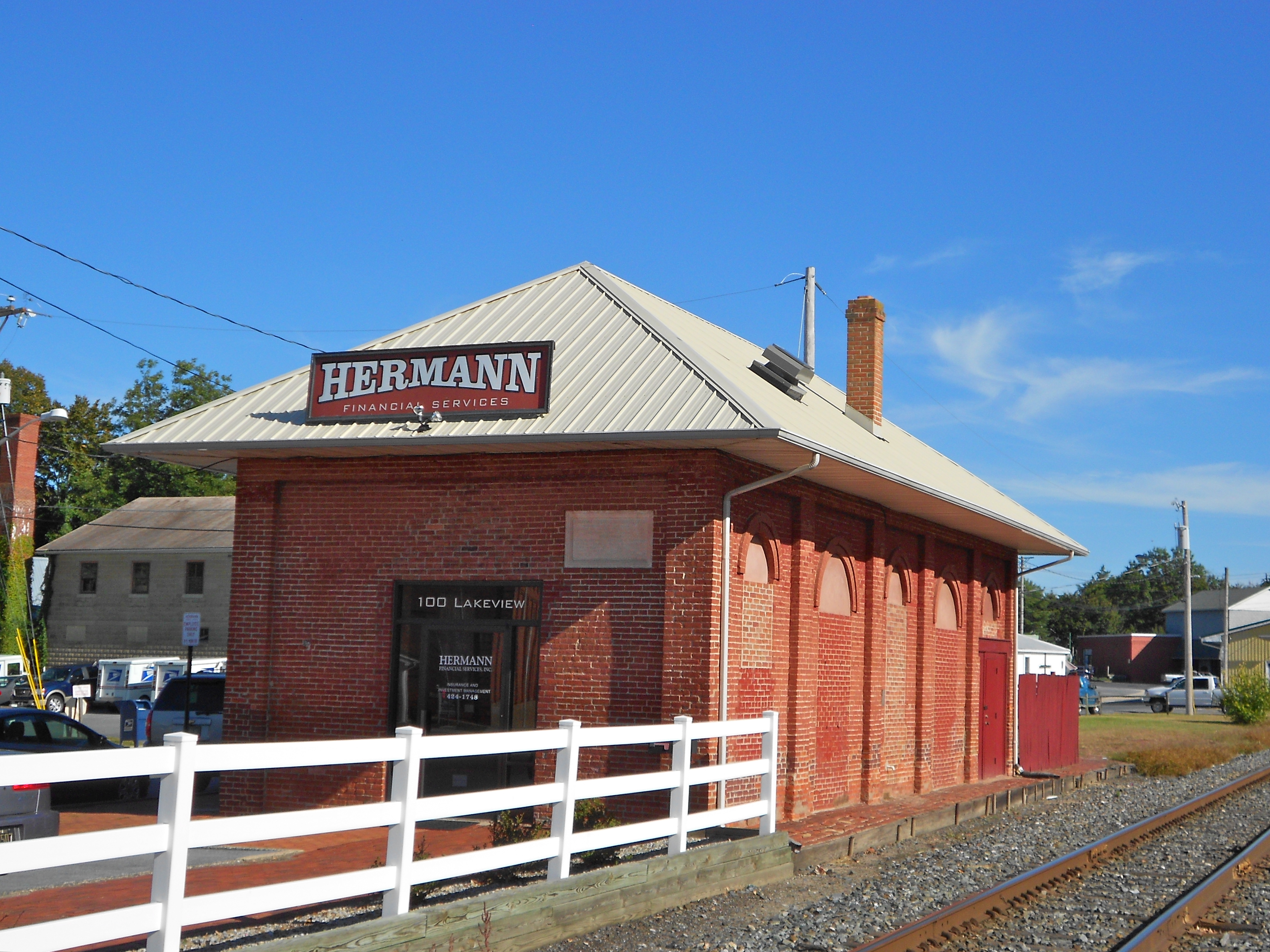
- Milford station in September 2013

General information
- Location: 100 Lake View Ave; Milford, Delaware; United States

History
- Opened: 1862

Former services
Preceding station	Pennsylvania Railroad	Following station
Houston toward Harrington	Harrington – Franklin City	Lincoln City toward Franklin City
- Milford Railroad Station
- U.S. National Register of Historic Places
- Location within Delaware Location within the United States
- Location: DE 36, Milford, Delaware
- Coordinates: 38°54′38″N 75°25′57″W
- Area: less than one acre
- MPS: Milford MRA
- NRHP reference No.: 83001356
- Added to NRHP: January 7, 1983
Location

Milford is a historic railroad station located at Milford, Sussex County, Delaware. It was built in the early 1860s, and is a one-story, five-bay, brick building with a hipped roof and extended overhangs.

It was added to the National Register of Historic Places in 1983 as the Milford Railroad Station. The station is no longer in use, though the track behind it is still used by a Delmarva Central Railroad freight line.

An engine shed was shown at this location on an atlas dated 1859, also including a turntable. Nine years later, another atlas displayed both the engine shed and the station, and a freight station was subsequently added.

A marble plaque is located there, honoring the men who inaugurated the railroad, including Governor Peter F. Causey, who served on its first Board of Directors. The railroad enabled farmers to more cheaply brings crops to market, especially peaches. The structure today looks almost the same as it did when first built in the nineteenth century. In recent years, a local business has been housed there, called Marshall, Wagner & Assoc., P.A., Certified Public Accountants
