= Littleton Purnell Franklin =

American politician (1831–1888)

Littleton Purnell Franklin (January 18, 1831- April 9, 1888) was an American politician. He served in the Maryland House of Representatives and the Maryland Senate. He was also a member of the 1867 Constitutional Convention of Maryland.

== Early life ==
Franklin, the son of Henry and Mary (Purnell) Franklin, was born on January 18, 1831, in Berlin, Maryland, where he spent nearly the whole of his useful life. He entered Yale College in the third term of the Freshman year. After graduation in 1849, he read law in Snow Hill, Maryland, with Judge John R. Franklin.

== Career ==
In May, 1852, Franklin was admitted to the bar. Being in delicate health throughout all this portion of his life, he never entered on the practice of his profession, but employed his time principally in farming near Berlin.

In 1867 he represented Worcester County in the convention which framed the present Constitution of Maryland. He was elected in 1871 to the Maryland House of Delegates on the Democratic ticket. In 1877, he was elected to the Maryland State Senate. He served in the sessions of 1878 and 1880.

== Personal life ==
Franklin married Sarah E. Chaney on February 9, 1853. She was the daughter of Thomas Chaney, Esq., of Issaquena County, Mississippi. The couple had seven children, two daughters and two sons who survived their father.

Franklin was an elder in the Presbyterian Church of Berlin.

He died at his home near Berlin, of typhoid fever, after an illness of two weeks, on April 9, 1888, in his 58th year. He was buried in Buckingham Cemetery.
