= Junction and Breakwater Trail =

Rail trail in Delaware, United States

Coordinates: 38°44′02″N 75°06′42″W

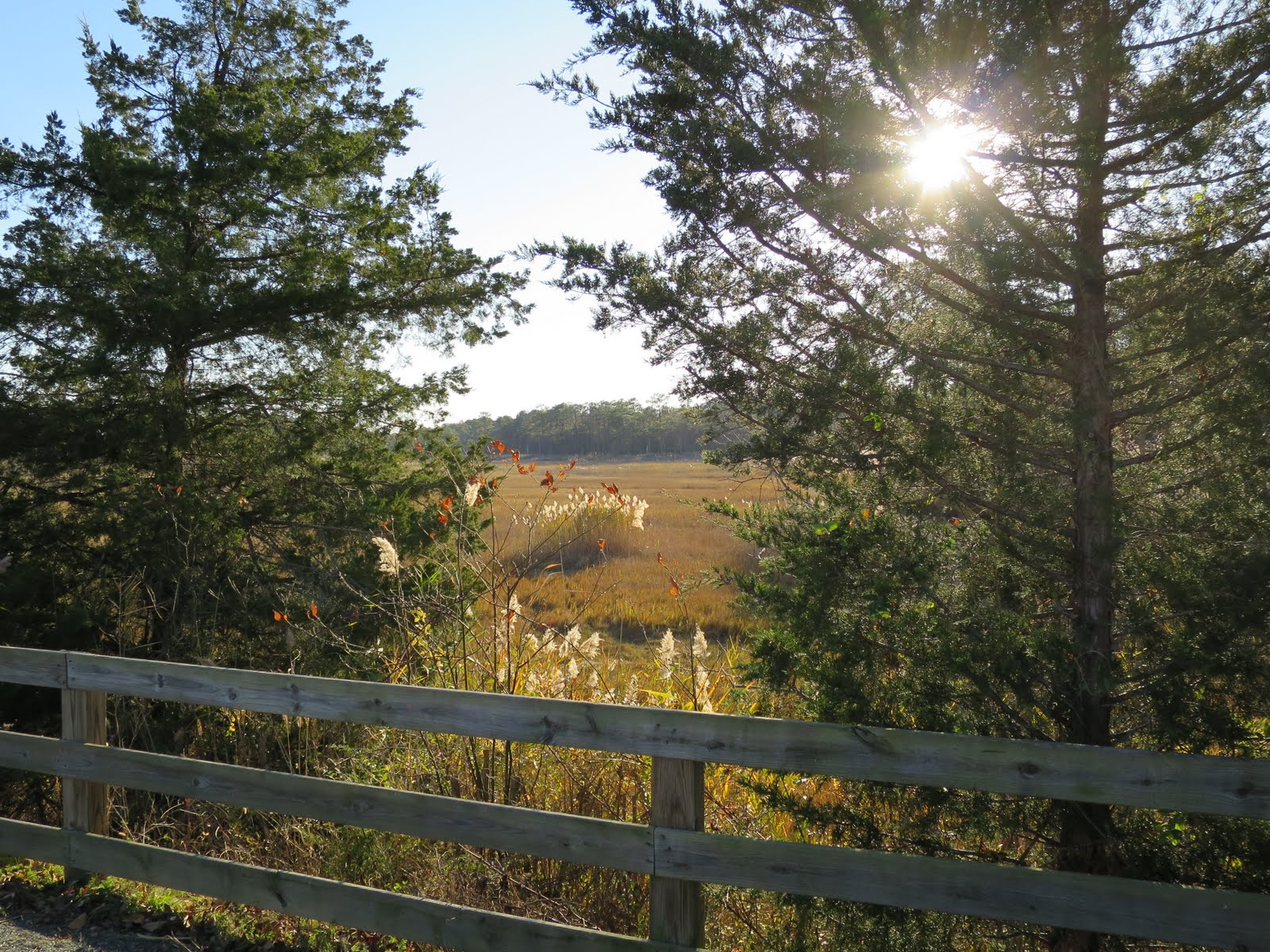
- Sun shining through on the Junction & Breakwater Trail
- Length: 6 mi (9.7 km)
- Location: Cape Henlopen, Delaware, US
- Established: 2003
- Trailheads: Lewes and Rehoboth Beach, Delaware
- Use: Hiking, cycling
- Difficulty: Easy
- Surface: Crushed stone
- Right of way: Penn Central Transportation Company
- Website: destateparks.com/Trails

The Junction and Breakwater Trail is a 6-mile (9.7 km) long rail trail located on the southwestern side of Cape Henlopen State Park connecting Lewes and Rehoboth Beach, Delaware, United States. It is the third rail trail built in Delaware and it is the longest in the state. It partially follows the former Junction and Breakwater Railroad's Rehoboth Beach branch that opened in the mid-19th century. It later came under control of the Pennsylvania Railroad and transported passengers to several Methodist resort camps along the Atlantic coast. The line was abandoned by the Penn Central in the early 1970s.

The first 3.6 miles (5.8 km) of the trail was opened in December 2003 after acquiring parcels and easements from private landowners. On June 4, 2007, an additional 2.4 miles (3.9 km) were added, extending the trail to Kings Highway in Lewes. Plans are being discussed to extend the trail further into town.

The trail includes two bridges, including an 80-foot (24 m) long railroad bridge originally built in 1913 that crosses Holland Glade and provides views of coastal wetlands and of a World War II observation tower located on the coast. The trail consists of crushed stone with an average width of 12 feet (3.7 m).
