= Lewes and Rehoboth Canal =

Canal in Delaware, United States

Coordinates: 38°45′27″N 75°06′34″W

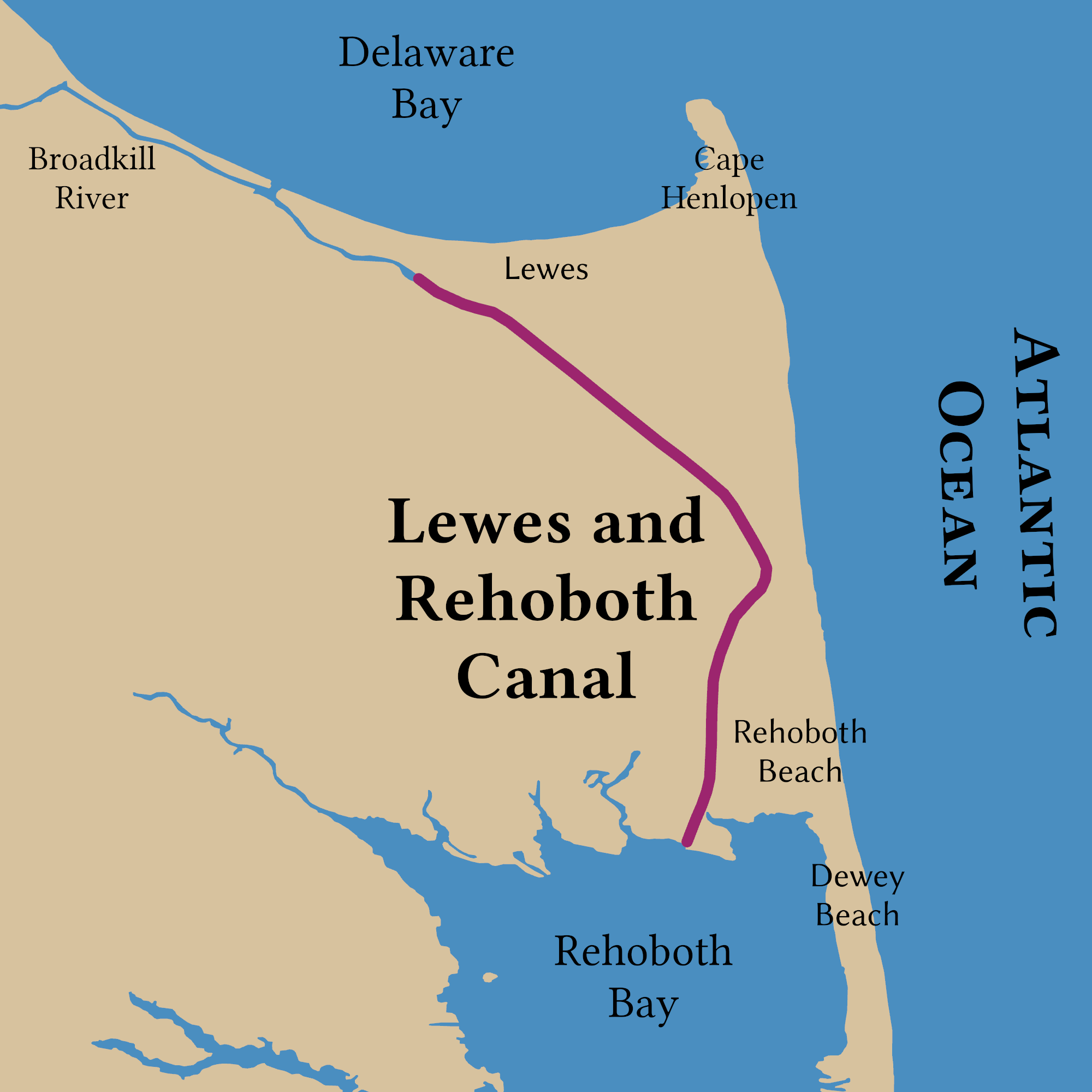
Path of the Lewes and Rehoboth Canal

The Lewes and Rehoboth Canal is a canal in Sussex County, Delaware, which connects the Broadkill River and the Delaware Bay to Rehoboth Bay. It forms a portion of the Intracoastal Waterway.

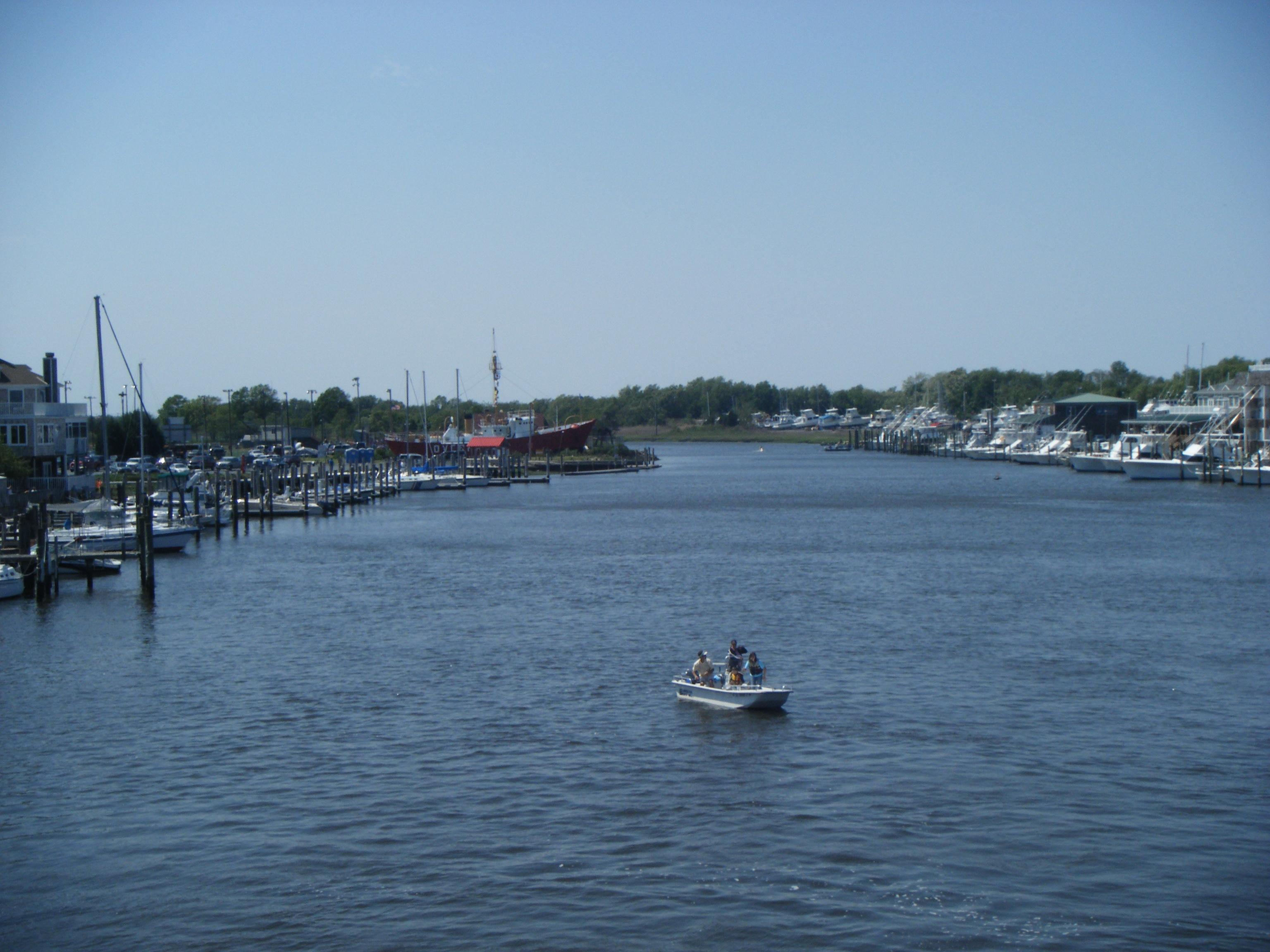
Lewes and Rehoboth Canal in Lewes.

== History ==
Originally proposed in 1803, the canal was finally constructed by the Army Corps of Engineers from 1913 to 1916. Despite its intended use as a freight shipment route, it saw little use for that purpose due to the development of more efficient roads and railways; instead, the canal has primarily been used for leisure boating for the majority of its history.

== See also ==
- Lewes, Delaware
- Rehoboth Bay, Delaware
- Rehoboth Beach, Delaware
- Assawoman Canal
