= Franklin City, Virginia =

Unincorporated community in Virginia, United States

Coordinates: 38°00′28″N 75°23′01″W

Franklin City is an unincorporated community in Accomack County, Virginia, United States.

== History ==
Greenbackville and neighboring Franklin City grew as a result of the railroad line laid in the late 19th century to transport oysters and other shellfish from Chincoteague to Baltimore, Philadelphia, and New York City. By the 1870s, the Frankfort and Worcester Railroad reached Snow Hill, Maryland. In 1876, Maryland judge John R. Franklin, a stockholder in the railroad, was able to get the line extended to land he owned just south of the state line in Virginia. Later, the New York, Philadelphia and Norfolk Railroad built track the length of the Delmarva Peninsula, reaching Cape Charles in 1884 and joining the Frankfort & Worcester.

After the construction of the Chincoteague Causeway, the Depression and the nor'easter of 1962 continued to erode Franklin City's and Greenbackville's economic base. Little remains of Franklin City.
