= List of Delaware state senators =

A table of the members of the Delaware State Senate.

== State Senate under the Delaware Constitution of 1776 ==
There were three senators elected at-large from each county for a one-year term. Elections were held in October.

| Session | District | | | | | | | | | Session |
| Session | New Castle County | | | Kent County | | | Sussex County | | | Session |
| Session | 1st at-large | 2nd at-large | 3rd at-large | 1st at-large | 2nd at-large | 3rd at-large | 1st at-large | 2nd at-large | 3rd at-large | Session |
|---|---|---|---|---|---|---|---|---|---|---|
| 1st* (1776) | Richard Cantwell | George Read | Nicholas Van Dyke Sr. | Richard Bassett | Thomas Collins | James Sykes Sr. & John Banning | Daniel Dingee & John Jones | William Polk & Samuel S. Sloss | John Wiltbank | 1st* (1776) |
| 2nd* (1777) | Peter Hyatt | George Read | Nicholas Van Dyke Sr. | Richard Bassett | Thomas Collins | John Banning | John Jones | Samuel S. Sloss & William Conwell | John Clowes | 2nd* (1777) |
| 3rd* (1778) | Peter Hyatt | George Read | Samuel Patterson | Richard Bassett | Thomas Collins | John Banning | William Polk | William Conwell | John Clowes | 3rd* (1778) |
| 4th* (1779) | Peter Hyatt | Richard Cantwell | Samuel Patterson | Richard Bassett | Thomas Collins | John Banning | William Polk | William Conwell | John Clowes | 4th* (1779) |
| 5th* (1780) | Peter Hyatt | Richard Cantwell | Thomas McDonough | John Cook | Thomas Collins | John Banning | William Polk | William Conwell | John Clowes | 5th* (1780) |
| 6th* (1781) | Peter Hyatt | John Dickinson & Isaac Grantham | Thomas McDonough | John Cook | Thomas Collins | John Banning | William Polk | William Conwell | John Polk | 6th* (1781) |
| 7th* (1782) | George Read | Isaac Grantham | Thomas McDonough | John Cook | Richard Bassett | John Banning | William Polk | John Collins | Joshua Polk | 7th* (1782) |
| 8th* (1783) | George Read | Isaac Grantham | Thomas McDonough | Caesar Rodney | Richard Bassett | John Banning | William Polk | John Collins | Joshua Polk | 8th* (1783) |
| 9th* (1784) | George Read | George Craighead | Thomas McDonough | Vincent Loockerman | Richard Bassett | Silas Snow | William Polk | Henry Neill | Joshua Polk | 9th* (1784) |
| 10th* (1785) | George Read | George Craighead | Thomas McDonough | John Banning | James Tilton | Silas Snow | Daniel Polk | Henry Neill | Joshua Polk | 10th* (1785) |
| 11th* (1786) | George Read | George Craighead | Nicholas Van Dyke Sr. | John Banning | James Tilton | Silas Snow | Daniel Polk | Henry Neill | Joshua Polk | 11th* (1786) |
| 12th* (1787) | George Read | George Read Jr. | Thomas McDonough | John Banning | John Cook | Silas Snow | Daniel Polk | Henry Neill | Joshua Polk | 12th* (1787) |
| 13th* (1788) | George Read | George Craighead | Thomas McDonough | John Banning | John Cook | Nicholas Ridgely | Daniel Polk | Henry Neill | Joshua Polk | 13th* (1788) |
| 14th* (1789) | Gunning Bedford Sr. | Thomas Kean | Alexander Porter | John Banning | John Gordon | Nicholas Ridgely | Daniel Polk | Henry Neill | Joshua Polk | 14th* (1789) |
| 15th* (1790) | Gunning Bedford Sr. | Thomas Kean | Alexander Porter | John Banning | James Tilton | Nicholas Ridgely | Daniel Polk | Henry Neill | Joshua Polk | 15th* (1790) |
| 16th* (1791) | Archibald Alexander | Thomas Kean | Nehemiah Tilton | John Banning | James Tilton | Silas Snow | Daniel Polk | Henry Neill | Joshua Polk | 16th* (1791) |

== State Senate under the Delaware Constitution of 1792 ==
There were three senators elected at-large from each County for a one-year term. Elections were held in November.

| Session | District | | | | | | | | | Session |
| Session | New Castle County | | | Kent County | | | Sussex County | | | Session |
| Session | 1st at-large | 2nd at-large | 3rd at-large | 1st at-large | 2nd at large | 3rd at-large | 1st at-large | 2nd at-large | 3rd at-large | Session |
|---|---|---|---|---|---|---|---|---|---|---|
| 17th* (1792) | Archibald Alexander | Robert Haughey | John Dickinson | John Morris | John M. Vining | Edward White | Daniel Polk | Daniel Rogers | Rhodes Shankland | 17th* (1792) |
| 18th* (1793) | Archibald Alexander | Isaac Grantham | Thomas Kean | Isaac Davis | James Sykes Jr. | George Wilson | Daniel Polk | Daniel Rogers | George Mitchell | 18th* (1793) |
| 19th* (1794) | John Stockton | Isaac Grantham | Thomas Kean | Isaac Davis | James Sykes Jr. | Joseph Miller | 19th* (1794) | Daniel Rogers | George Mitchell |
| 20th* (1795) | John James | Alexander Porter | Thomas Kean | Isaac Davis | James Sykes Jr. | Joseph Miller | 20th* (1795) | Daniel Rogers | George Mitchell |
| 21st* (1796) | John James | Alexander Porter | Archibald Alexander | Isaac Davis | George Cummins | Joseph Miller | 21st* (1796) | | George Mitchell |
| 22nd* (1797) | John James | Edward Roche | Archibald Alexander | Isaac Davis | George Cummins | James Sykes Jr. | 22nd* (1797) |
| 23rd* (1798) | John James | Isaac Grantham | Archibald Alexander | Isaac Davis | George Cummins | James Sykes Jr. | 23rd* (1798) |
| 24th* (1799) | Peter Brynberg | Isaac Grantham | Archibald Alexander | James Raymond | John M. Vining | James Sykes Jr. | 24th* (1799) |
| 25th* (1800) | John Bird | Isaac Grantham | Thomas Fitzgerald | James Raymond | John M. Vining | James Sykes Jr. | 25th* (1800) |
| 26th* (1801) | John Bird | Robert Maxwell | Thomas Fitzgerald | George Cummins | John M. Vining | James Sykes Jr. | 26th* (1801) |
| 27th* (1802) | John Bird | John Way | Thomas Fitzgerald | George Cummins | George Truitt | James Sykes Jr. | 27th* (1802) |
| 28th* (1803) | John Bird | John Way | Thomas Fitzgerald | George Cummins | George Truitt | James Sykes Jr. | 28th* (1803) |
| 29th* (1804) | William Cooch | John Way | Thomas Fitzgerald | George Cummins | George Truitt | James Sykes Jr. | 29th* (1804) |
| 30th* (1805) | George Clark Jr. | John Way | Thomas Fitzgerald | George Cummins | George Truitt | James Sykes Jr. | 30th* (1805) |
| 31st* (1806) | George Clark Jr. | John Way | Thomas Perkins | George Cummins | George Truitt | James Sykes Jr. | 31st* (1806) |
| 32nd* (1807) | John Merritt | John Way | Thomas Perkins | George Cummins | Thomas Clayton | James Sykes Jr. | 32nd* (1807) |
| 33rd* (1808) | John Merritt | John Way | Thomas Perkins | George Cummins | John Lockwood | James Sykes Jr. | 33rd* (1808) |
| 34th* (1809) | John Merritt | John Way | Andrew Reynolds | George Cummins | John Lockwood | James Sykes Jr. | 34th* (1809) |
| 35th* (1810) | Francis H. Haughey | John Way | Andrew Reynolds | George Cummins | John Lockwood | James Sykes Jr. | 35th* (1810) |
| 36th* (1811) | Francis H. Haughey | John Way | Andrew Reynolds | George Cummins | Andrew Barratt | James Sykes Jr. | 36th* (1811) |
| 37th* (1812) | Francis H. Haughey | John Way | Samuel H. Black | George Cummins | Andrew Barratt | James Morris | 37th* (1812) |
| 38th* (1813) | Abraham Staats | John Way | Samuel H. Black | George Cummins | Andrew Barratt | James Morris | 38th* (1813) |
| 39th* (1814) | Abraham Staats | Caesar A. Rodney | Samuel H. Black | George Cummins | Henry Molleston | James Morris | 39th* (1814) |
| 40th* (1815) | Abraham Staats | Caesar A. Rodney | Nicholas Van Dyke Jr. | George Cummins | Henry Molleston | Jacob Stout | 40th* (1815) |
| 41st* (1816) | George Clark Jr. | Caesar A. Rodney | Nicholas Van Dyke Jr. | George Cummins | Henry Molleston | Jacob Stout | 41st* (1816) |
| 42nd* (1817) | George Clark Jr. | Samuel H. Black | Andrew Gray | George Cummins | Henry Molleston | Jacob Stout | 42nd* (1817) |
| 43rd* (1818) | George Clark Jr. | Samuel H. Black | Andrew Gray | George Cummins | Henry Molleston | Jacob Stout | 43rd* (1818) |
| 44th* (1819) | Jacob Vandegrift | Samuel H. Black | Andrew Gray | George Cummins | Henry Molleston; John Mitchell | Jacob Stout | 44th* (1819) |
| 45th* (1820) | Jacob Vandegrift | Samuel H. Black | Victor du Pont | George Cummins | Enoch Joyce; Thomas Clayton | Jacob Stout | 45th* (1820) |
| 46th* (1821) | Jacob Vandegrift | Charles Thomas Jr. | Victor du Pont | George Cummins | Thomas Clayton | Manlove Hayes | 46th* (1821) |
| 47th* (1822) | William Weldon, II | Charles Thomas Jr. | Victor du Pont | Willard Hall | Thomas Clayton | Manlove Hayes | 47th* (1822) |
| 48th* (1823) | William Weldon, II | Charles Thomas Jr. | John Erwin | Willard Hall; John Cummins | William W. Morris | Manlove Hayes | 48th* (1823) |
| 49th* (1824) | William Weldon, II | Henry Whiteley | John Erwin | George Cummins | William W. Morris | Charles Polk Jr. | 49th* (1824) |
| 50th* (1825) | Christopher Vandegrift | Henry Whiteley | John Erwin | Presley Spruance Jr. | William W. Morris | Charles Polk Jr. | 50th* (1825) |
| 51st* (1826) | Christopher Vandegrift | Henry Whiteley | Joseph England | Presley Spruance Jr. | John Brinckle | Charles Polk Jr. | 51st* (1826) |
| 52nd* (1827) | Levi Boulden | Thomas Deakyne | John Harlan | Presley Spruance Jr. | Elais Naudain Jr. | Joseph G. Oliver | 52nd* (1827) |
| 53rd* (1828) | Levi Boulden | Thomas Deakyne | John Harlan | Presley Spruance Jr. | Elais Naudain Jr. | Joseph G. Oliver | 53rd* (1828) |
| 54th* (1829) | John Caulk | Thomas Deakyne | William T. Read | Presley Spruance Jr. | William Johnson | James P. Lofland | 54th* (1829) |
| 55th* (1830) | John Caulk | Jacob Alrichs | William T. Read | Presley Spruance Jr. | William Johnson | James P. Lofland | 55th* (1830) |
| 56th* (1831) | James Booth | Jacob Alrichs | John Sutton | Thomas Wainwright | William Johnson | James P. Lofland | 56th* (1831) |
