= Outline of Delaware =

U.S. State

The flag of Delaware

The seal of Delaware

The location of the state of Delaware in the United States of America

The following outline is provided as an overview of and topical guide to the U.S. state of Delaware:

Delaware – U.S. state located on the Atlantic Coast of the United States. The state takes its name from Thomas West, 3rd Baron De La Warr, a British nobleman and Virginia's first colonial governor, after whom (what is now called) Cape Henlopen was originally named. Delaware is the second smallest state (after Rhode Island). The history of the state's economic and industrial development is closely tied to the impact of the Du Pont family, founder of E. I. du Pont de Nemours and Company, one of the world's largest chemical companies. Delaware was one of the 13 original states participating in the American Revolution and on December 7, 1787, became the first to ratify the Constitution of the United States.

== General reference ==
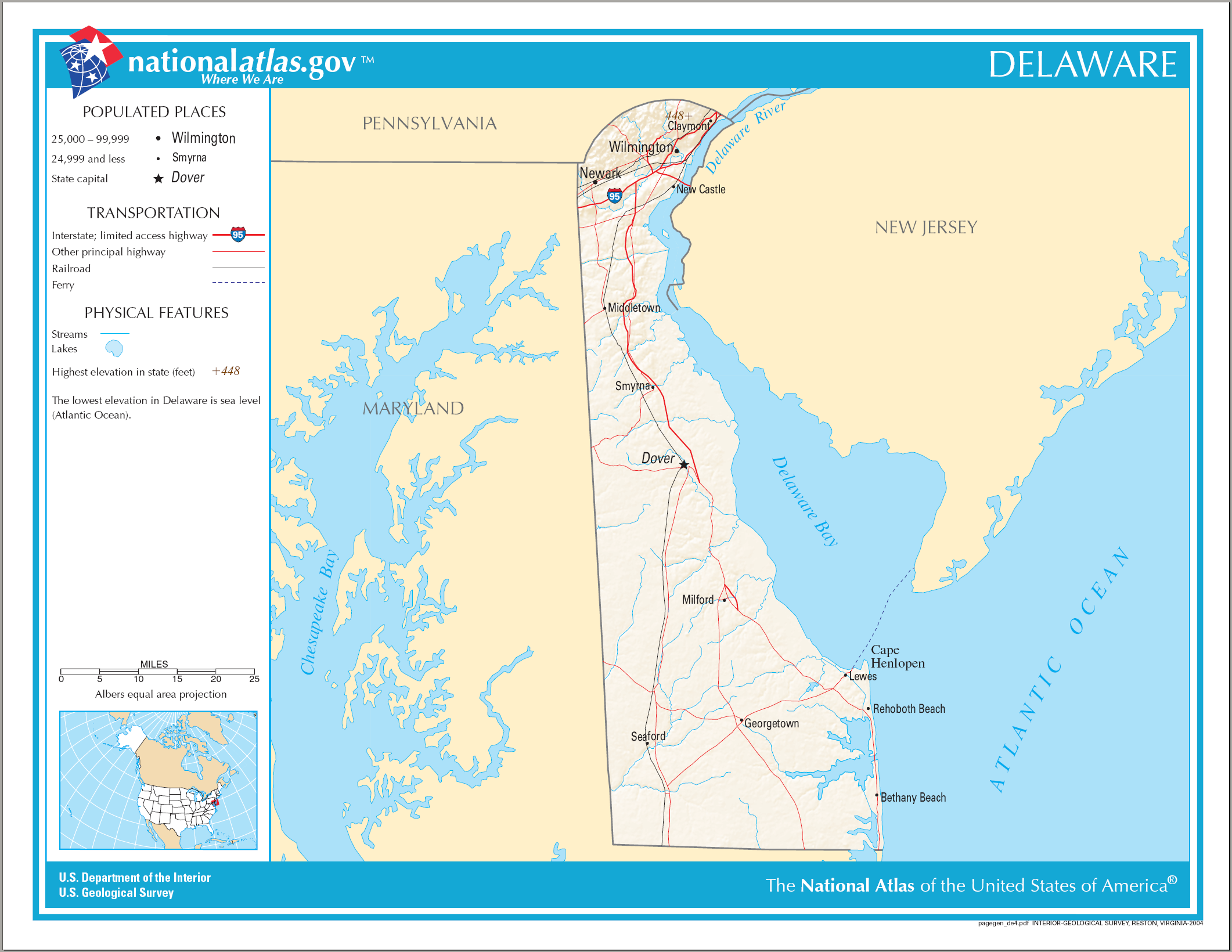
An enlargeable map of the state of Delaware

- Names
  - Common name: Delaware
    - Pronunciation: /ˈdɛləwɛər/ DEL-ə-wair
  - Official name: State of Delaware
  - Abbreviations and name codes
    - Postal symbol: DE
    - ISO 3166-2 code: US-DE
    - Internet second-level domain: .de.us
  - Nicknames
    - Chemical Capital
    - Corporate Capital (due to the state's business-friendly laws)
    - Diamond State (allusion to the state flag)
    - Blue Hen State or Blue Hen Chicken State
    - The First State (Delaware was the first state to ratify the Constitution; currently used on license plates)
    - Home of Tax Free Shopping
    - New Sweden
    - Peach State
    - Small Wonder
    - Uncle Sam's Pocket Handkerchief
- Adjectival: Delaware
- Demonym: Delawarean

== Geography of Delaware ==
Geography of Delaware

- Delaware is: a U.S. state, a federal state of the United States of America
- Location:
  - Northern Hemisphere
  - Western Hemisphere
    - Americas
      - North America
        - Anglo America
        - Northern America
          - United States of America
            - Contiguous United States
              - Eastern United States
                - East Coast of the United States
                  - Northeast megalopolis
                - Mid-Atlantic states
                - South Atlantic States
- Population of Delaware: 897,934 (2010 U.S. Census)
- Area of Delaware: 2,490 sq mi (6,450 km^{2})
- Atlas of Delaware

=== Places in Delaware ===
Places in Delaware

- Historic places in Delaware
  - National Historic Landmarks in Delaware
  - National Register of Historic Places listings in Delaware
    - Bridges on the National Register of Historic Places in Delaware
- National Natural Landmarks in Delaware
- National parks in Delaware: First State National Historical Park. See List of areas in the United States National Park System.
- State parks in Delaware

=== Environment of Delaware ===
- Climate of Delaware
- Delaware State Wildlife Areas
- Fishing in Delaware
- Geology of Delaware
- Protected areas in Delaware
  - State forests of Delaware
- Superfund sites in Delaware

==== Natural geographic features of Delaware ====
- Rivers of Delaware

=== Regions of Delaware ===
==== Administrative divisions of Delaware ====
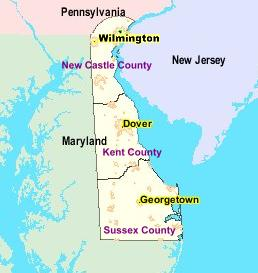
An enlargeable map of the 3 counties of the state of Delaware

- The three counties of the state of Delaware
  - Municipalities in Delaware
    - Cities in Delaware (comingled with other municipalities)
      - State capital of Delaware:
      - City nicknames in Delaware
      - Sister cities in Delaware
    - Towns in Delaware (comingled with other municipalities)

=== Demography of Delaware ===
Demographics of Delaware

== Government and politics of Delaware ==
Politics of Delaware

- Form of government: U.S. state government
- Delaware's congressional delegations
- Delaware State Capitol
- Elections in Delaware
- Political party strength in Delaware

=== Branches of the government of Delaware ===
Government of Delaware

==== Executive branch of the government of Delaware ====
- Governor of Delaware
  - Lieutenant Governor of Delaware
  - Secretary of State of Delaware
- State departments
  - Delaware Department of Transportation

==== Legislative branch of the government of Delaware ====
- List of United States senators from Delaware
- List of United States representatives from Delaware
- Delaware General Assembly
  - 1st Delaware General Assembly
  - 2nd Delaware General Assembly
  - 3rd Delaware General Assembly
  - 4th Delaware General Assembly
  - 5th Delaware General Assembly
  - 6th Delaware General Assembly
  - 7th Delaware General Assembly
  - 8th Delaware General Assembly
  - 9th Delaware General Assembly
  - 10th Delaware General Assembly
  - 11th Delaware General Assembly
  - 12th Delaware General Assembly
  - 13th Delaware General Assembly
  - 14th Delaware General Assembly
  - 15th Delaware General Assembly
  - 16th Delaware General Assembly
  - 17th Delaware General Assembly
  - 18th Delaware General Assembly
  - 19th Delaware General Assembly
  - 20th Delaware General Assembly
  - 21st Delaware General Assembly
  - 22nd Delaware General Assembly
  - 23rd Delaware General Assembly
  - 24th Delaware General Assembly
  - 25th Delaware General Assembly
  - 26th Delaware General Assembly
  - 27th Delaware General Assembly
  - 28th Delaware General Assembly
  - 29th Delaware General Assembly
  - 30th Delaware General Assembly
  - 31st Delaware General Assembly
  - 32nd Delaware General Assembly
  - 33rd Delaware General Assembly
  - 34th Delaware General Assembly
  - 35th Delaware General Assembly
  - 36th Delaware General Assembly
  - 37th Delaware General Assembly
  - 38th Delaware General Assembly
  - 39th Delaware General Assembly
  - 40th Delaware General Assembly
  - 41st Delaware General Assembly
  - 42nd Delaware General Assembly
  - 43rd Delaware General Assembly
  - 44th Delaware General Assembly
  - 45th Delaware General Assembly
  - 46th Delaware General Assembly
  - 47th Delaware General Assembly
  - 48th Delaware General Assembly
  - 49th Delaware General Assembly
  - 50th Delaware General Assembly
  - 51st Delaware General Assembly
  - 52nd Delaware General Assembly
  - 53rd Delaware General Assembly
  - 54th Delaware General Assembly
  - 55th Delaware General Assembly
  - 56th Delaware General Assembly
  - 57th Delaware General Assembly
  - 58th Delaware General Assembly
  - 59th Delaware General Assembly
  - 60th Delaware General Assembly
  - 61st Delaware General Assembly
  - 62nd Delaware General Assembly
  - 63rd Delaware General Assembly
  - 64th Delaware General Assembly
  - 65th Delaware General Assembly
  - 66th Delaware General Assembly
  - 67th Delaware General Assembly
  - 68th Delaware General Assembly
  - 69th Delaware General Assembly
  - 70th Delaware General Assembly
- Delaware Senate
- Delaware House of Representatives
- List of Delaware General Assembly sessions

==== Judicial branch of the government of Delaware ====
Courts of Delaware

- Supreme Court of Delaware

=== Law and order in Delaware ===
- Cannabis in Delaware
- Capital punishment in Delaware: yes. See Capital punishment in the United States.
  - Individuals executed in Delaware
- Constitution of Delaware
- Crime in Delaware
- Gun laws in Delaware
- Law enforcement in Delaware
  - Law enforcement agencies in Delaware
    - Delaware State Police
- Same-sex marriage in Delaware
- Delaware General Corporation Law

=== Military in Delaware ===
- Delaware National Guard
  - Delaware Air National Guard
  - Delaware Army National Guard

== History of Delaware ==
History of Delaware

=== History of Delaware, by period ===
The location of the state of Delaware in the United States of America

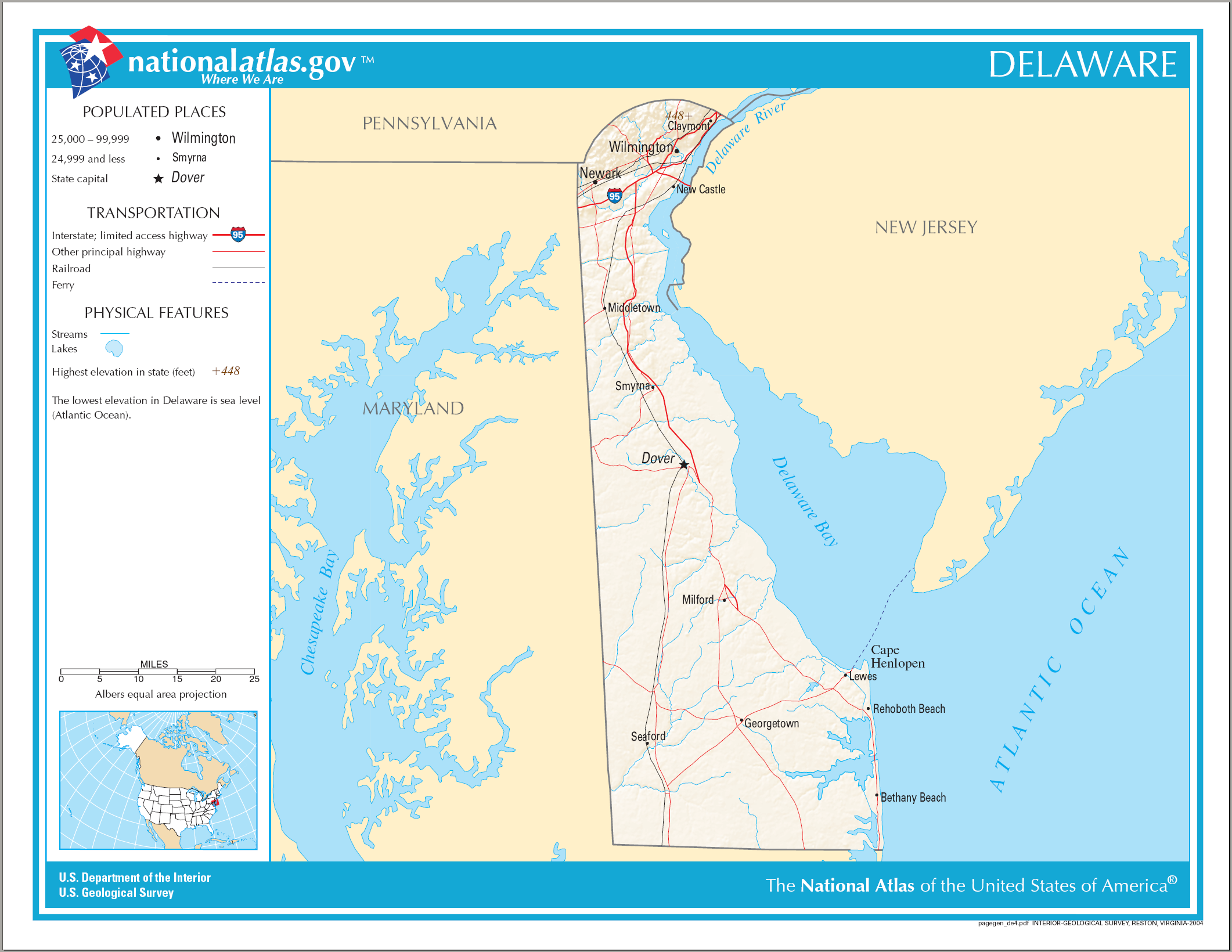
An enlargeable map of the state of Delaware

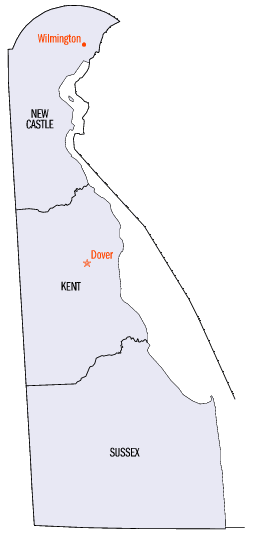
An enlargeable map of the 3 counties of the state of Delaware

- Indigenous peoples
- Netherlands colony of Nieuw-Nederland, 1624–1652
- Swedish colony of Nya Sverige, 1638–1655
- Netherlands province of Nieuw-Nederland, 1652–1664
- English Province of New-York, (1664–1681)-1688
- English Colony of Pennsylvania, 1681–1707
  - Lower Counties on the Delaware, 1704–1776
- British Colony of Pennsylvania, 1707–1776
  - Lower Counties on the Delaware, 1704–1776
  - French and Indian War, 1754–1763
    - Treaty of Paris of 1763
- American Revolutionary War, April 19, 1775 – September 3, 1783
  - United States Declaration of Independence, July 4, 1776
  - Treaty of Paris, September 3, 1783
- State of Delaware since 1776
    - Twelfth state to ratify the Articles of Confederation and Perpetual Union, signed February 22, 1779
  - First State to ratify the Constitution of the United States of America on December 7, 1787
  - American Civil War, April 12, 1861 – May 13, 1865
    - Delaware in the American Civil War
    - Border state, 1861–1865
- Effects of Hurricane Isabel in Delaware

=== History of Delaware, by region ===
==== Cities ====
- History of Dover

==== Counties ====
- History of Kent County
- History of New Castle County
- History of Sussex County

== Culture of Delaware ==
Culture of Delaware

- Festivals in Delaware
- Museums in Delaware
- Religion in Delaware
  - The Church of Jesus Christ of Latter-day Saints in Delaware
  - Episcopal Diocese of Delaware
- Scouting in Delaware
- State symbols of Delaware
  - Flag of the State of Delaware
  - Great Seal of the State of Delaware

=== The Arts in Delaware ===
- Music of Delaware

=== Sports in Delaware ===
Sports in Delaware

- Professional sports teams in Delaware

== Economy and infrastructure of Delaware ==
Economy of Delaware

- Fishing in Delaware
- Communications in Delaware
  - Newspapers in Delaware
  - Radio stations in Delaware
  - Television stations in Delaware
- Health care in Delaware
  - Hospitals in Delaware
- Transportation in Delaware
  - Airports in Delaware
  - Delaware State Route System
    - Numbered routes in Delaware
    - Delaware Byways
  - Vehicle registration plates of Delaware

== Education in Delaware ==
Education in Delaware

- Schools in Delaware
  - School districts in Delaware
    - High schools in Delaware
  - Colleges and universities in Delaware
    - University of Delaware
    - Delaware State University

== See also ==
- Topic overview:
  - Delaware
  - Index of Delaware-related articles
