= 25th Delaware General Assembly =

American legislative session

←	24th	26th	→

Overview
- Legislative body: Delaware General Assembly
- Term: January 6, 1801 – January 5, 1802

The 25th Delaware General Assembly was a meeting of the legislative power of the Delaware state, consisting of the Delaware State Senate and the Delaware House of Representatives. Elections were held the first Tuesday of October and terms began on the first Tuesday in January. The Assembly met in the state capital, Dover, convening January 6, 1801, two weeks before the beginning of the third year of the administration of Governor Richard Bassett. He resigned February 20, 1801, and James Sykes completed his term.

The apportionment of seats was permanently assigned to three senators and seven representatives for each of the three counties. Population of the county did not effect the number of delegates. Both chambers had a Federalist majority.

== Leadership ==
=== Senate ===
- James Sykes, Kent County

=== House of Representatives ===
- Stephen Lewis, Kent County

== Members ==
=== Senate ===
Senators were elected by the public for a three-year term, one third posted each year.

New Castle County

- John Bird
- Thomas Fitzgerald
- Isaac Grantham

Kent County

- James Raymond
- James Sykes
- John Vining

Sussex County

- Charles Draper
- Nathaniel Hayes
- David Owens

=== House of Representatives ===
Representatives were elected by the public for a one-year term.

New Castle County

- Levi Adams
- John C. Brush
- George Clark Jr.
- Joseph England
- Caesar Augustus Rodney
- William C. Simonton
- John Way

Kent County

- George Cummins
- Manlove Emerson
- Stephen Lewis
- Henry Molleston
- Nicholas Ridgely
- William Sorden
- William Warner

Sussex County

- Elijah Adams
- Jesse Green
- Outerbridge Horsey
- Armwell Long
- Peter Robinson
- George Waller
- Jacob Wolfe

== Places with more information ==
- Delaware Historical Society; website; 505 North Market Street, Wilmington, Delaware 19801; (302) 655-7161.
- University of Delaware; Library website; 181 South College Avenue, Newark, Delaware 19717; (302) 831-2965.
