= 22nd Delaware General Assembly =

American legislative session

←	21st	23rd	→

Overview
- Legislative body: Delaware General Assembly
- Term: January 2, 1798 – January 1, 1799

The 22nd Delaware General Assembly was a meeting of the legislative branch of the state government, consisting of the Delaware Senate and the Delaware House of Representatives. Elections were held the first Tuesday of October and terms began on the first Tuesday in January. It met in Dover, Delaware, convening January 2, 1798, two weeks before the beginning of the only full year of the administration of Governor Daniel Rogers.

The apportionment of seats was permanently assigned to three senators and seven representatives for each of the three counties. Population of the county did not effect the number of delegates. Both chambers had a Federalist majority.

== Leadership ==
=== Senate ===
- Isaac Davis, Kent County

=== House of Representatives ===
- Stephen Lewis, Kent County

== Members ==
=== Senate ===
Senators were elected by the public for a three-year term, one third posted each year.

New Castle County

- Archibald Alexander
- John James
- Edward Roche

Kent County

- George Cummins
- Isaac Davis
- James Sykes Jr.

Sussex County

- unknown
- Nathaniel Hayes
- Woodman Stockley

=== House of Representatives ===
Representatives were elected by the public for a one-year term.

New Castle County

- Robert Armstrong
- Richard C. Dale
- William Johnson
- Joel Lewis
- Caesar Augustus Rodney
- James Stroud
- Nehemiah Tilton

Kent County

- Joseph Barker
- Peter Caverly
- Manlove Emerson
- Stephen Lewis
- James Raymond
- Nicholas Ridgely
- William Warner

Sussex County

- Joshua Burton
- Jesse Green
- David Owens
- Samuel Paynter
- Thomas Robertson
- Thomas Sorden
- William H. Wells

== Places with more information ==
- Delaware Historical Society; website; 505 North Market Street, Wilmington, Delaware 19801; (302) 655-7161.
- University of Delaware; Library website; 181 South College Avenue, Newark, Delaware 19717; (302) 831-2965.
