= 26th Delaware General Assembly =

American legislative session

←	25th	27th	→

Overview
- Legislative body: Delaware General Assembly
- Term: January 5, 1802 – January 4, 1803

The 26th Delaware General Assembly was a meeting of the legislative power of the state, consisting of the Delaware Senate and the Delaware House of Representatives. Elections were held the first Tuesday of October and terms began on the first Tuesday in January. It met in Dover, Delaware, convening January 5, 1802, two weeks before the beginning of the first year of the administration of Governor David Hall.

The apportionment of seats was permanently assigned to three senators and seven representatives for each of the three counties. Population of the county did not effect the number of delegates. Both chambers had a Federalist majority.

== Leadership ==
=== Senate ===
- Daniel Rogers, Kent County

=== House of Representatives ===
- Stephen Lewis, Kent County

== Members ==
=== Senate ===
Senators were elected by the public for a three-year term, one third posted each year.

New Castle County

- John Bird
- Thomas Fitzgerald
- Robert Maxwell

Kent County

- George Cummins
- James Sykes Jr.
- John Vining

Sussex County

- Charles Draper
- Nathaniel Hayes
- Daniel Rogers

=== House of Representatives ===
Representatives were elected by the public for a one-year term.

New Castle County

- George Clark Jr.
- William Cooch
- Joseph England
- Philip Lewis
- Caesar A. Rodney
- Abraham Staats
- Adam Williamson

Kent County

- James Henry
- Stephen Lewis
- John Marim
- Henry Molleston
- Nicholas Ridgely
- William Sorden
- William Warner

Sussex County

- Elijah Adams
- Jesse Green
- Outerbridge Horsey
- Armwell Long
- Peter Robinson
- Caleb Rodney
- George Waller

== Places with more information ==
- Delaware Historical Society; website; 505 North Market Street, Wilmington, Delaware 19801; (302) 655-7161.
- University of Delaware; Library website; 181 South College Avenue, Newark, Delaware 19717; (302) 831-2965.
