= 1798 Delaware gubernatorial election =

- October 2, 1798
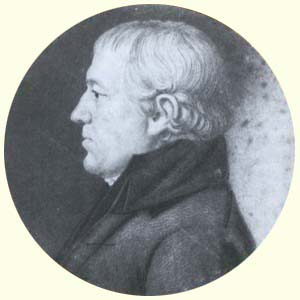

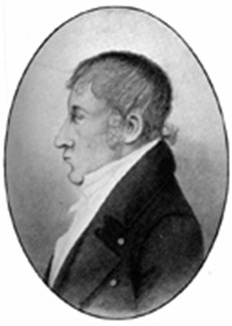
| Nominee | Richard Bassett | David Hall |
| Party | Federalist | Democratic-Republican |
| Popular vote | 2,490 | 2,068 |
| Percentage | 52.50% | 43.60% |
- Bassett: 50–60%
Governor before election
Daniel Rogers (acting)
Federalist
Elected Governor
Richard Bassett
Federalist

The 1798 Delaware gubernatorial election was held on October 2, 1798. The Federalist chief justice of the Delaware Court of Common Pleas Richard Bassett defeated the Democratic-Republican candidate David Hall.

== General election ==
=== Results ===
1798 Delaware gubernatorial election
| Party | Candidate | Votes | % | ±% |
|---|---|---|---|---|
| Federalist | Richard Bassett | 2,490 | 52.50 | ▲0.16 |
| Democratic-Republican | David Hall | 2,068 | 43.60 | ▼4.06 |
| Federalist | Barclay Townsend | 185 | 3.90 | |
| Total votes | | 4,743 | 100.00 | |
| Federalist hold | | | | |

=== Results by county ===
1798 Delaware gubernatorial election by county
| County | Richard Bassett Federalist | | David Hall Democratic-Republican | | Barclay Townsend Federalist | | Margin | | Total |
| County | # | % | # | % | # | % | # | % | Total |
|---|---|---|---|---|---|---|---|---|---|
| Kent | 882 | 54.3 | 742 | 45.7 | — | | 140 | 8.6 | 1,624 |
| New Castle | 497 | 50.9 | 479 | 49.1 | — | | 18 | 1.8 | 976 |
| Sussex | 1,111 | 51.8 | 847 | 39.5 | 185 | 8.6 | 264 | 12.3 | 2,143 |
| TOTAL | 2,490 | 52.5 | 2,068 | 43.6 | 185 | 3.9 | 422 | 8.9 | 4,743 |

Counties that flipped from Democratic-Republican to Federalist

- New Castle

== Bibliography ==
- Dubin, Michael J. (2003). United States Gubernatorial Elections, 1776-1860: The Official Results by State and County. Jefferson, NC: McFarland and Company. ISBN 978-0-7864-1439-0.
- Lampi, Philip J. (2012). "Delaware 1798 Governor". A New Nation Votes. American Antiquarian Society.
