= 23rd Delaware General Assembly =

American legislative session

←	22nd	24th	→

Overview
- Legislative body: Delaware General Assembly
- Term: January 1, 1799 – January 7, 1800

The 23rd Delaware General Assembly was a meeting of the legislative branch of the state government, consisting of the Delaware Senate and the Delaware House of Representatives. Elections were held the first Tuesday of October and terms began on the first Tuesday in January. The Assembly met in the state capital, Dover, convening January 1, 1799, two weeks before the beginning of the first year of the administration of Governor Richard Bassett.

The apportionment of seats was permanently assigned to three senators and seven representatives for each of the three counties. Population of the county did not effect the number of delegates. Both chambers had a Federalist majority.

== Leadership ==
=== Senate ===
- Isaac Davis, Kent County

=== House of Representatives ===
- Stephen Lewis, Kent County

== Members ==
=== Senate ===
Senators were elected by the public for a three-year term, one third posted each year.

New Castle County

- Archibald Alexander
- Isaac Grantham
- John James

Kent County

- George Cummins
- Isaac Davis
- James Sykes

Sussex County

- unknown
- Nathaniel Hayes
- David Owens

=== House of Representatives ===
Representatives were elected by the public for a one-year term.

New Castle County

- John Clark
- Richard C. Dale
- George Gillespie
- Thomas Kean
- Caesar Augustus Rodney
- Joseph Tatnall
- Nicholas Van Dyke Jr.

Kent County

- Joseph Barker
- William Collins Jr.
- Manlove Emerson
- Stephen Lewis
- William Sorden
- John Vining
- William Warner

Sussex County

- Isaac Beauchamp
- Joshua Burton
- Samuel Paynter
- Thomas Robertson
- Thomas Sorden
- Stephen Styer
- William H. Wells

== Places with more information ==
- Delaware Historical Society; website; 505 North Market Street, Wilmington, Delaware 19801; (302) 655-7161.
- University of Delaware; Library website; 181 South College Avenue, Newark, Delaware 19717; (302) 831-2965.
