= 30th Delaware General Assembly =

American legislative session

←	29th	31st	→

Overview
- Legislative body: Delaware General Assembly
- Term: January 7, 1806 – January 6, 1807

The 30th Delaware General Assembly was a meeting of the legislative branch of the state government, consisting of the Delaware Senate and the Delaware House of Representatives. Elections were held the first Tuesday of October and terms began on the first Tuesday in January. It met in Dover, Delaware, convening January 7, 1806, two weeks before the beginning of the second year of the administration of Governor Nathaniel Mitchell.

The apportionment of seats was permanently assigned to three senators and seven representatives for each of the three counties. Population of the county did not affect the number of delegates. Both chambers had a Federalist majority.

== Leadership ==
=== Senate ===
- James Sykes Jr., Kent County

=== House of Representatives ===
- Jesse Green, Sussex County

== Members ==
=== Senate ===
Senators were elected by the public for a three-year term, one third posted each year.

New Castle County

- George Clark Jr.
- Thomas Fitzgerald
- John Way

Kent County

- George Cummins
- James Sykes Jr.
- George Truitt

Sussex County

- Charles Draper
- Caleb Rodney
- Daniel Rogers

=== House of Representatives ===
Representatives were elected by the public for a one-year term.

New Castle County

- John Bird
- George Gillespie
- Dr. William Hazlett
- John Merritt
- Thomas Perkins
- Andrew Reynolds
- Isaac Starr

Kent County

- Thomas Clayton
- Robert Cook
- William Hughlett
- John Marim
- Henry Molleston
- James B. Ralston
- William Warner

Sussex County

- Joshua Burton
- Thomas Cooper
- Edward Dingle Jr.
- Jesse Green
- Thomas Laws
- Isaac Marshall
- George Waller

== Places with more information ==
- Delaware Historical Society; website; 505 North Market Street, Wilmington, Delaware 19801; (302) 655-7161.
- University of Delaware; Library website; 181 South College Avenue, Newark, Delaware 19717; (302) 831–2965.
