= 29th Delaware General Assembly =

American legislative session

←	28th	30th	→

Overview
- Legislative body: Delaware General Assembly
- Term: January 1, 1805 – January 7, 1806

The 29th Delaware General Assembly was a meeting of the legislative branch of the government of the American state of Delaware, consisting of the Delaware Senate and the Delaware House of Representatives. Elections were held the first Tuesday of October and terms began on the first Tuesday in January. It met in Dover, Delaware, convening January 1, 1805, two weeks before the beginning of the first year of the administration of Governor Nathaniel Mitchell.

The apportionment of seats was permanently assigned to three senators and seven representatives for each of the three counties. Population of the county did not effect the number of delegates. Both chambers had a Federalist majority.

== Leadership ==
=== Senate ===
- James Sykes Jr., Kent County

=== House of Representatives ===
- Thomas Laws, Sussex County

== Members ==
=== Senate ===
Senators were elected by the public for a three-year term, one third posted each year.

New Castle County

- William Cooch
- Thomas Fitzgerald
- John Way

Kent County

- George Cummins
- James Sykes Jr.
- George Truitt

Sussex County

- Charles Draper
- Peter Robinson
- Daniel Rogers

=== House of Representatives ===
Representatives were elected by the public for a one-year term.

New Castle County

- John Bird
- Peter Brynberg
- Jesse Higgins
- Morgan Jones
- Thomas Perkins
- James Snow
- Abraham Staats

Kent County

- Thomas Clayton
- James Henry
- Stephen Lewis
- John Marim
- Henry Molleston
- William Sorden
- William Warner

Sussex County

- Thomas Cooper
- Edward Dingle Jr.
- Thomas Laws
- Armwell Long
- Isaac Marshall
- Caleb Rodney
- George Waller

== Places with more information ==
- Delaware Historical Society; website; 505 North Market Street, Wilmington, Delaware 19801; (302) 655-7161.
- University of Delaware; Library website; 181 South College Avenue, Newark, Delaware 19717; (302) 831–2965.
