= 24th Delaware General Assembly =

American legislative session

←	23rd	25th	→

Overview
- Legislative body: Delaware General Assembly
- Term: January 7, 1800 – January 6, 1801

The 24th Delaware General Assembly was a meeting of the legislative branch of the state government, consisting of the Delaware Senate and the Delaware House of Representatives. Elections were held the first Tuesday of October and terms began on the first Tuesday in January. The Assembly met in the state capital, Dover, convening January 7, 1800, two weeks before the beginning of the second year of the administration of Governor Richard Bassett.

The apportionment of seats was permanently assigned to three senators and seven representatives for each of the three counties. Population of the county did not effect the number of delegates. Both chambers had a Federalist majority.

== Leadership ==
=== Senate ===
- James Sykes, Kent County

=== House of Representatives ===
- Stephen Lewis, Kent County

== Members ==
=== Senate ===
Senators were elected by the public for a three-year term, one third posted each year.

New Castle County

- Archibald Alexander
- Peter Brynberg
- Isaac Grantham

Kent County

- James Raymond
- James Sykes
- John Vining

Sussex County

- Charles Draper
- Nathaniel Hayes
- David Owens

=== House of Representatives ===
Representatives were elected by the public for a one-year term.

New Castle County

- George Clark Jr.
- Joseph England
- Thomas Fitzgerald
- George Gillespie
- William Johnson
- Robert Middleton
- Caesar Augustus Rodney

Kent County

- Manlove Emerson
- James Henry
- Stephen Lewis
- Henry Molleston
- Nicholas Ridgely
- William Sorden
- William Warner

Sussex County

- Elijah Adams
- Joshua Burton
- Samuel Paynter
- Thomas Sorden
- Stephen Styer
- George Waller
- Jacob Wolfe

== Places with more information ==
- Delaware Historical Society; website; 505 North Market Street, Wilmington, Delaware 19801; (302) 655-7161.
- University of Delaware; Library website; 181 South College Avenue, Newark, Delaware 19717; (302) 831-2965.
