= 34th Delaware General Assembly =

American legislative session

←	33rd	35th	→

Overview
- Legislative body: Delaware General Assembly
- Term: January 2, 1810 – January 1, 1811

The 34th Delaware General Assembly was a meeting of the legislative branch of the state government, consisting of the Delaware Senate and the Delaware House of Representatives. Elections were held the first Tuesday of October and terms began on the first Tuesday in January. It met in Dover, Delaware, convening January 2, 1810, two weeks before the beginning of the third year of the administration of Governor George Truitt.

The apportionment of seats was permanently assigned to three senators and seven representatives for each of the three counties. Population of the county did not effect the number of delegates. Both chambers had a Federalist majority.

== Leadership ==
=== Senate ===
- James Sykes Jr., Kent County

=== House of Representatives ===
- Stephen Lewis, Kent County

== Members ==
=== Senate ===
Senators were elected by the public for a three-year term, one third posted each year.

New Castle County

- John Merritt
- Andrew Reynolds
- John Way

Kent County

- George Cummins
- John Lockwood
- James Sykes Jr.

Sussex County

- Thomas Cooper
- Nathaniel Mitchell
- Samuel Paynter

=== House of Representatives ===
Representatives were elected by the public for a one-year term.

New Castle County

- John Bird
- Samuel H. Black
- Benjamin Chambers
- Robert Forwood
- Jesse Higgins
- William D. Phillips
- Enoch Thomas

Kent County

- William Denny
- Stephen Lewis
- John Marim
- Stephen Paradee
- Henry M. Ridgely
- William Warner
- John Williams

Sussex County

- Joshua Burton
- Robert Hill
- Peter Robinson
- Thomas W. Rogers
- Ebe Walter
- John Wilson
- Peter G. Wootten

== Places with more information ==
- Delaware Historical Society; website; 505 North Market Street, Wilmington, Delaware 19801; (302) 655-7161.
- University of Delaware; Library website; 181 South College Avenue, Newark, Delaware 19717; (302) 831–2965.
