= 19th Delaware General Assembly =

American legislative session

←	18th	20th	→

Overview
- Legislative body: Delaware General Assembly
- Term: January 6, 1795 – January 5, 1796

The 19th Delaware General Assembly was a meeting of the legislative branch of the state government, consisting of the Delaware Senate and the Delaware House of Representatives. Elections were held the first Tuesday of October and terms began on the first Tuesday in January. It met in Dover, convening January 6, 1795, two weeks before the beginning of the third year of the administration of Governor Joshua Clayton.

The apportionment of seats was permanently assigned to three senators and seven representatives for each of the three counties. Population of the county did not effect the number of delegates. Both chambers had a Federalist majority.

== Leadership ==
=== Senate ===
- Daniel Rogers, Sussex County

=== House of Representatives ===
- Peter Lowber, Kent County

== Members ==
=== Senate ===
Senators were elected by the public for a three-year term, one third posted each year.

New Castle County

- Isaac Grantham
- Thomas Kean
- John Stockton

Kent County

- Isaac Davis
- Joseph Miller
- James Sykes Jr.

Sussex County

- Thomas Laws
- George Mitchell
- Daniel Rogers

=== House of Representatives ===
Representatives were elected by the public for a one-year term.

New Castle County

- James Black
  - Archibald Allexander
- William Cooch
- William Frazer
- Samuel Hollingsworth
- John James
- William Johnson
- Alexander Porter Jr.

Kent County

- William Adams
- William Allaband
- James Douglass
- Philip Lewis
- Peter Lowber
- James Miller
- Presley Spruance Sr.

Sussex County

- John W. Batson
- Richard Burton
- William Carlisle
- David Nutter
- William Peery
- William H. Wells
- John Williams

== Places with more information ==
- Delaware Historical Society; website; 505 North Market Street, Wilmington, Delaware 19801; (302) 655-7161.
- University of Delaware; Library website; 181 South College Avenue, Newark, Delaware 19717; (302) 831-2965.
