= 18th Delaware General Assembly =

American legislative session

←	17th	19th	→

Overview
- Legislative body: Delaware General Assembly
- Term: January 7, 1794 – January 6, 1795

The 18th Delaware General Assembly was a meeting of the legislative branch of the state government, consisting of the Delaware Senate and the Delaware House of Representatives. Elections were held the first Tuesday of October and terms began on the first Tuesday in January. It met in Dover, convening January 7, 1794, two weeks before the beginning of the second year of the administration of Governor Joshua Clayton.

The apportionment of seats was permanently assigned to three senators and seven representatives for each of the three counties. Population of the county did not effect the number of delegates. Both chambers had a Federalist majority.

== Leadership ==
=== Senate ===
- Daniel Rogers, Sussex County

=== House of Representatives ===
- Stephen Lewis, Kent County

== Members ==
=== Senate ===
Senators were elected by the public for a three-year term, one third posted each year.

New Castle County

- Archibald Alexander
- Isaac Grantham
- Thomas Kean

Kent County

- Isaac Davis
- James Sykes Jr.
- George Wilson

Sussex County

- George Mitchell
- Daniel Polk
- Daniel Rogers

=== House of Representatives ===
Representatives were elected by the public for a one-year term.

New Castle County

- Robert Armstrong
- James Black
- Robert Haughey
- John James
- William Johnson
- William McKennan
- Nehemiah Tilton

Kent County

- Ebenezer Blackiston
- James Henry
- Stephen Lewis
- John Lockwood
- Caleb Sipple
- George Truitt
- William Warner

Sussex County

- John W. Batson
- Nathaniel Hayes
- David Nutter
- William Peery
- Charles Polk Sr.
- John Tennent
- Barclay Townsend

== Places with more information ==
- Delaware Historical Society; website; 505 North Market Street, Wilmington, Delaware 19801; (302) 655-7161.
- University of Delaware; Library website; 181 South College Avenue, Newark, Delaware 19717; (302) 831-2965.
