= 17th Delaware General Assembly =

American legislative session

←	16th	18th	→

Overview
- Legislative body: Delaware General Assembly
- Term: January 1, 1793 – January 7, 1794

The 17th Delaware General Assembly was a meeting of the legislative branch of the state government, consisting of the Delaware Senate and the Delaware House of Representatives. Elections were held the first Tuesday of October and terms began on the first Tuesday in January. It met in Dover, convening January 1, 1793, two weeks before the beginning of the first year of the administration of Governor Joshua Clayton. This was the first application of the Delaware 1792 Constitution.

The apportionment of seats was permanently assigned to three senators and seven representatives for each of the three counties. Population of the county did not effect the number of delegates. Both chambers had a Federalist majority.

== Leadership ==
=== Senate ===
- Daniel Rogers, Sussex County

=== House of Representatives ===
- George Wilson, Kent County
- Stephen Lewis, Kent County

== Members ==
=== Senate ===
Senators were elected by the public for a three-year term, one third posted each year.

New Castle County

- Archibald Alexander
- Robert Haughey
- John Dickinson

Kent County

- James Morris
- John Vining
- Edward White

Sussex County

- Daniel Polk
- Daniel Rogers
- Rhodes Shankland

=== House of Representatives ===
Representatives were elected by the public for a one-year term.

New Castle County

- James Black
- Samuel Hollingsworth
- William Johnson
- George Monro
- Edward Roche
- Joseph Tatnall
- Nehemiah Tilton

Kent County

- Isaac Davis
- Stephen Lewis
- John Lockwood
- James Raymond
- Nicholas Ridgely
- Caleb Sipple
- George Wilson

Sussex County

- John W. Batson
- Nathaniel Hayes
- Hap Hazzard
  - Jacob Hazzard
- William Lockwood
- William Moore
- Woodman Stockley
- Barclay Townsend

== Places with more information ==
- Delaware Historical Society; website; 505 North Market Street, Wilmington, Delaware 19801; (302) 655-7161.
- University of Delaware; Library website; 181 South College Avenue, Newark, Delaware 19717; (302) 831-2965.
