= 31st Delaware General Assembly =

Legislature of Delaware, United States, from 1807–1808

←	30th	32nd	→

Overview
- Legislative body: Delaware General Assembly
- Term: January 6, 1807 – January 5, 1808

The 31st Delaware General Assembly was a meeting of the legislative branch of the state government, consisting of the Delaware Senate and the Delaware House of Representatives. Elections were held the first Tuesday of October and terms began on the first Tuesday in January. It met in Dover, convening January 6, 1807, two weeks before the beginning of the third year of the administration of Governor Nathaniel Mitchell.

The apportionment of seats was permanently assigned to three senators and seven representatives for each of the three counties. Population of the county did not effect the number of delegates. Both chambers had a Federalist majority.

== Leadership ==
=== Senate ===
- James Sykes Jr., Kent County

=== House of Representatives ===
- William Warner, Kent County

== Members ==
=== Senate ===
Senators were elected by the public for a three-year term, one third posted each year.

New Castle County

- George Clark Jr.
- Thomas Perkins
- John Way

Kent County

- George Cummins
- James Sykes Jr.
- George Truitt

Sussex County

- Charles Draper
- Samuel Paynter
- Caleb Rodney

=== House of Representatives ===
Representatives were elected by the public for a one-year term.

New Castle County

- George Gillespie
- Peter Jacquett
- John Merritt
- Patrick O'Flynn
- John R. Phillips
- Leonard Vandergrift
- Peter Williams

Kent County

- Thomas Clayton
- Robert Cook
- William Hughlett
- John Marim
- Henry Molleston
- James B. Ralston
- William Warner

Sussex County

- Joshua Burton
- Thomas Cooper
- Edward Dingle Jr.
- Jesse Green
- Robert Hill
- Nathan Vickers
- George Waller

== Places with more information ==
- Delaware Historical Society; website; 505 North Market Street, Wilmington, Delaware 19801; (302) 655-7161.
- University of Delaware; Library website; 181 South College Avenue, Newark, Delaware 19717; (302) 831–2965.
