= 20th Delaware General Assembly =

American legislative session

←	19th	21st	→

Overview
- Legislative body: Delaware General Assembly
- Term: January 5, 1796 – January 3, 1797

The 20th Delaware General Assembly was a meeting of the legislative branch of the state government, consisting of the Delaware State Senate and the Delaware House of Representatives. Elections were held the first Tuesday of October and terms began on the first Tuesday in January. It met in Dover, convening January 5, 1796, two weeks before the beginning of the first year of the administration of Governor Gunning Bedford Sr.

The apportionment of seats was permanently assigned to three senators and seven representatives for each of the three counties. Population of the county did not effect the number of delegates. Both chambers had a Federalist majority.

== Leadership ==
=== Senate ===
- Daniel Rogers, Sussex County

=== House of Representatives ===
- Stephen Lewis, Kent County

== Members ==
=== Senate ===
Senators were elected by the public for a three-year term, one third posted each year.

New Castle County

- John James
- Thomas Kean
- Alexander Porter Jr.

Kent County

- Isaac Davis
- Joseph Miller
- James Sykes Jr.

Sussex County

- Thomas Laws
- George Mitchell
- Daniel Rogers

=== House of Representatives ===
Representatives were elected by the public for a one-year term.

New Castle County

- William Cooch
- Joel Lewis
- Robert Maxwell
- William McKennan
- Elias Naudain Sr.
- James Stroud
- Nehemiah Tilton

Kent County

- Robert Clark
- George Cummins
- James Henry
- Stephen Lewis
- Abraham Pierce
- James Raymond
- William Sorden

Sussex County

- Elisha Adams
- John W. Batson
- Robert Burton
- William Carlisle
- Nathaniel Hayes
- Barclay Townsend
- William H. Wells

== Places with more information ==
- Delaware Historical Society; website; 505 North Market Street, Wilmington, Delaware 19801; (302) 655-7161.
- University of Delaware; Library website; 181 South College Avenue, Newark, Delaware 19717; (302) 831-2965.
