= 21st Delaware General Assembly =

American legislative session

←	20th	22nd	→

Overview
- Legislative body: Delaware General Assembly
- Term: January 3, 1797 – January 2, 1798

The 21st Delaware General Assembly was a meeting of the legislative branch of the state government, consisting of the Delaware Senate and the Delaware House of Representatives. Elections were held the first Tuesday of October and terms began on the first Tuesday in January. It met in Dover, convening January 3, 1797, two weeks before the beginning of the second year of the administration of Governor Gunning Bedford Sr. After his death on September 18, 1797, Daniel Rogers inherited the position.

The apportionment of seats was permanently assigned to three senators and seven representatives for each of the three counties. Population of the county did not effect the number of delegates. Both chambers had a Federalist majority.

== Leadership ==
=== Senate ===
- Daniel Rogers, Sussex County

=== House of Representatives ===
- Stephen Lewis, Kent County

== Members ==
=== Senate ===
Senators were elected by the public for a three-year term, one third posted each year.

New Castle County

- Archibald Alexander
- John James
- Alexander Porter Jr.

Kent County

- George Cummins
- Isaac Davis
- Joseph Miller

Sussex County

- Nathaniel Hayes
- George Mitchell
- Daniel Rogers

=== House of Representatives ===
Representatives were elected by the public for a one-year term.

New Castle County

- Robert Armstrong
- Joel Lewis
- Robert Maxwell
- Elias Naudain Sr.
- Caesar Augustus Rodney
- James Stroud
- Nehemiah Tilton

Kent County

- Manlove Emerson
- Stephen Lewis
- William Morris
- James Raymond
- Nicholas Ridgely
- William Sorden
- William Warner

Sussex County

- Robert Burton
- David Owens
- Samuel Paynter
- Thomas Sorden
- Woodman Stockley
- William H. Wells
- John Williams

== Places with more information ==
- Delaware Historical Society; website; 505 North Market Street, Wilmington, Delaware 19801; (302) 655-7161.
- University of Delaware; Library website; 181 South College Avenue, Newark, Delaware 19717; (302) 831-2965.
