= Armwell Long =

American army officer (1754–1834)

Member of the Delaware House of Representatives from the Sussex County at-large district
- In office January 7, 1800 – January 1, 1805
- Preceded by: Thomas Sorden
- Succeeded by: Jesse Green
- In office January 5, 1808 – January 3, 1809
- Preceded by: Jesse Green
- Succeeded by: Thomas W. Rogers

Commissioner of the Levy Court
- In office 1798–1802
- Preceded by: Unknown
- Succeeded by: John Morris

Personal details
- Born: February 17, 1754 Worcester County, Maryland, U.S.
- Died: November 22, 1834 (aged 80) Dagsboro Hundred, Delaware, U.S.
- Profession: Military officer; politician

Military service
- Allegiance: United States
- Branch/service: Continental Army; Delaware Militia (10th/12th Regiment)
- Years of service: c. 1770s–1780s (Continental Army); 1807–1817 (Delaware Militia)
- Rank: Lieutenant colonel
- Commands: Delaware 10th/12th Regiment
- Battles/wars: American Revolutionary War; War of 1812; Bombardment of Lewes

Armwell Long (February 17, 1754 – November 22, 1834) was an American military officer and politician. Born in Maryland, he lived most of his life in Delaware, owning a large amount of land in Frankford. He served in the Revolutionary War and later was a lieutenant colonel during the War of 1812, being an important figure in the Bombardment of Lewes. He also served six terms in the Delaware General Assembly as a member of the House of Representatives.

== Early life ==
Long was born in Worcester County, Maryland, on February 17, 1754. He was one of ten children born to David Long and Ann Lockwood. He was an active member of Prince George's Chapel in Dagsboro, Delaware, and married Elizabeth Robinson in July 1773. He served in the Revolutionary War. According to the Delmarva News, he was close friends with George Washington and was alleged to have once outranked Washington, although the latter claim is dubious.

== Career ==
Long lived in what is now Frankford following the war. On April 5, 1790, on Easter Monday, Long was appointed a vestryman at Prince George's Chapel. His family owned the fifth pew at the church until at least 1822. When his father, David, died in 1791, Armwell was named the executor of his will.

Long became commissioner of the Levy Court (Note: The Levy Court was the governing body of the county at the time.) in 1798, and served four years in the position. He later served six terms in the Delaware House of Representatives. Long was first elected to serve in the 24th Delaware General Assembly, in 1800, and was reelected each year until being succeeded by Jesse Green in 1805, during the 29th Delaware General Assembly. He was elected for one more term in 1808, being both the successor and predecessor to Green.

On April 18, 1806, the Delaware Militia was created by an Act of Congress. On October 5, in the following year, Long was appointed lieutenant colonel of the 10th Delaware Regiment by governor Nathaniel Mitchell. He was later switched to the 12th Regiment by Joseph Haslet, making Long the controller of ensign Joseph V. Crockett, lieutenant Benjamin Burton, and an additional 66 privates and non-commissioned officers.

In April 1813, as part of the War of 1812, the town of Lewes was being bombarded by the British. Long, who had become commander of the 10th Regiment again, was ordered by the United States Secretary of War to report to General Joseph Bloomfield in New Castle as quickly as possible. Long and his regiment were then sent to Lewes, and he served as an important figure in protecting the town and driving back the British.

Long was officially recommissioned lieutenant colonel on October 15, 1814, and was reappointed commander of his regiment. He finished his military service in the Delaware Militia in 1817. There were claims that he had been injured in the War of 1812, and although he did need a cane or wheelchair to move around in the subsequent years of his life, this was not true.

== Later life and death ==
Long was very wealthy, and lived with his wife on a large piece of land called the "Forest Flower," which he had inherited from his father. His family had been given that land originally in 1682, as a grant from Lord Baltimore. One map from 1818 showed Long as owning all of the space on one side of Frankford's main street. Some said that it was possible to "walk from Selbyville to Frankford on Colonel Armwell Long's property."

Long was the leader of his family and was described as being a "very influential man in Delaware affairs," with mentions of him being on numerous county and state records. His descendants were also prominent in the lower part of Delaware, with Fred Travers of the Delmarva News writing, "The history of Southeastern Sussex County and descendants of Armwell Long are intertwined over and over." One of his sons, Isaiah (1783–1832), was the first Frankford merchant and has been called the town's "founding father."

Long died on November 22, 1834, at the age of 80. His personal items and lands were divided among his children after his death. He was buried in his family's burial grounds, which were later made into a public cemetery named "Colonel Armwell Long Cemetery" in his honor in 1927. He also had a chapter in the Daughters of the American Revolution named for him. A book about Sussex County described Long as "a great man."
