= 58th Delaware General Assembly =

American legislative session

←	57th	59th	→

Overview
- Legislative body: Delaware General Assembly
- Term: January 6, 1835 – January 3, 1837

The 58th Delaware General Assembly (1835–1837) was a meeting of the legislative branch of the state government, consisting of the Delaware Senate and the Delaware House of Representatives. Elections were held the first Tuesday after November 1 and terms began on the first Tuesday in January. It met in Dover, Delaware, convening January 6, 1835, two weeks before the beginning of the third and fourth years of the administration of Governor Caleb P. Bennett. He died July 11, 1836, and replaced the remainder of the fourth year by Governor Charles Polk Jr.

The apportionment of seats was permanently assigned to three senators and seven representatives for each of the three counties. Population of the county did not effect the number of delegates. Both chambers had a Whig majority.

== Leadership ==
=== Senate ===
- Charles Polk Jr., Sussex County

=== House of Representatives ===
- William D. Waples, Sussex County

== Members ==
=== Senate ===
Senators were elected by the public for a four-year term, some elected each two year.

New Castle County

- John D. Dilworth
- Archibald Hamilton
- Thomas W. Handy

Kent County

- Charles Polk Jr.
- Joseph Smithers
- Presley Spruance Jr.

Sussex County

- Joshua Burton
- David Hazzard
- Henry F. Rodney

=== House of Representatives ===
Representatives were elected by the public for a term, every two years.

New Castle County

- Alexander M. Biddle
- William Booth
- Thomas Deakyne
- John W. Evans
- John Harlan
- William Herdman
- George Lodge

Kent County

- Jacob Boone
- Joel Clements
- Philip Fiddeman
- Robert Frame
- Benjamin Harrington
- Charles Marin
- John Raymond

Sussex County

- William B. Cooper
- Thomas Davis
- Thomas Jacobs
- Joshua Johnson Sr.
- Kendall M. Lewis
- James Parker
- William D. Waples

== Places with more information ==
- Delaware Historical Society; website; 505 North Market Street, Wilmington, Delaware 19801; (302) 655-7161.
- University of Delaware; Library website; 181 South College Avenue, Newark, Delaware 19717; (302) 831-2965.
