= Fishing in Delaware =

Delaware, United States has several bodies of water to fish, both fresh and salt water. The state borders the Atlantic Ocean, and contains many small freshwater ponds and rivers.

== Freshwater ==
The following is a list of freshwater bodies of water by county operated by the state:

Sussex County

- Abbotts Pond
- Blairs Pond
- Chipmans Pond
- Concord Pond
- Craigs Pond
- Griffith Lake
- Haven Lake
- Hearns Pond
- Horseys Pond
- Ingrams Pond
- Millsboro Pond
- Portsville Pond
- Raccoon Pond
- Records Pond
- Silver Lake (Milford)
- Trap Pond (state park)
- Trussum Pond
- Tussock Pond
- Wagamons Pond
- Waples Pond

Kent County

- Andrews Lake
- Courseys Pond
- Derby Pond
- Garrisons Lake
- Killens Pond (state park)
- Masseys Mill Pond
- McColleys Pond
- McGinnis Pond
- Moores Lake
- Mud Mill Pond
- Tub Mill Pond

New Castle County

- Becks Pond
- Lums Pond (state park)

=== Other ===
Tidburry Creek located in Kent County contains stocked Trout.

There are also several other ponds that are not operated by the state. These ponds are either city ponds or private ponds. All of the ponds are fishable, some requiring a license.

- Silver Lake, Dover
- Noxontown Pond, Middletown
- Lake Como, Smyrna
- Wyoming Mill Pond, Wyoming/Camden
