= 16th Delaware General Assembly =

American legislative session

←	15th	17th	→

Overview
- Legislative body: Delaware General Assembly
- Term: October 20, 1791 – January 1, 1793

The 16th Delaware General Assembly was a meeting of the legislative branch of the state government, consisting of the Delaware Legislative Council and the Delaware House of Assembly. Elections were held the first day of October and terms began on the twentieth day of October. It met in Dover, Delaware, convening October 20, 1791, and was the last year of the administration of President Joshua Clayton.

The apportionment of seats was permanently assigned to three councilors and seven assemblymen for each of the three counties. Population of the county did not effect the number of delegates.

== Leadership ==
=== Legislative Council ===
- George Mitchell, Sussex County

=== House of Assembly ===
- Allan McLane, Kent County

== Members ==
=== Legislative Council ===
Councilors were elected by the public for a three-year term, one third posted each year.

New Castle County

- Archibald Alexander
- Thomas Kean
- Nehemiah Tilton

Kent County

- Fenwick Fisher
- John Gordon
- James Raymond

Sussex County

- Isaac Cooper
- George Mitchell
- Rhodes Shankland

=== House of Assembly ===
Assemblymen were elected by the public for a one-year term.

New Castle County

- John Collins
- Thomas Evans
- Samuel Hollingsworth
- Solomon Maxwell
- William McKennan
- Alexander Reynolds
- William Robeson

Kent County

- Joseph Barker
- Andrew Barratt
- Stephen Lewis
- Frances Many
- Allan McLane
- Joseph Oliver
- George Truitt

Sussex County

- John W. Batson
- Jeremiah Cannon
- Wingate Cannon
- John Collins
- Isaac Draper
- Nathaniel Hayes
- Daniel Rogers

== Places with more information ==
- Delaware Historical Society; website; 505 North Market Street, Wilmington, Delaware 19801; (302) 655-7161.
- University of Delaware; Library website; 181 South College Avenue, Newark, Delaware 19717; (302) 831-2965.
