= Henry Neill =

Rugby union player from Northern Ireland

- Full name: Henry James Neill
- Born: 12 December 1860 Geelong, Australia
- Died: 27 June 1949 (aged 88) Mayfield, County Down, Northern Ireland

Rugby union career
- Position: Forward
International career
Years	Team	Apps	(Points)
1885–88	Ireland	9	(0)

Henry James Neill (12 December 1860 – 27 June 1949) was an Irish international rugby union player.

One of 10 siblings, Neill was born in Geelong, Australia, not far from Melbourne. His father was a Belfast native, but his mother a local. When Neill was still a toddler, the family moved to Craigavad, County Down.

Neill, a forward, was capped eight times for Ireland during the 1880s. He featured in the team which defeated England for the first time in 1887 and the following season captained Ireland for their Home Nations campaign.

== See also ==
- List of Ireland national rugby union players
