= 57th Delaware General Assembly =

Legislative session in Delaware, USA (1833–1835)

←	56th	58th	→

Overview
- Legislative body: Delaware General Assembly
- Term: January 1, 1833 – January 6, 1835

The 57th Delaware General Assembly (1833–1835) was a meeting of the legislative branch of the state government, consisting of the Delaware Senate and the Delaware House of Representatives. Elections were held the first Tuesday of after November 1 and terms began on the first Tuesday in January. It met in Dover, convening January 1, 1833, two weeks before the beginning of the first and second year of the administration of Governor Caleb P. Bennett.

The apportionment of seats was permanently assigned to three senators and seven representatives for each of the three counties. Population of the county did not effect the number of delegates. Both chambers had a Whig majority.

== Leadership ==
=== Senate ===
- Joshua Burton, Sussex County

=== House of Representatives ===
- John Raymond, Kent County

== Members ==
=== Senate ===
Senators were elected by the public for a four-year term, some elected each two year.

New Castle County

- Richard H. Bayard
- James Booth
- John Sutton

Kent County

- James P. Lofland
- Joseph Smithers
- Thomas Wainwright

Sussex County

- Joshua Burton
- Henry F. Rodney
- William D. Waples

=== House of Representatives ===
Representatives were elected by the public for a term, every two years.

New Castle County

- Christopher Brooks
- John Caulk
- John D. Dilworth
- William Herdman
- George Springer
- Dickinson Webster
- Harry Williamson

Kent County

- Peter F. Causey
- Ignatius T. Cooper
- Isaac Gruwell
- Manlove Johnson
- Charles Marin
- John Raymond
- Thomas A. Rees

Sussex County

- Nicholas W. Adams
- Thomas Davis
- John H. Harris
- William Harris
- George Hearn
- Thomas Jacobs
- Joshua Johnson Sr.

== Places with more information ==
- Delaware Historical Society; website; 505 North Market Street, Wilmington, Delaware 19801; (302) 655-7161.
- University of Delaware; Library website; 181 South College Avenue, Newark, Delaware 19717; (302) 831-2965.
