= 46th Delaware General Assembly =

American legislative session

| ← | 45th | 47th | → |

Overview
- Legislative body: Delaware General Assembly
- Term: January 1, 1822 – January 7, 1823

The 46th Delaware General Assembly was a meeting of the legislative branch of the state government, consisting of the Delaware Senate and the Delaware House of Representatives. Elections were held the first Tuesday of October and terms began on the first Tuesday in January. It met in Dover, convening January 1, 1822, two weeks before the beginning of the year of the administration of Governor John Collins. He died April 16, 1822, and Governor Caleb Rodney took administration.

The apportionment of seats was permanently assigned to three senators and seven representatives for each of the three counties. Population of the county did not effect the number of delegates. Both chambers had a Federalist majority.

== Leadership ==
=== Senate ===
- Caleb Rodney, Sussex County

=== House of Representatives ===
- Alrichs Ryland, New Castle County

== Members ==
=== Senate ===
Senators were elected by the public for a three-year term, one third posted each year.

New Castle County

- Victor du Pont
- Charles Thomas Jr.
- Jacob Vandegrift

Kent County

- Thomas Clayton
- George Cummins
- Maylove Hayes

Sussex County

- Jesse Green
- Joseph Maull
- Caleb Rodney

=== House of Representatives ===
Representatives were elected by the public for a one-year term.

New Castle County

- Jesse Chandler
- John Harlan
- Washington Rice
- Alrichs Ryland
- William Seal
- John Sutton
- William Weldon II

Kent County

- William Hopkins
- James B. Macomb
- Samuel Mifflin
- Henry M. Ridgely
- Robert Register
- George Walker
- Samuel Warren Jr.

Sussex County

- Joshua Burton
- Charles M. Cullen
- George Howard
- Peter Robinson
- David Smith
- Thomas Townsend
- John Wilson

== Places with more information ==
- Delaware Historical Society; website; 505 North Market Street, Wilmington, Delaware 19801; (302) 655-7161.
- University of Delaware; Library website; 181 South College Avenue, Newark, Delaware 19717; (302) 831-2965.
