= 49th Delaware General Assembly =

American legislative session

←	48th	50th	→

Overview
- Legislative body: Delaware General Assembly
- Term: January 4, 1825 – January 3, 1826

The 49th Delaware General Assembly was a meeting of the legislative branch of the state government, consisting of the Delaware Senate and the Delaware House of Representatives. Elections were held the first Tuesday of October and terms began on the first Tuesday in January. It met in Dover, Delaware, convening January 4, 1825, two weeks before the beginning of the second year of the administration of Governor Samuel Paynter.

The apportionment of seats was permanently assigned to three senators and seven representatives for each of the three counties. Population of the county did not effect the number of delegates. Both chambers had a Federalist majority.

== Leadership ==
=== Senate ===
- Jesse Green, Sussex County

=== House of Representatives ===
- Joshua Burton, Sussex County

== Members ==
=== Senate ===
Senators were elected by the public for a three-year term, one third posted each year.

New Castle County

- John Erwin
- William Weldon II
- Henry Whiteley

Kent County

- George Cummins
- William W. Morris
- Charles Polk Jr.,

Sussex County

- Charles M. Cullen
- Jesse Green
- William N. Polk

=== House of Representatives ===
Representatives were elected by the public for a one-year term.

New Castle County

- Samuel H. Black
- Josiah F. Clement
- John Crow
- Joseph England
- John Exton
- David Penny
- Christopher Vandegrift

Kent County

- John Booth
- Samuel Coombe
- William Johnson
- James Kimmey
- Samuel Mifflin
- John Raymond
- Spencer Williams

Sussex County

- Joshua Burton
- Spencer Phillips
- John Robinson
- Peter Robinson
- Whiting Sanford
- Purnal Tindall
- Spencer Williams

== Places with more information ==
- Delaware Historical Society; website; 505 North Market Street, Wilmington, Delaware 19801; (302) 655-7161.
- University of Delaware; Library website; 181 South College Avenue, Newark, Delaware 19717; (302) 831-2965.
