= 53rd Delaware General Assembly =

American legislative session

←	52nd	54th	→

Overview
- Legislative body: Delaware General Assembly
- Term: January 6, 1829 – January 5, 1830

The 53rd Delaware General Assembly (1829–1830) was a meeting of the legislative branch of the state government, consisting of the Delaware Senate and the Delaware House of Representatives. Elections were held the first Tuesday of October and terms began on the first Tuesday in January. It met in Dover, Delaware, convening January 6, 1829, two weeks before the beginning of the third year of the administration of Governor Charles Polk Jr.

The apportionment of seats was permanently assigned to three senators and seven representatives for each of the three counties. Population of the county did not effect the number of delegates. Both chambers had a Federalist majority.

== Leadership ==
=== Senate ===
- Presley Spruance Jr., Kent County

=== House of Representatives ===
- William W. Morris, Kent County
- John Raymond, Kent County

== Members ==
=== Senate ===
Senators were elected by the public for a three-year term, one third posted each year.

New Castle County

- Levi Boulden
- Thomas Deakyne
- John Harlan

Kent County

- Elias Naudain Jr.
- Joseph G. Oliver
- Presley Spruance Jr.

Sussex County

- Joseph Maull
- Peter Robinson
- Purnal Tindall

=== House of Representatives ===
Representatives were elected by the public for a one-year term.

New Castle County

- Benjamin Chandler
- Charles H. Haughey
- Samuel Murphy
- William T. Read
- John Sutton
- Harman Talley
- Benjamin Whitely

Kent County

- John Booth
- Peter L. Cooper Sr.
- Mathias Day
- James P. Lofland
- William W. Morris
- John Raymond
- Samuel Virden

Sussex County

- Thomas Davis
- William Dunning
- Caleb S. Layton
- Kendall M. Lewis
- John Tennent
- George Truitt
- John White

== Places with more information ==
- Delaware Historical Society; website; 505 North Market Street, Wilmington, Delaware 19801; (302) 655-7161.
- University of Delaware; Library website; 181 South College Avenue, Newark, Delaware 19717; (302) 831-2965.
