= 45th Delaware General Assembly =

American legislative session

| ← | 44th | 46th | → |

Overview
- Legislative body: Delaware General Assembly
- Term: January 2, 1821 – January 1, 1822

The 45th Delaware General Assembly was a meeting of the legislative branch of the state government, consisting of the Delaware Senate and the Delaware House of Representatives. Elections were held the first Tuesday of October and terms began on the first Tuesday in January. It met in Dover, convening January 2, 1821, two weeks before the beginning of the year of the administration of Governor John Clark.

The apportionment of seats was permanently assigned to three senators and seven representatives for each of the three counties. Population of the county did not effect the number of delegates. Both chambers had a Federalist majority.

== Leadership ==
=== Senate ===
- Caleb Rodney, Sussex County

=== House of Representatives ===
- John Cummins, Kent County

== Members ==
=== Senate ===
Senators were elected by the public for a three-year term, one third posted each year.

New Castle County

- Samuel H. Black
- Victor du Pont
- Jacob Vandegrift

Kent County

- George Cummins
- Enoch Joyce
  - Thomas Clayton
- Jacob Stout

Sussex County

- Edward Dingle Jr.
- Joseph Maull
- Caleb Rodney

=== House of Representatives ===
Representatives were elected by the public for a one-year term.

New Castle County

- William P. Brobson
- Levi Clark
- Alexander Crawford
- John Crow
- Andrew Gray
- Benjamin H. Springer
- Henry G. Whitely

Kent County

- Joshua G. Brinckle
- Thomas Condy
- John Cummins
- Benjamin Harrington
- Samuel Mifflin
- Joseph G. Oliver
- Major Townsend

Sussex County

- Isaiah Burton
- Isaac Cullen
- John Dickerson
- Tilghman Layton
- George Phillips
- John Robinson
- John Wilson

== Places with more information ==
- Delaware Historical Society; website; 505 North Market Street, Wilmington, Delaware 19801; (302) 655-7161.
- University of Delaware; Library website; 181 South College Avenue, Newark, Delaware 19717; (302) 831-2965.
