= 54th Delaware General Assembly =

American legislative session

←	53rd	55th	→

Overview
- Legislative body: Delaware General Assembly
- Term: January 5, 1830 – January 4, 1831

The 54th Delaware General Assembly (1830–1831) was a meeting of the legislative branch of the state government, consisting of the Delaware Senate and the Delaware House of Representatives. Elections were held on the first Tuesday of October, and terms began on the first Tuesday in January. It met in Dover, convening on January 5, 1830, two weeks before the beginning of the first year of Governor David Hazzard's administration.

Seats were permanently assigned to three senators and seven representatives for each of the three counties. The county's population did not affect the number of delegates. Both chambers had a National Republican majority.

== Leadership ==
=== Senate ===
- Presley Spruance Jr., Kent County

=== House of Representatives ===
- Joshua Burton, Sussex County

== Members ==
=== Senate ===
The public elected senators for a three-year term, one-third posted each year.

New Castle County

- John Caulk
- Thomas Deakyne
- William T. Read

Kent County

- William Johnson
- James P. Lofland
- Presley Spruance Jr.

Sussex County

- Purnal Tindall
- George Truitt
- unknown

=== House of Representatives ===
The public elected representatives for a one-year term.

New Castle County

- Benjamin Chandler
- Charles H. Haughey
- Samuel Murphy
- William T. Read
- John Sutton
- Harman Talley
- Benjamin Whitely
  - Thomas W. Handy

Kent County

- Joel F. Clements
- Cornelius P. Comegys
- Charles Marim
- Benjamin Potter
- William Roe
- Thomas W. Simpson
  - Isaac Harrington
- Simon Spearman

Sussex County

- Joshua Burton
- Isaac W. Copes
- Thomas Davis
- Caleb S. Layton
- Kendall M. Lewis
- Henry F. Rodney
- John Tennent

== Places with more information ==
- Delaware Historical Society; website; 505 North Market Street, Wilmington, Delaware 19801; (302) 655-7161.
- University of Delaware; Library website; 181 South College Avenue, Newark, Delaware 19717; (302) 831-2965.
