= 56th Delaware General Assembly =

Legislative session in Delaware, US (1832–1833)

←	55th	57th	→

Overview
- Legislative body: Delaware General Assembly
- Term: January 3, 1832 – January 1, 1833

The 56th Delaware General Assembly (1832–1833) was a meeting of the legislative branch of the state government, consisting of the Delaware Senate and the Delaware House of Representatives. Elections were held the first Tuesday of October and terms began on the first Tuesday in January. It met in Dover, convening January 3, 1832, two weeks before the beginning of the third year of the administration of Governor David Hazzard.

The apportionment of seats was permanently assigned to three senators and seven representatives for each of the three counties. Population of the county did not affect the number of delegates. Both chambers had a National Republican majority.

== Leadership ==
=== Senate ===
- James P. Lofland, Kent County

=== House of Representatives ===
- Thomas Davis, Sussex County

== Members ==
=== Senate ===
Senators were elected by the public for a three-year term, one third posted each year.

New Castle County

- Jacob Alrichs
- James Booth
- John Sutton

Kent County

- William Johnson
- James P. Lofland
- Thomas Wainwright

Sussex County

- Joshua Burton
- John Carey
- Kendall M. Lewis

=== House of Representatives ===
Representatives were elected by the public for a one-year term.

New Castle County

- John Caulk
- John D. Dilworth
- James Gardner
- Thomas W. Handy
  - Christopher Brooks
- John Harlan
- Dickinson Webster
- Harry Williamson

Kent County

- John Booth
- Peter F. Causey
- Isaac Gruwell
- William Huffington
- Charles Marim
- Thomas A. Rees
- Ayres Stockley

Sussex County

- James Barrett Sr.
- Jehu Bennett
- Thomas Davis
- George Frame
- John Gibbons
- George Hearn
- Shephard P. Houston

== Places with more information ==
- Delaware Historical Society; website; 505 North Market Street, Wilmington, Delaware 19801; (302) 655-7161.
- University of Delaware; Library website; 181 South College Avenue, Newark, Delaware 19717; (302) 831-2965.
