= 48th Delaware General Assembly =

American legislative session

←	47th	49th	→

Overview
- Legislative body: Delaware General Assembly
- Term: January 6, 1824 – January 4, 1825

The 48th Delaware General Assembly was a meeting of the legislative branch of the state government, consisting of the Delaware Senate and the Delaware House of Representatives. Elections were held the first of Tuesday in October and terms began on the first Tuesday in January. It met in Dover, Delaware, convening January 6, 1824, two weeks before the beginning of the first year of the administration of Governor Samuel Paynter.

The apportionment of seats was permanently assigned to three senators and seven representatives for each of the three counties. Population of the county did not effect the number of delegates. Both chambers had a Federalist majority.

== Leadership ==
=== Senate ===
- Jesse Green, Sussex County

=== House of Representatives ===
- Joshua Burton, Sussex County

== Members ==
=== Senate ===
Senators were elected by the public for a three-year term, one third posted each year.

New Castle County

- John Erwin
- Charles Thomas Jr.
- William Weldon II

Kent County

- Willard Hall
  - John Cummins
- Maylove Hayes
- William W. Morris

Sussex County

- Charles M. Cullen
- Jesse Green
- Samuel Paynter Jr.

=== House of Representatives ===
Representatives were elected by the public for a one-year term.

New Castle County

- Levi Boulden
- Josiah F. Clement
- Richard E. Cochran
- Andrew Gray
- William F. Grubb
- William Vandegrift
- Benjamin Watson

Kent County

- John M. Clayton
- Samuel Coombe
- Luff Lewis
- Samuel Mifflin
- John Pleasanton
- Charles Polk Jr.
- John B. Savin

Sussex County

- Joshua Burton
- George Howard
- Spencer Phillips
- William N. Polk
- John Robinson
- Peter Robinson
- Purnal Tindall

== Places with more information ==
- Delaware Historical Society; website; 505 North Market Street, Wilmington, Delaware 19801; (302) 655-7161.
- University of Delaware; Library website; 181 South College Avenue, Newark, Delaware 19717; (302) 831-2965.
