= 51st Delaware General Assembly =

←	50th	52nd	→

Overview
- Legislative body: Delaware General Assembly
- Term: January 2, 1827 – January 1, 1828

The 51st Delaware General Assembly (1827–1828) was a meeting of the legislative branch of the state government, consisting of the Delaware Senate and the Delaware House of Representatives. Elections were held the first Tuesday of October and terms began on the first Tuesday in January. It met in Dover, Delaware, convening January 2, 1827, two weeks before the beginning of the first year of the administration of Governor Charles Polk Jr.

The apportionment of seats was permanently assigned to three senators and seven representatives for each of the three counties. Population of the county did not effect the number of delegates. Both chambers had a Federalist majority.

== Leadership ==
=== Senate ===
- Henry Whiteley, New Castle County

=== House of Representatives ===
- Archibald Hamilton, New Castle County

== Members ==
=== Senate ===
Senators were elected by the public for a three-year term, one third posted each year.

New Castle County

- Joseph England
- Christopher Vandegrift
- Henry Whiteley

Kent County

- John Brinckle
- Charles Polk Jr.
- Presley Spruance Jr.

Sussex County

- Jesse Green
- William N. Polk
- Peter Robinson

=== House of Representatives ===
Representatives were elected by the public for a one-year term.

New Castle County

- Samuel H. Black
- Josiah F. Clement
- Daniel Corbit
- Alexander Crawford
- John Erwin
- Archibald Hamilton
- John Higgins

Kent County

- Martin W. Bates
- Jehu Clark
- Jacob Raymond
- Henry M. Ridgely
- Robert Register
- Thomas M. Stout
- Ignatius Taylor

Sussex County

- Francis Brown
- Joshua Burton
- George Phillips
- Lawrence Riley
- John Tennent
- Miles Tindall
- John Wiltbank

== Places with more information ==
- Delaware Historical Society; website; 505 North Market Street, Wilmington, Delaware 19801; (302) 655-7161.
- University of Delaware; Library website; 181 South College Avenue, Newark, Delaware 19717; (302) 831-2965.
