= 55th Delaware General Assembly =

Legislative session in Delaware, US (1831–1832)

←	54th	56th	→

Overview
- Legislative body: Delaware General Assembly
- Term: January 4, 1831 – January 3, 1832

The 55th Delaware General Assembly (1831–1832) was a meeting of the legislative branch of the state government, consisting of the Delaware Senate and the Delaware House of Representatives. Elections were held the first Tuesday of October and terms began on the first Tuesday in January. It met in Dover, convening January 4, 1831, two weeks before the beginning of the second year of the administration of Governor David Hazzard.

The apportionment of seats was permanently assigned to three senators and seven representatives for each of the three counties. Population of the county did not affect the number of delegates. Both chambers had a National Republican majority.

== Leadership ==
=== Senate ===
- Presley Spruance Jr., Kent County

=== House of Representatives ===
- Joshua Burton, Sussex County

== Members ==
=== Senate ===
Senators were elected by the public for a three-year term, one third posted each year.

New Castle County

- Jacob Alrichs
- John Caulk
- William T. Read

Kent County

- William Johnson
- James P. Lofland
- Presley Spruance Jr.

Sussex County

- Caleb S. Layton
  - John Carey
- John Tennett
- George Truitt

=== House of Representatives ===
Representatives were elected by the public for a one-year term.

New Castle County

- John Caulk
- Charles H. Haughey
- William Kennedy
- William McCaulley
- John Sutton
- Benjamin Whitely
- Harry Williamson

Kent County

- John Booth
- William Huffington
- Nunn Jenkins
- Charles Marim
- John Raymond
- Thomas A. Rees
- Simuel Virden

Sussex County

- Nicholas W. Adams
- Joshua Burton
- Thomas Davis
- George Frame
- George Hearn
- Kendall M. Lewis
- Henry F. Rodney

== Places with more information ==
- Delaware Historical Society; website; 505 North Market Street, Wilmington, Delaware 19801; (302) 655-7161.
- University of Delaware; Library website; 181 South College Avenue, Newark, Delaware 19717; (302) 831-2965.
