= Edward Roche (politician) =

American politician

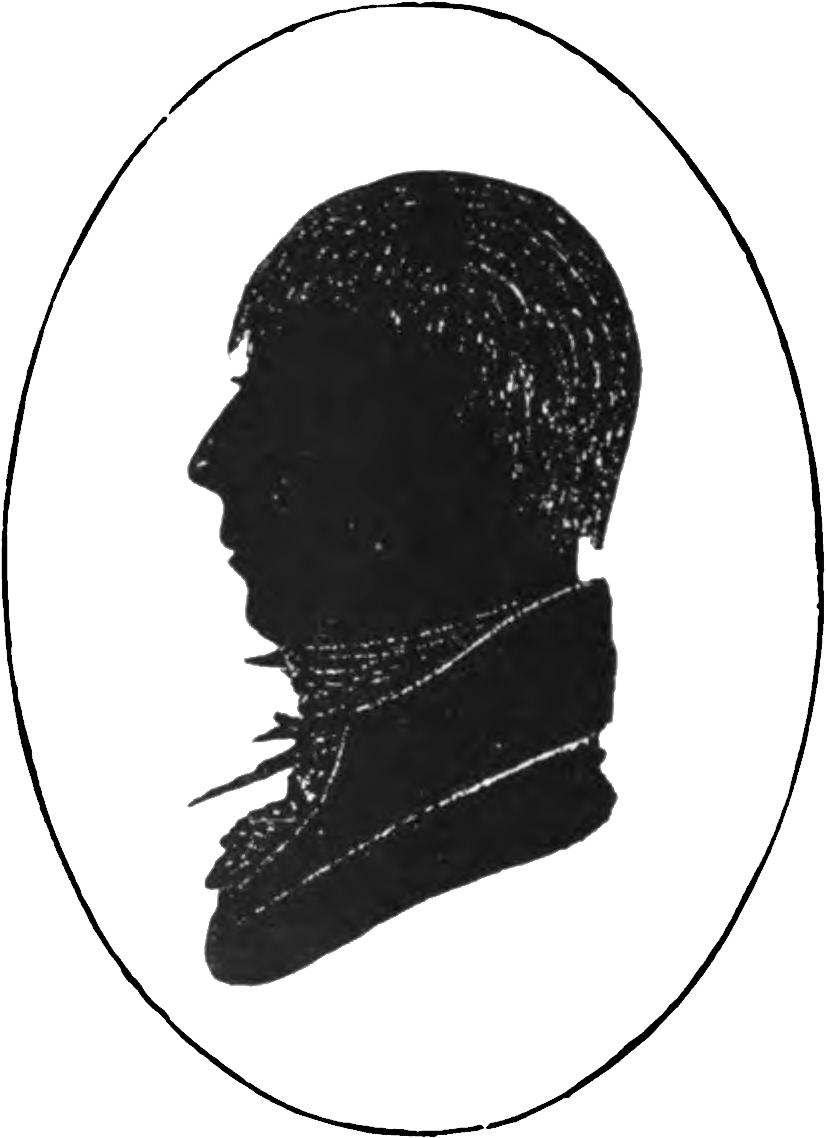
A silhouette of Edward Roche published in an 1895 book based on a reproduction from the original in the possession of his granddaughter at the time.

Edward Roche (April 10, 1754 – April 6, 1821) was an American merchant who served in both houses of the Delaware General Assembly, as a delegate to the Delaware state constitutional convention, and in the American Revolutionary War.

== Biography ==
Roche was born in County Cork, Ireland, on April 10, 1754, to Lawrence Roche and Mary Manning. He left Ireland at age 14 and arrived in Philadelphia, Pennsylvania, where he reportedly became an apprentice with a local merchant. On April 1, 1782, he married Eliza Brinckle in Red Lion Hundred, Delaware; the couple would go on to have nine children.

Following his apprenticeship, Roche launched his own business in New Castle, Delaware, at the age of 21. Shortly afterwards, the Revolutionary War broke out. Roche, inspired by the writings of the Founding Fathers and other early Americans calling for independence, joined the local militia. Records show that he became the Paymaster of the Delaware Regiment on April 5, 1777, under Colonel David Hall. His regiment joined General George Washington and the Continental Army in New Jersey shortly afterwards. The Delaware men were reported to have fought at the battles of Brandywine, Germantown, and Monmouth, as well as served during the encampment at Valley Forge. However, Roche makes no mention of these battles or encampment in his pension application, nor does he appear on the digitized muster roll from Valley Forge. On September 10, 1778, he was recommissioned as Paymaster and Lieutenant in the Delaware Regiment.

Roche remained in his roles with the regiment as they began their march to join the Southern Campaign on April 16, 1780. During the Battle of Camden on August 16, 1780, he became one of 47 prisoners of war from his regiment taken by the British forces. Several accounts reported: "In this battle the regiment of Delaware was nearly annihilated." Roche was held until paroled at the end of the war. It was said in an obituary that his experience "was on that account, treated with so much severity as to impair his constitution for the rest of his life."

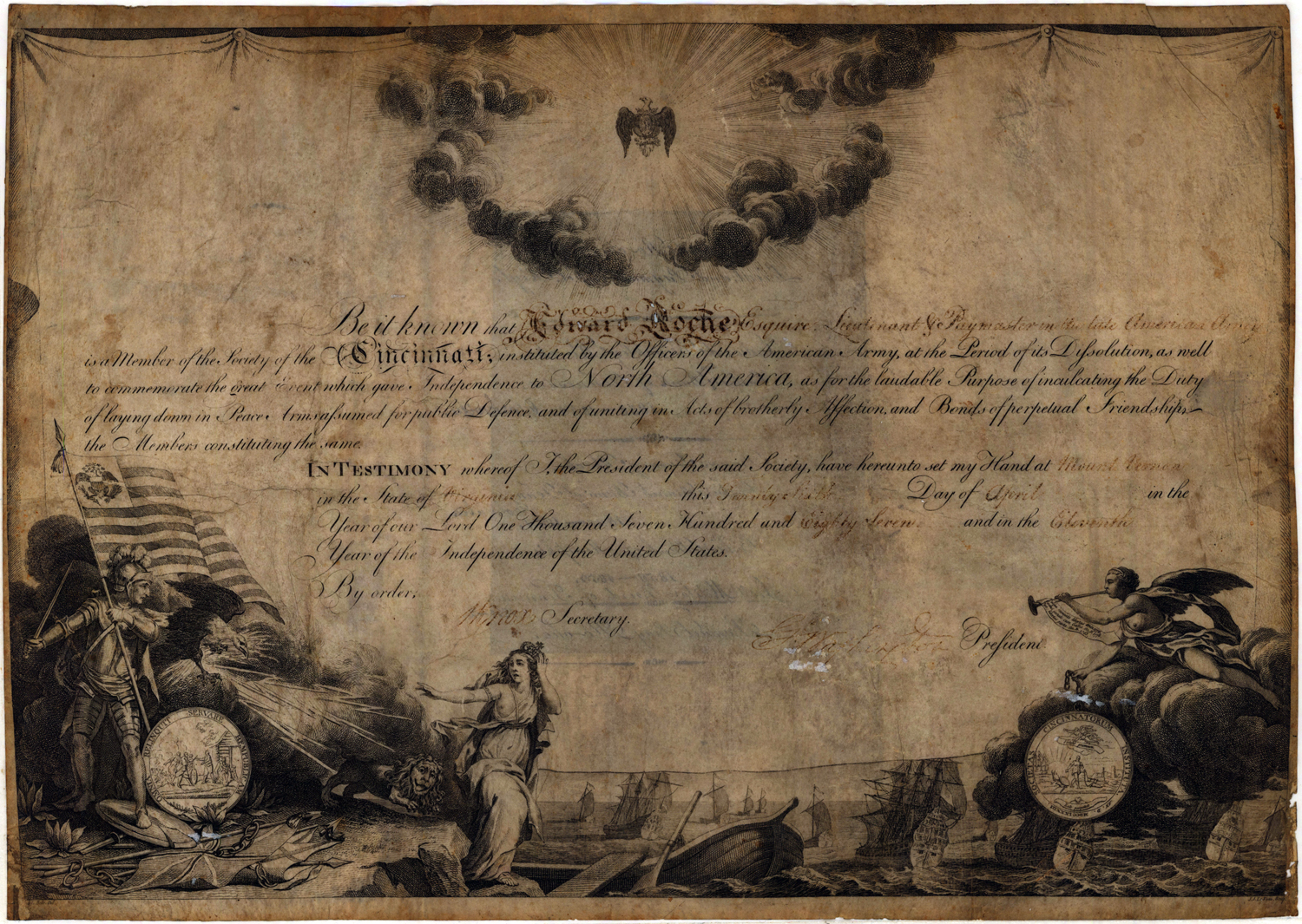
Edward Roche's membership certificate issued in 1787 for the Society of the Cincinnati signed by George Washington

Upon his return to Delaware after the War, Roche started over in business, met and married his wife, and started a family. On July 4, 1783, he met with Continental Army Surgeon James Tilton, Maj. James Patten, Capt. William McKennan, and Lt. Stephen McWilliam in Wilmington to establish the Delaware State Society of the Cincinnati. He was elected as the group's first Treasurer and would also serve as Secretary. In February 1800, Roche was selected by the society to deliver an oration on the death of George Washington at Second Presbyterian Church in Wilmington. The society continued to meet on July 4 in Wilmington until it formally disbanded in 1802. His membership certificate signed by George Washington is currently in the collection of the Tennessee Historical Society, a donation likely made by his descendants who relocated to Nashville in the 1800s.

In 1791, Roche was appointed as a delegate to Delaware's Constitutional Convention. He was then elected to serve in the first legislative session under the new state constitution in 1792 as a member of the state House of Representatives after a failed bid for the United States Congress. In 1798, Roche was elected to the State Senate. He is also credited with helping to organize the water department for Wilmington.

Following his short state political career, Roche was appointed as a Notary on April 18, 1800, a position he held for approximately 20 years. Around this time, he was also commissioned as a Justice of Peace, another position he held for many years until around the time of his death. During this period, he served as First Lieutenant of the Veterans Corps of Delaware before it was disbanded in 1802. However, the idea was revisited upon new threats from Great Britain in the War of 1812. During that time, Roche served as Second Lieutenant in the Veteran Home-Guard for defense of Wilmington, Delaware. On May 20, 1815, he was appointed by Governor Daniel Rodney as Escheator of New Castle County.

In 1818, Eliza Roche died, and Edward went to live with two of his adult daughters who would help him raise the daughters of his deceased son. Roche applied for his pension for time served as an officer in the Revolutionary War at this time, and he was awarded $20 per month. However, on July 10, 1820, Roche received word that his pension was revoked. He appealed the decision based on small overall value of items owned and lack of assurance in future income from appointments as a Notary and Justice of the Peace. The pension was not renewed.

On April 6, 1821, Edward Roche died. He was buried in the Old Swedes Churchyard at Wilmington.
