= Caesar Augustus Rodney =

American politician (1772–1824)

Caesar A. Rodney
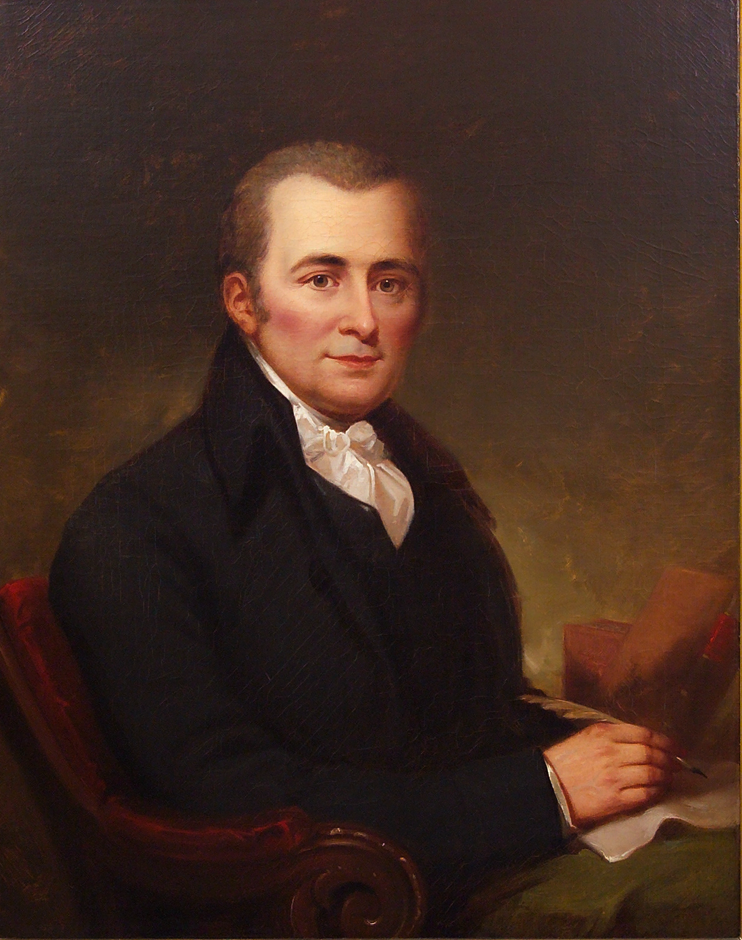
- Posthumous portrait, c. 1870

1st United States Minister to Argentina
- In office December 27, 1823 – June 10, 1824
- President: James Monroe
- Preceded by: Position established
- Succeeded by: James A. Peden

United States Senator from Delaware
- In office January 24, 1822 – January 29, 1823
- Preceded by: Outerbridge Horsey
- Succeeded by: Thomas Clayton

Member of the U.S. House of Representatives from Delaware's at-large district
- In office March 4, 1821 – January 24, 1822; 2nd seat
- Preceded by: Willard Hall
- Succeeded by: Daniel Rodney
- In office March 4, 1803 – March 3, 1805 sole seat
- Preceded by: James A. Bayard
- Succeeded by: James M. Broom

6th United States Attorney General
- In office January 20, 1807 – December 5, 1811
- President: Thomas Jefferson; James Madison
- Preceded by: John Breckinridge
- Succeeded by: William Pinkney

Member of the Delaware House of Representatives
- In office 1796–1802

Personal details
- Born: January 4, 1772 Dover, Delaware Colony, British America
- Died: June 10, 1824 (aged 52) Buenos Aires, United Provinces of the Río de la Plata
- Party: Democratic-Republican
- Spouse: Susan Hunn
- Education: University of Pennsylvania (BA)

Caesar Augustus Rodney (January 4, 1772 – June 10, 1824) was an American lawyer and politician from Wilmington, in New Castle County, Delaware. He was a member of the Democratic-Republican Party, who served in the Delaware General Assembly, as well as a U.S. representative from Delaware, U.S. senator from Delaware, U.S. attorney general, and U.S. minister to Argentina.

== Early life and family ==
Rodney was born in Dover in the Delaware Colony, son of Thomas Rodney and Elizabeth Fisher. He was the nephew of Caesar Rodney, the signer of the Declaration of Independence who is depicted on the Delaware state quarter. After graduating from the University of Pennsylvania in 1789, he studied law under Joseph B. McKean in Philadelphia and was admitted to the bar in 1793. He practiced law in Wilmington and New Castle, Delaware, for the next three years. Rodney married Susan Hunn, the daughter of Captain John Hunn, and their home was "Cool Springs", located in Wilmington.

== Professional and political career ==
=== State House ===
Rodney served six terms as State Representative, from the 1797 session through the 1802 session. There he became one of the leaders of the Jeffersonian party, now known as the Democratic-Republican Party.

=== US House ===
Encouraged by Jefferson to compete for the U.S. House against the staunch Federalist James A. Bayard, Rodney ran and won a lively campaign by fifteen votes. While in the U.S. House, he was a member of the Committee on Ways and Means, and established a national reputation as one of the impeachment managers appointed in January 1804 to prepare and prosecute the articles of impeachment in the impeachment proceedings against John Pickering, judge of the United States District Court for New Hampshire. Pickering was charged with conduct unbecoming a judge, and his acquittal was viewed as strengthening the independence of the judiciary. In December of the same year, Rodney served as an impeachment manager in another such case against Samuel Chase, Associate Justice of the Supreme Court of the United States.

After serving one term in the U.S. House from March 4, 1803, until March 3, 1805, he was defeated for reelection in 1804 by Bayard

While Rodney spent most of his legal career in public service, he took on at least one notable case as a private advocate during the year before his appointment as Attorney General. In 1806, he made an appearance before the Mayor's Court of Philadelphia to defend the Philadelphia Cordwainers against a common law charge of conspiracy. The conspiracy charge was instituted by retail shoe merchants, based on attempts by the journeyman shoe and boot makers, to organize for the purpose of setting their wages and hours. Rodney was unsuccessful in attaining an acquittal for the workers.

== Attorney general ==
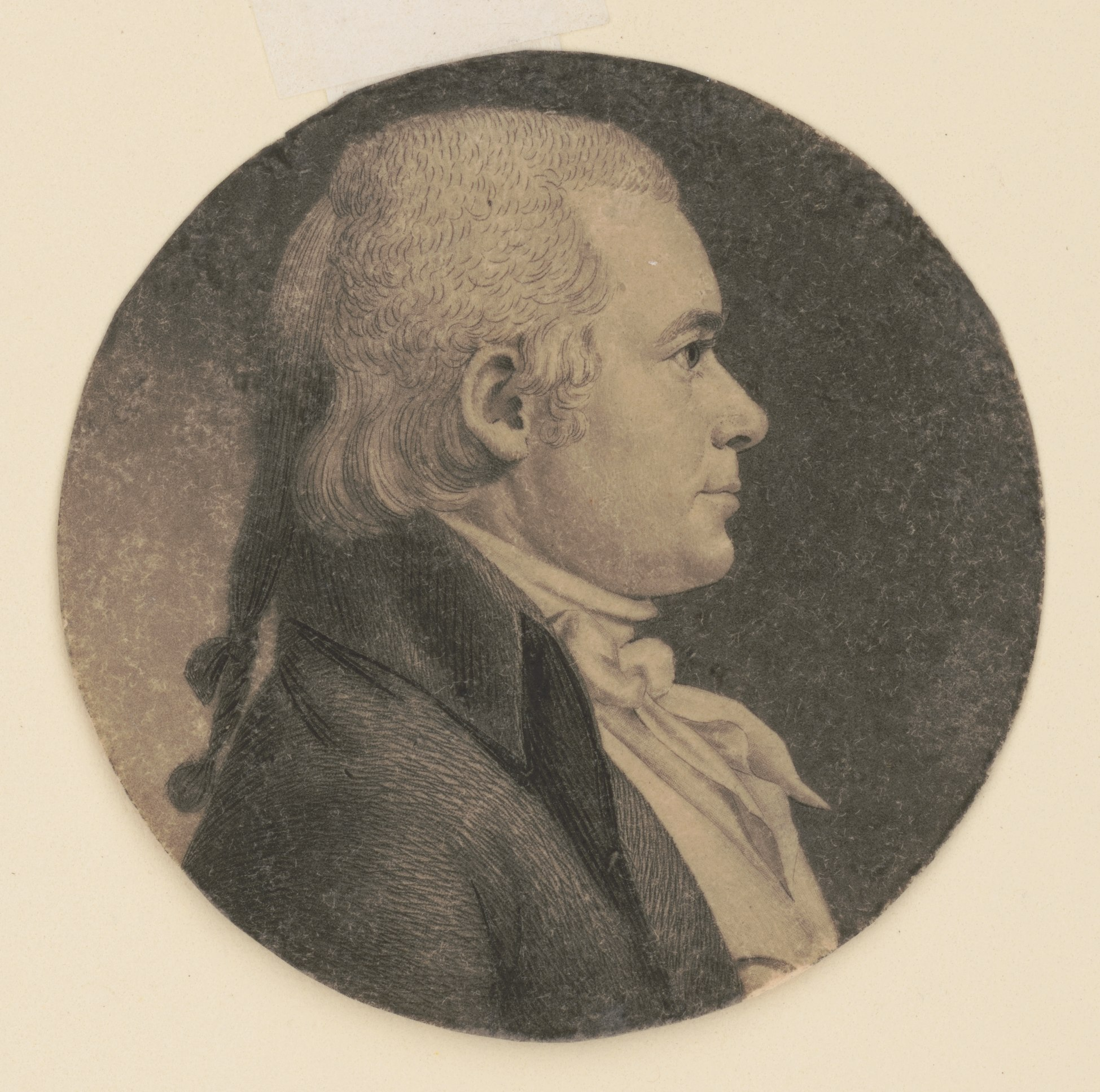
Engraving by Charles Balthazar Julien Févret de Saint-Mémin, c. 1800

On January 20, 1807, U.S. President Thomas Jefferson named Rodney his U.S. Attorney General. He served in that office for the remainder of Jefferson's term and for nearly three years in President James Madison's first term. As Attorney General, Rodney participated as a member of the prosecution during the second treason trial of former Vice President Aaron Burr. His father wrote him from the Mississippi Territory on August 24, 1807, "You are in the Cabinet at an Important Period. Proceed firmly and steadily. Let nothing hurry you into Irregularity, yet Remember that wisdom in great Affairs admits of no dilatory Pleas, she requires Decision." Rodney resigned December 5, 1811, unhappy about being passed over for a U.S. Supreme Court appointment. During the War of 1812, he was captain of a rifle corps which became the Delaware 1st Artillery. They served at Fort Union in Wilmington, on the Canadian frontier, and assisted in the defense of Baltimore in 1814.

== Later political activity ==
Rodney returned to politics, serving in the Delaware State Senate for three sessions from 1815 through 1817. In 1820 he was again elected to the U.S. House, serving from March 4, 1821, until January 24, 1822, when he resigned upon being elected to the U.S. Senate. He served there only a year as well, resigning January 29, 1823, to accept a diplomatic appointment. During that brief year Rodney was Delaware's only Democratic-Republican U.S. Senator ever.

Along with John Graham and Theodorick Bland, Rodney was selected by President James Monroe in 1817 for a special diplomatic mission to South America, the South American Commission of 1817–1818. Rodney was appointed to lead the commission to investigate whether the newly formed South American republics should be recognized. He strongly advocated such recognition and, with Graham, published his findings in 1819 as Reports on the Present State of the United Provinces of South America. This report is thought to have contributed much to the thinking behind the policy that eventually became expressed as the Monroe Doctrine.

=== US Minister to Argentina ===
It also resulted in Rodney's 1823 appointment as United States Minister Plenipotentiary to the United Provinces of the Río de la Plata, now known as Argentina. He remained at this posting until his death.

== Death and legacy ==
Rodney died June 10, 1824, in Buenos Aires, and was buried there in the Victoria district British Cemetery. His remains were moved to a crypt at St. John's Cathedral in Buenos Aires. The crypt is at the peristyle of the entrance of the cathedral.

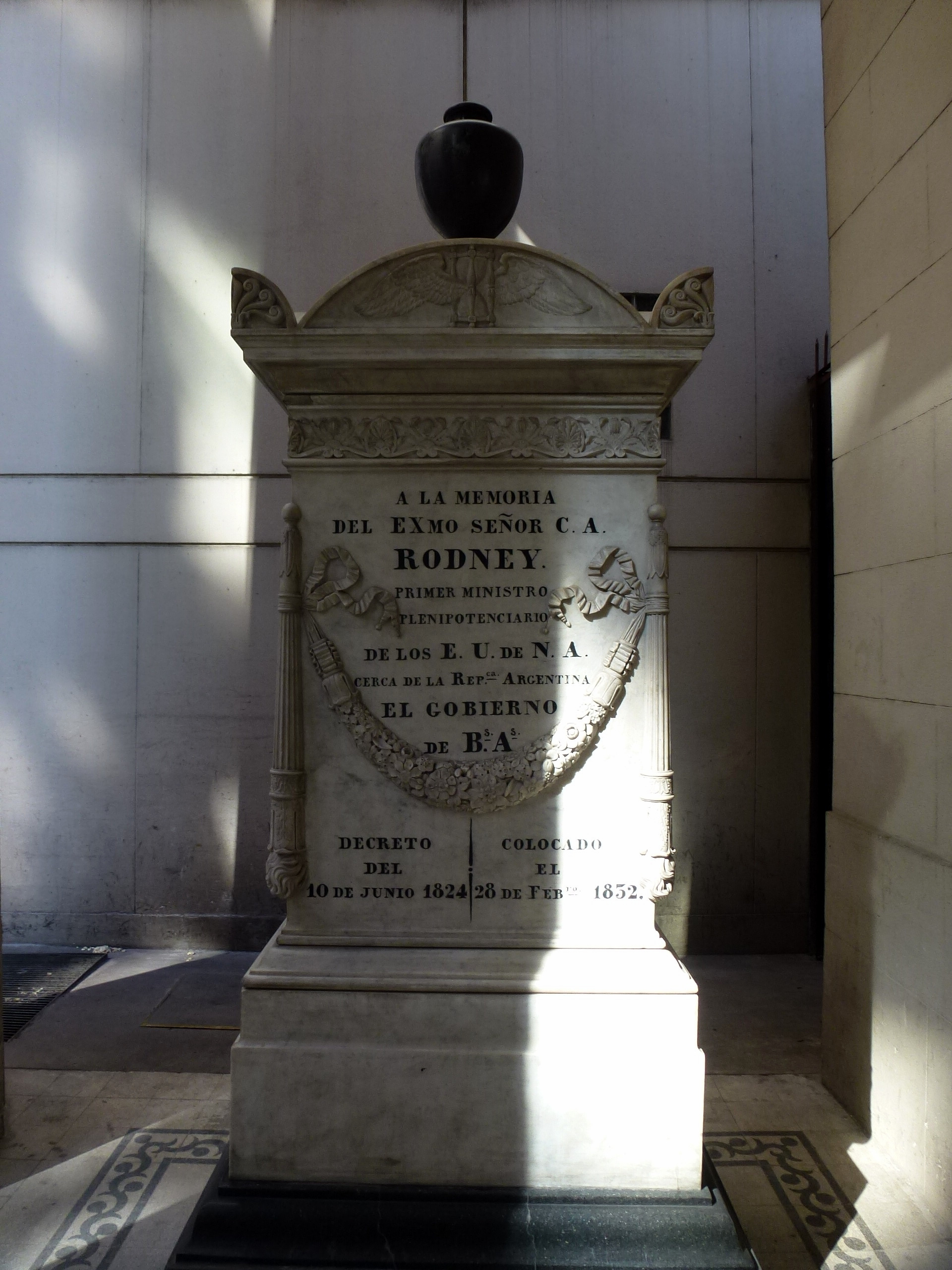
Located at the Anglican Cathedral of St. John the Baptist at Buenos Aires, it reads "In memory of the Most Excellent Mister C. A. Rodney. The first Minister Plenipotentiary of the United States of North America close to the Argentine Republic. The Government of Buenos Aires, Decree of June 10, 1824 – Placed on February 28, 1832."

== Almanac ==
Elections were held the first Tuesday of October. Members of the General Assembly took office on the first Tuesday of January. State Representatives were elected for one year. U.S. Representatives took office March 4 and have a two-year term. The General Assembly chose the U.S. Senators, who also took office March 4, but for a six-year term. In this case the General Assembly failed to fill the position for nearly a year.

Public offices
Office	Type	Location	Began office	Ended office	notes
State Representative	Legislature	Dover	January 3, 1797	January 2, 1798	
State Representative	Legislature	Dover	January 2, 1798	January 1, 1799	
State Representative	Legislature	Dover	January 1, 1799	January 7, 1800	
State Representative	Legislature	Dover	January 7, 1800	January 6, 1801	
State Representative	Legislature	Dover	January 6, 1801	January 5, 1802	
State Representative	Legislature	Dover	January 5, 1802	January 4, 1803	
U.S. Representative	Legislature	Washington, D.C.	March 4, 1803	March 3, 1805	
U.S. Attorney General	Executive	Washington, D.C.	January 20, 1807	December 5, 1811	
State Senate	Legislature	Dover	January 3, 1815	January 6, 1818	
U.S. Representative	Legislature	Washington, D.C.	March 4, 1821	January 22, 1822	
U.S. Senator	Legislature	Washington, D.C.	January 10, 1822	January 29, 1823	
Resident Minister	Executive	Buenos Aires	January 29, 1823	June 10, 1824	Argentina

Delaware General Assembly service
Dates	Assembly	Chamber	Majority	Governor	Committees	District
1797	21st	State House	Federalist	Gunning Bedford Sr.		New Castle at-large
1798	22nd	State House	Federalist	Daniel Rogers		New Castle at-large
1799	23rd	State House	Federalist	Richard Bassett		New Castle at-large
1800	24th	State House	Federalist	Richard Bassett		New Castle at-large
1801	25th	State House	Federalist	James Sykes		New Castle at-large
1802	26th	State House	Federalist	David Hall		New Castle at-large
1815	39th	State Senate	Federalist	Daniel Rodney		New Castle at-large
1816	40th	State Senate	Federalist	Daniel Rodney		New Castle at-large
1817	41st	State Senate	Federalist	John Clark		New Castle at-large

United States congressional service
Dates	Congress	Chamber	Majority	President	Committees	Class/District
1803–1805	8th	U.S. House	Republican	Thomas Jefferson		at-large
1821–1823	17th	U.S. House	Republican	James Monroe		2nd at-large
1821–1823	17th	U.S. Senate	Republican	James Monroe		class 1

Election results
Year	Office	Subject	Party	Votes	%	Opponent	Party	Votes	%
1802	U.S. Representative	Caesar A. Rodney	Republican	3,421	50%	James A. Bayard	Federalist	3,406	50%
1804	U.S. Representative	Caesar A. Rodney	Republican	4,038	48%	James A. Bayard	Federalist	4,398	52%

U.S. House of Representatives
Preceded by N/A	Member of the U.S. House of Representatives from Delaware's at-large congressional district March 4, 1821 – January 24, 1822	Succeeded by N/A
U.S. Senate
Preceded by Outerbridge Horsey	Senator from Delaware; 1822–1823	Succeeded by Thomas Clayton
Diplomatic posts
New title newly independent	U.S. Minister to Argentina; December 27, 1823 – June 10, 1824	Succeeded by John M. Forbes
