= Thomas Cooper (Delaware politician) =

American lawyer and politician (1764–1829)

Member of the U.S. House of Representatives from Delaware's second at-large district
- In office March 4, 1813 – March 3, 1817
- Preceded by: Seat gained in reapportionment
- Succeeded by: Willard Hall

Member of the Delaware Senate
- In office January 6, 1808 – January 6, 1811

Member of the Delaware House of Representatives
- In office January 6, 1803 – January 6, 1808

Personal details
- Born: 1764 Little Creek Hundred, Delaware Colony, British America
- Died: 1829 (aged 64–65) Georgetown, Delaware, U.S.
- Party: Federalist
- Relations: Governor William B. Cooper
- Parent(s): Isaac Cooper and Comfort Townsend Barkley Cooper
- Profession: Lawyer, politician

Thomas Cooper (1764–1829) was a Delaware lawyer and politician who was a Federalist member of the United States House of Representatives. He served in the 13th and 14th congresses.

== Early life and career ==
Cooper was born in Little Creek Hundred in the Delaware Colony, the son of Isaac and Comfort Townsend Barkley Cooper. Cooper's grandfather, Barkley Townsend, came to Laurel in 1768 from Dorchester County, Maryland, and at one time owned nearly the whole area. His father Isaac served in the Delaware General Assembly, and was a member of the Delaware convention that ratified the U.S. Constitution in 1787. Isaac was also a member of the 1792 Delaware Constitutional Convention. Cooper's brother was Governor William B. Cooper.

Cooper completed his preparatory studies at his home in Little Creek Hundred. After studying the law with James P. Wilson, he was admitted to the Delaware Bar in 1805 and began a lifelong practice at Georgetown.

== Political career ==
Cooper was a member of the Federalist Party and began his political career as a member of the State House of Representatives, where he served from 1803 to 1807. He then served a term in the State Senate from 1808 to 1810, until he was elected to the House of Representatives in 1813. Cooper served in the House from March 4, 1813, to March 3, 1817.

== After leaving Congress ==
In 1817 Cooper retired from the U.S. House, but continued the practice of law in Georgetown until his death. Among Cooper's students were Edward Wooten and Caleb S. Layton. Cooper was regarded as a professional and knowledgeable lawyer to his peers.

Cooper died at Georgetown in 1829 and was buried in the Cooper family cemetery near Laurel.

== Almanac ==
Elections were held the first Tuesday of October and members of the General Assembly took office the first Tuesday of January. State Senators had a three-year term and State Representatives terms of one year. U.S. Representatives took office March 4 and have a two-year term.

Public offices
Office	Type	Location	Began office	Ended office	Notes
State House	Legislature	Dover	January 6, 1803	January 6, 1808	
State Senator	Legislature	Dover	January 6, 1808	January 5, 1811	
U.S. Representative	Legislature	Washington	March 4, 1813	March 3, 1817	

Delaware General Assembly service
Dates	Assembly	Chamber	Majority	Governor	Committees	District
1803	28th	State House	Federalist	David Hall		Sussex at-large
1804	29th	State House	Federalist	Nathaniel Mitchell		Sussex at-large
1805	30th	State House	Federalist	Nathaniel Mitchell		Sussex at-large
1806	31st	State House	Federalist	Nathaniel Mitchell		Sussex at-large
1807	32nd	State House	Federalist	George Truitt		Sussex at-large
1808	33rd	State Senate	Federalist	George Truitt		Sussex at-large
1809	34th	State Senate	Federalist	George Truitt		Sussex at-large
1810	35th	State Senate	Federalist	Joseph Haslet		Sussex at-large

United States congressional service
Dates	Congress	Chamber	Majority	President	Committees	Class/District
1813–1815	13th	U.S. House	Republican	James Madison		2nd at-large
1815–1817	14th	U.S. House	Republican	James Madison		2nd at-large

Election results
Year	Office	Subject	Party	votes	%	Opponent	Party	votes	%
1812	U.S. Representative	Thomas Cooper	Federalist	4,183	28%	Richard C. Dale	Republican	3,210	22%
1814	U.S. Representative	Thomas Cooper	Federalist	3,960	30%	Willard Hall	Republican	2,547	20%

U.S. House of Representatives
Preceded by New seat gained in reapportionment	Member of the U.S. House of Representatives from Delaware's at-large congressional district March 4, 1813 – March 3, 1817	Succeeded by Willard Hall
