= Richard Bassett (Delaware politician) =

American Founding Father and politician (1745–1815)

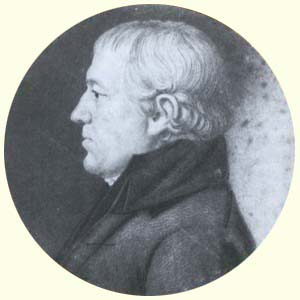

Judge of the United States Circuit Court for the Third Circuit
- In office February 20, 1801 – July 1, 1802
- Appointed by: John Adams
- Preceded by: Seat established by 2 Stat. 89
- Succeeded by: Seat abolished

13th Governor of Delaware
- In office January 9, 1799 – March 3, 1801
- Preceded by: Daniel Rogers
- Succeeded by: James Sykes

Chief Justice of the Delaware Court of Common Pleas
- In office March 4, 1793 – January 15, 1799
- Preceded by: Office established
- Succeeded by: James Booth Sr.

United States Senator from Delaware
- In office March 4, 1789 – March 3, 1793
- Preceded by: Office established
- Succeeded by: John Vining

Personal details
- Born: Richard Bassett; April 2, 1745 Cecil County, Province of Maryland, British America
- Died: September 15, 1815 (aged 70) Cecil County, Maryland, U.S.
- Resting place: Wilmington and Brandywine Cemetery; Wilmington, Delaware
- Party: Federalist
- Relatives: Richard H. Bayard (grandson); James A. Bayard Jr. (grandson)
- Education: read law

Richard Bassett (April 2, 1745 – September 15, 1815) was an American politician, attorney, slave owner and later abolitionist, veteran of the American Revolution, signer of the United States Constitution, and one of the Founding Fathers of America. He also served as United States Senator from Delaware, chief justice of the Delaware Court of Common Pleas, governor of Delaware and a United States circuit judge of the United States Circuit Court for the Third Circuit.

== Education and career ==
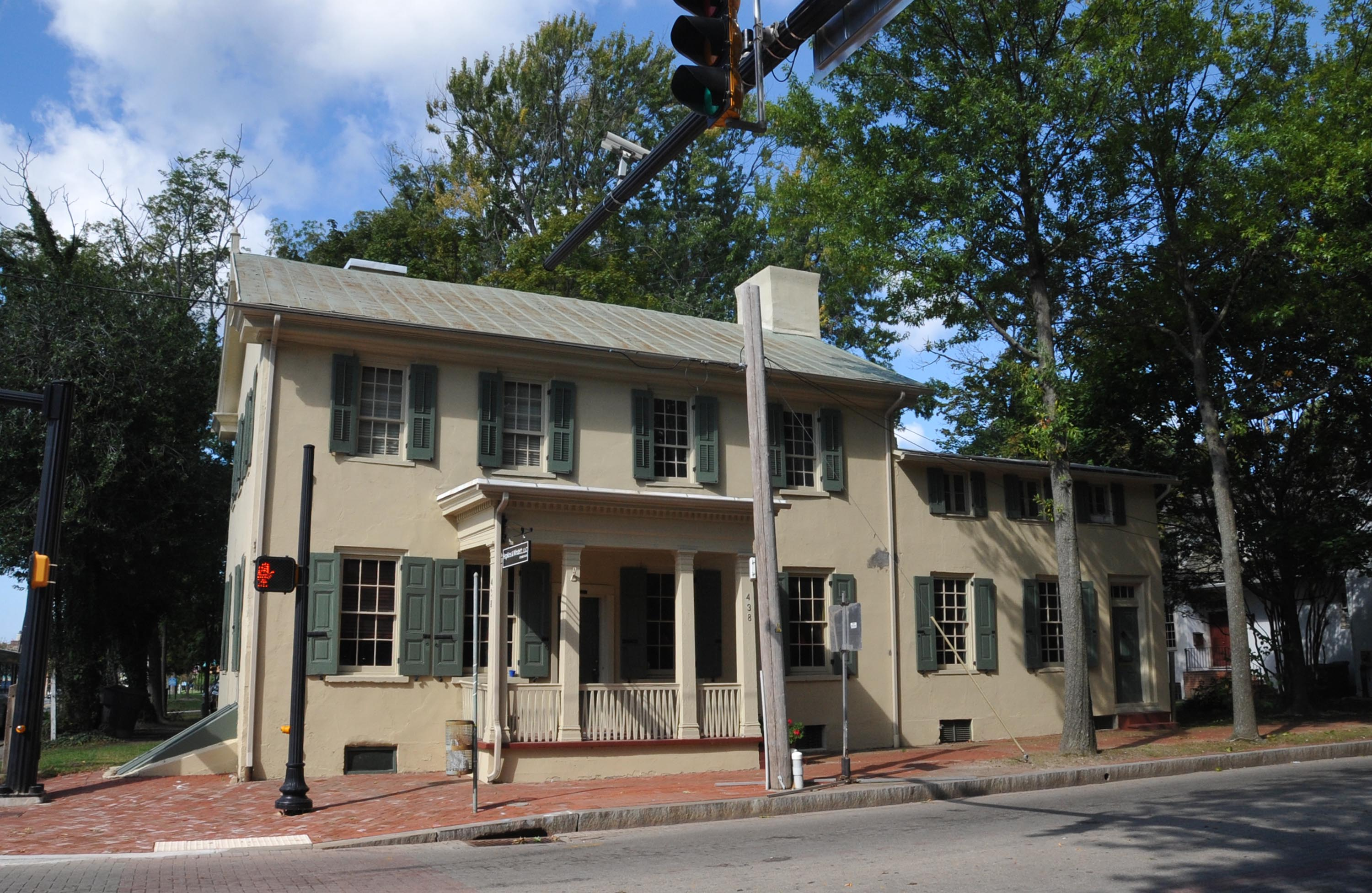
Richard Bassett House in Dover, Delaware

Born on April 2, 1745, in Cecil County, Province of Maryland, British America, Bassett pursued preparatory studies, then read law. He was admitted to the bar and practiced law in Delaware. By concentrating on agricultural pursuits as well as religious and charitable concerns, he quickly established himself amongst the local gentry and "developed a reputation for hospitality and philanthropy." He was a member of the Delaware constitutional conventions of 1776 and 1792. He was a member of the Council of Safety in Dover, Delaware from 1776 to 1786. He served in the Delaware State Militia as a company captain of the Dover Light Horse Regiment from 1777 to 1781. He was a member of the Delaware Legislative Council (now the Delaware Senate) in 1782. He was a member of the Delaware House of Representatives in 1786. He was a delegate to the Constitutional Convention in 1787, and was a signer of the United States Constitution. He was a member of the Delaware convention which ratified the United States Constitution in 1787. He was in private practice in Wilmington, Delaware, from 1787 to 1789.

Bassett was elected to the United States Senate from Delaware and served from March 4, 1789, to March 3, 1793, first as a member of the Anti-Administration Party and later as a member of the Pro-Administration Party. Due to his name coming first alphabetically out of all 20 senators who commenced their first term on 4 March 1789, Bassett is the most senior senator to have served in the United States Senate. Bassett was chief justice of the Delaware Court of Common Pleas from 1793 to 1799. He was governor of Delaware from 1799 to 1801.

Bassett was nominated by President John Adams on February 18, 1801, to the United States Circuit Court for the Third Circuit, to a new seat authorized by 2 Stat. 89. He was confirmed by the United States Senate on February 20, 1801, and received his commission the same day. His service terminated on July 1, 1802, due to abolition of the court.

== Later life and death ==
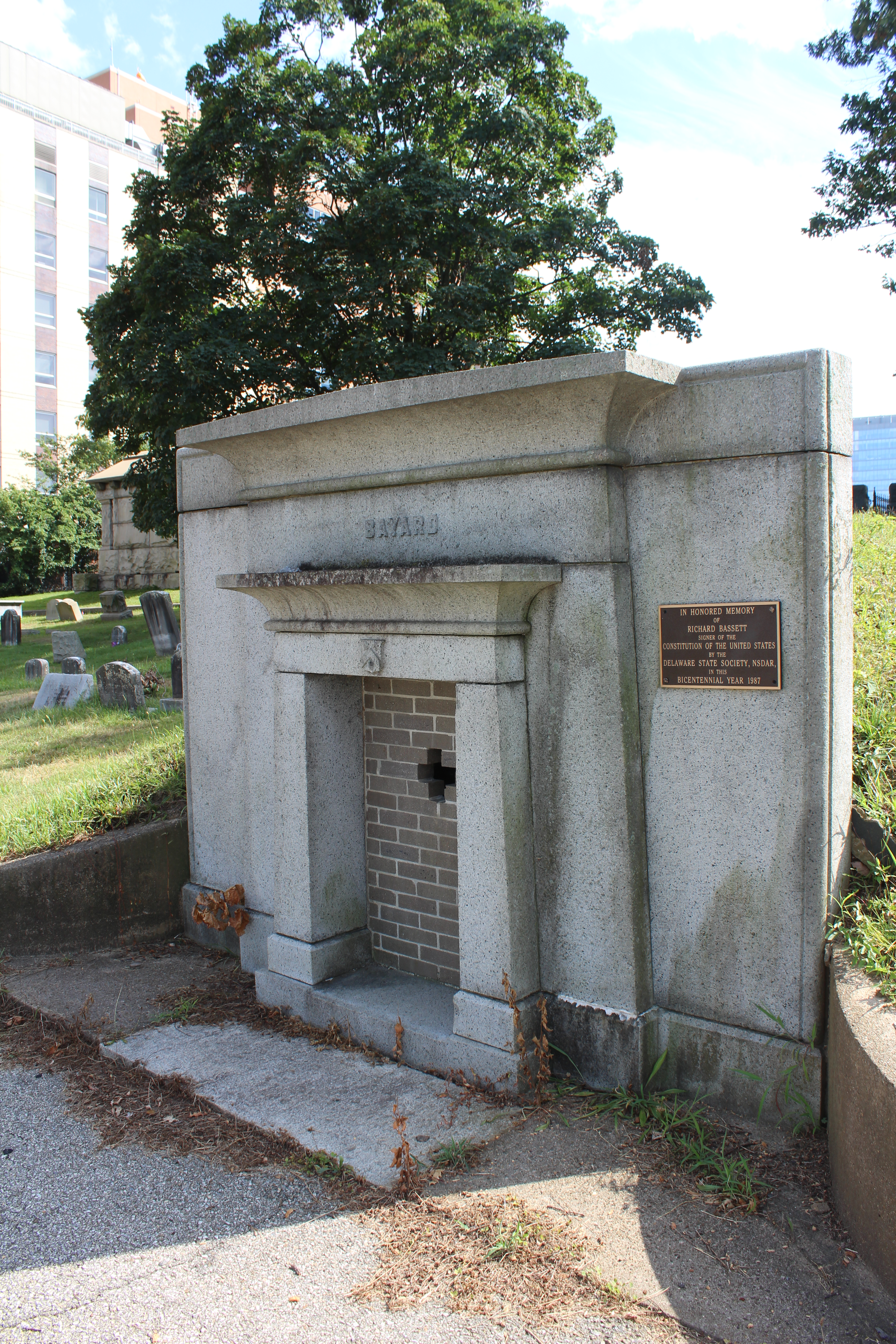
Richard Bassett grave in Wilmington and Brandywine Cemetery

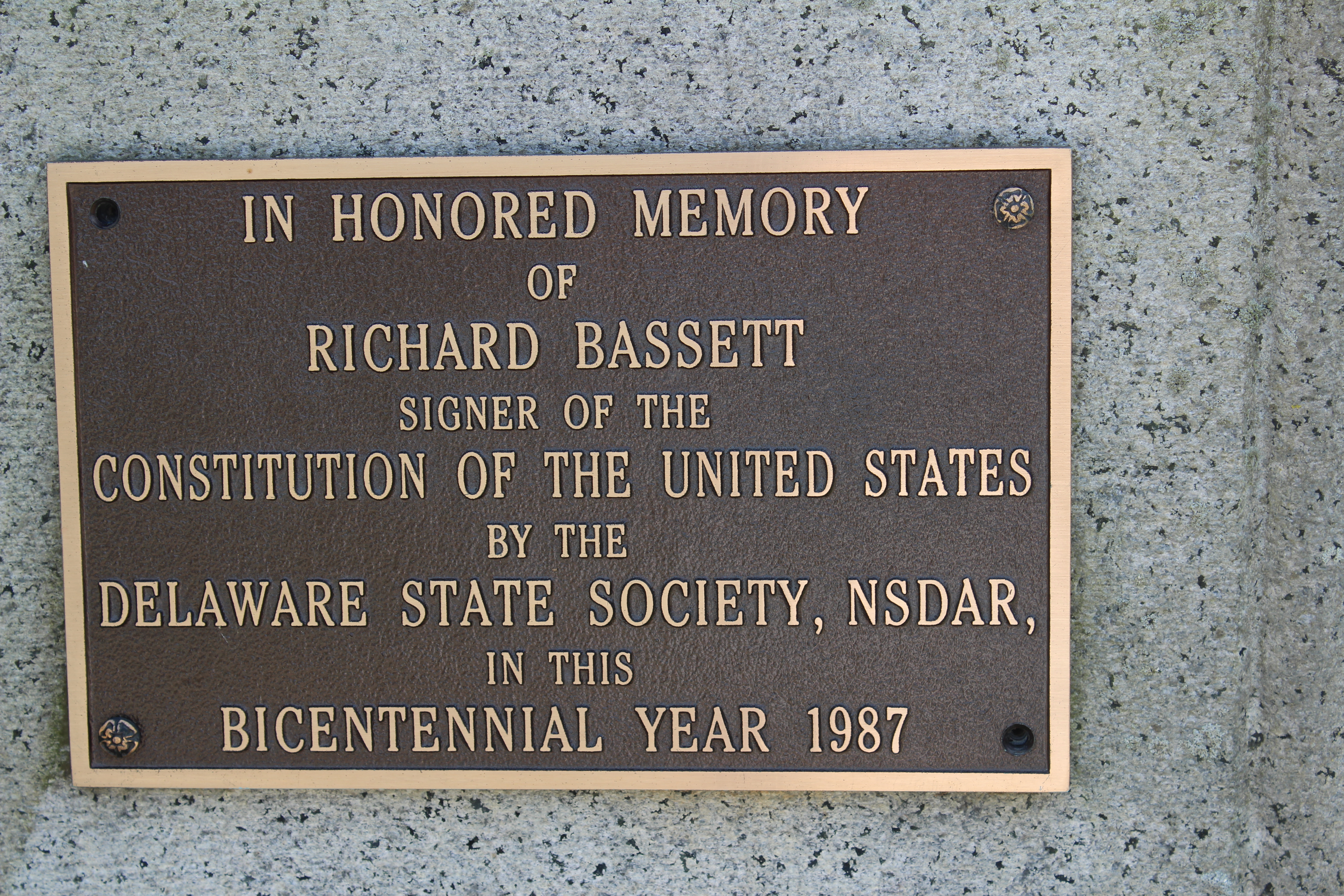
Closeup of plaque on Richard Bassett's grave

After leaving the federal bench, Bassett became a planter in Cecil County.

While he was a slave owner, after converting to Methodism in the 1780s, he freed his slaves and campaigned for the state of Delaware to abolish slavery.

He died on September 15, 1815, on his estate Bohemia Manor in Cecil County. (Note: Some sources give his place of death as Kent County, Delaware.) He was initially interred in Cecil County, and in 1865 his remains were re-interred in Wilmington and Brandywine Cemetery in Wilmington, Delaware.

== Legacy ==
Bassett was the grandfather of Richard H. Bayard and James A. Bayard Jr., both United States senators from Delaware.

Bassett Street in Madison, Wisconsin, is named in Bassett's honor.

Bassettown, now Washington, Pennsylvania, was named in Bassett's honor by his cousin David Hoge.

== Sources ==
- Conrad, Henry C. (1908). History of the State of Delaware. Lancaster, Pennsylvania: Wickersham Company.
- Hoffecker, Carol E. (2004). Democracy in Delaware. Wilmington, Delaware: Cedar Tree Books. ISBN 1-892142-23-6.
- Munroe, John A. (1954). Federalist Delaware 1775–1815. Rutgers University, New Brunswick.
- Martin, Roger A. (1984). History of Delaware Through its Governors. Wilmington, Delaware: McClafferty Press.
- Martin, Roger A. (1995). Memoirs of the Senate. Newark, Delaware: Roger A. Martin.
- Scharf, John Thomas (1888). History of Delaware 1609–1888. 2 vols. Philadelphia: L. J. Richards & Co. ISBN 0-87413-493-5.

== Images ==
- National Portrait Gallery; portrait courtesy of the National Portrait Gallery.

Party political offices
Preceded by Gunning Bedford Sr.	Federalist nominee for Governor of Delaware; 1798	Succeeded by Nathaniel Mitchell
U.S. Senate
New seat	United States Senator (Class 2) from Delaware; 1789–1793	Succeeded by John Vining
Political offices
Preceded by Daniel Rogers	Governor of Delaware; 1799–1801	Succeeded by James Sykes
Legal offices
New title Seat established by 2 Stat. 89	Judge of the United States Circuit Court for the Third Circuit; 1801–1802	Succeeded by Seat abolished
