= James Sykes (governor) =

American politician (1761–1822)

14th Governor of Delaware
- In office March 3, 1801 – January 19, 1802
- Preceded by: Richard Bassett
- Succeeded by: David Hall

Member of the Delaware Senate
- In office January 6, 1794 – January 6, 1797; January 6, 1798 – February 20, 1801; January 6, 1802 – January 6, 1813

Personal details
- Born: March 27, 1761 Dover, Delaware Colony
- Died: October 18, 1822 (aged 61) Dover, Delaware
- Party: Federalist Democratic-Republican
- Spouse: Elizabeth Goldsborough
- Profession: Physician

James Sykes (March 27, 1761 – October 18, 1822) was an American medical doctor and politician from Dover, in Kent County, Delaware. He was a member of the Federalist Party, who served in the Delaware General Assembly and as Governor of Delaware.

== Early life and family ==
James Sykes was born near Dover, Delaware, the son of James and Agnes Sykes. His father was a member of the Delaware General Assembly and a delegate to the Continental Congress. James Jr. studied medicine under Dr. Joshua Clayton and first practiced in Cambridge, Maryland. While there he married Elizabeth Goldsborough, daughter of Judge Robert Goldsborough. After four years they returned to Dover living on The Green. They had three children; James, Anna Matilda, and William, and were members of Christ Episcopal Church. Their house is now an office building.

== Professional and political career ==
In 1791 the Delaware General Assembly appointed Sykes to help manage a lottery to raise one thousand pounds to defray expenses incurred in constructing a new state house. After serving as clerk for the State House in 1796, he was elected to the State Senate in 1793. He served one term for the 1794, 1795, and 1796 sessions. Returning a year later, he served six more terms from the 1798 session through the 1812 session. He was Speaker in 1801, and then in every session from 1804 through 1812. He was also the Democratic-Republican nominee in all three of Delaware's U.S. Senate elections in 1798 and 1799.

On February 20, 1801, Governor Richard Bassett resigned following his appointment as U.S. Circuit Court Judge by U.S. President John Adams. As the Speaker of the State Senate, Sykes was next in line of succession and took office as governor. He chose not to run for election in his right, and returned to the State Senate on January 19, 1802.

In the meantime, Sykes had become one of the state's most renowned surgeons. From his office at 45 The Green in Dover, he specialized in treating gallstones and yellow fever. In 1814 he moved his practice to New York City for six years, but then returned to the Dover practice with his son, James. In 1822 he became President of the Delaware Medical Society.

== Death and legacy ==
Sykes died at Dover and is buried there in the Christ Episcopal Church Cemetery. His son, James, was a physician in Dover and his son, William, was the father of Major General George Sykes, a commander at Gettysburg in the American Civil War.

== Almanac ==
Elections were held the first Tuesday of October, and members of the General Assembly took office the first Tuesday of January. State senators had a three-year term. The governor took office the third Tuesday of January and had a three-year term. However, Sykes served as State President, only filling the vacancy caused by the resignation of Richard Bassett.

Delaware General Assembly (sessions while governor)
Year	Assembly	Senate majority	Speaker	House majority	Speaker
1801	25th	Federalist	vacant	Federalist	Stephen Lewis

Public offices
Office	Type	Location	Began office	Ended office	notes
State Senator	Legislature	Dover	January 6, 1794	January 6, 1797	
State Senator	Legislature	Dover	January 6, 1798	January 6, 1801	
State Senator	Legislature	Dover	January 6, 1801	February 20, 1801	
Governor	Executive	Dover	February 20, 1801	January 19, 1802	acting
State Senator	Legislature	Dover	January 6, 1802	January 6, 1804	
State Senator	Legislature	Dover	January 6, 1804	January 6, 1807	
State Senator	Legislature	Dover	January 6, 1807	January 6, 1810	
State Senator	Legislature	Dover	January 6, 1810	January 6, 1813	

Delaware General Assembly service
Dates	Assembly	Chamber	Majority	Governor	Committees	District
1794	18th	State Senate	Federalist	Joshua Clayton		Kent at-large
1795	19th	State Senate	Federalist	Joshua Clayton		Kent at-large
1796	20th	State Senate	Federalist	Gunning Bedford Sr.		Kent at-large
1798	22nd	State Senate	Federalist	Daniel Rogers		Kent at-large
1799	23rd	State Senate	Federalist	Richard Bassett		Kent at-large
1800	24th	State Senate	Federalist	Richard Bassett	Speaker	Kent at-large
1801	25th	State Senate	Federalist	Richard Bassett	Speaker	Kent at-large
1802	26th	State Senate	Federalist	David Hall		Kent at-large
1803	27th	State Senate	Federalist	David Hall	Speaker	Kent at-large
1804	28th	State Senate	Federalist	David Hall	Speaker	Kent at-large
1805	29th	State Senate	Federalist	Nathaniel Mitchell	Speaker	Kent at-large
1806	30th	State Senate	Federalist	Nathaniel Mitchell	Speaker	Kent at-large
1807	31st	State Senate	Federalist	Nathaniel Mitchell	Speaker	Kent at-large
1808	32nd	State Senate	Federalist	George Truitt	Speaker	Kent at-large
1809	33rd	State Senate	Federalist	George Truitt	Speaker	Kent at-large
1810	34th	State Senate	Federalist	George Truitt	Speaker	Kent at-large
1811	35th	State Senate	Federalist	Joseph Haslet	Speaker	Kent at-large
1812	36th	State Senate	Federalist	Joseph Haslet	Speaker	Kent at-large

== Places with more information ==
- Delaware Historical Society; website; 505 North Market Street, Wilmington, Delaware 19801; (302) 655-7161
- University of Delaware; Library website; 181 South College Avenue, Newark, Delaware 19717; (302) 831–2965

Political offices
Preceded by Richard Bassett	Governor of Delaware; 1801–1802	Succeeded by David Hall
