= Daniel Rogers (politician) =

American politician (1754–1806)

12th Governor of Delaware
- In office September 30, 1797 – January 9, 1799
- Preceded by: Gunning Bedford Sr.
- Succeeded by: Richard Bassett

Personal details
- Born: January 3, 1754 Accomac County, Colony of Virginia
- Died: February 2, 1806 (aged 52) Milford, Delaware
- Party: Federalist
- Spouse(s): Esther O. Cropper; Nancy Russum
- Occupation: Miller

Daniel Rogers (January 3, 1754 – February 2, 1806) was an American miller and politician from Milford, in Sussex County, Delaware. He was a member of the Federalist Party, who served in the Delaware General Assembly and as Governor of Delaware.

== Early life and family ==
Rogers was born on a farm in Accomack County, Virginia, near Pungoteague, son of James and Patience Rogers. Generations earlier, about 1665, the family came from England to the Virginia Eastern Shore. His first wife was Esther O. (Nutter) Cropper, the wealthy widow of Molton Cropper of Milford, Delaware. Daniel and Esther had five children: James Rogers, Thomas W. Rogers, Elizabeth "Betsey" Rogers, Molton Cropper Rogers and Daniel Nutter Rogers. The family lived at the Causey Mansion in Milford, which was named for a subsequent governor of Delaware, Peter F. Causey, who lived there later. After the death of Esther, Daniel Rogers married Nancy Ann Russum, with whom he had seven more children: John Rogers, Samuel Rogers, Clement S. Rogers, Hannah Wise Rogers, William Rogers, Mary Rogers and Henry Rogers. They were members of Christ Episcopal Church in Milford.

== Professional and political career ==
Rogers came to Cedar Creek Hundred, in Sussex County, Delaware, about 1775, and acquired a farm there. Following his first marriage in 1778 and his acquisition of the Cropper property, he bought various milling operations in the area, including the Haven Mills which were north of Milford in Kent County. He also bought a brick granary at Argo's Corner and a tavern at Cedar Creek Village.

He was elected to the State House of Representatives for the 1791–92 session and then was elected twice as the Speaker. He served from 1793 until he became Governor of Delaware and was Speaker the entire time. On September 30, 1797, Governor Gunning Bedford Sr. died and Rogers succeeded to the office. He served as governor from that date until January 15, 1799. He returned to the State Senate in 1802 and served two terms until his death which occurred while he was still in office.

== Death and legacy ==
Rogers died at his home in Milford and was buried on his property there, facing the plaza at Causey Avenue and South Walnut Street. In 1917 the state moved his remains to the Odd Fellows Cemetery at Milford.

His oldest son, James Rogers, moved to New Castle, Delaware, and later served as chief justice of the Court of Common Pleas, Attorney General and Secretary of State of Delaware.

There is no known portrait of Daniel Rogers.

Delaware General Assembly (sessions while Governor)
Year	Assembly	Senate majority	Speaker	House majority	Speaker
1798	22nd	Federalist	Isaac Davis	Federalist	Stephen Lewis

== Places with more information ==
- Delaware Historical Society; website; 505 North Market Street, Wilmington, Delaware 19801; (302) 655-7161.
- University of Delaware; Library website; 181 South College Avenue, Newark, Delaware 19717; (302) 831–2965.

Political offices
Preceded by Gunning Bedford Sr.	Governor of Delaware; 1797–1799	Succeeded by Richard Bassett
