= Delaware General Assembly delegations from New Castle County =

A table of the members of the Delaware General Assembly from New Castle County and the Governors.

== Delaware senators under the Constitution of 1776 ==
During this period the Upper House of the Delaware General Assembly was known as the Legislative Council and its members were Legislative Councillors. The terms "Senate" and "Senator" came into use with the adoption of the U.S. Constitution of 1787. Legislative Councillors were not the same as and should not be confused with Privy Councillors, the persons serving on the Delaware Privy Council.

From 1776 to 1792 elections were held on the first day of October of the year noted. Terms for members of the General Assembly began on the twentieth day of October in the same year. If either date fell on a Sunday, the following day was prescribed. They met three times each year, generally in October, February and May. Members of the House of Assembly had a term of one year and members of the Legislative Council had a term of three years. Three State Councilmen and seven State Assemblymen were elected, at large, from each county.

The alternating grey and white boxes indicate the duration of the actual three year Council terms.

| Presidents | Session | 1 | Class 1 councillors | 2 | Class 2 councillors | 3 | Class 3 councillors |
|---|---|---|---|---|---|---|---|
| John McKinly; Thomas McKean | 1st (1776/1777) | - | Nicholas Van Dyke | - | George Read | - | Richard Cantwell |
| George Read; Caesar Rodney | 2nd (1777/1778) | - | Nicholas Van Dyke | - | George Read | - | Peter Hyatt |
| Caesar Rodney | 3rd (1778/1779) | - | Samuel Patterson | - | George Read | - | Peter Hyatt |
| Caesar Rodney | 4th (1779/1780) | - | Samuel Patterson | - | Richard Cantwell | - | Peter Hyatt |
| Caesar Rodney | 5th (1780/1781) | - | Thomas McDonough Sr. | - | Richard Cantwell | - | Peter Hyatt |
| John Dickinson | 6th (1781/1782) | - | Thomas McDonough Sr. | - | Isaac Grantham | - | Peter Hyatt |
| John Cook | 7th (1782/1783) | - | Thomas McDonough Sr. | - | Isaac Grantham | - | George Read |
| Nicholas Van Dyke | 8th (1783/1784) | - | Thomas McDonough Sr. | - | Isaac Grantham | - | George Read |
| Nicholas Van Dyke | 9th (1784/1785) | - | Thomas McDonough Sr. | - | George Craighead | - | George Read |
| Nicholas Van Dyke | 10th (1785/1786) | - | Thomas McDonough Sr. | - | George Craighead | - | George Read |
| Thomas Collins | 11th (1786/1787) | - | Nicholas Van Dyke | - | George Craighead | - | George Read |
| Thomas Collins | 12th (1787/1788) | - | Thomas McDonough Sr. | - | George Read Jr. | - | George Read |
| Jehu Davis | 13th (1788/1789) | - | Nicholas Van Dyke | - | Thomas Kean | - | Gunning Bedford Sr. |
| Joshua Clayton | 14th (1789/1790) | - | Alexander Porter Jr. | - | Thomas Kean | - | Gunning Bedford Sr. |
| Joshua Clayton | 15th (1790/1791) | - | Alexander Porter Jr. | - | Thomas Kean | - | Gunning Bedford Sr. |
| Joshua Clayton | 16th (1791/1792) | - | Nehemiah Tilton | - | Thomas Kean | - | Archibald Alexander |

== Delaware senators under the Constitution of 1792 ==
The State Senate had a term of three years. Three state senators were elected, at large, from each county.

The alternating grey and white boxes indicate the duration of the actual three year Senate terms.

| Governors | Session | 1 | Class 1 senators | 2 | Class 2 senators | 3 | Class 3 senators |
|---|---|---|---|---|---|---|---|
| Joshua Clayton | 17th (1793) | - | Robert Haughey | - | Archibald Alexander | - | John Dickinson |
| Joshua Clayton | 18th (1794) | - | Isaac Grantham | - | Archibald Alexander | - | Thomas Kean |
| Joshua Clayton | 19th (1795) | - | Isaac Grantham | - | John Stockton | - | Thomas Kean |
| Gunning Bedford Sr. | 20th (1796) | - | Alexander Porter Jr. | - | John James | - | Thomas Kean |
| Gunning Bedford Sr. | 21st (1797) | - | Alexander Porter Jr. | - | John James | - | Archibald Alexander |
| Daniel Rogers | 22nd (1798) | - | Edward Roche | - | John James | - | Archibald Alexander |
| Richard Bassett | 23rd (1799) | - | Isaac Grantham | - | John James | - | Archibald Alexander |
| Richard Bassett | 24th (1800) | - | Isaac Grantham | - | Peter Brynberg | - | Archibald Alexander |
| James Sykes Jr. | 25th (1801) | - | Isaac Grantham | - | John Bird | - | Thomas Fitzgerald |
| David Hall | 26th (1802) | - | Robert Maxwell | - | John Bird | - | Thomas Fitzgerald |
| David Hall | 27th (1803) | - | John Way | - | John Bird | - | Thomas Fitzgerald |
| David Hall | 28th (1804) | - | John Way | - | John Bird | - | Thomas Fitzgerald |
| Nathaniel Mitchell | 29th (1805) | - | John Way | - | William Cooch | - | Thomas Fitzgerald |
| Nathaniel Mitchell | 30th (1806) | - | John Way | - | George Clark Jr. | - | Thomas Fitzgerald |
| Nathaniel Mitchell | 31st (1807) | - | John Way | - | George Clark Jr. | - | Thomas Perkins |
| George Truitt | 32nd (1808) | - | John Way | - | John Merritt | - | Thomas Perkins |
| George Truitt | 33rd (1809) | - | John Way | - | John Merritt | - | Thomas Perkins |
| George Truitt | 34th (1810) | - | John Way | - | John Merritt | - | Andrew Reynolds |
| Joseph Haslet | 35th (1811) | - | John Way | - | Francis H. Haughey | - | Andrew Reynolds |
| Joseph Haslet | 36th (1812) | - | John Way | - | Francis H. Haughey | - | Andrew Reynolds |
| Joseph Haslet | 37th (1813) | - | John Way | - | Francis H. Haughey | - | Samuel H. Black |
| Daniel Rodney | 38th (1814) | - | John Way | - | Abraham Staats | - | Samuel H. Black |
| Daniel Rodney | 39th (1815) | - | Caesar A. Rodney | - | Abraham Staats | - | Samuel H. Black |
| Daniel Rodney | 40th (1816) | - | Caesar A. Rodney | - | Abraham Staats | - | Nicholas Van Dyke Jr. |
| John Clark | 41st (1817) | - | Caesar A. Rodney | - | George Clark Jr. | - | Nicholas Van Dyke Jr. |
| John Clark | 42nd (1818) | - | Andrew Gray | - | George Clark Jr. | - | Samuel H. Black |
| John Clark | 43rd (1819) | - | Andrew Gray | - | George Clark Jr. | - | Samuel H. Black |
| Jacob Stout | 44th (1820) | - | Andrew Gray | - | Jacob Vandergrift | - | Samuel H. Black |
| John Collins | 45th (1821) | - | Victor du Pont | - | Jacob Vandergrift | - | Samuel H. Black |
| Caleb Rodney | 46th (1822) | - | Victor du Pont | - | Jacob Vandergrift | - | Charles Thomas Jr. |
| Joseph Haslet; Charles Thomas Jr. | 47th (1823) | - | Victor du Pont | - | William Weldon, II | - | Charles Thomas Jr. |
| Samuel Paynter | 48th (1824) | - | John Erwin | - | William Weldon, II | - | Charles Thomas Jr. |
| Samuel Paynter | 49th (1825) | - | John Erwin | - | William Weldon, II | - | Henry Whiteley |
| Samuel Paynter | 50th (1826) | - | John Erwin | - | Christopher Vandergrift | - | Henry Whiteley |
| Charles Polk Jr. | 51st (1827) | - | Joseph England | - | Christopher Vandergrift | - | Henry Whiteley |
| Charles Polk Jr. | 52nd (1828) | - | John Harlan | - | Levi Boulden | - | Thomas Deakyne |
| Charles Polk Jr. | 53rd (1829) | - | John Harlan | - | Levi Boulden | - | Thomas Deakyne |
| David Hazzard | 54th (1830) | - | William T. Read | - | John Caulk | - | Thomas Deakyne |
| David Hazzard | 55th (1831) | - | William T. Read | - | John Caulk | - | Jacob Alrichs |
| David Hazzard | 56th (1832) | - | James Booth | - | John Sutton | - | Jacob Alrichs |

== Delaware senators under the Constitution of 1831 ==
The State Senate had a term of four years. Three state senators were elected, at large, from each county.

The alternating grey and white boxes indicate the duration of the actual four year Senate terms.

| Governors | Session | 1 | Class 1 senators | 2 | Class 2 senators | 3 | Class 3 senators |
|---|---|---|---|---|---|---|---|
| Caleb P. Bennett | 57th (1833/1834) | - | James Booth | - | John Sutton | - | Richard H. Bayard |
| Charles Polk Jr. | 58th (1835/1836) | - | John D. Dilworth | - | Thomas W. Handy | - | Archibald Hamilton |
| Cornelius P. Comegys | 59th (1837/1838) | - | John D. Dilworth | - | William Herdman | - | Christopher Brooks |
| Cornelius P. Comegys | 60th (1839/1840) | - | Abraham Boyce | - | William Herdman | - | Thomas Deaknye |
| William B. Cooper | 61st (1841/1842) | - | Abraham Boyce | - | Charles I. du Pont | - | Andrew S. Naudain |
| William B. Cooper | 62nd (1843/1844) | - | David McAllister | - | Charles I. du Pont | - | Robert Ocheltree |
| Thomas Stockton; Joseph Maull; William Temple | 63rd (1845/1846) | - | David McAllister | - | Mahlon Betts | - | Robert Ocheltree |
| William Tharp | 64th (1847/1848) | - | Samuel Burnham | - | Mahlon Betts | - | John D. Turner |
| William Tharp | 65th (1849/1850) | - | Samuel Burnham | - | James H. Hoffecker | - | John D. Turner |
| William H. H. Ross | 66th (1851/1852) | - | Bassett Ferguson | - | James H. Hoffecker | - | William Smith |
| William H. H. Ross | 67th (1853/1854) | - | Bassett Ferguson | - | Charles I. du Pont | - | William Smith |
| Peter F. Causey | 68th (1855/1856) | - | Archibald Armstrong | - | Charles I. du Pont | - | Sewell C. Biggs |
| Peter F. Causey | 69th (1857/1858) | - | Archibald Armstrong | - | Abraham Boyce | - | Sewell C. Biggs |
| William Burton | 70th (1859/1860) | - | David W. Gemmell | - | Abraham Boyce | - | Charles T. Polk |
| William Burton | 71st (1861/1862) | - | David W. Gemmell | - | John R. Tatum | - | Charles T. Polk |
| William Cannon | 72nd (1863/1864) | - | John P. Belville | - | John R. Tatum | - | John F. Williamson |
| Gove Saulsbury | 73rd (1865/1866) | - | John P. Belville | - | Isaac S. Elliott | - | John F. Williamson |
| Gove Saulsbury | 74th (1867/1868) | - | Curtis B. Ellison | - | Isaac S. Elliott | - | John G. Jackson |
| Gove Saulsbury | 75th (1869/1870) | - | Curtis B. Ellison | - | Charles Gooding | - | John G. Jackson |
| James Ponder | 76th (1871/1872) | - | Allen V. Lesley | - | Charles Gooding | - | Leonard G. Vandegrift |
| James Ponder | 77th (1873/1874) | - | Allen V. Lesley | - | Leander F. Riddle | - | Leonard G. Vandegrift |
| John P. Cochran | 78th (1875/1876) | - | Henry Davis | - | Leander F. Riddle | - | James H. Ray |
| John P. Cochran | 79th (1877/1878) | - | Henry Davis | - | Harry Sharpley | - | James H. Ray |
| John W. Hall | 80th (1879/1880) | - | Joseph W. Cooch | - | Harry Sharpley | - | Charles H. McWhorter |
| John W. Hall | 81st (1881/1882) | - | Joseph W. Cooch | - | Edward Betts | - | Charles H. McWhorter |
| Charles C. Stockley | 82nd (1883/1884) | - | Swithin Chandler | - | Edward Betts | - | Alexander B. Cooper |
| Charles C. Stockley | 83rd (1885/1886) | - | Swithin Chandler | - | Charles H. McWhorter | - | Alexander B. Cooper |
| Benjamin T. Biggs | 84th (1887/1888) | - | Calvin W. Crossan | - | Charles H. McWhorter | - | Colen Ferguson |
| Benjamin T. Biggs | 85th (1889/1890) | - | Calvin W. Crossan | - | John P. Donohoe | - | Colen Ferguson |
| Robert J. Reynolds | 86th (1891/1892) | - | James McMullin | - | John P. Donohoe | - | John Pilling |
| Robert J. Reynolds | 87th (1893/1894) | - | James McMullin | - | John C. Pyle | - | John Pilling |
| Joshua H. Marvil; William T. Watson | 88th (1895/1896) | - | Samuel Alrichs | - | John C. Pyle | - | Robert J. Hanby |
| Ebe W. Tunnell | 89th (1897/1898) | - | Samuel Alrichs | - | John C. Pyle | - | Robert J. Hanby |

== Delaware senators under the Constitution of 1897 before the 1965 reapportionment ==
The alternating grey and white boxes indicate the duration of the actual four year Senate terms.

| Governors | Session | 1 | Class 1 senators | 2 | Class 2 senators | 3 | Class 3 senators | 4 | Class 4 senators | 5 | Class 5 senators | 6 | Class 6 senators | 7 | Class 7 senators |
|---|---|---|---|---|---|---|---|---|---|---|---|---|---|---|---|
| Ebe W. Tunnell | 90th (1899/1900) | - | | | | | | | | | | | | | |
| John Hunn | 91st (1901/1902) | - | | | | | | | | | | | | | |
| John Hunn | 92nd (1903/1904) | - | | | | | | | | | | | | | |
| Preston Lea | 93rd (1905/1906) | - | | | | | | | | | | | | | |
| Preston Lea | 94th (1907/1908) | - | | | | | | | | | | | | | |
| Simeon S. Pennewill | 95th (1909/1910) | - | | | | | | | | | | | | | |
| Simeon S. Pennewill | 96th (1911/1912) | - | | | | | | | | | | | | | |
| Charles R. Miller | 97th (1913/1914) | - | | | | | | | | | | | | | |
| Charles R. Miller | 98th (1915/1916) | - | | | | | | | | | | | | | |
| John G. Townsend Jr. | 99th (1917/1918) | - | | | | | | | | | | | | | |
| John G. Townsend Jr. | 100th (1919/1920) | - | | | | | | | | | | | | | |
| William D. Denney | 101st (1921/1922) | - | | | | | | | | | | | | | |
| William D. Denney | 102nd (1923/1924) | - | | | | | | | | | | | | | |
| Robert P. Robinson | 103rdh (1925/1926) | - | | | | | | | | | | | | | |
| Robert P. Robinson | 104th (1927/1928) | - | | | | | | | | | | | | | |
| C. Douglass Buck | 105th (1929/1930) | - | | | | | | | | | | | | | |
| C. Douglass Buck | 106th (1931/1932) | - | | | | | | | | | | | | | |
| C. Douglass Buck | 107th (1933/1934) | - | | | | | | | | | | | | | |
| C. Douglass Buck | 108th (1935/1936) | - | | | | | | | | | | | | | |
| Richard C. McMullen | 109th (1937/1938) | - | | | | | | | | | | | | | |
| Richard C. McMullen | 110th (1939/1940) | - | | | | | | | | | | | | | |
| Walter W. Bacon | 111th (1941/1942) | - | | | | | | | | | | | | | |
| Walter W. Bacon | 112th (1943/1944) | - | | | | | | | | | | | | | |
| Walter W. Bacon | 113th (1945/1946) | - | | | | | | | | | | | | | |
| Walter W. Bacon | 114th (1947/1948) | - | | | | | | | | | | | | | |
| Elbert N. Carvel | 115th (1949/1950) | - | | | | | | | | | | | | | |
| Elbert N. Carvel | 116th (1951/1952) | - | | | | | | | | | | | | | |
| J. Caleb Boggs; David P. Buckson | 117th (1953/1954) | - | | | | | | | | | | | | | |
| J. Caleb Boggs; David P. Buckson | 118th (1955/1956) | - | | | | | | | | | | | | | |
| J. Caleb Boggs; David P. Buckson | 119th (1957/1958) | - | | | | | | | | | | | | | |
| J. Caleb Boggs; David P. Buckson | 120th (1959/1960) | - | | | | | | | | | | | | | |
| Elbert N. Carvel | 121st (1961/1962) | - | | | | | | | | | | | | | |
| Elbert N. Carvel | 122nd (1963/1964) | - | | | | | | | | | | | | | |
