= 32nd Delaware General Assembly =

American legislative session

| ← | 31st | 33rd | → |

Overview
- Legislative body: Delaware General Assembly
- Term: January 5, 1808 – January 3, 1809

The 32nd Delaware General Assembly was a meeting of the legislative branch of the state government, consisting of the Delaware Senate and the Delaware House of Representatives. Elections were held the first Tuesday of October and terms began on the first Tuesday in January. It met in Dover, Delaware, convening January 5, 1808, two weeks before the beginning of the first year of the administration of Governor George Truitt.

The apportionment of seats was permanently assigned to three senators and seven representatives for each of the three counties. Population of the county did not effect the number of delegates. Both chambers had a Federalist majority.

== Leadership ==
=== Senate ===
- James Sykes Jr., Kent County

=== House of Representatives ===
- Stephen Lewis, Kent County

== Members ==
=== Senate ===
Senators were elected by the public for a three-year term, one third posted each year.

New Castle County

- John Merritt
- Thomas Perkins
- John Way

Kent County

- Thomas Clayton
- George Cummins
- James Sykes Jr.

Sussex County

- Charles Draper
- Samuel Paynter
- Caleb Rodney

=== House of Representatives ===
Representatives were elected by the public for a one-year term.

New Castle County

- John Bird
- Jesse Higgins
- David Morrison
- Andrew Reynolds
- William Robinson
- Leonard Vandergrift
- Peter Williams

Kent County

- John Adams
- Stephen Lewis
- Henry Molleston
- John Pleasanton
- James B. Ralston
- Henry M. Ridgely
- William C. Torbert

Sussex County

- Joshua Burton
- Thomas Cooper
- Edward Dingle Jr.
- Jesse Green
- Robert Hill
- John Polk
- Nathan Vickers

== Places with more information ==
- Delaware Historical Society; website; 505 North Market Street, Wilmington, Delaware 19801; (302) 655-7161.
- University of Delaware; Library website; 181 South College Avenue, Newark, Delaware 19717; (302) 831–2965.
