= 1820 Delaware gubernatorial special election =

- October 3, 1820

Nominee	John Collins	Jesse Green
Party	Democratic-Republican	Federalist
Popular vote	3,970	3,520
Percentage	53.00%	47.00%
- County results Haslet: 50–60% 60–70% Booth: 50–60%
Governor before election
Jacob Stout
Federalist
Elected Governor
John Collins
Democratic-Republican

The 1820 Delaware gubernatorial special election was held on October 3, 1820. The winner of the 1819 gubernatorial election, Henry Molleston, died before assuming office, elevating State Senate Speaker Jacob Stout to the governorship and triggering an election in 1820. However, the election was not just for the remainder of Molleston's term, but instead for a full three-year term.

Jesse Green was the Federalist nominee to succeed Stout and ran against Democratic-Republican nominee John Collins. Collins defeated Green by a slim margin, becoming the first Democratic-Republican Governor of Delaware since 1810. However, Collins died in office on April 16, 1822, triggering another special election in 1822.

== General election ==
=== Results ===
1820 Delaware gubernatorial election
Party	Candidate	Votes	%	±%
Democratic-Republican	John Collins	3,970	53.00%	+7.56%
Federalist	Jesse Green	3,520	47.00%	−7.56%
Majority		450	6.01%	−3.10%
Turnout		7,490	100.00%	
Democratic-Republican gain from Federalist				

== Bibliography ==
- Gubernatorial Elections, 1787-1997. Washington, D.C.: Congressional Quarterly Inc. 1998. ISBN 1-56802-396-0.
- Glashan, Roy R. (1979). American Governors and Gubernatorial Elections, 1775-1978. Meckler Books. ISBN 0-930466-17-9.
- Dubin, Michael J. (2003). United States Gubernatorial Elections, 1776-1860: The Official Results by State and County. Jefferson, North Carolina: McFarland. ISBN 978-0-7864-1439-0.
