= 33rd Delaware General Assembly =

American legislative session

←	32nd	34th	→

Overview
- Legislative body: Delaware General Assembly
- Term: January 3, 1809 – January 2, 1810

The 33rd Delaware General Assembly was a meeting of the legislative branch of the state government, consisting of the Delaware Senate and the Delaware House of Representatives. Elections were held the first Tuesday of October and terms began on the first Tuesday in January. It met in Dover, Delaware, convening January 3, 1809, two weeks before the beginning of the second year of the administration of Governor George Truitt.

The apportionment of seats was permanently assigned to three senators and seven representatives for each of the three counties. Population of the county did not effect the number of delegates. Both chambers had a Federalist majority.

== Leadership ==
=== Senate ===
- James Sykes Jr., Kent County

=== House of Representatives ===
- Stephen Lewis, Kent County

== Members ==
=== Senate ===
Senators were elected by the public for a three-year term, one third posted each year.

New Castle County

- John Merritt
- Thomas Perkins
- John Way

Kent County

- George Cummins
- John Lockwood
- James Sykes Jr.

Sussex County

- Thomas Cooper
- Samuel Paynter
- Caleb Rodney

=== House of Representatives ===
Representatives were elected by the public for a one-year term.

New Castle County

- John Bird
- Levi Boulden
- Jesse Higgins
- Thomas Phillips
- William D. Phillips
- Andrew Reynolds
- Leonard Vandergrift

Kent County

- Edward Joy
- Stephen Lewis
- Nicholas Loockerman
- John Marim
- Stephen Paradee
- James B. Ralston
- Henry M. Ridgely

Sussex County

- Joshua Burton
- William Hazzard
- Robert Hill
- Armwell Long
- Nathaniel Mitchell
- Solomon Moore
- Peter Robinson

== Places with more information ==
- Delaware Historical Society; website; 505 North Market Street, Wilmington, Delaware 19801; (302) 655-7161.
- University of Delaware; Library website; 181 South College Avenue, Newark, Delaware 19717; (302) 831–2965.
