= 1819 Delaware gubernatorial election =

- October 5, 1819

Nominee	Henry Molleston	Manaen Bull
Party	Federalist	Democratic-Republican
Popular vote	3,823	3,185
Percentage	54.55%	45.45%
- Molleston: 50–60% 60–70% Bull: 60–70%
Governor before election
John Clark
Federalist
Elected Governor
Henry Molleston †
Federalist

The 1819 Delaware gubernatorial election was held on October 5, 1819. Incumbent Federalist Governor John Clark was unable to seek re-election due to term limits. State Senator Henry Molleston ran as Clark's successor, winning the Federalist nomination. He faced Manaen Bull, Clark's 1816 opponent, and the Democratic-Republican nominee. Molleston won by a fairly wide margin, but died on November 11, 1819, prior to assuming office. State Senate President Jacob Stout became Governor and a special election was held in 1820.

== General election ==
=== Results ===
1819 Delaware gubernatorial election
Party	Candidate	Votes	%	±%
Federalist	Henry Molleston	3,823	54.55%	+1.29%
Democratic-Republican	Manaen Bull	3,185	45.45%	−1.29%
Majority		638	9.10%	+2.58%
Turnout		7,008	100.00%	
Federalist hold				

== Bibliography ==
- Gubernatorial Elections, 1787-1997. Washington, D.C.: Congressional Quarterly Inc. 1998. ISBN 1-56802-396-0.
- Glashan, Roy R. (1979). American Governors and Gubernatorial Elections, 1775-1978. Meckler Books. ISBN 0-930466-17-9.
- Dubin, Michael J. (2003). United States Gubernatorial Elections, 1776-1860: The Official Results by State and County. Jefferson, North Carolina: McFarland. ISBN 978-0-7864-1439-0.
