= 47th Delaware General Assembly =

American legislative session

←	46th	48th	→

Overview
- Legislative body: Delaware General Assembly
- Term: January 7, 1823 – January 6, 1824

The 47th Delaware General Assembly was a meeting of the legislative branch of the state government, consisting of the Delaware Senate and the Delaware House of Representatives. Elections were held the first Tuesday of October and terms began on the first Tuesday in January. It met in Dover, convening January 7, 1823, two weeks before the beginning of the year of the administration of Governor Joseph Haslet. He died June 20, 1823, and Governor Charles Thomas Jr. took administration.

The apportionment of seats was permanently assigned to three senators and seven representatives for each of the three counties. Population of the county did not affect the number of delegates. Both chambers had a Republican majority.

== Leadership ==
=== Senate ===
- Charles Thomas Jr., New Castle County

=== House of Representatives ===
- George Clark Jr., New Castle County

== Members ==
=== Senate ===
Senators were elected by the public for a three-year term, one third posted each year.

New Castle County

- Victor du Pont
- Charles Thomas Jr.
- William Weldon II

Kent County

- Thomas Clayton
- Willard Hall
- Maylove Hayes

Sussex County

- Jesse Green
- Joseph Maull
- Samuel Paynter

=== House of Representatives ===
Representatives were elected by the public for a one-year term.

New Castle County

- Samuel H. Black
- Jesse Chandler
- George Clark Jr.
- Richard E. Cochran
- David E. Nivin
- Andrew Reynolds
- William Seal

Kent County

- John Adams
- John Brinkle
- Andrew Calley
- William Hopkins
- Elias Naudain Jr.
- Robert Register
- Presley Spruance Jr.

Sussex County

- Joshua Burton
- Charles M. Cullen
- George Howard
- William N. Polk
- John Robinson
- Purnal Tindal
- Thomas Townsend

== Places with more information ==
- Delaware Historical Society; website; 505 North Market Street, Wilmington, Delaware 19801; (302) 655-7161.
- University of Delaware; Library website; 181 South College Avenue, Newark, Delaware 19717; (302) 831-2965.
