= Thomas Clayton =

American politician (1777–1854)

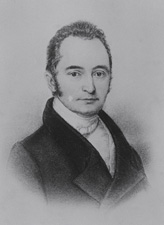

United States Senator from Delaware
- In office January 9, 1837 – March 3, 1847
- Preceded by: John M. Clayton
- Succeeded by: Presley Spruance
- In office January 8, 1824 – March 3, 1827
- Preceded by: Caesar Augustus Rodney
- Succeeded by: Louis McLane

Chief Justice of Delaware
- In office January 18, 1832 – January 9, 1837
- Preceded by: Samuel M. Harrington
- Succeeded by: John M. Clayton

Member of the U.S. House of Representatives from Delaware's first at-large district
- In office March 4, 1815 – March 3, 1817
- Preceded by: Henry M. Ridgely
- Succeeded by: Louis McLane

5th Attorney General of Delaware
- In office 1810–1815
- Governor: George Truitt; Joseph Haslet
- Preceded by: Edward W. Gilpin
- Succeeded by: George P. Fisher

Member of the Delaware Senate
- In office January 3, 1821 – January 6, 1824

Member of the Delaware House of Representatives
- In office January 4, 1803 – January 19, 1808; January 1, 1811 – January 3, 1815

Personal details
- Born: July 1777 Massey, Maryland
- Died: August 21, 1854 (aged 77) New Castle, Delaware, U.S.
- Party: Federalist; National Republican; Whig
- Spouse: Jennette Macomb
- Parent: Joshua Clayton (father)
- Education: Newark Academy
- Profession: Lawyer; politician

Thomas Clayton (July 1777 – August 21, 1854) was an American lawyer and politician from Dover in Kent County, Delaware. He was a member of the Federalist Party and later the National Republican Party and the Whig Party. He served in the Delaware General Assembly, as Attorney General of Delaware, as Secretary of State of Delaware, as Chief Justice of the Delaware Supreme Court, as U.S. Representative from Delaware, and as U.S. Senator from Delaware. In 1846 he was one of two members of the United States Senate to vote against declaring war on Mexico.

== Early life and family ==
Clayton was born at Massey, Maryland in Kent County, Maryland, son of the former Governor of Delaware, Dr. Joshua Clayton, and Rachael McCleary Clayton. It is said he was born while his mother was fleeing invading British troops on the way from their Elk River landing to the Battle of Brandywine. While the Clayton's were natives of Kent County, Rachael McCleary was the niece and adopted daughter of Richard Bassett, the aristocratic heir to the expansive Bohemia Manor estates. The family lived at Bohemia Manor, and through this connection, Joshua Clayton later acquired his homestead from these estates, in Pencader Hundred, New Castle County.

Thomas Clayton graduated from the Newark Academy, now the University of Delaware, studied law under Nicholas Ridgely in Dover, Delaware, and began a law practice there in 1799. His wife's name was Jennette Macomb, they had four children and belonged to the Presbyterian Church. He was the cousin of U.S. Senator John M. Clayton.

== Professional and political career ==
While pursuing his practice of the law, Clayton began his public career as the clerk of the Delaware House of Representatives in 1800. He then served as a member of that body for 8 years, between the 1803 session and the 1814 session. He was elected to the Delaware Senate for the 1808 session but resigned to become the Delaware Secretary of State for 2 years. Subsequently, he was appointed the Delaware Attorney General and served in that office from 1810 until 1815.

In 1814 Clayton was elected as a Federalist to one of two at-large seats Delaware had in the U.S. House of Representatives, and served one term there, from March 4, 1815, until March 3, 1817. While he was in Congress, it was proposed that the compensation given U.S. Representatives be increased $6 a day to $1,500 a year. Clayton supported the change, but it became very controversial, and his support of it caused him to lose the nomination of the Federalist Party to Louis McLane, beginning a long rivalry between the two men.

Clayton narrowly failed in an attempt to return to the U.S. House of Representatives in the 1818 election but was returned to the Delaware Senate again in 1821. Then, when Caesar Augustus Rodney resigned as U.S. Senator from Delaware, the General Assembly elected him to serve out the term, from January 8, 1824, to March 3, 1827. Clayton thus became one of the last men affiliated with the Federalist Party to be elected to the United States Senate. This was the time when the First Party System of Federalists and Jeffersonian Republicans was giving way to the Jacksonian Democrats, and those opposed to Jackson. Clayton, his family, and much of the old Federalist following in Delaware aligned themselves with John Quincy Adams and the National Republicans who would later become Whigs.

After his term in the U.S. Senate ended, Clayton was appointed Chief Justice of the Delaware Court of Common Pleas in 1828. This court ceased to exist with the new Delaware Constitution of 1831, and Clayton was appointed Chief Justice of the new Delaware Superior Court in 1832. In 1833, Chief Justice Clayton became one of the initial trustees of Newark College in Newark, Delaware, which would later become the University of Delaware.

In 1837, Clayton's cousin, U.S. Senator John M. Clayton, resigned his office. Thomas Clayton was once again elected to the U.S. Senate to finish the term. After it ended, he was reelected in 1841 and served from January 9, 1837, to March 3, 1847. During this second period of service in the Senate, Clayton was at various times the Chairman of the Committee on Printing and a member of the Committee of Revolutionary Claims.

== Death and legacy ==
Clayton died of pneumonia at his retirement home at New Castle and is buried in the Old Presbyterian Cemetery, which is at Dover, on the grounds of the Delaware State Museum.

"A handsome man with polished manners, he was a stickler for dignity, decorum and punctuality at court session, and once ordered himself fined $10 for being 10 minutes late in appearing in court."

Thomas Scharf comments: "Chief Justice Clayton was profoundly versed in the principles of the law. He had a marvelous skill in perceiving the vital points of a case, largely due to his almost intuitive grasp of fundamental principles. He was prompt in deciding the merits of an issue and felicitous in the precision with which he formulated facts and conclusions. His words were few but masterly in force and point. Judge Clayton was eminently impartial in his judicial capacity. Neither distinction of the person nor relationships swayed his judgments. With respect to the lawyers at the Bar, he made no difference in the administration of rules between the eminent John M. Clayton and his own son who was a practitioner at the same bar. He meted out to all the same even-handed justice, and required of all the same respectful regard for the law and for decorum."

== Almanac ==
Elections were held on the first Tuesday of October. Members of the General Assembly took office on the first Tuesday of January. State Senators had a three-year term and State Representatives had a one-year term. The Secretary of State and Attorney General were appointed by the Governor and took office on the third Tuesday of January for a five-year term. U.S. Representatives took office on March 4 and have a two-year term.

The General Assembly chose the U.S. Senators, who also took office on March 4, but for a six-year term. In this case, he was initially completing the existing term, the vacancy caused by the resignation of Caesar Augustus Rodney. However, the General Assembly failed to fill the position for nearly a year.

Public offices
Office	Type	Location	Began office	Ended office	Notes
State Representative	Legislature	Dover	January 4, 1803	January 3, 1804	
State Representative	Legislature	Dover	January 3, 1804	January 1, 1805	
State Representative	Legislature	Dover	January 1, 1805	January 7, 1806	
State Representative	Legislature	Dover	January 7, 1806	January 6, 1807	
State Representative	Legislature	Dover	January 6, 1807	January 5, 1808	
State Senator	Legislature	Dover	January 5, 1808	January 19, 1808	resigned
Secretary of State	Executive	Dover	January 19, 1808	January 16, 1810	Delaware
Attorney General	Executive	Dover	January 16, 1810	January 17, 1815	Delaware
State Representative	Legislature	Dover	January 1, 1811	January 7, 1812	
State Representative	Legislature	Dover	January 5, 1813	January 4, 1814	
State Representative	Legislature	Dover	January 4, 1814	January 3, 1815	
U.S. Representative	Legislature	Washington	March 4, 1815	March 3, 1817	
State Senator	Legislature	Dover	January 3, 1821	January 6, 1824	
U.S. Senator	Legislature	Washington	January 8, 1824	March 3, 1827	
Chief Justice	Judiciary	Dover	February 8, 1828	January 18, 1832	Court of Common Pleas
Chief Justice	Judiciary	Dover	January 18, 1832	January 9, 1837	Superior Court
U.S. Senator	Legislature	Washington	January 9, 1837	March 3, 1841	
U.S. Senator	Legislature	Washington	March 4, 1841	March 3, 1847	

Delaware General Assembly service
Dates	Congress	Chamber	Majority	Governor	Committees	Class/District
1803	27th	State House	Federalist	David Hall		Kent at-large
1804	28th	State House	Federalist	David Hall		Kent at-large
1805	29th	State House	Federalist	Nathaniel Mitchell		Kent at-large
1806	30th	State House	Federalist	Nathaniel Mitchell		Kent at-large
1807	31st	State House	Federalist	Nathaniel Mitchell		Kent at-large
1808	32nd	State Senate	Federalist	George Truitt		Kent at-large
1811	35th	State House	Federalist	Joseph Haslet		Kent at-large
1813	37th	State House	Federalist	Joseph Haslet		Kent at-large
1814	38th	State House	Federalist	Daniel Rodney		Kent at-large
1821	45th	State Senate	Federalist	John Collins		Kent at-large
1822	46th	State Senate	Federalist	John Collins; Caleb Rodney		Kent at-large
1823	47th	State Senate	Republican	Joseph Haslet; Charles Thomas		Kent at-large

United States congressional service
Dates	Congress	Chamber	Majority	President	Committees	Class/District
1815–1817	14th	U.S. House	Republican	James Madison		1st at-large
1823–1825	18th	U.S. Senate	Republican	James Monroe		class 1
1825–1827	19th	U.S. Senate	National Republican	John Quincy Adams		class 1
1835–1837	24th	U.S. Senate	Democratic	Andrew Jackson		class 2
1837–1839	25th	U.S. Senate	Democratic	Martin Van Buren		class 2
1839–1841	26th	U.S. Senate	Democratic	Martin Van Buren		class 2
1841–1843	27th	U.S. Senate	Whig	William Henry Harrison; John Tyler	Printing	class 2
1843–1845	28th	U.S. Senate	Whig	John Tyler		class 2
1845–1847	29th	U.S. Senate	Democratic	James K. Polk	Revolutionary Claims	class 2

Election results
Year	Office	Subject	Party	Votes	%	Opponent	Party	Votes	%
1814	U.S. Representative	Thomas Clayton; Thomas Cooper	Federalist	3,964; 3,960	30% 30%	Willard Hall; George Read Jr.	Republican	2,547; 2,545	20% 20%
1818	U.S. Representative	Thomas Clayton; Louis McLane	Federalist	2,902; 3,098	25% 26%	Willard Hall; George Read Jr.	Republican	3,007; 2,818	25% 24%

== Notes ==
Legal offices
Preceded by Outerbridge Horsey	Attorney General of Delaware; 1810–1815	Succeeded by James Rogers
U.S. House of Representatives
Preceded by Henry M. Ridgely	Member of the U.S. House of Representatives from Delaware's at-large congressional district 1815–1817	Succeeded by Louis McLane
U.S. Senate
Preceded by Caesar Augustus Rodney	U.S. senator from Delaware; 1824–1827	Succeeded by Louis McLane
Preceded by John M. Clayton	U.S. senator from Delaware; 1837–1847	Succeeded by Presley Spruance
