= Governor Rodney =

Governor Rodney may refer to:

- Caesar Rodney (1728–1784), President of Delaware
- Caleb Rodney (1767–1840), 23rd Governor of Delaware
- Daniel Rodney (1764–1846), 19th Governor of Delaware
