= 1813 Delaware gubernatorial election =

- October 5, 1813
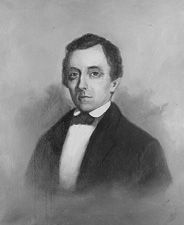

| Nominee | Daniel Rodney | James Riddle |
| Party | Federalist | Democratic-Republican |
| Popular vote | 4,643 | 3,768 |
| Percentage | 55.19% | 44.79% |
- Rodney: 60–70% Riddle: 60–70%
Governor before election
Joseph Haslet
Democratic-Republican
Elected Governor
Daniel Rodney
Federalist

The 1813 Delaware gubernatorial election was held on October 5, 1813. The Federalist former judge of the Delaware Court of Common Pleas Daniel Rodney defeated the Democratic-Republican New Castle county commissioner James Riddle.

== General election ==
=== Results ===
1813 Delaware gubernatorial election
| Party | Candidate | Votes | % | ±% |
|---|---|---|---|---|
| Federalist | Daniel Rodney | 4,643 | 55.19 | ▲5.68 |
| Democratic-Republican | James Riddle | 3,768 | 44.79 | ▼5.70 |
| Democratic-Republican | Francis Haughey | 1 | 0.01 | |
| Democratic-Republican | Richard C. Dale | 1 | 0.01 | |
| Total votes | | 8,413 | 100.00 | |
| Federalist gain from Democratic-Republican | | | | |

=== Results by county ===
1813 Delaware gubernatorial election by county
| County | Daniel Rodney Federalist | | James Riddle Democratic-Republican | | Others | | Margin | | Total |
| County | # | % | # | % | # | % | # | % | Total |
|---|---|---|---|---|---|---|---|---|---|
| Kent | 1,407 | 65.5 | 742 | 34.5 | — | | 665 | 31.0 | 2,149 |
| New Castle | 1,128 | 35.7 | 2,033 | 64.3 | 2 | 0.1 | -905 | -28.6 | 3,163 |
| Sussex | 2,108 | 68.0 | 993 | 32.0 | — | | 1,115 | 36.0 | 3,101 |
| TOTAL | 4,643 | 55.2 | 3,768 | 44.8 | 2 | 0.0 | 875 | 10.4 | 8,413 |

== Bibliography ==
- Dubin, Michael J. (2003). United States Gubernatorial Elections, 1776-1860: The Official Results by State and County. Jefferson, NC: McFarland and Company. ISBN 978-0-7864-1439-0.
- Lampi, Philip J. (2012). "Delaware 1813 Governor". A New Nation Votes. American Antiquarian Society.
