= Senator Rodney =

Senator Rodney may refer to:

== Members of the United States Senate ==
- Caesar Augustus Rodney (1772–1824), U.S. Senator from Delaware from 1822 to 1823, also serving in the Delaware State Senate
- Daniel Rodney (1764–1846), U.S. Senator from Delaware from 1826 to 1827

== United States state senate members ==
- Caesar Rodney (1728–1784), Delaware State Senate
- Caleb Rodney (1767–1840), Delaware State Senate
