= 1822 Delaware gubernatorial special election =

- October 1, 1822

Nominee	Joseph Haslet	James Booth
Party	Democratic-Republican	Federalist
Popular vote	3,784	3,762
Percentage	50.15%	49.85%
- Haslet: 50–60% 60–70% Booth: 60–70%
Governor before election
Caleb Rodney
Federalist
Elected Governor
Joseph Haslet
Democratic-Republican

The 1822 Delaware gubernatorial special election was held on October 1, 1822. A little more than a year into his three-year term, Democratic-Republican Governor John Collins died in office, elevating State Senate Speaker Caleb Rodney, a Federalist, to the governorship and triggering a special election for a three-year term in 1822. Former Governor Joseph Haslet ran as the Democratic-Republican nominee against James Booth, the Federalist nominee. Haslet won a narrow victory over Booth, receiving just 22 more votes than his opponent. However, for the third time in four years, a vacancy occurred; Haslet died on June 20, 1823, and State Senate Speaker Charles Thomas became Governor until the 1823 special election.

== General election ==
=== Results ===
1822 Delaware gubernatorial special election
Party	Candidate	Votes	%	±%
Democratic-Republican	Joseph Haslet	3,784	50.15%	−2.86%
Federalist	James Booth	3,762	49.85%	+2.86%
Majority		22	0.29%	−5.72%
Turnout		7,546	100.00%	
Democratic-Republican gain from Federalist				

== Bibliography ==
- Gubernatorial Elections, 1787-1997. Washington, D.C.: Congressional Quarterly Inc. 1998. ISBN 1-56802-396-0.
- Glashan, Roy R. (1979). American Governors and Gubernatorial Elections, 1775-1978. Meckler Books. ISBN 0-930466-17-9.
- Dubin, Michael J. (2003). United States Gubernatorial Elections, 1776-1860: The Official Results by State and County. Jefferson, North Carolina: McFarland. ISBN 978-0-7864-1439-0.
