= 1816 Delaware gubernatorial election =

- October 1, 1816
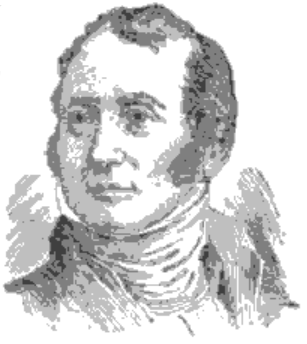

| Nominee | John Clark | Manaen Bull |
| Party | Federalist | Democratic-Republican |
| Popular vote | 4,008 | 3,517 |
| Percentage | 53.24% | 46.72% |
- Clark: 60–70% Bull: 60–70%
Governor before election
Daniel Rodney
Federalist
Elected Governor
John Clark
Federalist

The 1816 Delaware gubernatorial election was held on October 1, 1816. The Federalist former representative from New Castle County John Clark defeated the Democratic-Republican candidate Manaen Bull.

== General election ==
=== Results ===
1816 Delaware gubernatorial election
| Party | Candidate | Votes | % | ±% |
|---|---|---|---|---|
| Federalist | John Clark | 4,008 | 53.24 | ▼1.95 |
| Democratic-Republican | Manaen Bull | 3,517 | 46.72 | ▲1.93 |
| | John Clay | 1 | 0.01 | |
| Federalist | Thomas Clayton | 1 | 0.01 | |
| Federalist | Thomas Janvier | 1 | 0.01 | |
| Total votes | | 7,528 | 100.00 | |
| Federalist hold | | | | |

=== Results by county ===
1816 Delaware gubernatorial election by county
| County | John Clark Federalist | | Manaen Bull Democratic-Republican | | Others | | Margin | | Total |
| County | # | % | # | % | # | % | # | % | Total |
|---|---|---|---|---|---|---|---|---|---|
| Kent | 1,219 | 60.3 | 802 | 39.7 | — | | 417 | 20.6 | 2,021 |
| New Castle | 1,090 | 38.9 | 1,706 | 61.0 | 3 | 0.1 | -616 | -22.1 | 2,799 |
| Sussex | 1,699 | 62.7 | 1,009 | 37.3 | — | | 690 | 25.4 | 2,708 |
| TOTAL | 4,008 | 53.2 | 3,517 | 46.7 | 3 | 0.0 | 491 | 6.5 | 7,528 |

== Bibliography ==
- Dubin, Michael J. (2003). United States Gubernatorial Elections, 1776-1860: The Official Results by State and County. Jefferson, NC: McFarland and Company. ISBN 978-0-7864-1439-0.
- Lampi, Philip J. (2012). "Delaware 1816 Governor". A New Nation Votes. American Antiquarian Society.
