= 1810 Delaware gubernatorial election =

- October 2, 1810

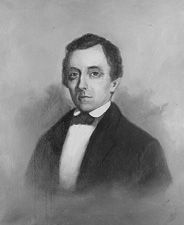
Nominee	Joseph Haslet	Daniel Rodney
Party	Democratic-Republican	Federalist
Popular vote	3,664	3,593
Percentage	50.49%	49.51%
- Haslet: 60–70% Rodney: 50–60% 60–70%
Governor before election
George Truitt
Federalist
Elected Governor
Joseph Haslet
Democratic-Republican

The 1810 Delaware gubernatorial election was held on October 2, 1810. The Democratic-Republican candidate Joseph Haslet defeated the Federalist former judge of the Delaware Court of Common Pleas Daniel Rodney.

== General election ==
=== Results ===
1810 Delaware gubernatorial election
Party	Candidate	Votes	%	±%
Democratic-Republican	Joseph Haslet	3,664	50.49	▲2.44
Federalist	Daniel Rodney	3,593	49.51	▼2.42
Total votes		7,257	100.00	
Democratic-Republican gain from Federalist				

=== Results by county ===
1810 Delaware gubernatorial election by county
County	Joseph Haslet Democratic-Republican		Daniel Rodney Federalist		Margin		Total
County	#	%	#	%	#	%	Total
Kent	1,049	46.2	1,221	53.8	-172	-7.6	2,270
New Castle	1,584	68.5	727	31.5	857	37.0	2,311
Sussex	1,031	39.7	1,645	60.3	-614	-20.6	2,676
TOTAL	3,664	50.5	3,593	49.5	71	1.0	7,257

== Bibliography ==
- Dubin, Michael J. (2003). United States Gubernatorial Elections, 1776-1860: The Official Results by State and County. Jefferson, NC: McFarland and Company. ISBN 978-0-7864-1439-0.
- Lampi, Philip J. (2012). "Delaware 1810 Governor". A New Nation Votes. American Antiquarian Society.
