= 1807 Delaware gubernatorial election =

- October 6, 1807
Nominee	George Truitt	Joseph Haslet
Party	Federalist	Democratic-Republican
Popular vote	3,309	3,062
Percentage	51.93%	48.05%
- Truitt: 50–60% 60–70% Haslet: 60–70%
Governor before election
Nathaniel Mitchell
Federalist
Elected Governor
George Truitt
Federalist

The 1807 Delaware gubernatorial election was held on October 6, 1807. The Federalist senator from Kent County George Truitt defeated the Democratic-Republican candidate Joseph Haslet.

== General election ==
=== Results ===
1807 Delaware gubernatorial election
Party	Candidate	Votes	%	±%
Federalist	George Truitt	3,309	51.93	▼0.08
Democratic-Republican	Joseph Haslet	3,062	48.05	▲0.08
Democratic-Republican	Richard C. Dale	1	0.01	
Total votes		6,372	100.00	
Federalist hold				

=== Results by county ===
1807 Delaware gubernatorial election by county
County	George Truitt Federalist		Joseph Haslet Democratic-Republican		Richard C. Dale Democratic-Republican		Margin		Total
County	#	%	#	%	#	%	#	%	Total
Kent	1,088	53.3	952	46.7	—		136	6.6	2,040
New Castle	580	31.7	1,249	68.2	1	0.0	-669	-36.5	1,830
Sussex	1,641	65.6	861	34.4	—		780	31.2	2,502
TOTAL	3,309	51.9	3,062	48.0	1	0.0	247	3.9	6,372

== Bibliography ==
- Dubin, Michael J. (2003). United States Gubernatorial Elections, 1776-1860: The Official Results by State and County. Jefferson, NC: McFarland and Company. ISBN 978-0-7864-1439-0.
- Lampi, Philip J. (2012). "Delaware 1807 Governor". A New Nation Votes. American Antiquarian Society.
