= The Hermitage (New Castle, Delaware) =

Destroyed historic house in Delaware, US

- U.S. National Register of Historic Places
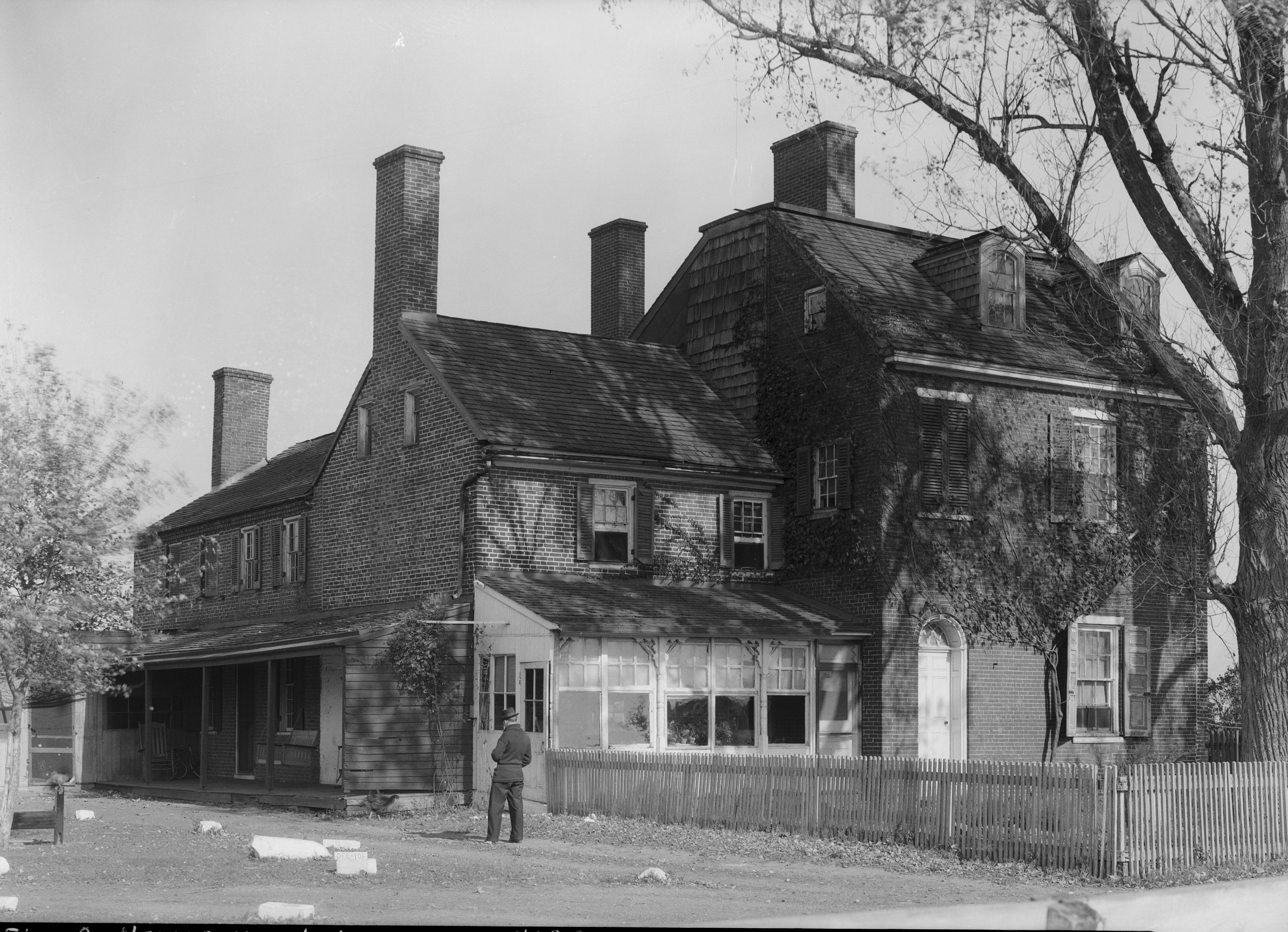
- The Hermitage, HABS Photo, October 1936

- Location within Delaware Location within the United States
- Location: 901 Delaware Street, New Castle, Delaware
- Coordinates: 39.665232°N 75.569263°W
- Area: 1 acre (0.40 ha)
- Built: c. 1700-1818
- NRHP reference No.: 73000522
- Added to NRHP: March 1, 1973

The Hermitage was a historic home located at New Castle, Delaware, United States. It was built between about 1700 and 1818, and consisted of three brick sections. The oldest section was the 2 1/2-story west wing. There was a two-story, rear kitchen wing, with servant's quarters above. The main section was built in 1818, and was a two-story, three-bay structure. It was built by U.S. Senator Nicholas Van Dyke (1770–1826) as a farm and summer retreat for his family.

The house was added to the National Register of Historic Places in 1973.

The Hermitage was heavily damaged by fire between 5:00 p.m. and 10:00 p.m. on February 18, 2007, in an act of arson. Following the fire, the two oldest sections of the house were completely destroyed, with only the walls left standing. The newer section (circa 1810) of the house was relatively intact, including a marble fireplace in the front, and a carved and gesso mantle and woodwork in the rear. Declared a safety hazard by the city of New Castle, the remains of the Hermitage were torn down in 2009. Nothing was salvaged.
