= John Andrews (priest) =

Clergyman, professor, author, provost (1746–1813)

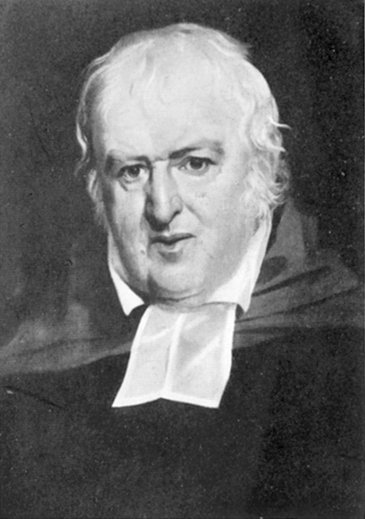
Andrews, c. 1810

John Andrews (4 April 1746 – 29 March 1813) was an American Episcopal priest; 4th provost of the University of Pennsylvania (1810–1813), 3rd vice provost (1789–1810), and professor of moral philosophy (1789–1813) of the same college; principal of the Episcopal Academy of Philadelphia (1785–1789); rector of St. Thomas Church in Garrison Forest, Baltimore County, Maryland (1782–1784); founder of the bases of York College of Pennsylvania (1776); minister of St. Peter's Episcopal Church (Lewes, Delaware) (1767–1770); lecturer; and author of published textbooks and sermons.

== Early life and family ==
=== Early life ===
John Andrews, D.D., A.B., MA, first son of Moses and Letitia Cooke Andrews, was born in Cecil County on the Eastern Shore of Maryland, about six miles from the head of the Elk River (Maryland), on 4 April 1746, His childhood home was a 75-acre tract of land called "Lesson" (patented to his father 10 March 1746) in Cecil County, Maryland.

=== Ancestry ===
He was great, grandson of John Andrews who immigrated in 1654 from Bisbrooke, Rutland, England, to Anne Arundel County or Calvert County in a Puritan settlement called "Providence" (Eastport side of Annapolis) Province of Maryland under the patronage of Lord Cecil Calvert, 2nd Baron Baltimore. His great-great-grandfather was Edward Andrews who was Sheriff of Rutland in 1637, whose father Anthony Andrews was sheriff of the same in 1613.

=== Immediate family ===
In 1772, Andrews married Elizabeth Callender, daughter of Captain Robert Callender of Carlisle, Pennsylvania. They had ten children, Robert (2), John (5), Letitia, Mary, Joseph, Elizabeth Callender, William Neill, George, Edward (5), and Mary Benger. The eldest, Robert, graduated from the academy and College of Philadelphia in 1790. Mrs. Andrews death on 22 February 1798, was occasioned by the death of shock she encountered by a sudden death of a son caused by a fire.

== Education ==
When he was seven years old, Andrews's father enrolled him in the Newcastle Presbytery's Head of Elk School in Head of Elk, Maryland. Andrews received an A.B. with distinguished honor from The academy and College of Philadelphia in 1764. He later taught grammar school in Philadelphia. In 1767, he received an M.A. from the College of Philadelphia (later merged into University of the State of Pennsylvania to create University of Pennsylvania).

Andrews continued his connection with the Grammar School and then took charge of a classical school in Lancaster, Pennsylvania. Having previously resolved to devote himself to the ministry in the Episcopal Church, he studied theology under the Rev. Thomas Barton, Rector of St. James's Church in Lancaster, Pennsylvania. Andrews then sailed for London, England, where he was ordained a deacon in the Anglican Church. He was then appointed a missionary to Lewes, Delaware, by the Society for Propagating the Gospel in Foreign Parts.

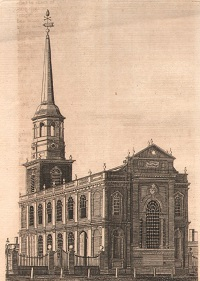
Christ Church, Philadelphia (1811) by William Strickland.

== Career ==
Rev. John Andrews ministered at St. Peter's Episcopal Church (Lewes, Delaware) from 1767 through 1770. He then transferred to York, Pennsylvania, where assumed missionary jurisdiction at St. John's Church in York, York County and St. John's Church in Carlisle, Pennsylvania, in Cumberland County. Sometime in 1775 he took charge of St. John's Church in Queen Anne's County, Maryland. As the American Revolutionary War progressed, Andrews grew conflicted: his political sympathies lay with the Americans, but he believed the oath of allegiance to England he took as part of his Holy Orders took precedence. He recused himself from public exercise of his profession and returned to York.

In 1776, during this period in York, Andrews founded the academy that evolved under several changes to become known as today the York College of Pennsylvania. In 1787 it was incorporated as York County Academy and brought under the jurisdiction of St. John's Episcopal Church.

After the Revolution, Andrews resumed his clerical duties. On 13 April 1782 he returned to Maryland to become rector of St. Thomas Church in Garrison Forest, Baltimore County, Maryland, a position he held until 1784. That same year he was a member of the convention that organized the separation of the American Episcopal Church from the Anglican Church. He later advocated for union with the Methodist Church.

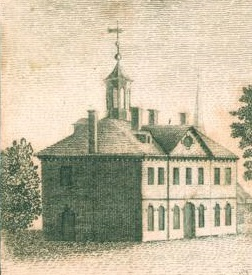
Episcopal Academy in Philadelphia, Circa 1790

In 1785, Washington College in Chestertown, Maryland, awarded Andrews an honorary Doctor of Divinity. That same year, when Episcopal Academy was founded in Philadelphia, the academy's trustees unanimously elected Andrews as headmaster. He served in this position until 1789, when he became Professor of Moral Philosophy at the University of Pennsylvania. At Penn he lectured admiringly on the Constitution of the United States. Of the said college, John Andrews became Vice-Provost 1789–1810 and Provost from 1810 until his death from sudden illness on 29 March 1813. Until his death he also served as Rector of St. James Church in Bristol, Pennsylvania, and assistant minister of Christ Church in Philadelphia. Rev. John Andrews is considered one of America's first scholars for he dedicated his career as a student, tutor, professor, lecturer, author, founder and administrator of schools and colleges.

He was elected on into the American Philosophical Society in 1787.

John Andrews is interred at the historic Christ Church Burial Ground in Philadelphia.

== Writings ==
=== Textbooks ===
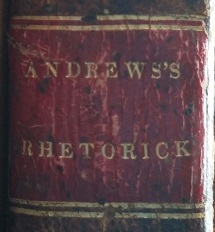
Elements of Rhetorick and Belles Lettres

- A Compend of Logick (1801)
- Metamorphoseon (1805)
- Elements of Logic (second edition 1807)
- Elements of Rhetorick and Belles Lettres (1813).

=== Published sermons ===
- A Sermon on the Importance of Mutual Kindness (1789).
- A Sermon on the Parable of the Unjust Steward (1789).

=== Addresses ===
- An Address to Graduates in Medicine, Delivered at Commencement of University of Pennsylvania in 1791
