= Nicholas Van Dyke (politician, born 1769) =

American politician (1769–1826)

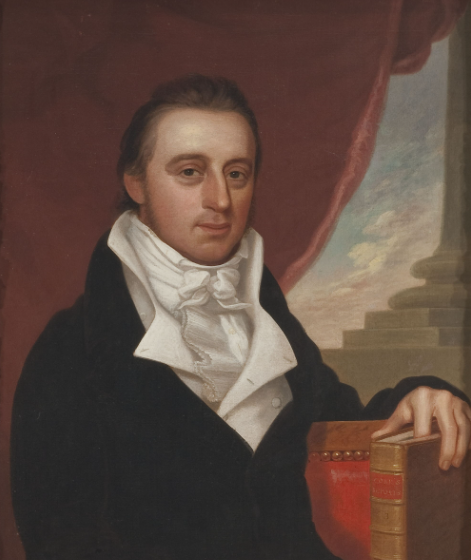

United States Senator from Delaware
- In office March 4, 1817 – May 21, 1826
- Preceded by: William H. Wells
- Succeeded by: Daniel Rodney

Member of the U.S. House of Representatives from Delaware's at-large district
- In office October 6, 1807 – March 3, 1811
- Preceded by: James M. Broom
- Succeeded by: Henry M. Ridgely

3rd Attorney General of Delaware
- In office 1801–1806
- Governor: James Sykes; David Hall; Nathaniel Mitchell
- Preceded by: Nicholas Ridgely
- Succeeded by: Outerbridge Horsey

Member of the Delaware House of Representatives
- In office January 1, 1799 – January 7, 1800

Personal details
- Born: December 20, 1769 New Castle, Delaware Colony
- Died: May 21, 1826 (aged 56) New Castle, Delaware, U.S.
- Party: Federalist Party
- Spouse: Mary Ann Leuvaneigh
- Education: College of New Jersey
- Profession: Lawyer

Nicholas Van Dyke (December 20, 1769 – May 21, 1826) was an American lawyer and politician from New Castle, Delaware. He was a member of the Federalist Party, who served in the Delaware General Assembly, as attorney general of Delaware, as U.S. representative from Delaware, and as U.S. senator from Delaware.

== Early life and education ==
Van Dyke was born in New Castle, Delaware, son of Nicholas and Elizabeth (Nixon) Van Dyke. His mother died two weeks after giving birth to Nicholas. His father, who had been a member of the Continental Congress and a President of Delaware, later married again, to Charlotte Stanley.

The younger Nicholas graduated from the College of New Jersey, now Princeton University, in 1788, studied law with his brother-in-law, Kensey Johns, and was admitted to the Delaware Bar in New Castle, in 1792.

== Career ==
Van Dyke was a Federalist who was a member of the Delaware House of Representatives in 1799. From 1801 until 1806 he served as Attorney General of Delaware.

In 1807 he was elected to the 10th United States Congress to fill the vacancy caused by the resignation of U.S. Representative James M. Broom. He was reelected to the 11th Congress, and served in the U.S. House from October 6, 1807, until March 3, 1811. With the Federalists a powerless minority in Congress, he returned home to serve as the Attorney General of Delaware.

He was elected to the Delaware State Senate for the 1816 and 1817 sessions. While serving there, he was elected to the United States Senate, where he served from March 4, 1817, until his death on May 21, 1826. He missed the first month and a half of the 18th U.S. Congress, as his first term in the Senate expired on March 3, 1823, and he was not re-elected by the Delaware Legislature until January 7, 1824. He did not take his seat in the Senate for the 18th Congress until January 14, 1824, while the Senate had convened on December 1, 1823. He was Chairman of the Committee on Pensions in the 16th U.S. Congress.

== Personal life ==
He married Mary Ann Leuvaneigh in 1792. They had six children, including Nicholas III, Kensey Johns, and Dorcas Montgomery and lived at many houses in and around New Castle, Delaware. One of these was at the corner of Delaware and Fourth Streets and was the location of the 1824 wedding of Dorcas Van Dyke and Charles I. du Pont, which was attended by the Marquis de Lafayette.

His farm and summer retreat, The Hermitage, was added to the National Register of Historic Places in 1973. The family were members of Immanuel Episcopal Church.

== Death and legacy ==
Van Dyke died in New Castle, Delaware, and is buried there in the cemetery at Immanuel Episcopal Church on the Green. A fellow lawyer who knew Van Dyke compared him to other lawyers by saying that he was a "sound lawyer and superior to them all as a fluent, graceful and successful advocate and in the skillful management of his cases."

== Almanac ==
Elections were held the first Tuesday of October and members of the General Assembly took office on the first Tuesday of January. The State Senate had a term of three years and the State House had a term of one year. U.S. Representatives took office March 4 and had a two-year term. The General Assembly chose the U.S. senators who also took office March 4, but for a six-year term.

Public offices
Office	Type	Location	Began office	Ended office	Notes
State Representative	Legislature	Dover	January 1, 1799	January 7, 1800	
Attorney General	Executive	Dover	1801	1806	Delaware
U.S. Representative	Legislature	Washington	October 6, 1807	March 3, 1809	(Note: Elected to fill the vacancy caused by the resignation of James M. Broom, seated December 2, 1807.)
U.S. Representative	Legislature	Washington	March 4, 1809	March 3, 1811	
State senator	Legislature	Dover	January 6, 1816	March 3, 1817	
U.S. senator	Legislature	Washington	March 4, 1817	March 3, 1823	
U.S. senator	Legislature	Washington	March 4, 1823	May 21, 1826	

Delaware General Assembly service
Dates	Assembly	Chamber	Majority	Governor	Committees	District
1799	23rd	State House	Federalist	Richard Bassett		New Castle at-large

United States congressional service
Dates	Congress	Chamber	Majority	President	Committees	Class/District
1807–1809	10th	U.S. House	Republican	Thomas Jefferson		at-large
1809–1811	11th	U.S. House	Republican	James Madison		at-large
1817–1819	15th	U.S. Senate	Republican	James Monroe		class 2
1819–1821	16th	U.S. Senate	Republican	James Monroe		class 2
1821–1823	17th	U.S. Senate	Republican	James Monroe		class 2
1823–1825	18th	U.S. Senate	Republican	James Monroe		class 2
1825–1827	19th	U.S. Senate	Democratic	John Quincy Adams		class 2

Election results
Year	Office	Subject	Party	Votes	%	Opponent	Party	Votes	%	Notes
1807	U.S. Representative	Nicholas Van Dyke	Federalist	3,294	52%	John Dickinson	Republican	3,078	48%	(Note: Special election August 6, 1807, to fill the vacancy caused by the resignation of James M. Broom.)
1808	U.S. Representative	Nicholas Van Dyke	Federalist	3,242	53%	Joseph Haslet	Republican	2,837	47%	

== See also ==
- List of members of the United States Congress who died in office (1790–1899)

== Notes ==
Legal offices
Preceded by Nicholas Ridgely	Attorney General of Delaware; 1801–1806	Succeeded by Outerbridge Horsey
U.S. House of Representatives
Preceded by James M. Broom	Member of the U.S. House of Representatives from Delaware's at-large congressional district October 6, 1807 – March 3, 1811	Succeeded by Henry M. Ridgely
U.S. Senate
Preceded by William H. Wells	U.S. senator from Delaware; March 4, 1817 – May 21, 1826	Succeeded by Daniel Rodney
