= Trial court =

Type of court where trials take place

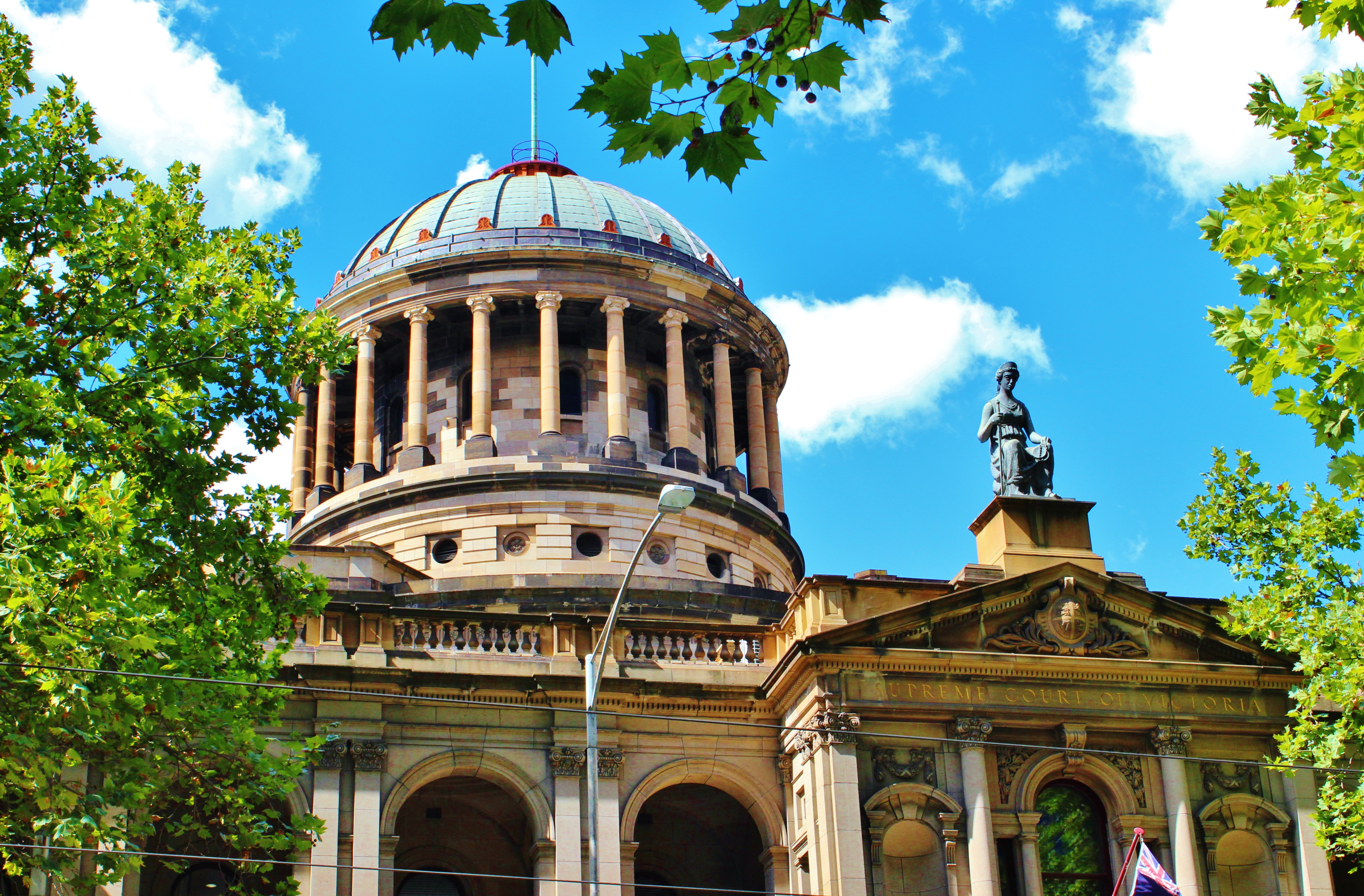
The Supreme Court of Victoria, Australia, an example of a trial court

A trial court or court of first instance is a court having original jurisdiction, in which trials take place. Appeals from the decisions of trial courts are usually heard by higher courts with the power of appellate review (appellate courts). Most appellate courts do not have the authority to hear testimony or take evidence, but instead rule solely on matters of law.

In the trial court, evidence and testimony are admitted under the rules of evidence established by applicable procedural law and determinations called findings of fact are made based on the evidence. The court, presided over by one or more judges, makes findings of law based upon the applicable law. In most common law jurisdictions, the trial court often sits with a jury and one judge; in such jury trials, the jury acts as trier of fact. In some cases, the judge or judges act as triers of both fact and law, by either statute, custom, or agreement of the parties; this is referred to as a bench trial.

== In the United States ==
In the United States, a trial court of general jurisdiction is authorized to hear some type of civil or criminal case that is not committed exclusively to another court. The United States district courts are the trial courts of general jurisdiction of the federal judiciary; each state has a system establishing trial courts of general jurisdiction, such as the circuit courts in Florida, the superior courts in California, and the New York Supreme Court in New York state. Most trial courts are courts of record, where the record of the presentation of evidence is created and must be maintained or transmitted to the appellate court. The record of the trial court is certified by the clerk of the trial court and transmitted to the appellate body.

Not all cases are heard in trial courts of general jurisdiction. A trial court of limited jurisdiction is authorized to hear only specified types of cases. Trial courts of limited jurisdiction may be limited in subject-matter jurisdiction (such as juvenile, probate, and family courts in many U.S. states, or the United States Tax Court in the federal judiciary) or by other means, such as small claims courts in many states for civil cases with a low amount in controversy. Other trials do not take place in courts at all, but in quasi-judicial bodies or in administrative agencies with adjudicatory power created by statute to make binding determinations with simplified procedural practices, such as arbitration. The United States Supreme Court is primarily an appellate court, but has original jurisdiction in cases involving a diplomatic official or a state.

Because different U.S. states apply different names to their courts, it is often not evident whether a court has general or limited jurisdiction or indeed is a trial court at all. For instance, the Maine District Court is a court of limited jurisdiction, but the Nevada District Courts are courts of general jurisdiction. Likewise, the Delaware Court of Common Pleas is a court of limited jurisdiction, but the Pennsylvania Courts of Common Pleas are courts of general jurisdiction. Similarly, the California Superior Courts are trial courts of general jurisdiction, but the Superior Court of Pennsylvania is an appellate court, and the New Jersey Superior Court is both.

== See also ==
- Lower court
- Appellate court
- Supreme court
