= Gov. George Truitt House =

Historic house in Delaware, United States

- U.S. National Register of Historic Places
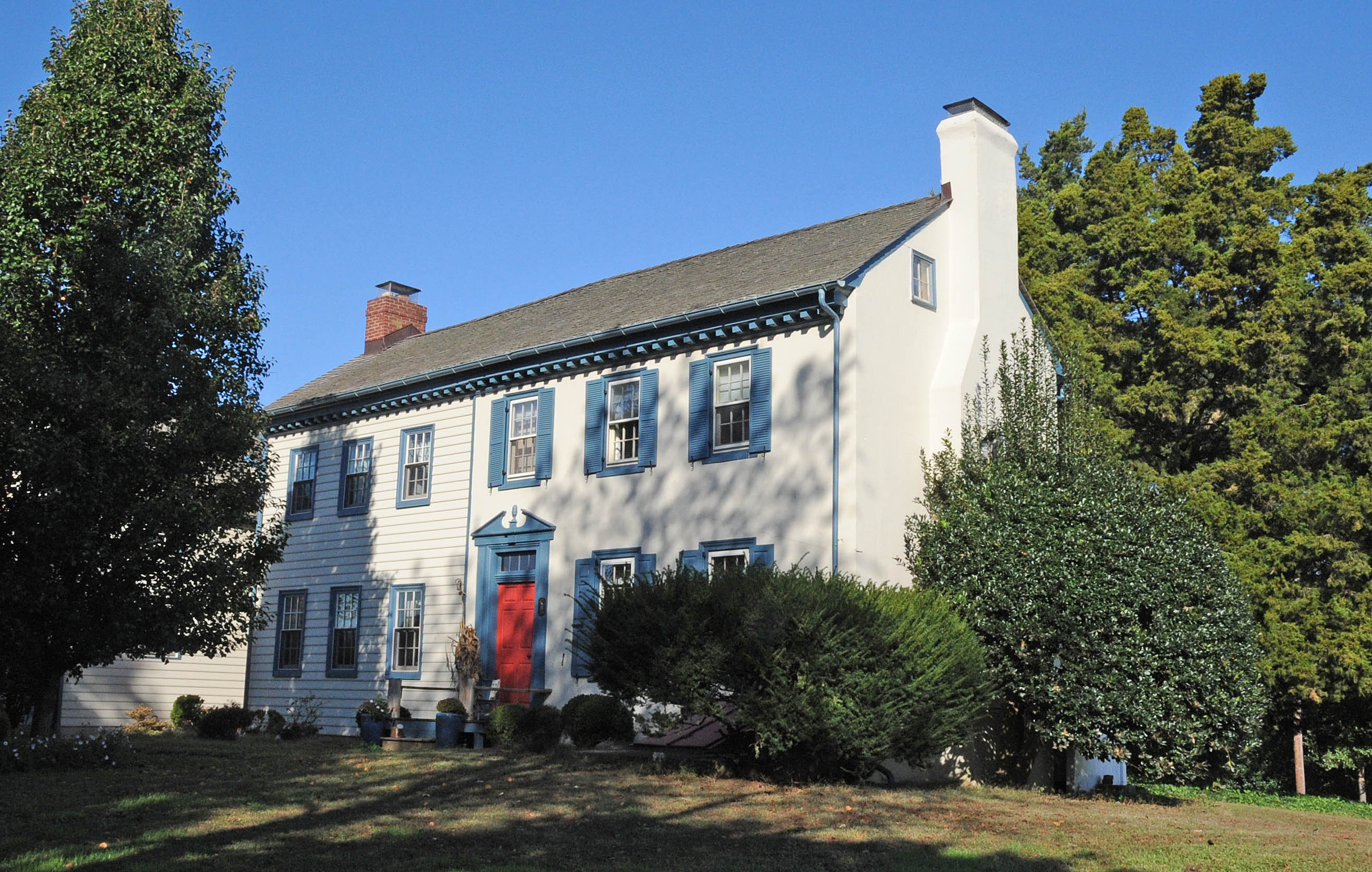

- Location within Delaware Location within the United States
- Location: Southwest of Magnolia on Road 388, Magnolia, Delaware
- Coordinates: 39°1′10″N 75°32′18″W
- Area: 2 acres (0.81 ha)
- Built: 1796
- Architectural style: Georgian
- NRHP reference No.: 78000889
- Added to NRHP: December 12, 1978

Gov. George Truitt House is a historic home located near Magnolia, Kent County, Delaware. It was built about 1796, and consists of a 2 1/2-story, stuccoed brick main house, with a 2 1/2-story braced frame wing. The house is in the late-Georgian style. It features a gable roof with an interesting modillioned box cornice and an exterior chimney with sloped weatherings and corbelled lip. It was the home of Delaware Governor George Truitt (1756–1818).

It was listed on the National Register of Historic Places in 1978.
