= Henry M. Ridgely =

American politician

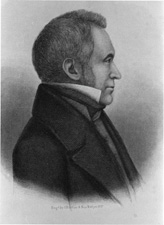

United States Senator from Delaware
- In office January 12, 1827 – March 3, 1829
- Preceded by: Daniel Rodney
- Succeeded by: John M. Clayton

Member of the U.S. House of Representatives from Delaware's 1st at-large district
- In office March 4, 1811 – March 3, 1815
- Preceded by: Nicholas Van Dyke
- Succeeded by: Thomas Clayton

Member of the Delaware House of Representatives
- In office 1808–1811; 1816–1828

Personal details
- Born: August 6, 1779 Dover, Delaware
- Died: August 6, 1847 (aged 68) Dover, Delaware, U.S.
- Party: Federalist Party, Jacksonian
- Spouse(s): Sally Banning; Sarah Ann Comegys
- Education: Dickinson College
- Profession: Lawyer

Henry Moore Ridgely (August 6, 1779 – August 6, 1847) was an American lawyer and politician from Dover, in Kent County, Delaware. He was a member of the Federalist Party, and later the Democratic Party, who served as U.S. Representative from Delaware and as U.S. Senator from Delaware.

== Early life and family ==
Ridgely was born in Dover, Delaware, the son of Dr. Charles and Ann Moore Ridgely. He attended Dickinson College and studied law with Charles Smith of Lancaster, Pennsylvania. Admitted to the Delaware Bar in 1802, he began a practice in Dover. Sally Banning of Dover was his first wife, and they had 15 children, including eight who lived to adulthood: Charles George, Elizabeth, Ann (who married Charles I. du Pont), Henry, Nicholas, Eugene, Williamina and Edward. In 1842, Ridgely married Sarah Ann Comegys, the daughter of Cornelius P. Comegys, the former Governor of Delaware. They had no children. They were all members of Christ Episcopal Church. Ridgely was instrumental in the organization of the Farmer's Bank and served as its president in Dover for 40 years.

== Professional and political career ==
Ridgely was a Federalist and began his political career in the State House, serving in three sessions from 1808 through 1810. He was a Kent County Levy Court Commissioner as well. Subsequently, he was elected to the 12th and 13th United States House from until March 4, 1811, until March 3, 1815. There he joined the general Federalist opposition to the War of 1812. Much of his correspondence from these days is published in A Calendar of Ridgely Family Letters, 1742–1899.

Not seeking reelection in 1814, he returned to Dover and resumed the practice of law. He served as the Secretary of State of Delaware from 1817 until 1827 and also was elected to the State House for the 1816, 1822, and 1827 sessions. In 1827, he was elected to the United States Senate to fill the vacancy caused by the death of Nicholas Van Dyke and served out his term from January 12, 1827, until March 3, 1829. He was not reelected to the next Congress because, in the great political realignment then underway, Ridgely had become a supporter of President Andrew Jackson, in opposition to the majority in the Delaware General Assembly. He was an opponent of slavery and is said to have bought slaves, only to release them.

== Death and legacy ==
Ridgely died at Dover on August 6, 1847, his 68th birthday, and is buried there in the Christ Episcopal Church Cemetery. He was considered a man of superior judgment with a considerable talent for business.

== Almanac ==
Elections were held the first Tuesday of October. Members of the State House took office on the first Tuesday of January for a one-year term. U.S. Representatives took office March 4 and have a two-year term. The General Assembly chose the U.S. Senators, who also took office March 4, but for a six-year term.

Public offices
Office	Type	Location	Began office	Ended office	Notes
State Representative	Legislature	Dover	January 1, 1808	January 7, 1809	
State Representative	Legislature	Dover	January 1, 1809	January 7, 1810	
State Representative	Legislature	Dover	January 1, 1810	January 7, 1811	
U.S. Representative	Legislature	Washington	March 4, 1811	March 3, 1813	
U.S. Representative	Legislature	Washington	March 4, 1813	March 3, 1815	
Secretary of State	Executive	Dover	1817	1827	
State Representative	Legislature	Dover	January 1, 1816	January 7, 1817	
State Representative	Legislature	Dover	January 1, 1822	January 7, 1823	
State Representative	Legislature	Dover	January 1, 1827	January 7, 1828	
U.S. Senator	Legislature	Washington	January 12, 1827	March 3, 1829	

Delaware General Assembly service
Dates	Assembly	Chamber	Majority	Governor	Committees	District
1808	32nd	State House	Federalist	George Truitt		Kent at-large
1809	33rd	State House	Federalist	George Truitt		Kent at-large
1810	34th	State House	Federalist	George Truitt		Kent at-large
1816	40th	State House	Federalist	Daniel Rodney		Kent at-large
1822	46th	State House	Federalist	John Collins		Kent at-large
1827	51st	State House	Federalist	Charles Polk Jr.		Kent at-large

United States congressional service
Dates	Congress	Chamber	Majority	President	Committees	Class/District
1811–1813	12th	U.S. House	Republican	James Madison		at-large
1813–1815	13th	U.S. House	Republican	James Madison		1st at-large
1825–1827	19th	U.S. Senate	Democratic	John Quincy Adams		class 2
1827–1829	20th	U.S. Senate	Democratic	John Quincy Adams		class 2

Election results
Year	Office	Subject	Party	Votes	%	Opponent	Party	Votes	%
1810	U.S. Representative	Henry M. Ridgely	Federalist	3,634	50%	Richard C. Dale	Republican	6,229	51%
1812	U.S. Representative	Henry M. Ridgely; Thomas Cooper	Federalist	4,193; 4,182	29% 29%	David Hall; Richard C. Dale	Republican	3,221; 3,210	22% 22%

U.S. House of Representatives
Preceded by Nicholas Van Dyke	Member of the U.S. House of Representatives from Delaware's at-large congressional district 1811–1815	Succeeded by Thomas Clayton
U.S. Senate
Preceded by Daniel Rodney	U.S. Senator from Delaware; 1827–1829	Succeeded by John M. Clayton
