= Jacob Stout =

American politician

21st Governor of Delaware
- In office January 18, 1820 – January 16, 1821
- Preceded by: Henry Molleston (elect)
- Succeeded by: John Collins

Member of the Delaware Senate
- In office January 2, 1816 – January 18, 1820

Member of the Delaware House of Representatives
- In office January 5, 1813 – January 3, 1815

Personal details
- Born: 1764 Kent County, Delaware Colony
- Died: November 28, 1855 (aged 90–91) Kent County, Delaware
- Party: Federalist
- Spouse: Angelica Killen
- Occupation: Manufacturer

Jacob Stout (1764 – November 28, 1855) was an American manufacturer and politician from Little Creek Hundred, in Kent County, Delaware. He was a member of the Federalist Party, who served in the Delaware General Assembly and as Governor of Delaware.

== Early life and family ==
Stout was born in Little Creek Hundred, Kent County, Delaware, the son of Jacob Emanuel Stout and his second wife Mary Griffin Stout. His ancestors came to Kent County from New Jersey in the 17th century. Like many in the area, his father was a reluctant revolutionary in 1776, but later served six years in the Delaware General Assembly. Jacob Stout married Angelica Killen in 1795 and had four children, Mary, William, Henry, Sarah Ann, and William Jacob. The exact location of their home is debated. Some say it was north of Leipsic and others say it was west of it, on the Cheswold Road. It was nearby in any case, as he was one of the founders of Leipsic. He was also president of the Smyrna Bank from 1844 until 1847. They were members of the Presbyterian Church.

Stout had a tannery in Dover and one day while bending over to check the contents of one of the tanning vats, a pet ram seized the opportunity and butted him into the vat. Supposedly Stout then commented on the impudence of the ... ram to butt the Governor of Delaware into a tanning vat.

== Professional and political career ==
Stout served in the state house for two sessions in 1813 and 1814. He was then elected to the state senate for two terms, beginning with the 1815 session and ending with the 1820 session, when he was elected Speaker. This was done in full knowledge that he would immediately become governor, as the person recently elected to become governor, Henry Molleston, had died before taking office. As part of the arrangement it was agreed that Stout would serve but one year and a special gubernatorial election would be held in 1820 for a two-year term. He served as Governor of Delaware from January 18, 1820, until January 16, 1821.

During his term in office the issue of the extension of slavery into U.S. territories became a national crisis. Typically, Delaware was divided on the matter. Stout and the General Assembly supported national action preventing slavery's extension, but most of Delaware's congressional delegation disagreed. The Missouri Compromise of 1820 was the final result. In 1822 Stout was named a Judge of the Court of Common Pleas.

Delaware General Assembly (sessions while Governor)
| Year | Assembly | Senate majority | Speaker | House majority | Speaker |
|---|---|---|---|---|---|
| 1820 | 44th | Federalist | vacant | Federalist | Nathan Vickers |

== Death and legacy ==
Stout died at his home in Little Creek Hundred, Kent County. At first he was buried at his home, but later was moved and is now buried in the Old Presbyterian Cemetery, which is at Dover, on the grounds of the Delaware State Museum.

During the course of his long life he was involved in much activity. In addition to his political career and tannery, he was active in land reclamation and development projects, helped to lay out the road from Bombay Hook Lighthouse to Smyrna and was one of the founders of the town of Leipsic.

== Almanac ==
Elections were held the first Tuesday of October. Members of the Delaware General Assembly took office the first Tuesday of January. State senators had a three-year term and state representatives had a one-year term. The governor takes office the third Tuesday of January and had a three-year term.

Public offices
| Office | Type | Location | Began office | Ended office | Notes |
|---|---|---|---|---|---|
| State Representative | Legislature | Dover | January 5, 1813 | January 4, 1814 | |
| State Representative | Legislature | Dover | January 4, 1814 | January 3, 1815 | |
| State Senator | Legislature | Dover | January 2, 1816 | January 5, 1819 | |
| State Senator | Legislature | Dover | January 5, 1819 | January 18, 1820 | |
| Governor | Executive | Dover | January 18, 1820 | January 16, 1821 | acting |

Delaware General Assembly service
| Dates | Assembly | Chamber | Majority | Governor | Committees | District |
|---|---|---|---|---|---|---|
| 1813 | 37th | State House | Federalist | Joseph Haslet | | Kent at-large |
| 1814 | 38th | State House | Federalist | Daniel Rodney | | Kent at-large |
| 1816 | 40th | State Senate | Federalist | Daniel Rodney | | Kent at-large |
| 1817 | 41st | State Senate | Federalist | John Clark | | Kent at-large |
| 1818 | 42nd | State Senate | Federalist | John Clark | | Kent at-large |
| 1819 | 43rd | State Senate | Federalist | John Clark | | Kent at-large |
| 1820 | 44th | State Senate | Federalist | Henry Molleston | Speaker | Kent at-large |

== Bibliography ==
- Conrad, Henry C. (1908). History of the State of Delaware. Lancaster, Pennsylvania: Wickersham Company.
- Hale, Thomas (1915). The Stout Family of Delaware Streets.
- Martin, Roger A. (1984). A History of Delaware Through its Governors. Wilmington, Delaware: McClafferty Press.
- Martin, Roger A. (1995). Memoirs of the Senate. Newark, Delaware: Roger A. Martin.
- Scharf, John Thomas (1888). History of Delaware 1609-1888. 2 vols. Philadelphia: L. J. Richards & Co. ISBN 0-87413-493-5.

== Places with more information ==
- Delaware Historical Society; website; 505 North Market Street, Wilmington, Delaware 19801; (302) 655-7161
- University of Delaware; Library website; 181 South College Avenue, Newark, Delaware 19717; (302) 831-2965

Political offices
| Preceded by Henry Molleston; Elect | Governor of Delaware; 1820–1821 | Succeeded by John Collins |
