= Nicholas Ridgely (born 1762) =

- Born: September 30, 1762
- Died: April 1, 1830 (aged 67)
- Occupations: Lawyer, politician, judge
- Title: Attorney General of Delaware, Chancellor of Delaware

Nicholas Ridgely (September 30, 1762 – April 1, 1830) was a Delaware lawyer, politician, and judge who served as Attorney General of Delaware and as the second Chancellor of Delaware. He was a member of the Electoral College in the 1820 presidential election, voting for James Monroe.

== Early life, education, and career ==
Born in Dover, Delaware, Ridgely belonged to a family of public and social prominence which "for many successive generations in Delaware has furnished judges and lawyers of marked ability". He was the eldest son of John Charles Greensburg Ridgely and Mary Wynkoop Ridgeley, the father being an accomplished physician of Kent County, Delaware, who was himself the son of the earlier Judge Nicholas Ridgely and a descendant of Colonel Henry Ridgley.

Ridgeley read law under Judge Robert Goldsborough at Cambridge, Maryland, and was admitted to the Delaware bar at Newcastle in 1787. He quickly "attained a conspicuous standing at the bar even among such distinguished members as the elder James A. Bayard, Caesar Augustus Rodney, and Nicholas Van Dyke Jr." and "was repeatedly elected a member of the general assembly, and drafted the principal legislation required by the changes wrought" by the American Revolution and the recently adopted Constitution of the United States. In 1791, Ridgeley was appointed attorney general of Delaware and held that office for 10 years. He was leading member of the state constitutional convention of 1791–92,

== Chancellor of Delaware ==
In December 1801, Chancellor William Killen resigned his office, and Ridgely was appointed to succeed him on December 6, 1801. This development marked a substantial evolution of the office:

Prior to his appointment there had been very little business in the court of Chancery and there were few precedents for his guidance. The entire course of equity, procedure and practice was yet to be regulated and established under the newly created Court of Chancery. To this task, he devoted himself and his methodical way with untiring vigor and industry. The rules of court, forms of practice and general principles adopted by him [were, as of 1899] still in use, and he is justly considered the founder of the chancery Jurisprudence in Delaware. During the thirty years he was Chancellor, he carefully took notes and preserved his opinions in all of the important cases adjudicated by him.

In 1802, the orphans court jurisdiction was transferred from the court of common pleas to the chancellor by an amendment to the constitution of 1792, effected mainly by Ridgely's influence. He thereby became sole judge of the orphans court.

== Personal life and death ==
Although he lived until the 1830s he still adhered to the manners and garb of the olden times. Towards the close of his life, he suffered from ill health, although he sturdily discharged his judicial duties to the end. He died of heart disease at the age of 67, within a half hour after he had adjourned his court at Georgetown, and was buried in the Episcopal churchyard at Dover. In 1932, a commemorative plaque was installed at his burial site.

Political offices
Preceded by Gunning Bedford Jr.	Attorney General of Delaware; 1790–1801	Succeeded by Nicholas Van Dyke
Preceded by William Killen	Chancellor of Delaware; 1801–1830	Succeeded by Kensey Johns Sr.
