= Charles Thomas (Delaware politician) =

American politician (1790–1848)

25th Governor of Delaware
- In office June 24, 1823 – January 20, 1824
- Preceded by: Joseph Haslet
- Succeeded by: Samuel Paynter

Member of the Delaware Senate
- In office January 2, 1822 – June 24, 1823

Member of the Delaware House of Representatives
- In office January 6, 1818 – January 5, 1819

Personal details
- Born: June 23, 1790 New Castle County, Delaware
- Died: February 8, 1848 (aged 57) New Castle, Delaware
- Party: Democratic-Republican
- Spouse: Eliza Stoops
- Education: Princeton College
- Profession: lawyer

Charles Thomas (June 23, 1790 – February 8, 1848) was an American lawyer and politician from New Castle, in New Castle County, Delaware. He was a member of the Democratic-Republican Party, who served in the Delaware General Assembly and as Governor of Delaware.

== Early life and family ==
Thomas was born at Dragon Neck in Red Lion Hundred, New Castle County, Delaware, son of Charles & Susanna McCallmont Thomas. His father was an elder of the New Castle Presbyterian Church and president of the New Castle Turnpike Company. Charles Jr. married Eliza Stoops and they had one child, Eliza. They lived at the "Thomas House" at the corner of Harmony Street and the Strand, now the Parish House of Immanuel Episcopal Church. They were members of New Castle Presbyterian Church.

There are no known records showing the fate of Thomas' wife, Eliza. What is known is that his daughter Eliza was cared for by Dr. John Rumsey of Wilmington until she was about 10 years old, and then moved in with Thomas' sister Sally, who was married to William T. Read, his college roommate, and grandson of George Read, the Signer. William and Sally resided at the Thomas House, and donated it to the Episcopal Church.

== Professional and political career ==
Thomas attended Princeton College and studied law with George Read Jr. He was admitted to the Delaware bar in 1813 and began the practice of law at New Castle. He served in the 1818 session of the state house, and the 1822 and 1823 session of the state senate. Since he was the Speaker in the 1823 session, he succeeded to the office of governor upon the death of Governor Joseph Haslet. He then served as Governor of Delaware from June 24, 1823, until January 20, 1824.

Thomas continued the advocacy of several other governors on behalf of improved public education. As told by Carol Hoffecker in Democracy in Delaware, "'In these portentous times,' remarked Governor Thomas in 1824, 'it seems rather a hazardous experiment to permit one generation to sleep in ignorance.' He advocated a special school tax, which he promised 'would be a blessing to the people...for it would...relieve them of the most intolerable of all burdens, the burdens of immorality and ignorance. 'In vain,' he said, 'do we boast of our elective franchise, and our civil rights, if a large portion of our citizens are unable to read the tickets which they annually present at the polls. Such men may think themselves free, but in fact they are slaves.... If education is confined to the rich,' he warned, 'the few will govern.'" By refusing to raise taxes or surrender local control, the General Assembly again failed to act.

Thomas was also an advocate for penal reform. Again from Hoffecker, Thomas "noted without pride that 'the penal laws of this State are much severer than those of any State in the Union." Arguing against imprisonment for debt, he said "An opinion seems to pervade the community that our poor houses...are rather nurseries for vice than asylums for the helpless." For now, this request received no response.

Delaware General Assembly (sessions while Governor)
Year	Assembly	Senate Majority	Speaker	House Majority	Speaker
1823	47th	Republican	vacant	Republican	George Clark Jr.

== Death and legacy ==
Thomas died at New Castle and is buried there at the Presbyterian Cemetery. There is no known portrait of Charles Thomas.

== Almanac ==
Elections were held the first Tuesday of October. Members of the Delaware General Assembly took office the first Tuesday of January. State senators had a three-year term and state representatives had a one-year term. The governor takes office the third Tuesday of January and had a three-year term.

Public Offices
Office	Type	Location	Began office	Ended office	notes
State Representative	Legislature	Dover	January 6, 1818	January 5, 1819	
State Senator	Legislature	Dover	January 1, 1822	June 24, 1823	Speaker
Governor	Executive	Dover	June 24, 1823	January 20, 1824	Acting

Delaware General Assembly service
Dates	Assembly	Chamber	Majority	Governor	Committees	District
1818	42nd	State House	Federalist	John Clark		New Castle at-large
1822	46th	State Senate	Federalist	John Collins		New Castle at-large
1823	47th	State Senate	Federalist	Joseph Haslet		New Castle at-large

== Places with more information ==
- Delaware Historical Society; website; 505 North Market Street, Wilmington, Delaware 19801; (302) 655-7161
- University of Delaware; Library website; 181 South College Avenue, Newark, Delaware 19717; (302) 831-2965

Political offices
Preceded by Joseph Haslet	Governor of Delaware; 1823–1824	Succeeded by Samuel Paynter
