= Henry Molleston =

American politician (1762–1819)

Governor-elect of Delaware
- Died before assuming office
- Preceded by: John Clark
- Succeeded by: Jacob Stout

Personal details
- Born: January 1, 1762 Mispillion Hundred, Delaware Colony, British America
- Died: November 11, 1819 (aged 57) Dover, Delaware, U.S.
- Party: Federalist
- Spouse: Molly Combe
- Occupation: Physician, miller

Henry Molleston III (January 1, 1762 – November 11, 1819) was an American medical doctor and politician from Dover, in Kent County, Delaware. He was a member of the Federalist Party, who served in the Delaware General Assembly, and was elected Governor of Delaware, but died before taking office.

== Early life and family ==
Molleston was born in Mispillion Hundred, Kent County, Delaware, near Thompsonville. He was the son of Henry and Sarah Manlove Molleston. His ancestor, Alexander Mollestine, was probably Dutch, and was an early settler of Lewes. His grandfather, Henry, was a member of the Colonial Assembly in 1687. Henry III was the brother of Jemima Ann, the wife of Colonel John Haslet, and uncle of Dr. William G. Molleston, surgeon in the Delaware Regiment and member of the State House. He married Mary (Molly) Combe in 1793 and they had three known children: Elizabeth, Jemima Ann, and a son. They were members of the Methodist Church.

== Professional and political career ==
Molleston was a physician, but was also a miller and was known to have had two mills on Isaac's Branch of the St. Jones River. He was also a Trustee of Union Academy in Camden. In 1800 it is believed he lived at "Passey" or "Cooper's Corner", where State Street crosses U.S. Highway 13.

Molleston was a member of the convention that wrote and approved the Delaware Constitution of 1792. In 1799 he was elected to the State House and served from the 1800 session through the 1808 session. After serving as state treasurer from 1808 until 1813, he was elected again to the State House for the 1814 session and then to the state senate, where he served from the 1815 session through the 1819 session. He was Speaker of the State Senate from the 1817 session through the 1819 session.

In 1819, he was elected Governor of Delaware by defeating Manaen Bull of Laurel, the Democratic-Republican candidate, but died shortly after the election and before taking office. His death precipitated something of a political crisis, as this situation was not anticipated in the constitution. The agreed-upon solution was for the newly elected State Senate to elect a Speaker, Jacob Stout, and for the incumbent governor, John Clark, to resign before the end of his term, so the newly elected Speaker could succeed to the office. It was also agreed that Stout would serve only one year as governor before a special election was held.

== Death and legacy ==
Molleston died at his home in Dover. His burial location is unknown, but possibilities include the property where his home was located, the old Whatcoat Cemetery at Camden, or the old Banning Chapel Cemetery on the Dover-Magnolia Road. No known portrait of Henry Molleston exists.

== Almanac ==
Elections were held the first Tuesday of October. Members of the Delaware General Assembly took office the first Tuesday of January. State senators had a three-year term and state representatives had a one-year term. The governor took office the third Tuesday of January and had a three-year term.

Public offices
Office	Type	Location	Began office	Ended office	Notes
Delegate	Convention	Dover	November 1792	June 12, 1792	State Constitution
State Representative	Legislature	Dover	January 7, 1800	January 6, 1801	
State Representative	Legislature	Dover	January 6, 1801	January 5, 1802	
State Representative	Legislature	Dover	January 5, 1802	January 4, 1803	
State Representative	Legislature	Dover	January 4, 1803	January 3, 1804	
State Representative	Legislature	Dover	January 3, 1804	January 1, 1805	
State Representative	Legislature	Dover	January 1, 1805	January 7, 1806	
State Representative	Legislature	Dover	January 7, 1806	January 6, 1807	
State Representative	Legislature	Dover	January 6, 1807	January 5, 1808	
State Representative	Legislature	Dover	January 5, 1808	February 1808	
State Treasurer	Executive	Dover	February 1808	1813	
State Representative	Legislature	Dover	January 4, 1814	January 3, 1815	
State Senator	Legislature	Dover	January 3, 1815	January 6, 1818	
State Senator	Legislature	Dover	January 6, 1818	November 11, 1819	

Delaware General Assembly service
Dates	Assembly	Chamber	Majority	Governor	Committees	District
1800	24th	State House	Federalist	Richard Bassett		Kent at-large
1801	25th	State House	Federalist	Richard Bassett		Kent at-large
1802	26th	State House	Federalist	David Hall		Kent at-large
1803	27th	State House	Federalist	David Hall		Kent at-large
1804	28th	State House	Federalist	David Hall		Kent at-large
1805	29th	State House	Federalist	Nathaniel Mitchell		Kent at-large
1806	30th	State House	Federalist	Nathaniel Mitchell		Kent at-large
1807	31st	State House	Federalist	Nathaniel Mitchell		Kent at-large
1808	32nd	State House	Federalist	George Truitt		Kent at-large
1814	38th	State House	Federalist	Daniel Rodney		Kent at-large
1815	39th	State Senate	Federalist	Daniel Rodney		Kent at-large
1816	40th	State Senate	Federalist	Daniel Rodney		Kent at-large
1817	41st	State Senate	Federalist	John Clark	Speaker	Kent at-large
1818	42nd	State Senate	Federalist	John Clark	Speaker	Kent at-large
1819	43rd	State Senate	Federalist	John Clark	Speaker	Kent at-large

Election results
Year	Office	Subject	Party	Votes	%	Opponent	Party	Votes	%
1819	Governor	Henry Molleston	Federalist	3,823	55%	Manaen Bull	Democratic-Republican	3,185	45%

Party political offices
Preceded by John Clark	Federalist nominee for Governor of Delaware; 1819	Succeeded by Jesse Green
Political offices
Preceded by John Clark	Governor-elect of Delaware; 1819	Succeeded by Jacob Stout
