= St. Peter's Episcopal Church (Lewes, Delaware) =

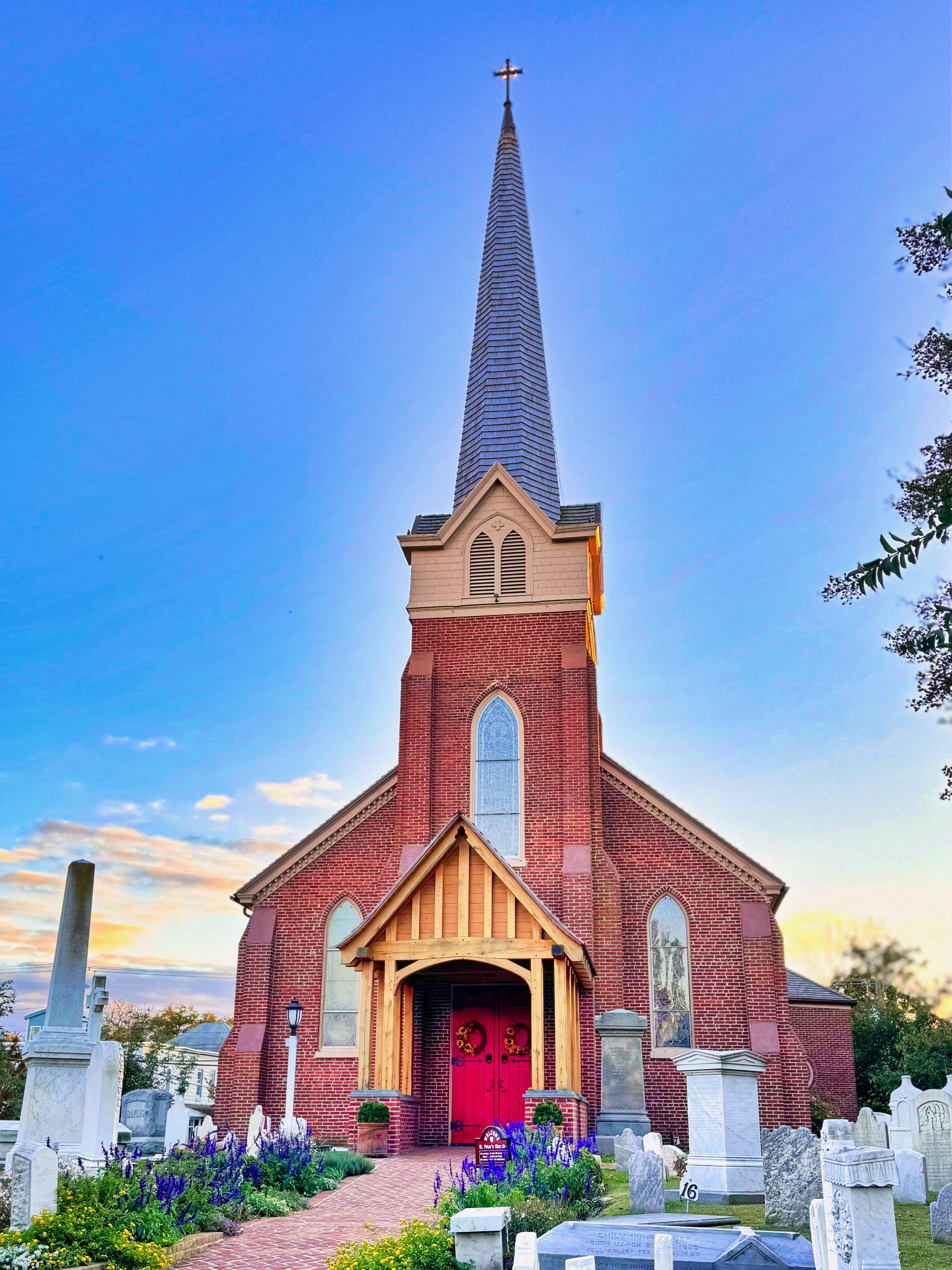
St. Peter's Episcopal Church in Lewes, Delaware

St. Peter's Episcopal Church is a parish of the Episcopal Church in Lewes, Delaware. It was founded in 1708, becoming the ninth church of its denomination established in Delaware with the help of the Society for the Propagation of the Gospel in Foreign Parts.

In 2019, the church reported 717 members; in 2023, it reported 482 members. No membership statistics were reported in 2024 national parochial reports. Average Sunday Attendance (ASA) reported by the church in 2024 was 254 persons. This was a relative decrease from ASA of 338 persons reported in 2017.

== History ==
Members of the Church of England settled in the area from around 1680, meeting in homes and later the courthouse. They petitioned the Bishop of London to send clergy to serve them and other churches in Sussex County; the first missionary arrived in 1708, but stayed for only a year. A permanent Sussex Mission was established by the Rev. William Becket, who came to Lewes in September 1721 and remained until his death in 1743. Through his work, St. Peter's and three other churches flourished in Sussex County. He is buried in St. Peter's churchyard.

It is not known exactly when the first church was built, although it was sufficiently finished to hold services when Becket arrived in 1721. In a letter of October 1728 to the Bishop of London, Becket describes St. Peter's Church as follows:

[It is] 40 feet in length 24 broad, the wall between the plate and the sill is 15 feet. The frame... Wood. the Roof... covered with Cypress Shingles and the wall with Boards of the same wood,.. the walls wainscoted with Cypress plank as high as the tops of the pews. The Pulpit, reading desk, Communion Table and Rail are handsomely built of Black Walnut — the pews... of pine plank... the number of people frequenting this church I reckon... about 150.

The original communion table is still in use as the altar in the present church. The church also has the original Book of Common Prayer used by the first congregation. In 1773 the church was presented a silver communion service made by John David, Silversmith of Philadelphia. It consists of four pieces, a flagon with domed cover for wine 10" high, chalice with removable cover 12" high, and a paten 10" in diameter. Each piece is inscribed "The Gift of the Honorable John Penn Esq. To St. Peter’s Church in Lewis Town June 10, 1773." The service is still used for communion on special occasions. John Marshall Phillips, Curator at Yale University, wrote that the Chippendale Period communion service was "outstanding" and "the finest silver in Delaware." The silver has been exhibited at the Metropolitan Museum in New York, Christie's in London, and in other museum exhibits.

Clergy for the church were supplied by the SPG until the American Revolution. St. Peter's survived the split with the Church of England, becoming part of the Protestant Episcopal Church in the United States in 1785. John Andrews, after being ordained Deacon of the Anglican Church in 1767, was appointed by the USPS as missionary of said church in which he honored for three years.

A new church was constructed in 1808, about 30 or 40 feet to the south and west of the old church. On 15 September 1808, the Rev. James Wiltbank preached a sermon to the congregation in the completed building, which sat on the site of the present building. In 1848 it was decided to replace this building as well, as it was "much decayed and badly constructed for a house of worship." In 1853 the old church was moved to the southwest corner of the churchyard on Third Street. Plans were purchased from a Philadelphia architect and on 27 May 1854, the Right Reverend Alfred Lee, Bishop of Delaware laid the cornerstone of the present building. The vestry asked Bishop Lee to consecrate the church in 1858, but the church was probably finished long before this, for Episcopal churches can only be consecrated when all debts have been paid.

The steeple was added in 1870, and a sacristy and other rooms were added to the rear of the church in 1903.
