= John Clark (Delaware politician) =

American politician (1761–1821)

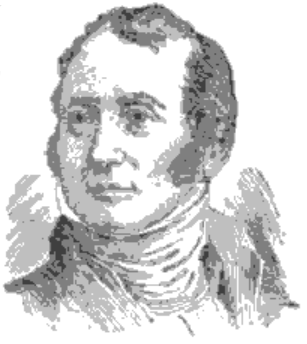

20th Governor of Delaware
- In office January 21, 1817 – January 18, 1820
- Preceded by: Daniel Rodney
- Succeeded by: Henry Molleston (elect)

Member of the Delaware House of Representatives
- In office January 2, 1799 – January 7, 1800

Personal details
- Born: February 1, 1761 New Castle County, Delaware Colony
- Died: August 14, 1821 (aged 60) New Castle County, Delaware
- Party: Federalist
- Spouse: Sarah Cook Corbit
- Occupation: Farmer

John Clark (February 1, 1761 – August 14, 1821) was an American politician from Blackbird Hundred in New Castle County, Delaware, near Smyrna. He was a member of the Federalist Party, who served in the Delaware General Assembly and as Governor of Delaware.

== Early life and family ==
Clark was born at "New Bristol" in what is now Blackbird Hundred, New Castle County, just north of Smyrna, son of William Clark. In 1784 he married Sarah Cook Corbit, daughter of Governor John Cook, and had a least one child, Mary. They lived at Clearfield Farm in what is now Blackbird Hundred in a house since used as an administrative office for the correctional facility located there. He was a member of the Presbyterian Church.

== Political career ==
Clark was unusual politically in that he was a Federalist and a Presbyterian from New Castle County. The more typical Federalist was an Episcopalian or Methodist and from Kent or Sussex County. The more typical Democratic-Republican was a Presbyterian from New Castle County. Nevertheless, in 1816 he defeated the Federalist candidate, Manaen Bull of Laurel in Sussex County and served as Governor of Delaware from January 21, 1817, until January 18, 1820.

As governor he was one of a succession advocating improvements in public education. Carol Hoffecker in Democracy in Delaware relates how he "argued that Delaware had a special need to educate its people because the state lacked vacant land for an expanding population. Therefore, he said 'much reliance must be placed on the mental talents of our citizens for the support of our power and importance in the Union.'" The General Assembly responded by appropriating a laughable $1,000 to each county for this purpose.

Furthermore, Delaware was stagnating. Medieval sounding punishments, like nailing ears to a pillory post, continued to be meted out in the penal system. The soil was increasingly exhausted and, due to the resulting out migration, Delaware's population in 1820 was roughly the same as in 1810. An immediate, and permanent, consequence was that it lost its second seat in the U.S. House of Representatives.

Delaware General Assembly (sessions while Governor)
Year	Assembly	Senate majority	Speaker	House majority	Speaker
1817	41st	Federalist	Henry Molleston	Federalist	Nathan Vickers
1818	42nd	Federalist	Henry Molleston	Federalist	Nathan Vickers
1819	43rd	Federalist	Henry Molleston	Federalist	Nathan Vickers

== Death and legacy ==
Clark died at Smyrna and is buried in the Duck Creek Presbyterian Churchyard, now Holy Hill Cemetery, located south of Smyrna on Lake Como.

== Almanac ==
Elections were held the first Tuesday in October. Members of the Delaware General Assembly took office in the first Tuesday of January. State representatives had a term of one year. The governor takes office the third Tuesday in January, and had a three-year term.

Public offices
Office	Type	Location	Began office	Ended office	Notes
Sheriff	Judiciary	New Castle			New Castle County
State Treasurer	Executive	Dover	1794	1799	
State Representative	Legislature	Dover	January 2, 1799	January 7, 1800	
Governor	Executive	Dover	January 21, 1817	January 18, 1820	

Delaware General Assembly service
Dates	Assembly	Chamber	Majority	Governor	Committees	District
1799	23rd	State Senate	Federalist	Richard Bassett		New Castle at-large

Election results
Year	Office	Subject	Party	Votes	%	Opponent	Party	Votes	%
1816	Governor	John Clark	Federalist	4,008	53%	Manaen Bull	Democratic-Republican	3,517	47%

== Notes ==
Party political offices
Preceded by Daniel Rodney	Federalist nominee for Governor of Delaware; 1816	Succeeded by Henry Molleston
Political offices
Preceded by Daniel Rodney	Governor of Delaware; 1817–1820	Succeeded by Henry Molleston; Elect
