= Delaware Court of Common Pleas =

The Delaware Court of Common Pleas are state courts of the U.S. state of Delaware.

The Delaware Court of Common Pleas are trial courts and inferior courts of limited jurisdiction. It has criminal jurisdiction throughout the state over all misdemeanors, except certain drug offenses, and motor vehicle offenses (see traffic court). The Court of Common Pleas also holds preliminary hearings in felony cases,

In civil matters, Court of Common Pleas tries lawsuits in which the amount in controversy does not exceed $50,000 (small claims), petitions for name change, habitual offender hearings on the privilege of operating a motor vehicle, and administrative appeals from the Division of Motor Vehicles. The Court of Common Plea also has appellate jurisdiction of criminal matters from Alderman's Courts and criminal and civil matters from the Justice of the Peace Courts.

The Superior Court of Delaware is the court of general jurisdiction in Delaware. It has original jurisdiction in all felony cases and civil suits in which the amount in controversy exceeds $75,000. Appeals from the Court of Common Pleas generally go to the Superior Court.

The Court currently consists of nine judges sitting in Delaware's three counties: Five in New Castle County, two in Kent County, and two in Sussex County. The Court has three problem-solving court divisions: A Drug Diversion Program, a Community Dispute Resolution Program, and a Mental Health Court.
