= Caleb Rodney =

American politician (1767–1840)

23rd Governor of Delaware
- In office April 23, 1822 – January 21, 1823
- Preceded by: John Collins
- Succeeded by: Joseph Haslet

Member of the Delaware Senate
- In office January 7, 1806 – January 2, 1810; January 2, 1816 – April 23, 1822

Member of the Delaware House of Representatives
- In office January 5, 1802 – January 7, 1806; January 7, 1812 – January 4, 1814

Personal details
- Born: April 29, 1767 Lewes, Delaware Colony
- Died: April 29, 1840 (aged 73) Lewes, Delaware
- Party: Federalist
- Spouse: Elizabeth West
- Occupation: Merchant

Caleb Rodney (April 29, 1767 – April 29, 1840) was an American merchant and politician from Lewes, in Sussex County, Delaware. He was a member of the Federalist Party, who served in the Delaware General Assembly and as Governor of Delaware.

== Early life and family ==
Rodney was born in Lewes, Delaware, son of John and Ruth Hunn Rodney, brother of former Governor Daniel Rodney, and distantly related to Delaware President Caesar Rodney. He married Elizabeth West and had five children, Hannah, Hester, Penelope, Eliza, and Daniel. They were members of St. Peter's Episcopal Church in Lewes. He ran a store at the corner of 2nd and Market Streets there, the door to which was allegedly damaged in the British attack and is now on display at the Zwaanendael Museum in Lewes.

== Professional and political career ==
Rodney served in the state house for four sessions from 1802 through 1805, when he was elected to the state senate and served for four more sessions from 1806 through 1809. He was back in the state house for two sessions in 1812 and 1813, and then returned to the state senate for one session in 1816. In October 1816, he ran for the U.S. Congress, but lost the election. So, the following year he was returned to his old seat in the state senate and served for five sessions from 1818 through 1822. He was the Speaker in the last two sessions and, therefore, became governor upon the death of Governor John Collins. He then served as governor from April 23, 1822, until January 21, 1823.

Rodney was known as an opponent of slavery, expressing the desire that the institution could be ended through continued manumissions.

== Death and legacy ==
Rodney died at Lewes, Delaware, and is buried there, at St. Peter's Episcopal Church Cemetery. No known portrait of Caleb Rodney exists.

Delaware General Assembly (sessions while Governor)
Year	Assembly	Senate majority	Speaker	House majority	Speaker
1822	46th	Federalist	vacant	Federalist	Alrichs Ryland

== Almanac ==
Elections were held the first Tuesday of October. Members of the General Assembly took office the first Tuesday of January. State senators had a three-year term and state representatives had a one-year term. The governor takes office the third Tuesday of January and had a three-year term.

Public offices
Office	Type	Location	Began office	Ended office	notes
State Representative	Legislature	Dover	January 5, 1802	January 4, 1803	
State Representative	Legislature	Dover	January 4, 1803	January 3, 1804	
State Representative	Legislature	Dover	January 3, 1804	January 1, 1805	
State Representative	Legislature	Dover	January 1, 1805	January 7, 1806	
State Senator	Legislature	Dover	January 7, 1806	January 6, 1807	
State Senator	Legislature	Dover	January 6, 1807	January 2, 1810	
State Representative	Legislature	Dover	January 7, 1812	January 5, 1813	
State Representative	Legislature	Dover	January 5, 1813	January 4, 1814	
State Senator	Legislature	Dover	January 2, 1816	January 7, 1817	
State Senator	Legislature	Dover	January 6, 1818	January 4, 1820	
State Senator	Legislature	Dover	January 4, 1820	April 23, 1822	
Governor	Executive	Dover	April 23, 1822	January 21, 1823	acting

Delaware General Assembly service
Dates	Assembly	Chamber	Majority	Governor	Committees	District
1802	26th	State House	Federalist	David Hall		Sussex at-large
1803	27th	State House	Federalist	David Hall		Sussex at-large
1804	28th	State House	Federalist	David Hall		Sussex at-large
1805	29th	State House	Federalist	Nathaniel Mitchell		Sussex at-large
1806	30th	State Senate	Federalist	Nathaniel Mitchell		Sussex at-large
1807	31st	State Senate	Federalist	Nathaniel Mitchell		Sussex at-large
1808	32nd	State Senate	Federalist	George Truitt		Sussex at-large
1809	33rd	State Senate	Federalist	George Truitt		Sussex at-large
1812	36th	State House	Federalist	Joseph Haslet		Sussex at-large
1813	37th	State House	Federalist	Joseph Haslet		Sussex at-large
1816	40th	State Senate	Federalist	Daniel Rodney		Sussex at-large
1818	42nd	State Senate	Federalist	John Clark		Sussex at-large
1819	43rd	State Senate	Federalist	John Clark		Sussex at-large
1820	44th	State Senate	Federalist	Jacob Stout		Sussex at-large
1821	45th	State Senate	Federalist	John Collins	Speaker	Sussex at-large
1822	46th	State Senate	Federalist	John Collins	Speaker	Sussex at-large

Political offices
Preceded by John Collins	Governor of Delaware; 1822–1823	Succeeded by Joseph Haslet
