= John Collins (Delaware politician) =

American politician (1776–1822)

22nd Governor of Delaware
- In office January 16, 1821 – April 16, 1822
- Preceded by: Jacob Stout
- Succeeded by: Caleb Rodney

Personal details
- Born: March 1, 1776 Sussex County, Delaware Colony
- Died: April 16, 1822 (aged 46) Sussex County, Delaware, US
- Party: Democratic-Republican
- Spouse: Jane Hall
- Profession: Manufacturer

John Collins (March 1, 1776 – April 16, 1822) was an American manufacturer and politician from Delaware. He was a member of the Democratic-Republican Party and served as Governor of Delaware from 1821 until his death in 1822.

== Early life and family ==
He was born at Collins Mill Pond, in Nanticoke Hundred, Sussex County, Delaware, the son of Captain John and Sarah "Sally" Houston Collins. Captain John Collins had mined bog ore from his property and served twelve years in the Delaware General Assembly. The sister of the younger John, married future Governor David Hazzard. The younger John himself married Jane Hall, daughter of former Governor David Hall, and had six children, Theophilus, John, Joseph, Sarah, Catherine, and Martha. Their home was at the Collins Mill Pond in Nanticoke Hundred, where he continued the operation of a mill. It is believed they were members of the Methodist Church.

== Political career ==
Collins was elected governor in 1820 by defeating the Federalist candidate, a longtime member of the General Assembly, Jesse Green. He was governor from January 16, 1821 until his death on April 16, 1822. Collins was known for his interest in improving public education. It was during his term that a controversial transit duty began being assessed to support the beginning of a new college in Newark. He also appointed Willard Hall, the future "father of public education," as secretary of state. Both of these actions would achieve results in later years.

== Death and legacy ==
Collins died at Collins Mill Pond, in Nanticoke Hundred, Sussex County, Delaware at the age of 46. He is buried there on the family farm. No known portrait of John Collins exists.

== Almanac ==
Elections were held on the first Tuesday of October. The governor takes office the third Tuesday in January, and had a three-year term.

Delaware General Assembly (sessions while Governor)
Year	Assembly	Senate Majority	Speaker	House Majority	Speaker
1821	45th	Federalist	Caleb Rodney	Federalist	John Cummins
1822	46th	Federalist	Caleb Rodney	Federalist	Alrichs Ryland

Public Offices
Office	Type	Location	Began office	Ended office	notes
Governor	Executive	Dover	January 16, 1821	April 16, 1822	died in office

Election results
Year	Office	Subject	Party	Votes	%	Opponent	Party	Votes	%
1820	Governor	John Collins	Republican	3,970	53%	Jesse Green	Federalist	3,520	47%

== Places with more information ==
- Delaware Historical Society; website; 505 North Market Street, Wilmington, Delaware 19801; (302) 655-7161
- University of Delaware; Library website; 181 South College Avenue, Newark, Delaware 19717; (302) 831-2965

Party political offices
Preceded by Manaen Bull	Democratic-Republican nominee for Governor of Delaware; 1820	Succeeded by Joseph Haslet
Political offices
Preceded by Jacob Stout	Governor of Delaware; 1821–1822	Succeeded by Caleb Rodney
