= Daniel Rodney =

American politician

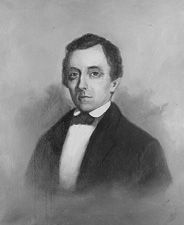

United States Senator from Delaware
- In office November 8, 1826 – January 12, 1827
- Appointed by: Samuel Paynter
- Preceded by: Nicholas Van Dyke
- Succeeded by: Henry M. Ridgely

United States Representative from Delaware
- In office October 1, 1822 – March 3, 1823
- Preceded by: Caesar A. Rodney
- Succeeded by: Seat eliminated

19th Governor of Delaware
- In office January 18, 1814 – January 21, 1817
- Preceded by: Joseph Haslet
- Succeeded by: John Clark

Personal details
- Born: September 10, 1764 Lewes, Delaware Colony
- Died: September 2, 1846 (aged 81) Lewes, Delaware, U.S.
- Party: Federalist
- Spouse: Sarah Fisher
- Occupation: Merchant

Daniel Rodney (September 10, 1764 – September 2, 1846) was an American merchant and politician from Lewes in Sussex County, Delaware. He was a member of the Federalist Party, and later the National Republican Party, who served as Governor of Delaware, U. S. Representative from Delaware and U.S. Senator from Delaware.

== Early life and family ==
Rodney was born at Lewes in the Delaware Colony, son of John and Ruth Hunn Rodney, brother of future Governor Caleb Rodney, and distantly related to Caesar Rodney. He married Sarah Fisher and they had eight children, Hannah, George, John, William, Henry, Nicholas, Susan, and Mary. They lived at 231 Second Street and were members of St. Peter's Episcopal Church in Lewes.

Rodney received little schooling, and worked as a sailor and merchant for some years. There is a story that before he was 21 years old he had his own ship and that during the American Revolution he was twice captured by the British. From 1793 to 1806, he served as a Judge in the Court of Common Pleas, during roughly the same time as Trustee of the Poor. He was also a trustee of Wilmington College.

== Professional and political career ==
His own political career began in 1810, when he ran for Governor of Delaware as a Federalist. He lost to the Democratic candidate, Joseph Haslet, by only 71 votes. His next campaign, in 1813, was against James Riddle of New Castle, and largely because of the unpopularity of the War of 1812, he was successful. He served as Governor of Delaware from January 18, 1814, to January 21, 1817.

The last year of the War of 1812 was as unnerving as the others had been. The British naval presence off the coast was more intermittent, but Indian River received a serious raid in June 1814. The burning of Washington, in August, however, really brought the war home. Everyone feared attacks up the coast. In Philadelphia old former President Thomas McKean was brought out of retirement to organize the defenses, and finally Pea Patch Island was actually fortified. The progress of the British army was halted at Baltimore and Delaware was not attacked again. Commodore Thomas Macdonough of Odessa was one of the heroes of 1814, defeating the British fleet on Lake Champlain, and U.S. Senator James A. Bayard Sr. of Wilmington was one of the commissioners to the peace conference that produced the Treaty of Ghent, which ended the war.

In the U.S. presidential election of 1820, Rodney received 4 electoral votes for Vice President, but lost overwhelmingly to incumbent Vice President Daniel D. Tompkins. This was the last virtually uncontested presidential election in U.S. history, with incumbent U.S. President James Monroe facing no opposition. The lack of contest documented the complete collapse of the Federalist Party everywhere except Delaware.

When Caesar A. Rodney resigned from the U.S. House of Representatives in 1822, Daniel Rodney was elected to replace him, serving in the U.S. House from October 1, 1822, to March 3, 1823. Several years later Daniel Rodney was appointed to the U.S. Senate to fill the vacancy caused by the death of Nicholas Van Dyke. He served briefly from November 8, 1826, to January 12, 1827, when the General Assembly chose another replacement.

== Death and legacy ==
Rodney died at Lewes and is buried there in St. Peter's Episcopal Churchyard. His son George B. Rodney served in the U.S. House of Representatives from 1841 until 1845.

== Almanac ==
Elections were held the first Tuesday of October. The governor takes office the third Tuesday of January and had a three-year term. U.S. Representatives took office March 4 and have a two-year term. The General Assembly chose the U.S. Senators who also took office March 4, but for a six-year term.

Delaware General Assembly (sessions while Governor)
| Year | Assembly | Senate majority | Speaker | House majority | Speaker |
|---|---|---|---|---|---|
| 1808 | 38th | Federalist | Andrew Barratt | Federalist | Cornelius P. Comegys |
| 1809 | 39th | Federalist | Jesse Green | Federalist | Cornelius P. Comegys |
| 1810 | 40th | Federalist | Jesse Green | Federalist | Nathan Vickers |

Public offices
| Office | Type | Location | Began office | Ended office | Notes |
|---|---|---|---|---|---|
| Judge | Judiciary | Georgetown | 1793 | 1806 | Court of Common Pleas |
| Governor | Executive | Dover | January 18, 1814 | January 21, 1817 | |
| U.S. Representative | Legislature | Washington | October 1, 1822 | March 3, 1823 | |
| U.S. Senator | Legislature | Washington | November 8, 1826 | January 12, 1827 | |

United States congressional service
| Dates | Congress | Chamber | Majority | Committees | Class/District |
|---|---|---|---|---|---|
| 1821–1823 | 17th | U.S. House | Federalist | | 2nd at-large |
| 1825–1827 | 19th | U.S. Senate | Anti-Jacksonian | | class 2 |

Election results
| Year | Office | Subject | Party | Votes | % | Opponent | Party | Votes | % |
|---|---|---|---|---|---|---|---|---|---|
| 1810 | Governor | Daniel Rodney | Federalist | 3,593 | 50% | Joseph Haslet | Republican | 3,664 | 50% |
| 1813 | Governor | Daniel Rodney | Federalist | 4,643 | 55% | James Riddle | Republican | 3,768 | 45% |

Party political offices
| Preceded by George Truitt | Federalist nominee for Governor of Delaware; 1810, 1813 | Succeeded by John Clark |
Political offices
| Preceded by Joseph Haslet | Governor of Delaware; 1814–1817 | Succeeded by John Clark |
U.S. House of Representatives
| Preceded by Caesar A. Rodney | Member of the U.S. House of Representatives from Delaware's at-large congressional district October 1, 1822 – March 3, 1823 | Succeeded by Seat inactive |
U.S. Senate
| Preceded by Nicholas Van Dyke | U.S. senator from Delaware; November 8, 1826 – January 12, 1827 | Succeeded by Henry M. Ridgely |
