= Joseph Haslet =

American politician (1769–1823)

18th and 24th Governor of Delaware
- In office January 21, 1823 – June 20, 1823
- Preceded by: Caleb Rodney
- Succeeded by: Charles Thomas
- In office January 15, 1811 – January 18, 1814
- Preceded by: George Truitt
- Succeeded by: Daniel Rodney

Personal details
- Born: 1769 Milford, Delaware Colony
- Died: June 20, 1823 (aged 53–54) Sussex County, Delaware
- Party: Democratic-Republican
- Spouse(s): Mary Draper; Rachael Hickman
- Children: 1 son
- Parent: John Haslet
- Occupation: Planter

Joseph Haslet (1769 – June 20, 1823) was an American planter and politician from Cedar Creek Village in Cedar Creek Hundred, Sussex County, Delaware. He was a member of the Democratic-Republican Party, who served twice as Governor of Delaware.

== Early life and family ==
Haslet was born in Milford, Delaware, son of Colonel John Haslet and Jemima Molleston Brinkle Haslet. His father was the commander of the Delaware Regiment in the Continental Army and was killed at the Battle of Princeton in January 1777. Jemima Haslet died a month later "of an inflammation in the throat and lungs". Chief Justice William Killen became guardian for the children and eventually Joseph was apprenticed to a watchmaker in Wilmington. After he came of age he bought a farm in Cedar Creek Hundred in Sussex County. He first married Mary Draper, with whom he had one child, Nathaniel. He later married Rachel Hickman and they had at least three children.

== Professional and political career ==
Haslet ran for governor in 1804, losing to the Federalist candidate, Nathaniel Mitchell, and again in 1807, again losing to the Federalist candidate, George Truitt. Finally, in 1810 he squeaked out a victory against Federalist candidate Daniel Rodney and began his first term as Governor of Delaware, serving from January 15, 1811, until January 18, 1814.

The War of 1812 was the central event of Haslet's tenure as governor. Entry into the War of 1812 was not met with much approval from Federalist Delaware, but Haslet was a Democrat and called the General Assembly into special session to raise militia. Carol Hoffecker in Democracy in Delaware describes him saying: "'Without your aid', the governor told the predominantly Federalist legislators, 'compliance is impossible'. The militia was in shambles, he said, without arms or organization. But he was certain that Delaware would rise to the challenge. 'In this state it is not a question of whether the authority of the United States is to be respected. The State of Delaware will never hesitate to cooperate with her sister states in defending the common rights of the nation.'" The General Assembly then voted to create a 1,000 man militia and appropriated $25,000 to equip them.

At first, there were several exciting naval victories, including the capture of the British ship Frolic by Captain Jacob Jones of Smyrna, Delaware. He was brother-in-law of former Governor James Sykes. By February 1813, however, the British sent fleets into both the Delaware and Chesapeake Bays. For protection an encampment was built at "the Rocks" in Wilmington, Captain Caleb P. Bennett fortified New Castle, and Pea Patch Island was deeded to the U.S. Government so that there might be a fort built there.

Lewes was completely exposed and, as expected, received repeated demands for supplies by the British fleet. Haslet and the militia rushed to Lewes' defense. Having refused the demands, on April 6, 1813, Lewes was subjected to a furious all day bombardment, followed by a half-hearted landing the next day. The bombardment actually did little damage. Scharf's account reports "one chicken was killed and one pig wounded", but over 300 cannonballs were picked up, including 40 or 50 that were 32-pounders. The landing the next day was beaten off as well. By June the British simply landed at Milford and took what they needed. Meanwhile, the other British fleet was sailing the Chesapeake, raiding Havre de Grace, Georgetown, and Frenchtown, keeping everyone in New Castle County very nervous.

Eight years after leaving office Haslet ran for governor again and was elected by an even narrower margin than the first time, beating the Federalist candidate James Booth. It was a bitter campaign. Haslet was accused of being a former slave owner, and neglecting the Lewes defenses in 1813. Booth, on the other hand, was accused of being a Loyalist during the American Revolution. Haslet became the only man in the 19th century to win two terms as governor, but his combined victory margins were less than 100 votes. He served from January 21, 1823, for only five months until his death on June 20, 1823.

Delaware General Assembly (sessions while governor)
Year	Assembly	Senate majority	Speaker	House majority	Speaker
1811	35th	Federalist	James Sykes	Federalist	Cornelius P. Comegys
1812	36th	Federalist	James Sykes	Federalist	Cornelius P. Comegys
1813	37th	Federalist	Andrew Barratt	Federalist	Cornelius P. Comegys
1823	47th	Republican	Charles Thomas	Republican	George Clark Jr.

== Death and legacy ==
Haslet died at Cedar Creek Village in Cedar Creek Hundred, Sussex County. He was first buried on his farm at Cedar Creek Village, but was moved in 1917 to the Odd Fellows Cemetery at Milford. He appears to have died without any heirs, his only son, Nathaniel, having died in 1812 and his second wife, Rachael, in 1820. He was the fourth Governor of Delaware to die in office.

There is no known portrait of Joseph Haslet.

== Almanac ==
Elections were held the first Tuesday of October. The governor takes office the third Tuesday of January and had a three-year term.

Public offices
Office	Type	Location	Began office	Ended office	Notes
Governor	Executive	Dover	January 15, 1811	January 18, 1814	
Governor	Executive	Dover	January 21, 1823	June 20, 1823	died in office

Election results
Year	Office	Subject	Party	Votes	%	Opponent	Party	Votes	%
1804	Governor	Joseph Haslet	Republican	4,050	48%	Nathaniel Mitchell	Federalist	4,391	52%
1807	Governor	Joseph Haslet	Republican	3,062	48%	George Truitt	Federalist	3,309	52%
1810	Governor	Joseph Haslet	Republican	3,664	50%	Daniel Rodney	Federalist	3,593	50%
1822	Governor	Joseph Haslet	Republican	3,784	50%	James Booth	Federalist	3,762	50%

== Notes ==
- Conrad, Henry C. (1908). History of the State of Delaware. Lancaster, Pennsylvania: Wickersham Company.
- Hoffecker, Carol E. (2004). Democracy in Delaware. Wilmington, Delaware: Cedar Tree Books. ISBN 1-892142-23-6.
- Martin, Roger A. (1984). A History of Delaware Through its Governors. Wilmington, Delaware: McClafferty Press.
- Scharf, John Thomas (1888). History of Delaware 1609-1888. 2 vols. Philadelphia: L. J. Richards & Co.
- Wilson, Emerson. (1969). Forgotten Heroes of Delaware. Cambridge, Massachusetts: Deltos Publishing Company.

Party political offices
Preceded by David Hall	Democratic-Republican nominee for Governor of Delaware; 1804, 1807, 1810	Succeeded by James Riddle
Preceded by John Collins	Democratic-Republican nominee for Governor of Delaware; 1822	Succeeded by David Hazzard
Political offices
Preceded by George Truitt	Governor of Delaware; 1811–1814	Succeeded by Daniel Rodney
Preceded by Caleb Rodney	Governor of Delaware; 1823	Succeeded by Charles Thomas
