= George Truitt =

American politician (1756–1818)

17th Governor of Delaware
- In office January 19, 1808 – January 15, 1811
- Preceded by: Nathaniel Mitchell
- Succeeded by: Joseph Haslet

Member of the Delaware Senate
- In office January 4, 1803 – January 19, 1808

Personal details
- Born: 1756 Kent County, Delaware Colony
- Died: October 8, 1818 (aged 61–62) Kent County, Delaware
- Party: Federalist
- Spouse: Margaret (Mary) Hodgson

George Truitt (1756 – October 8, 1818) was an American politician who was the 17th Governor of Delaware from 1808 to 1811. A member of the Federalist Party, he served in the Delaware General Assembly from 1803 to 1808.

== Early life and family ==
Truitt was born in Murderkill Hundred, Kent County, Delaware, near Felton. His father was Samuel Truitt (1733–1788), his mother was Ester Sturgis (1737–1777). He was a descendant of George Truitt who settled in Accomack County, Virginia, in the 17th century.

He married Margaret "Mary" Hodgson and they had one child, Sarah. Their farm and primary residence was later known as Frazier Farm and is located east of Felton on the Canterbury Road, now State Route 15. They also had a home at 12 South Main Street in Camden. They were members of the Methodist Church.

== Professional and political career ==
He began his political career as a delegate to the state convention which ratified the United States Constitution of 1787. He then served five years in the state house from the 1788/89 session through the 1791/92 session and again in the 1794 session. He then served most of two terms in the state senate, from the 1803 session through the 1807 session. In 1807 he was elected Governor of Delaware, defeating Joseph Haslet the Democratic-Republican Party candidate. Truitt took office January 19, 1808, and served until January 15, 1811.

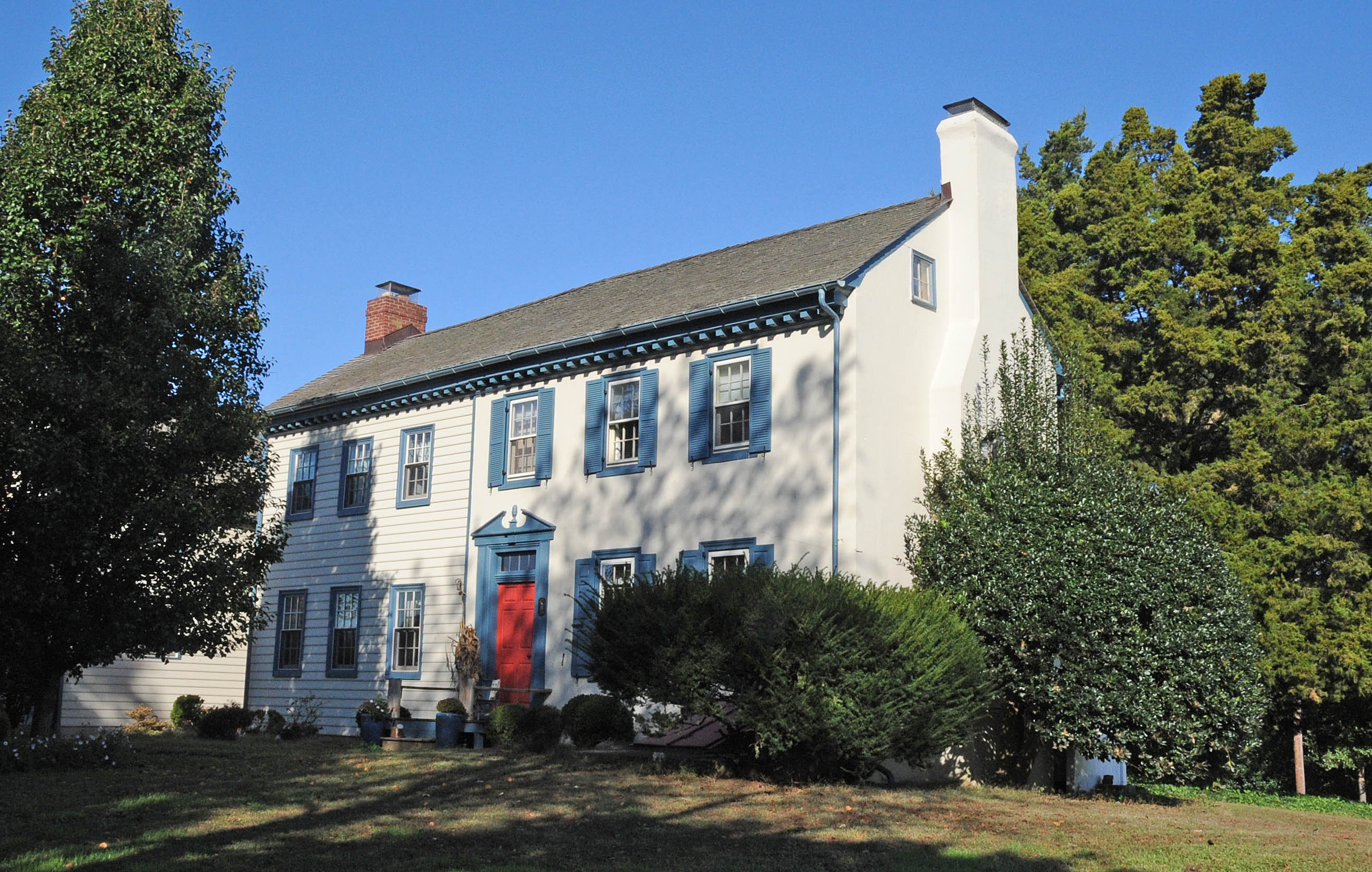
Gov. George Truitt House

Like other governors, Truitt was concerned about issues like slavery, penal reform, and public education. A new issue arose during his term, however. Due to increasing tensions with Great Britain, the U.S. government had directed Delaware to create and equip a militia of 1300 men. The General Assembly, in turn requested Federal fortification of Wilmington, New Castle, Port Penn, Reedy Island, and Lewes. Being descendant of George Truitt 1640 who landed in Va. on a land grant from King George of England. Who exchanged his land in Northern England for the tract in the New world.

== Death and legacy ==
Truitt died at his farm in Murderkill Hundred, Kent County, near Felton, and was buried there. In 1903 he was reburied in the Barratt's Chapel Cemetery near Frederica, Delaware. The Gov. George Truitt House was listed on the National Register of Historic Places in 1978.

No known portrait of George Truitt exists.

Delaware General Assembly (sessions while Governor)
| Year | Assembly | Senate majority | Speaker | House majority | Speaker |
|---|---|---|---|---|---|
| 1808 | 32nd | Federalist | James Sykes | Federalist | Stephen Lewis |
| 1809 | 33rd | Federalist | James Sykes | Federalist | Stephen Lewis |
| 1810 | 34th | Federalist | James Sykes | Federalist | Stephen Lewis |

== Almanac ==
Elections were held October 1 and members of the General Assembly took office on October 20 or the following weekday. State assemblymen had a one-year term.

Beginning in 1792 elections were held the first Tuesday of October and members of the General Assembly took office the first Tuesday of January. The State Legislative Council was renamed the state senate and the State House of Assembly became the State House of Representatives. State senators had a three-year term and state representatives had a one-year term. The governor takes office the third Tuesday of January and had a three-year term.

Public offices
| Office | Type | Location | Began office | Ended office | Notes |
|---|---|---|---|---|---|
| Delegate | Convention | Dover | | December 7, 1787 | ratification |
| Assemblyman | Legislature | Dover | October 20, 1788 | October 20, 1789 | |
| Assemblyman | Legislature | Dover | October 20, 1789 | October 20, 1790 | |
| Assemblyman | Legislature | Dover | October 20, 1790 | October 20, 1791 | |
| Assemblyman | Legislature | Dover | October 20, 1791 | October 20, 1792 | |
| State Representative | Legislature | Dover | January 7, 1794 | January 6, 1795 | |
| State Senator | Legislature | Dover | January 4, 1803 | January 7, 1806 | |
| State Senator | Legislature | Dover | January 7, 1806 | January 19, 1808 | |
| Governor | Executive | Dover | January 19, 1808 | January 15, 1811 | |

Delaware General Assembly service
| Dates | Assembly | Chamber | Majority | Governor | Committees | District |
|---|---|---|---|---|---|---|
| 1788/89 | 13th | State House | non partisan | Thomas Collins | | Kent at-large |
| 1789/90 | 14th | State House | non partisan | Joshua Clayton | | Kent at-large |
| 1790/91 | 15th | State House | non partisan | Joshua Clayton | | Kent at-large |
| 1791/92 | 16th | State House | non partisan | Joshua Clayton | | Kent at-large |
| 1794 | 18th | State House | Federalist | Joshua Clayton | | Kent at-large |
| 1803 | 27th | State Senate | Federalist | David Hall | | Kent at-large |
| 1804 | 28th | State Senate | Federalist | David Hall | | Kent at-large |
| 1805 | 29th | State Senate | Federalist | Nathaniel Mitchell | | Kent at-large |
| 1806 | 30th | State Senate | Federalist | Nathaniel Mitchell | | Kent at-large |
| 1807 | 31st | State Senate | Federalist | Nathaniel Mitchell | | Kent at-large |

Election results
| Year | Office | Subject | Party | Votes | % | Opponent | Party | Votes | % |
|---|---|---|---|---|---|---|---|---|---|
| 1807 | Governor | George Truitt | Federalist | 3,309 | 52% | Joseph Haslet | Democratic-Republican | 3,062 | 48% |

== Places with more information ==
- Delaware Historical Society; website; 505 North Market Street, Wilmington, Delaware 19801; (302) 655-7161.
- University of Delaware; Library website; 181 South College Avenue, Newark, Delaware 19717; (302) 831-2965.
- Barrat's Chapel Cemetery; 6416 Bay Road, Frederica, Delaware; (302) 335-5544.

Party political offices
| Preceded by Nathaniel Mitchell | Federalist nominee for Governor of Delaware; 1807 | Succeeded by Daniel Rodney |
