= 63rd Delaware General Assembly =

American legislative session

←	62nd	64th	→

Overview
- Legislative body: Delaware General Assembly
- Term: January 7, 1845 – January 5, 1847

The 63rd Delaware General Assembly was a meeting of the legislative branch of the state government, consisting of the Delaware Senate and the Delaware House of Representatives. Elections were held the first Tuesday after November 1 and terms began on the first Tuesday in January. It met in Dover, convening January 7, 1845, two weeks before the beginning of the first and second year of the administration of Governor Thomas Stockton. He died March 2, 1846, and was replaced by Joseph Maull, but he died May 3, 1846, and was replaced by William Temple for the remainder of the term.

The apportionment of seats was permanently assigned to three senators and seven representatives for each of the three counties. Population of the county did not effect the number of delegates. Both chambers had a Whig majority.

== Leadership ==
=== Senate ===
- Joseph Maull, Sussex County

=== House of Representatives ===
- William Temple, Kent County
- William O. Redden, Sussex County

== Members ==
=== Senate ===
Senators were elected by the public for a four-year term, some elected each two year.

New Castle County

- Mahlon Betts
- David McAllister
- Robert Ocheltree

Kent County

- George Fisher
- Willam Roe
- Joseph Smithers

Sussex County

- George P. Fisher
- Warren Jefferson
- Joseph Maull

=== House of Representative ===
Representatives were elected by the public for a term, every two years.

New Castle County

- John Allen
- Samuel Burnham
- Thomas Caulk
- William M. Day
- William Kennedy
- Stephen M Staples
- Lewis Thompson

Kent County

- John W. Adkins
- William Cowgill
- George P. Fisher
- John Gruwell
- Joseph Hoffecker
- Shadrack Raughley
- William Temple

Sussex County

- William Cannon
- Samuel Paynter
- William Porter
- Thompson Robinson
- Joseph Smith
- John West
- Charles Wright

== Places with more information ==
- Delaware Historical Society; website; 505 North Market Street, Wilmington, Delaware 19801; (302) 655–7161.
- University of Delaware; Library website; 181 South College Avenue, Newark, Delaware 19717; (302) 831–2965.
