= 65th Delaware General Assembly =

American legislative session

←	64th	66th	→

Overview
- Legislative body: Delaware General Assembly
- Term: January 2, 1849 – January 7, 1851

The 65th Delaware General Assembly was a meeting of the legislative branch of the state government, consisting of the Delaware Senate and the Delaware House of Representatives. Elections were held the first Tuesday after November 1 and terms began on the first Tuesday in January. It met in Dover, convening January 2, 1849, two weeks before the beginning of the third and fourth year of the administration of Governor William Tharp.

The apportionment of seats was permanently assigned to three senators and seven representatives for each of the three counties. Population of the county did not effect the number of delegates. Both chambers had a Whig majority.

== Leadership ==
=== Senate ===
- William W. Morris, Kent County

=== House of Representatives ===
- Daniel Cummins, Kent County

== Members ==
=== Senate ===
Senators were elected by the public for a four-year term, some elected each two year.

New Castle County

- Samuel Burnhan
- James H. Hoffecker
- John D. Turner

Kent County

- Levin H. Adams
- William W. Morris
- William Temple

Sussex County

- Henry B. Fiddeman
- Thomas Jacobs
- Samuel R. Paynter

=== House of Representatives ===
Representatives were elected by the public for a term, every two years.

New Castle County

- Edward T. Bellah
- Edward G. Bradford Sr.
- Benjamin Caulk
- Levi G. Cooch
- James L. Miles
- Elias S. Naudain
- Thomas M. Rodney

Kent County

- Paris T. Carlisle
- John A. Collins
- Joseph P. Comegys
- Daniel Cummins
- James Postles
- Henry Taylor
- Edward W. Wilson

Sussex County

- Philip C. Jones
- John Marshall
- John Martin
- Thomas Robinson
- Nathaniel Tunnell
- William Tunnell
- Samuel D. Vaughn

== Places with more information ==
- Delaware Historical Society; website; 505 North Market Street, Wilmington, Delaware 19801; (302) 655-7161.
- University of Delaware; Library website; 181 South College Avenue, Newark, Delaware 19717; (302) 831-2965.
