= 41st Delaware General Assembly =

American legislative session

←	40th	42nd	→

Overview
- Legislative body: Delaware General Assembly
- Term: January 7, 1817 – January 6, 1818

The 41st Delaware General Assembly was a meeting of the legislative branch of the state government, consisting of the Delaware Senate and the Delaware House of Representatives. Elections were held the first Tuesday of October and terms began on the first Tuesday in January. It met in Dover, convening January 7, 1817, two weeks before the beginning of the first year of the administration of Governor John Clark.

The apportionment of seats was permanently assigned to three senators and seven representatives for each of the three counties. Population of the county did not effect the number of delegates. Both chambers had a Federalist majority.

== Leadership ==
=== Senate ===
- Henry Molleston, Sussex County

=== House of Representatives ===
- Nathan Vickers, Sussex County

== Members ==
=== Senate ===
Senators were elected by the public for a three-year term, one third posted each year.

New Castle County

- George Clark Jr.
- Caesar Augustus Rodney
- Nicholas Van Dyke Jr.

Kent County

- George Cummins
- Henry Molleston
- Jacob Stout

Sussex County

- Benjamin Burton
- Jesse Green
- Joseph Maull

=== House of Representatives ===
Representatives were elected by the public for a one-year term.

New Castle County

- Samuel H. Black
- John T. Cochran
- Joseph W. Cochran
- Victor du Pont
- Andrew Gray
- Arnold S. Naudain
- Peter Vandever

Kent County

- James Battell
- Thomas Condy
- John Cummins
- John Mitchell
- Joseph G. Rowland
- Spencer Williams
- John Wood

Sussex County

- Isaiah Burton
- John Carlisle
- William B. Cooper
- Charles M. Cullen
- Solomon Evans
- David Smith
- Nathan Vickers

== Places with more information ==
- Delaware Historical Society; website; 505 North Market Street, Wilmington, Delaware 19801; (302) 655-7161.
- University of Delaware; Library website; 181 South College Avenue, Newark, Delaware 19717; (302) 831-2965.
