= 1846 Delaware gubernatorial special election =

- November 3, 1846
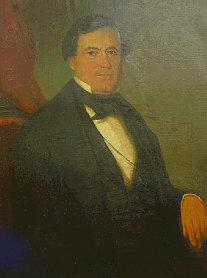

Nominee	William Tharp	Peter F. Causey
Party	Democratic	Whig
Popular vote	6,148	6,012
Percentage	50.56%	49.44%
- County results Tharp: 50–60%
Governor before election
William Temple
Whig
Elected Governor
William Tharp
Democratic

The 1846 Delaware gubernatorial special election was held on November 3, 1846. A year into the term of Whig Governor Thomas Stockton, elected in 1844, he died, elevating State Senate Speaker Joseph Maull to the governorship. Maull, in turn, also died, making State House Speaker William Temple Governor. Former State Representative Peter F. Causey ran as the Whig nominee to succeed Temple, and faced former State Senator William Tharp, the Democratic nominee from 1844. Tharp narrowly defeated Causey, returning the Governorship to the Democratic Party.

== General election ==
=== Results ===
1846 Delaware gubernatorial special election
Party	Candidate	Votes	%	±%
Democratic	William Tharp	6,148	50.56%	+0.74%
Whig	Peter F. Causey	6,012	49.44%	−0.74%
Majority		136	1.12%	+0.75%
Turnout		12,160	100.00%	
Democratic gain from Whig				

== Bibliography ==
- Gubernatorial Elections, 1787-1997. Washington, D.C.: Congressional Quarterly Inc. 1998. ISBN 1-56802-396-0.
- Glashan, Roy R. (1979). American Governors and Gubernatorial Elections, 1775-1978. Meckler Books. ISBN 0-930466-17-9.
- Dubin, Michael J. (2003). United States Gubernatorial Elections, 1776-1860: The Official Results by State and County. Jefferson, North Carolina: McFarland. ISBN 978-0-7864-1439-0.
