= 61st Delaware General Assembly =

American legislative session

←	60th	62nd	→

Overview
- Legislative body: Delaware General Assembly
- Term: January 5, 1841 – January 3, 1843

The 61st Delaware General Assembly was a meeting of the legislative branch of the state government, consisting of the Delaware Senate and the Delaware House of Representatives. Elections were held the first Tuesday after November 1 and terms began on the first Tuesday in January. It met in Dover, Delaware, convening January 5, 1841, two weeks before the beginning of the first and second year of the administration of Governor William B. Cooper.

The apportionment of seats was permanently assigned to three senators and seven representatives for each of the three counties. Population of the county did not effect the number of delegates. Both chambers had a Whig majority.

== Leadership ==
=== Senate ===
- Charles Polk Jr., Kent County

=== House of Representatives ===
- Robert Houston, Sussex County

== Members ==
=== Senate ===
Senators were elected by the public for a four-year term, some elected each two year.

New Castle County

- Abraham Boyce
- Thomas Deakyne
  - Andrew S. Naudain
- Charles I. du Pont

Kent County

- Charles Polk Jr.
- Presley Spruance Jr.
- William Tharp

Sussex County

- Stansbury Jacobs
- Thomas Jacobs
- Joseph Maull

=== House of Representatives ===
Representatives were elected by the public for a term, every two years.

New Castle County

- Samuel Barr
- Mahlon Betts
- Robert M. Black
- Palmer Chamberlain
- John Dale
- Alfred Francis
- John Higgins

Kent County

- John Clements
- John A. Collins
- John Frazier
- William Huffington
- Alexander Johnson
- Samuel Virden
- James D. Wilds

Sussex County

- William Hill
- Robert Houston
- Richard Jefferson
- Aaron Marshall Jr.
- John Sudler
- Robert Walpes
- Gardiner H. Wright

== Places with more information ==
- Delaware Historical Society; website; 505 North Market Street, Wilmington, Delaware 19801; (302) 655-7161.
- University of Delaware; Library website; 181 South College Avenue, Newark, Delaware 19717; (302) 831-2965.
