= 1844 Delaware gubernatorial election =

- November 5, 1844
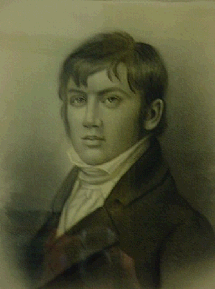

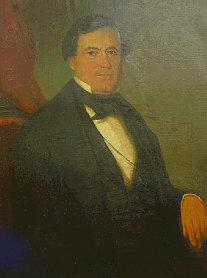
Nominee	Thomas Stockton	William Tharp
Party	Whig	Democratic
Popular vote	6,140	6,095
Percentage	50.18%	49.82%
- County results Stockton: 50–60% Tharp: 50–60%
Governor before election
William B. Cooper
Whig
Elected Governor
Thomas Stockton
Whig

The 1844 Delaware gubernatorial election was held on November 5, 1844. Whig Governor William B. Cooper was unable to seek re-election to a second term. Thomas Stockton, the former New Castle County Register in Chancery, ran as the Whig nominee to succeed Cooper. He faced former State Senator William Tharp, the Democratic nominee. Despite the state's strong financial condition, Whigs came close to losing their grip on power; Stockton only defeated Tharp by 45 votes, or 0.37%. However, Stockton died a year into his term, on March 2, 1846, elevating the Speaker of the State Senate, Joseph Maull, to the governorship, and triggering a special election in 1846. Maull, served just two months before he, too died, elevating State House Speaker William Temple to the governorship.

== General election ==
=== Results ===
1844 Delaware gubernatorial election
Party	Candidate	Votes	%	±%
Whig	Thomas Stockton	6,140	50.18%	−3.61%
Democratic	William Tharp	6,095	49.82%	+3.61%
Majority		45	0.37%	−7.23%
Turnout		12,235	100.00%	
Whig hold				

== Bibliography ==
- Gubernatorial Elections, 1787-1997. Washington, D.C.: Congressional Quarterly Inc. 1998. ISBN 1-56802-396-0.
- Glashan, Roy R. (1979). American Governors and Gubernatorial Elections, 1775-1978. Meckler Books. ISBN 0-930466-17-9.
- Dubin, Michael J. (2003). United States Gubernatorial Elections, 1776-1860: The Official Results by State and County. Jefferson, North Carolina: McFarland. ISBN 978-0-7864-1439-0.
