= 67th Delaware General Assembly =

American legislative session

←	66th	68th	→

Overview
- Legislative body: Delaware General Assembly
- Term: January 4, 1853 – January 2, 1855

The 67th Delaware General Assembly was a meeting of the legislative branch of the state government, consisting of the Delaware Senate and the Delaware House of Representatives. Elections were held the first Tuesday after November 1 and terms began on the first Tuesday in January. It met in Dover, convening January 4, 1853, two weeks before the beginning of the third and fourth year of the administration of Governor William H. H. Ross.

The apportionment of seats was permanently assigned to three senators and seven representatives for each of the three counties. Population of the county did not effect the number of delegates. Both chambers had a Democratic majority.

== Leadership ==
=== Senate ===
- John M. Phillips, Sussex County

=== House of Representatives ===
- John R. McFee, Sussex County

== Members ==
=== Senate ===
Senators were elected by the public for a four-year term, some elected each two year.

New Castle County

- Charles I. du Pont
- Bassett Ferguson
- William Smith

Kent County

- Daniel Currey
- Isaac Jump
- William Temple

Sussex County

- John M. Phillips
- John Ponder
- John Sorden

=== House of Representatives ===
Representatives were elected by the public for a term, every two years.

New Castle County

- Ephraim Beaston
- Alexander M. Biddle
- James Delaplaine
- Jesher H. Dixon
- Charles Goodling
- John A. Reynolds
- Joshua S. Valentine

Kent County

- Paris T. Carlisle
- John G. Chambers
- Benjamin L. Collins
- Manlove Hayes
- Eli Saulsbury
- Merritt Scotton
- William Thompson

Sussex County

- Benjamin Burton
- James F. Burtin
- John Day
- James F. Martin
- John R. McFee
- William W. Morgan
- Alfred Short

== Places with more information ==
- Delaware Historical Society; website; 505 North Market Street, Wilmington, Delaware 19801; (302) 655-7161.
- University of Delaware; Library website; 181 South College Avenue, Newark, Delaware 19717; (302) 831-2965.
