= 43rd Delaware General Assembly =

American legislative session

←	42nd	44th	→

Overview
- Legislative body: Delaware General Assembly
- Term: January 5, 1819 – January 4, 1820

The 43rd Delaware General Assembly was a meeting of the legislative branch of the state government, consisting of the Delaware Senate and the Delaware House of Representatives. Elections were held the first Tuesday of October and terms began on the first Tuesday in January. It met in Dover, convening January 5, 1819, two weeks before the beginning of the third year of the administration of Governor John Clark.

The apportionment of seats was permanently assigned to three senators and seven representatives for each of the three counties. Population of the county did not effect the number of delegates. Both chambers had a Federalist majority.

== Leadership ==
=== Senate ===
- Henry Molleston, Sussex County

=== House of Representatives ===
- Nathan Vickers, Sussex County

== Members ==
=== Senate ===
Senators were elected by the public for a three-year term, one third posted each year.

New Castle County

- Samuel H. Black
- George Clark Jr.
- Andrew Gray

Kent County

- George Cummins
- Henry Molleston
- Jacob Stout

Sussex County

- Edward Dingle Jr.
- Joseph Maull
- Caleb Rodney

=== House of Representatives ===
Representatives were elected by the public for a one-year term.

New Castle County

- Jesse Chandler
- John T. Cochran
- John Crawford
  - Peter B. Delany
- John Crow
- Joseph W. Day
- Isaac S. Hendrickson
- Henry G. Whitely

Kent County

- Martin W. Bates
- Jacob Boone
- John Booth
- Joshua G. Brinckle
- John Cummins
- Jonathan Jenkins
- John Mitchell

Sussex County

- Isaiah Burton
- John Carlisle
- Charles M. Cullen
- John Dickerson
- William N. Polk
- David Smith
- Nathan Vickers

== Places with more information ==
- Delaware Historical Society; website; 505 North Market Street, Wilmington, Delaware 19801; (302) 655-7161.
- University of Delaware; Library website; 181 South College Avenue, Newark, Delaware 19717; (302) 831-2965.
