= 66th Delaware General Assembly =

American legislative session

←	65th	67th	→

Overview
- Legislative body: Delaware General Assembly
- Term: January 7, 1851 – January 4, 1853

The 66th Delaware General Assembly was a meeting of the legislative branch of the state government, consisting of the Delaware Senate and the Delaware House of Representatives. Elections were held the first Tuesday after November 1 and terms began on the first Tuesday in January. It met in Dover, convening January 7, 1851, two weeks before the beginning of the first and second year of the administration of Governor William H. H. Ross.

The apportionment of seats was permanently assigned to three senators and seven representatives for each of the three counties. Population of the county did not effect the number of delegates. Both chambers had a Democratic majority.

== Leadership ==
=== Senate ===
- John M. Phillips, Sussex County

=== House of Representatives ===
- Samuel Jefferson, New Castle County

== Members ==
=== Senate ===
Senators were elected by the public for a four-year term, some elected each two year.

New Castle County

- Bassett Ferguson
- James H. Hoffecker
- William Smith

Kent County

- Levin H. Adams
- Isaac Jump
- William Temple

Sussex County

- Henry B. Fiddeman
- John M. Phillips
- John Sorden

=== House of Representatives ===
Representatives were elected by the public for a term, every two years.

New Castle County

- Nathan T. Boulden
- Abraham Boyce
- Aguilla Derrickson
- Samuel Jefferson
- William C. Lodge
- Albert O. Newtown
- James B. Rogers

Kent County

- John G. Chambers
- Francis B. Harper
- Benjamin Harrington
- Nathan C. Powell
- Caleb Smithers
- Elias Smithers
- Enoch Spruance

Sussex County

- John Hosea
- Peter Marsh
- John Martin
- Jod Pride
- James Satterfield
- John W. Scribner
- William D. Waples

== Places with more information ==
- Delaware Historical Society; website; 505 North Market Street, Wilmington, Delaware 19801; (302) 655-7161.
- University of Delaware; Library website; 181 South College Avenue, Newark, Delaware 19717; (302) 831-2965.
