= 60th Delaware General Assembly =

American legislative session

←	59th	61st	→

Overview
- Legislative body: Delaware General Assembly
- Term: January 1, 1839 – January 5, 1841

The 60th Delaware General Assembly (1839-1841) was a meeting of the legislative branch of the state government, consisting of the Delaware Senate and the Delaware House of Representatives. Elections were held the first Tuesday after November 1 and terms began on the first Tuesday in January. It met in Dover, Delaware, convening January 1, 1839, two weeks before the beginning of the third and fourth years of the administration of Governor Cornelius P. Comegys.

The apportionment of seats was permanently assigned to three senators and seven representatives for each of the three counties. Population of the county did not effect the number of delegates. Both chambers had a Democratic majority.

== Leadership ==
=== Senate ===
- Thomas Jacobs, Sussex County

=== House of Representatives ===
- John P. Brinckloe, Sussex County

== Members ==
=== Senate ===
Senators were elected by the public for a four-year term, some elected each two year.

New Castle County

- Abraham Boyce
- Thomas Deakyne
- William Herdman

Kent County

- Elias Naudain Jr.
- Charles Polk Jr.
- William Tharp

Sussex County

- Thomas Jacobs
- Joseph Maull
- Henry F. Rodney

=== House of Representatives ===
Representatives were elected by the public for a term, every two years.

New Castle County

- Alexander M. Biddle
- Nathan T. Boulden
- John D. Dilworth
- William H. Jones
- Andrew Kerr
- William H. Rogers
- Henry Williamson

Kent County

- Samuel B. Cooper
- Philip Fiddeman
- Robert Frame
- John Frazier
- Henry Pratt
- Thomas A. Rees
- Presley Spruance Jr.

Sussex County

- John P. Brinckloe
- James Hopkins
- Robert Hopkins
- Robert Houston
- Richard Jefferson
- Aaron Marshall Jr.
- Joseph W. Neal

== Places with more information ==
- Delaware Historical Society; website; 505 North Market Street, Wilmington, Delaware 19801; (302) 655-7161.
- University of Delaware; Library website; 181 South College Avenue, Newark, Delaware 19717; (302) 831-2965.
