= 42nd Delaware General Assembly =

American legislative session

←	41st	43rd	→

Overview
- Legislative body: Delaware General Assembly
- Term: January 6, 1818 – January 5, 1819

The 42nd Delaware General Assembly was a meeting of the legislative branch of the state government, consisting of the Delaware Senate and the Delaware House of Representatives. Elections were held the first Tuesday of October and terms began on the first Tuesday in January. It met in Dover, Delaware, convening January 6, 1818, two weeks before the beginning of the second year of the administration of Governor John Clark.

The apportionment of seats was permanently assigned to three senators and seven representatives for each of the three counties. Population of the county did not effect the number of delegates. Both chambers had a Federalist majority.

== Leadership ==
=== Senate ===
- Henry Molleston, Sussex County

=== House of Representatives ===
- Nathan Vickers, Sussex County

== Members ==
=== Senate ===
Senators were elected by the public for a three-year term, one third posted each year.

New Castle County

- Samuel H. Black
- George Clark Jr.
- Andrew Gray

Kent County

- George Cummins
- Henry Molleston
- Jacob Stout

Sussex County

- Benjamin Burton
- Joseph Maull
- Caleb Rodney

=== House of Representatives ===
Representatives were elected by the public for a one-year term.

New Castle County

- Jesse Chandler
- John T. Cochran
- Isaac S. Henderson
- Arnold Naudain
- John Pierce
- Charles Thomas Jr.
- Henry G. Whitely

Kent County

- John Booth
- Thomas Condy
- John Cummins
- Charles Kimmey
- Charles Polk Jr.
- Joseph G. Rowland
- Spencer Williams

Sussex County

- Isaiah Burton
- Solomon Evans
- William W. Green
- William N. Polk
- Peter Robinson
- David Smith
- Nathan Vickers

== Places with more information ==
- Delaware Historical Society; website; 505 North Market Street, Wilmington, Delaware 19801; (302) 655-7161.
- University of Delaware; Library website; 181 South College Avenue, Newark, Delaware 19717; (302) 831-2965.
