= 64th Delaware General Assembly =

American legislative session

←	63rd	65th	→

Overview
- Legislative body: Delaware General Assembly
- Term: January 5, 1847 – January 2, 1849

The 64th Delaware General Assembly was a meeting of the legislative branch of the state government, consisting of the Delaware Senate and the Delaware House of Representatives. Elections were held the first Tuesday after November 1 and terms began on the first Tuesday in January. It met in Dover, convening January 5, 1847, two weeks before the beginning of the first and second year of the administration of Governor William Tharp.

The apportionment of seats was permanently assigned to three senators and seven representatives for each of the three counties. Population of the county did not effect the number of delegates. Both chambers had a Whig majority.

== Leadership ==
=== Senate ===
- William W. Morris, Kent County

=== House of Representatives ===
- Lewis Thompson, New Castle County

== Members ==
=== Senate ===
Senators were elected by the public for a four-year term, some elected each two year.

New Castle County

- Mahlon Betts
- Samuel Burnhan
- John D. Turner

Kent County

- George Fisher
- William W. Morris
- Presley Spruance Jr.

Sussex County

- Thomas Jacobs
- Warren Jefferson
- Samuel R. Paynter

=== House of Representatives ===
Representatives were elected by the public for a term, every two years.

New Castle County

- John Allen
- Levi G. Cooch
- William M. Day
- John W. Evans
- William H. Smith
- Henry Swayne
- Lewis Thompson

Kent County

- William R. Cahoon
- Thomas Lockwood
- Henry W. McIlvaine
- William Nickerson
- Thomas L. Temple
- Thomas Wallace
- John Woodall Jr.

Sussex County

- Jacob Bounds
- James F. Burton
- William Cannon
- Peter Marsh
- John M. Phillips
- John W. Scribner
- Purnal Tatman

== Places with more information ==
- Delaware Historical Society; website; 505 North Market Street, Wilmington, Delaware 19801; (302) 655-7161.
- University of Delaware; Library website; 181 South College Avenue, Newark, Delaware 19717; (302) 831-2965.
