= 62nd Delaware General Assembly =

American legislative session

←	61st	63rd	→

Overview
- Legislative body: Delaware General Assembly
- Term: January 3, 1843 – January 7, 1845

The 62nd Delaware General Assembly was a meeting of the legislative branch of the state government, consisting of the Delaware Senate and the Delaware House of Representatives. Elections were held the first Tuesday after November 1 and terms began on the first Tuesday in January. It met in Dover, convening January 3, 1843, two weeks before the beginning of the third and fourth year of the administration of Governor William B. Cooper.

The apportionment of seats was permanently assigned to three senators and seven representatives for each of the three counties. Population of the county did not effect the number of delegates. Both chambers had a Whig majority.

== Leadership ==
=== Senate ===
- Presley Spruance Jr., Kent County

=== House of Representatives ===
- William O. Redden, Sussex County

== Members ==
=== Senate ===
Senators were elected by the public for a four-year term, some elected each two year.

New Castle County

- Charles I. du Pont
- David McAllister
- Robert Ocheltree

Kent County

- Willam Roe
- Joseph Smithers
- Presley Spruance Jr.

Sussex County

- George P. Fisher
- Stansbury Jacobs
- Joseph Maull

=== House of Representatives ===
Representatives were elected by the public for a term, every two years.

New Castle County

- William Booth
- Harland Cloud
- John Harlan
- William Kennedy
- Andrew Kerr
- Samuel Townsend Jr.
- David C. Wilson

Kent County

- Lewis H. Adams
- Paris T. Carlisle
- Joseph P. Compegys
- John Gruwell
- Robert Jones
- James Knight
- William Shaw

Sussex County

- Benjamin Burton
- William Hill
- Richard Jefferson
- William O. Redden
- Charles G. Ridgely
- John D. Rodney
- Robert Walpes

== Places with more information ==
- Delaware Historical Society; website; 505 North Market Street, Wilmington, Delaware 19801; (302) 655-7161.
- University of Delaware; Library website; 181 South College Avenue, Newark, Delaware 19717; (302) 831-2965.
