= George P. Fisher =

American judge (1817–1899)

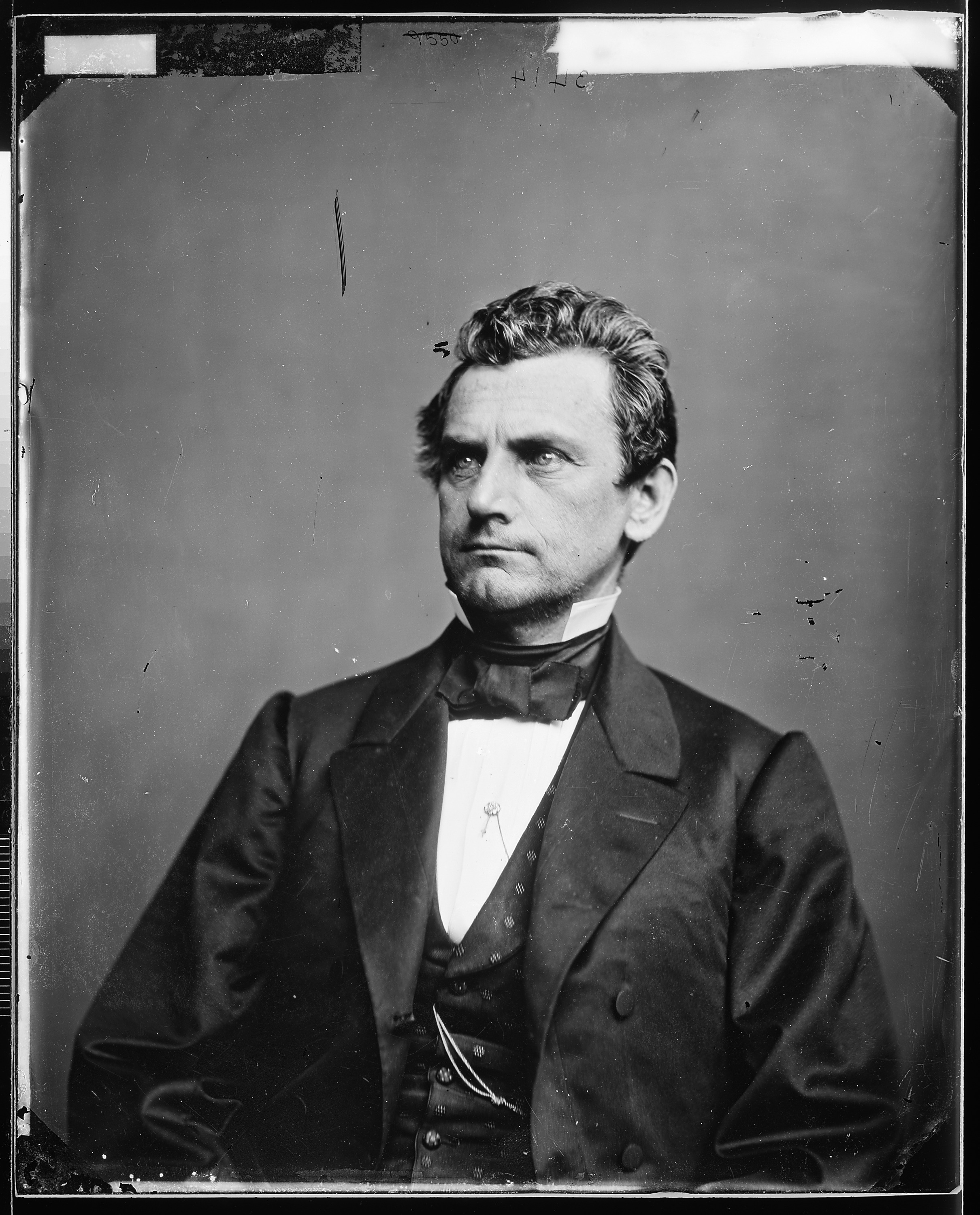
- Fisher, c. 1860–1865

Associate Justice of the Supreme Court of the District of Columbia
- In office March 11, 1863 – May 1, 1870
- Appointed by: Abraham Lincoln
- Preceded by: Seat established by 12 Stat. 762
- Succeeded by: David Campbell Humphreys

Member of the U.S. House of Representatives from Delaware's at-large district
- In office March 4, 1861 – March 3, 1863
- Preceded by: William G. Whiteley
- Succeeded by: William Temple

Attorney General of Delaware
- In office 1855–1860
- Governor: Peter F. Causey; William Burton
- Preceded by: Willard Saulsbury Sr.
- Succeeded by: Alfred Wooten

Personal details
- Born: George Purnell Fisher; October 13, 1817 Milford, Delaware, U.S.
- Died: February 10, 1899 (aged 81) Washington, D.C., U.S.
- Resting place: Methodist Cemetery; Dover, Delaware
- Party: Union
- Education: Dickinson College read law

George Purnell Fisher (October 13, 1817 – February 10, 1899) was Attorney General of Delaware, Secretary of State of Delaware, a United States representative from Delaware and an Associate Justice of the Supreme Court of the District of Columbia (now the United States District Court for the District of Columbia).

== Education and career ==
Born on October 13, 1817, in Milford, Sussex County, Delaware, Fisher attended the public schools of Kent County, Delaware, Mount St. Mary's College (now Mount St. Mary's University) in Emmitsburg, Maryland, then graduated from Dickinson College in Carlisle, Pennsylvania, in July 1838. He read law with John M. Clayton, then the Chief Justice of the Delaware Supreme Court, and was admitted to the bar in 1841. He entered private practice in Dover, Delaware, starting in 1841. He was clerk for the Delaware Senate in 1843. He was a member of the Delaware House of Representatives in 1844. He was appointed Secretary of State of Delaware by Governor Joseph Maull, serving from 1846 to 1847. He was Aide-de-camp to Major General Nathaniel Young, Commander of the Delaware Militia, starting in 1846. He was confidential clerk to United States Secretary of State John M. Clayton from 1849 to 1850. Fisher assisted in negotiating the Clayton–Bulwer Treaty with Great Britain. He was a Commissioner to settle claims of United States Citizens against Brazil from 1850 to 1852. He was private secretary for President Millard Fillmore starting in 1852. He was Attorney General of Delaware from 1855 to 1860.

== Congressional service ==
Fisher was elected as a Unionist from Delaware's at-large congressional district to the United States House of Representatives of the 37th United States Congress, serving from March 4, 1861, to March 3, 1863. He was an unsuccessful candidate for reelection in 1862 to the 38th United States Congress. Following his departure from Congress, he was a Colonel in the First Delaware Cavalry in 1863.

=== Compensated emancipation proposal ===
In Congress, Fisher supported Abraham Lincoln's compensated emancipation proposal, but failed to find someone in the Delaware General Assembly willing to introduce it.

== Federal judicial service ==
Fisher was nominated by President Abraham Lincoln on March 10, 1863, to the Supreme Court of the District of Columbia (now the United States District Court for the District of Columbia) to a new Associate Justice seat authorized by 12 Stat. 762. He was confirmed by the United States Senate on March 11, 1863, and received his commission the same day. His service ended on May 1, 1870, with his resignation.

=== Notable case ===
In 1867, Fisher presided over the trial of John Surratt, one of the Lincoln assassination conspirators.

== Later career ==
Following his resignation from the federal bench, Fisher served as United States Attorney for the District of Columbia from 1870 to 1875. After leaving this position (according to his biography by Charles B. Lore), he had "no intention of again entering public life." However, he was appointed by President Benjamin Harrison on May 31, 1889, to serve as first auditor for the United States Department of the Treasury until March 23, 1893.

== Later years and death ==
Fisher "then returned to the home of his childhood, lived quietly in his extensive library, and devoted the last years of his life to reading and literary pursuits." He died after a short illness on February 10, 1899, in Washington, D.C. He was interred in Oak Hill Cemetery in Washington, D.C., and re-interred in the Methodist Cemetery in Dover.

== Election results ==
Election results
Year	Office	Subject	Party	votes	%	Opponent	Party	votes	%
1860	U.S. Representative	George P. Fisher	Republican	7,732	48%	Benjamin T. Biggs	Democratic	7,485	47%
1862	U.S. Representative	George P. Fisher	Republican	8,014	50%	William Temple	Democratic	8,051	50%

== Sources ==
- Martin, Roger A. (2003). Delawareans in Congress, the House of Representatives 1789-1900. ISBN 0-924117-26-5.
- United States Congress. "George P. Fisher (id: F000147)". Biographical Directory of the United States Congress.
- "Delaware United States Senators". www.russpickett.com.
- "The Political Graveyard: Index to Politicians: Fisher". politicalgraveyard.com.

U.S. House of Representatives
Preceded by William G. Whiteley	Member of the U.S. House of Representatives from Delaware's at-large congressional district 1861–1863	Succeeded by William Temple
Legal offices
Preceded by Willard Saulsbury Sr.	Attorney General of Delaware; 1855–1860	Succeeded by Alfred Wooten
New seat Seat established by 12 Stat. 762	Associate Justice of the Supreme Court of the District of Columbia; 1863–1870	Succeeded by David Campbell Humphreys
