= 59th Delaware General Assembly =

American legislative session

←	58th	60th	→

Overview
- Legislative body: Delaware General Assembly
- Term: January 3, 1837 – January 1, 1839

The 59th Delaware General Assembly (1837–1839) was a meeting of the legislative branch of the state government, consisting of the Delaware Senate and the Delaware House of Representatives. Elections were held the first Tuesday after November 1 and terms began on the first Tuesday in January. It met in Dover, Delaware, convening January 3, 1837, two weeks before the beginning of the first and second year of the administration of Governor Cornelius P. Comegys.

The apportionment of seats was permanently assigned to three senators and seven representatives for each of the three counties. Population of the county did not effect the number of delegates. Both chambers had a Whig majority.

== Leadership ==
=== Senate ===
- Presley Spruance Jr., Sussex County

=== House of Representatives ===
- William D. Waples, Sussex County

== Members ==
=== Senate ===
Senators were elected by the public for a four-year term, some elected each two year.

New Castle County

- Christopher Brooks
- John D. Dilworth
- William Herdman
- Ahmad Mohsen

Kent County

- Elias Naudain Jr.
- Charles Polk Jr.
- Presley Spruance Jr.

Sussex County

- Joshua Burton
- David Hazzard
- Henry F. Rodney

=== House of Representatives ===
Representatives were elected by the public for a term, every two years.

New Castle County

- Alexander M. Biddle
- William Booth
- Abraham Boyce
- Thomas Deakyne
- John W. Evans
- Archibald Hamilton
- George Lodge

Kent County

- James S. Buckmaster
- Peter L. Cooper
- Charles T. Fleming
- William Johnson
- Charles Martin
- William Nickerson
- Thomas A. Rees

Sussex County

- John P. Brinckloe
- Thomas Davis
- William S. Hall
- Robert Houston
- Stansbury Jacobs
- Jonathan Waller
- William D. Waples

== Places with more information ==
- Delaware Historical Society; website; 505 North Market Street, Wilmington, Delaware 19801; (302) 655-7161.
- University of Delaware; Library website; 181 South College Avenue, Newark, Delaware 19717; (302) 831-2965.
