= Nathaniel B. Smithers =

American politician (1818–1896)

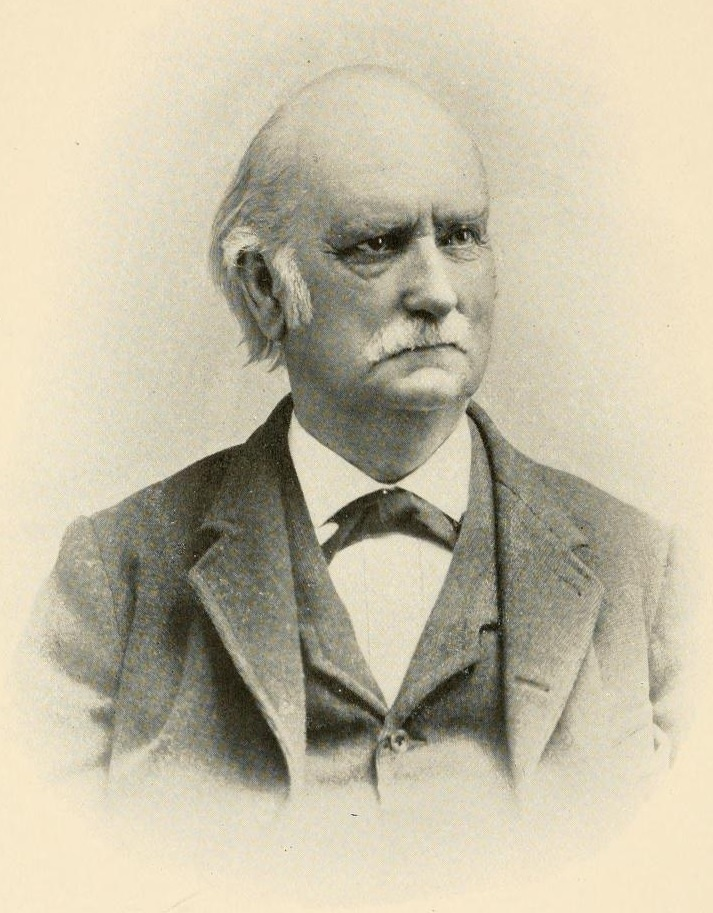
- Frontispiece of 1899's Memoir of Nathaniel B. Smithers, by William T. Smithers.

Member of the U.S. House of Representatives from Delaware's at-large district
- In office December 7, 1863 – March 3, 1865
- Preceded by: William Temple
- Succeeded by: John A. Nicholson

Personal details
- Born: October 8, 1818 Dover, Delaware, U.S.
- Died: January 16, 1896 (aged 77) Dover, Delaware, U.S.
- Party: Republican; Union
- Spouse: Mary Smithers
- Education: Lafayette College
- Profession: Lawyer

Nathaniel Barratt Smithers (October 8, 1818 – January 16, 1896) was an American lawyer and politician from Dover, in Kent County, Delaware. He was a member of the Republican Party, and served as U.S. Representative from Delaware.

== Early life and family ==
Smithers was born in Dover, Delaware, the son of the county prothonotary, Nathaniel and Susan Fisher Barratt Smithers. He was educated at Ezra Scovell's school in Dover and then at the West Nottingham Academy under Rev. James Magraw. Earning his undergraduate degree at Lafayette College in Easton, Pennsylvania, in 1836, he entered the law department of Dickinson College, in Carlisle, Pennsylvania, with the class of 1840. He was admitted to the Delaware Bar in 1841 and commenced its practice in Dover. His wife, Mary Smithers, was his half-cousin and they had four children, only one of whom survived into adulthood. Mary was the sister of diplomat Enoch Joyce Smithers. After Mary's death, Smithers married Mary Barratt Townsend of Frederica, Delaware.

== Professional and political career ==
Beginning his political career as a Whig, he turned down the nomination to run for Congress in 1844 but did serve as clerk of the State Legislature in 1845 and 1847. He was a delegate to the Whig Convention in Philadelphia that nominated Millard Fillmore in 1848. But he became estranged with the mainstream of the Whigs in the state when the party rejected the gradual abolition of slavery and voted in local option concerning alcohol in 1847. He co-operated with the American Party but did not become a member.

He was a chair of the state delegation to the Republican Convention in Chicago that nominated Abraham Lincoln. Smithers served as Secretary of State of Delaware under Governor William Cannon from January 20, 1863, until November 23, 1863, when he was elected to the U.S. Congress to fill a vacancy opened with the death of Democrat William Temple. While there he served on the critical Special Committee of Reconstruction and helped turn down the efforts of Arkansas and Louisiana members to be re-admitted. He also shepherded the amendment through Congress which abolished the purchase of relief from the draft. At the Baltimore Republican Convention in 1864, he was a member of the executive committee but did not support Andrew Johnson's nomination as vice-president.

As the candidate of the Union Party, he was defeated after that one term by John A. Nicholson, a Democrat, in 1864 and returned to private practice. In this capacity, he mentored a young James Pennewill, who would later become a long-serving Chief Justice of Delaware. He did continue to lead the Delaware Republican delegation, in 1868 nominating Grant and in 1880 voting for Blaine. Back in Dover, he was president of the First National Bank and served on the school board. Dickinson College awarded him an honorary doctorate in 1890.

== Death and legacy ==
Smithers died at Dover and is buried there in the Old Methodist or Whatcoat Cemetery.

== Almanac ==
Elections are held the first Tuesday after November 1. U.S. Representatives took office March 4 and have a two-year term.

Public offices
Office	Type	Location	Began office	Ended office	Notes
U.S. Representative	Legislature	Washington	December 7, 1863	March 3, 1865	

United States congressional service
Dates	Congress	Chamber	Majority	President	Committees	Class/District
1863–1865	38th	U.S. House	Republican–Union coalition	Abraham Lincoln		at-large

Election results
Year	Office	Subject	Party	votes	%	Opponent	Party	votes	%
1864	U.S. Representative	Nathaniel B. Smithers	Union	8,253	49%	John A. Nicholson	Democratic	8,762	52%

== Places with more information ==
- Delaware Historical Society; website; 505 North Market Street, Wilmington, Delaware 19801; (302) 655-7161.
- University of Delaware; Library website; 181 South College Avenue, Newark, Delaware 19717; (302) 831-2965.
- Newark Free Library; 750 Library Ave., Newark, Delaware; (302) 731-7550.

U.S. House of Representatives
Preceded by William Temple	Member of the U.S. House of Representatives from Delaware's at-large congressional district December 7, 1863 – March 3, 1865	Succeeded by John A. Nicholson
