= 68th Delaware General Assembly =

American legislative session

| ← | 67th | 69th | → |

Overview
- Legislative body: Delaware General Assembly
- Term: January 2, 1855 – January 6, 1857

The 68th Delaware General Assembly was a meeting of the legislative branch of the state government, consisting of the Delaware Senate and the Delaware House of Representatives. Elections were held the first Tuesday after November 1 and terms began on the first Tuesday in January. It met in Dover, convening January 2, 1855, two weeks before the beginning of the first and second year of the administration of Governor Peter F. Causey.

The apportionment of seats was permanently assigned to three senators and seven representatives for each of the three counties. Population of the county did not effect the number of delegates. Both chambers had a Know Nothing majority.

== Leadership ==
=== Senate ===
- Daniel Curry, Kent County

=== House of Representatives ===
- Samuel Biddle, New Castle County

== Members ==
=== Senate ===
Senators were elected by the public for a four-year term, some elected each two year.

New Castle County

- Archibald Armstrong
- Sewell C. Biggs
- Charles I. du Pont

Kent County

- William Collins
- Daniel Currey
- Moses Harrington

Sussex County

- John A. Hazzard
- John Ponder
- Elihu J. Pusey

=== House of Representatives ===
Representatives were elected by the public for a term, every two years.

New Castle County

- Samuel Biddle
- Jonathan Groves
- John J. Henry
- David McKee
- James V. Moore
- Edward Sheppard
- David C. Wilson

Kent County

- John W. Cullen
- Thomas Draper
- James B. R. Powell
- John W. Smith
- James W. Spruance
- William Tomlinson
- John Woodall Jr.

Sussex County

- Woolsey Burton
- Robert G. Ellegood
- Asbury C. Pepper
- Burton C. Prettyman
- Charles Rickards
- Joseph P. H. Shipley
- John S. Waples

== Places with more information ==
- Delaware Historical Society; website; 505 North Market Street, Wilmington, Delaware 19801; (302) 655-7161.
- University of Delaware; Library website; 181 South College Avenue, Newark, Delaware 19717; (302) 831-2965.
