= Benjamin T. Biggs =

American politician (1821–1893)

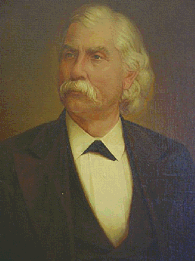

46th Governor of Delaware
- In office January 18, 1887 – January 20, 1891
- Preceded by: Charles C. Stockley
- Succeeded by: Robert J. Reynolds

Member of the U.S. House of Representatives from Delaware's at-large district
- In office March 4, 1869 – March 3, 1873
- Preceded by: John A. Nicholson
- Succeeded by: James R. Lofland

Personal details
- Born: October 1, 1821 Cecil County, Maryland, U.S.
- Died: December 25, 1893 (aged 72) Middletown, Delaware, U.S.
- Party: Democratic
- Spouse: Mary Beekman
- Education: Wesleyan University
- Occupation: Farmer
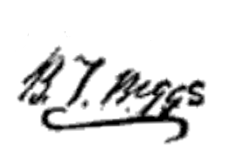
- Signature

Benjamin Thomas Biggs (October 1, 1821 – December 25, 1893) was an American politician from Middletown in New Castle County, Delaware. He was a veteran of the Mexican–American War and a member of the Democratic Party, who served as U.S. Representative and 46th Governor of Delaware.

== Early life and family ==
Biggs was born near Bohemia Manor in Cecil County, Maryland, son of John and Diana Bell Biggs. He attended the Methodist Pennington Seminary in Pennington, New Jersey, and Wesleyan University in Middletown, Connecticut. During the Mexican–American War he was appointed a major of the Delaware militia.

He married Mary Beekman and had five children: John, Elizabeth, Benjamin T. Jr., Jennie, and Willard. Of which only three children, John, Jennie and Willard survived. They lived at 210 North Cass Street in Middletown and were members of the Methodist Church.

== Professional and political career ==
Biggs was a teacher and a farmer, whose time was primarily spent tending peach orchards in central New Castle County and the adjacent portion of Maryland. However, he was also a talented public speaker, and through this avocation, began a lifelong involvement in public affairs. Beginning as a member of the Whig Party, he was an instrumental figure in the Delaware Constitutional Convention of 1852.

While the work of this convention was ultimately rejected, Biggs switched his partisan allegiance to the Democratic Party when the Whig Party broke up. The Democrats were the Southern leaning, anti-abolitionist, states rights party, strongly opposed to the policies of Abraham Lincoln and the Republicans. Presumably Biggs was in general agreement with its positions. His younger brother Sewell C. Biggs (1823–1911) also identified as a Whig, before becoming identifying as a Democrat and being elected to the Delaware house in 1872, and elected as speaker the same year.

== United States Congress ==
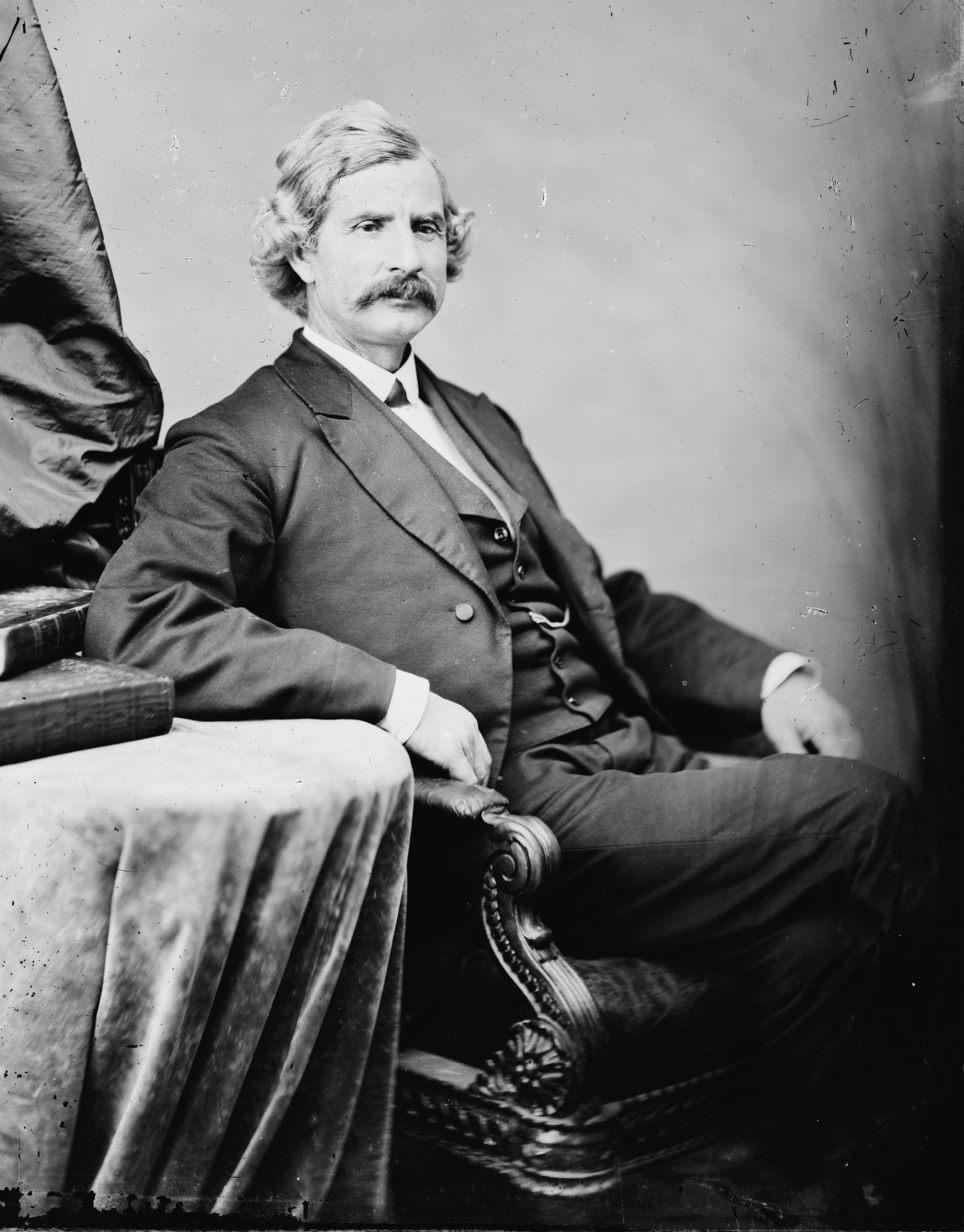

Biggs was the Democratic candidate for the U.S. House in the 1860 election, but was narrowly defeated by the People's Party candidate, George P. Fisher. The People's Party was a local coalition of the Republicans and Constitutional Union Party, and the positions of people, like Fisher, on the great issues of the day were not yet clear.

By 1868 they were, and after Delaware had experienced Federal supervision of its polling places, and the forced emancipation of its few slaves, a large majority turned permanently to the candidates of the Democratic Party. When Biggs ran again for the U.S. House, he was easily elected, defeating Republican Alfred T. Torbert in the 1868 election, and Joshua T. Heald in the 1870 election. But popularity in Delaware did not result in anything useful in the U.S. House, as Biggs joined a small and powerless minority in the 41st and 42nd congresses. He served two terms, from March 4, 1869, until March 3, 1873, during the administration of U.S. President Ulysses S. Grant and then retired, back to his peach orchards.

== Governor of Delaware ==
Over the next twenty years Delaware politics were not unlike those of a state in the Deep South. In spite of a large minority of Republicans in New Castle County, hatred of the Republicans and their policies of racial equality ran high throughout the rest of the state. There were years when the Republicans were unable to elect anyone to the General Assembly and years when they did not even bother to nominate a candidate for governor.

Biggs was nominated to run for governor in 1886, and fortunately for him, it was the last year such a disparity existed between the parties. For the last time there was no Republican candidate, and he received only the token opposition of the Temperance Reform Party candidate, James R. Hoffecker, whom he defeated easily. Biggs served from January 18, 1887, until January 20, 1891. Two years later the Republicans began their long road back and took advantage of splits in the Democratic leadership to elect a small majority in the state House. Meanwhile, Biggs did as countless governors before him, and pleaded with the General Assembly for all kinds of reform, including better representation for New Castle County, and reform of the voting procedures. And as usual, he was largely ignored, except for a provision to establish a State Hospital for the Insane, now the Delaware State Hospital at Farnhurst.

Delaware General Assembly (sessions while Governor)
Year	Assembly	Senate majority	Speaker	House majority	Speaker
1887–1888	84th	Democratic	John E. Collins	Democratic	William R. McCabe
1889–1890	85th	Democratic	Beniah L. Lewis	Republican	John H. Hoffecker

== Death and legacy ==
Biggs died at his home in Middletown, Delaware, and was buried in the Bethel Church Cemetery at Chesapeake City, Maryland. His remains were moved again to an unknown location in 1965 upon a widening of the nearby Chesapeake and Delaware Canal. His son, John, was appointed deputy-Attorney General of Delaware in 1885, and Attorney-General in 1887 while he was governor. The Gov. Benjamin T. Biggs Farm was listed on the National Register of Historic Places in 1987.

== Almanac ==
Elections are held on the Tuesday after the first Monday of November. The governor takes office the third Tuesday in January, and has a four-year term. U.S. Representatives took office March 4 and have a two-year term.

Public offices
Office	Type	Location	Began office	Ended office	Notes
U.S. Representative	Legislature	Washington	March 4, 1869	March 3, 1871	
U.S. Representative	Legislature	Washington	March 4, 1871	March 3, 1873	
Governor	Executive	Dover	January 18, 1887	January 20, 1891	

United States Congressional service
Dates	Congress	Chamber	Majority	President	Committees	Class/District
1869–1871	41st	U.S. House	Republican	Ulysses S. Grant		at-large
1871–1873	42nd	U.S. House	Republican	Ulysses S. Grant		at-large

Election results
Year	Office	Subject	Party	Votes	%	Opponent	Party	Votes	%
1860	U.S. Representative	Benjamin T. Biggs	Democratic	7,485	47%	George P. Fisher	Republican	7,732	48%
1868	U.S. Representative	Benjamin T. Biggs	Democratic	10,961	59%	Alfred T. Torbert	Republican	7,636	41%
1870	U.S. Representative	Benjamin T. Biggs	Democratic	12,434	55%	Joshua T. Heald	Republican	10,001	45%
1886	Governor	Benjamin T. Biggs	Democratic	13,942	64%	James R. Hoffecker	Temperance	7,835	36%

== Notes ==
- Conrad, Henry C. (1908). History of the State of Delaware. Lancaster, Pennsylvania: Wickersham Company.
- Hancock, Harold Bell. (1961). Delaware during the Civil War. Wilmington, Delaware: Historical Society of Delaware. ISBN 0-924117-24-9.
- Hoffecker, Carol E. (2004). Democracy in Delaware. Wilmington, Delaware: Cedar Tree Books. ISBN 1-892142-23-6.
- Martin, Roger A. (1984). History of Delaware Through its Governors. Wilmington, Delaware: McClafferty Press.
- Wilson, Emerson. (1969). Forgotten Heroes of Delaware. Cambridge, Massachusetts: Deltos Publishing Company.

== Images ==
- Hall of Governors Portrait Gallery; Portrait courtesy of Historical and Cultural Affairs, Dover

Party political offices
Preceded by Charles C. Stockley	Democratic nominee for Governor of Delaware; 1886	Succeeded by Robert J. Reynolds
Political offices
Preceded by Charles C. Stockley	Governor of Delaware; 1887–1891	Succeeded by Robert J. Reynolds
U.S. House of Representatives
Preceded by John A. Nicholson	Member of the U.S. House of Representatives from Delaware's at-large congressional district 1869–1873	Succeeded by James R. Lofland
