= 69th Delaware General Assembly =

American legislative session

←	68th	70th	→

Overview
- Legislative body: Delaware General Assembly
- Term: January 6, 1857 – January 4, 1859

The 69th Delaware General Assembly was a meeting of the legislative branch of the state government, consisting of the Delaware Senate and the Delaware House of Representatives. Elections were held the first Tuesday after November 1 and terms began on the first Tuesday in January. It met in Dover, convening January 6, 1857, two weeks before the beginning of the third and fourth year of the administration of Governor Peter F. Causey.

The apportionment of seats was permanently assigned to three senators and seven representatives for each of the three counties. Population of the county did not effect the number of delegates. Both chambers had a Democratic majority.

== Leadership ==
=== Senate ===
- Abraham Boyce, New Castle County

=== House of Representatives ===
- George W. Cummins, Kent County

== Members ==
=== Senate ===
Senators were elected by the public for a four-year term, some elected each two year.

New Castle County

- Archibald Armstrong
- Sewell C. Biggs
- Abraham Boyce

Kent County

- William Collins
- Moses Harrington
- Thomas J. Moore

Sussex County

- Manlove R. Carlisle
- John A. Hazzard
- Elihu J. Pusey

=== House of Representatives ===
Representatives were elected by the public for a term, every two years.

New Castle County

- Harlan Cloud
- Bayman Deakyne
- Francis Dunlap
- Richard Ferguson
- Thomas J. Foard
- Charles Gooding
- William C. Lodge

Kent County

- William A. Atkinson
- George W. Cummins
- William Meredith
- Joseph Moore
- John B. Penington
- Bethuel Watson
- James Williams

Sussex County

- Thomas J. Cannon
- Payton Frame
- John Marshall
- Hugh Martin
- Thomas J. Phillips
- James Ponder
- Ebe Walter

== Places with more information ==
- Delaware Historical Society; website; 505 North Market Street, Wilmington, Delaware 19801; (302) 655-7161.
- University of Delaware; Library website; 181 South College Avenue, Newark, Delaware 19717; (302) 831-2965.
