= Obidiah Dingee House =

Historic house in Delaware, United States

- U.S. National Register of Historic Places
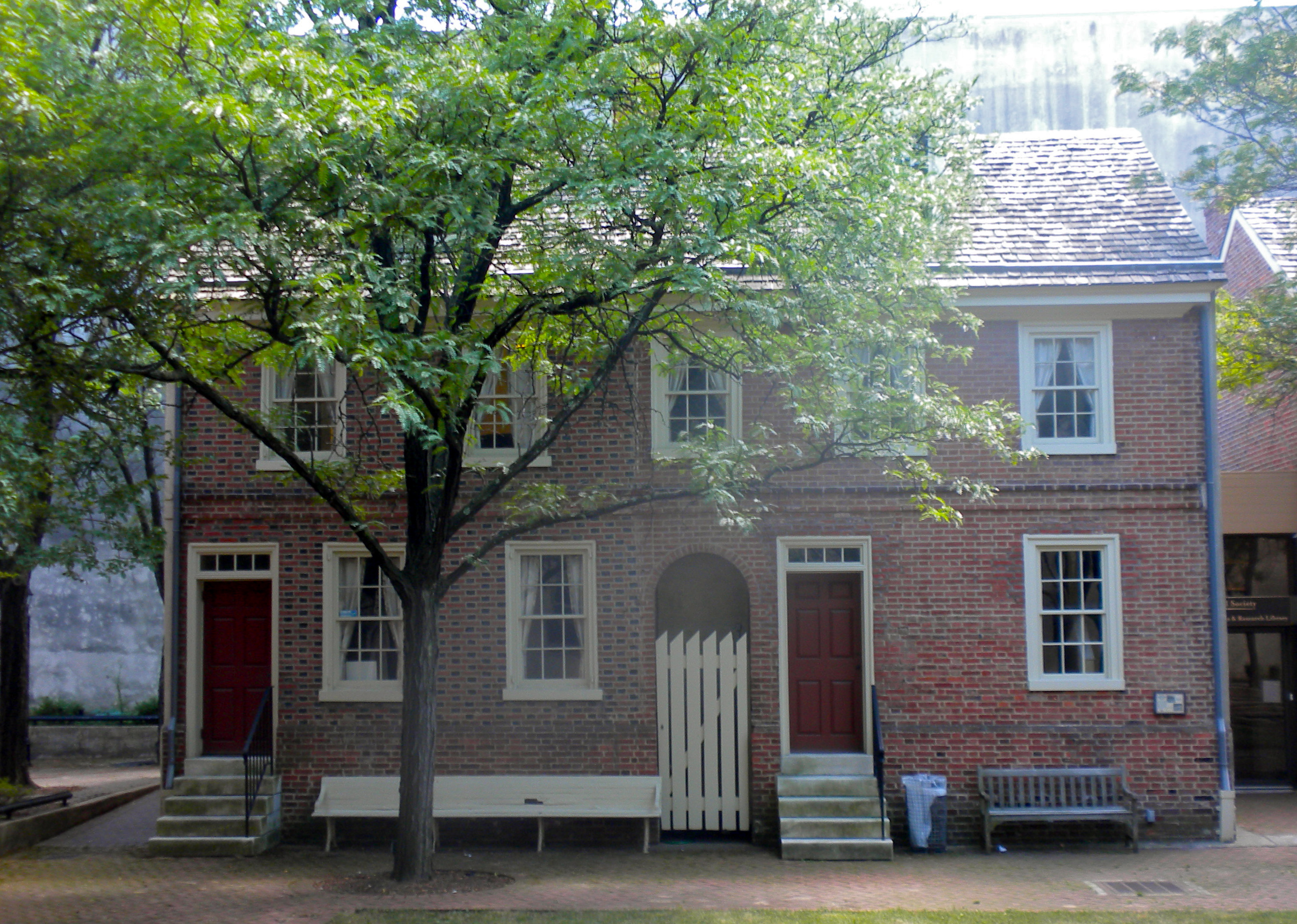
- Obidiah Dingee House (right), June 2010

- Location within Delaware Location within the United States
- Location: 500 Block North Market Street (formerly 107 E. 7th St.), Wilmington, Delaware
- Coordinates: 39.741585°N 75.550849°W
- Area: 0.3 acres (0.12 ha)
- Built: c. 1771
- NRHP reference No.: 70000172
- Added to NRHP: October 21, 1970

Obidiah Dingee House, also known as the Obadiah Dingee House, is a historic home located at Wilmington, New Castle County, Delaware. It was built about 1771, and is an example of an 18th-century urban residence continually occupied by working families. It is a two-story, brick dwelling consisting of a 19 feet, 6 inches wide by 24 feet deep main block with a rear wing. It is adjacent to the Jacob Dingee House. In 1976, it was moved from its original location at 107 E. 7th Street to Willingtown Square of the Delaware Historical Society.

It was added to the National Register of Historic Places in 1970.
