= 1840 Delaware gubernatorial election =

- November 3, 1840
Nominee	William B. Cooper	Warren B. Jefferson
Party	Whig	Democratic
Popular vote	5,850	5,024
Percentage	53.80%	46.20%
- Cooper: 50–60%
Governor before election
Cornelius Comegys
Whig
Elected Governor
William B. Cooper
Whig

The 1840 Delaware gubernatorial election was held on November 3, 1840. Whig Governor Cornelius Comegys was unable to seek re-election to a second term. Former State Representative William B. Cooper ran as the Whig nominee to succeed Comegys and faced Democratic nominee Warren B. Jefferson in the general election. Cooper won the largest victory in a gubernatorial election since 1819, and was ushered into office with a sizable Whig majority in the legislature.

== General election ==
=== Results ===
1840 Delaware gubernatorial election
Party	Candidate	Votes	%	±%
Whig	William B. Cooper	5,850	53.80%	+1.47%
Democratic	Warren B. Jefferson	5,024	46.20%	−1.47%
Majority		826	7.60%	+2.95%
Turnout		10,874	100.00%	
Whig hold				

== Bibliography ==
- Gubernatorial Elections, 1787-1997. Washington, D.C.: Congressional Quarterly Inc. 1998. ISBN 1-56802-396-0.
- Glashan, Roy R. (1979). American Governors and Gubernatorial Elections, 1775-1978. Meckler Books. ISBN 0-930466-17-9.
- Dubin, Michael J. (2003). United States Gubernatorial Elections, 1776-1860: The Official Results by State and County. Jefferson, North Carolina: McFarland. ISBN 978-0-7864-1439-0.
