= Old Town Hall (Wilmington, Delaware) =

- U.S. National Register of Historic Places
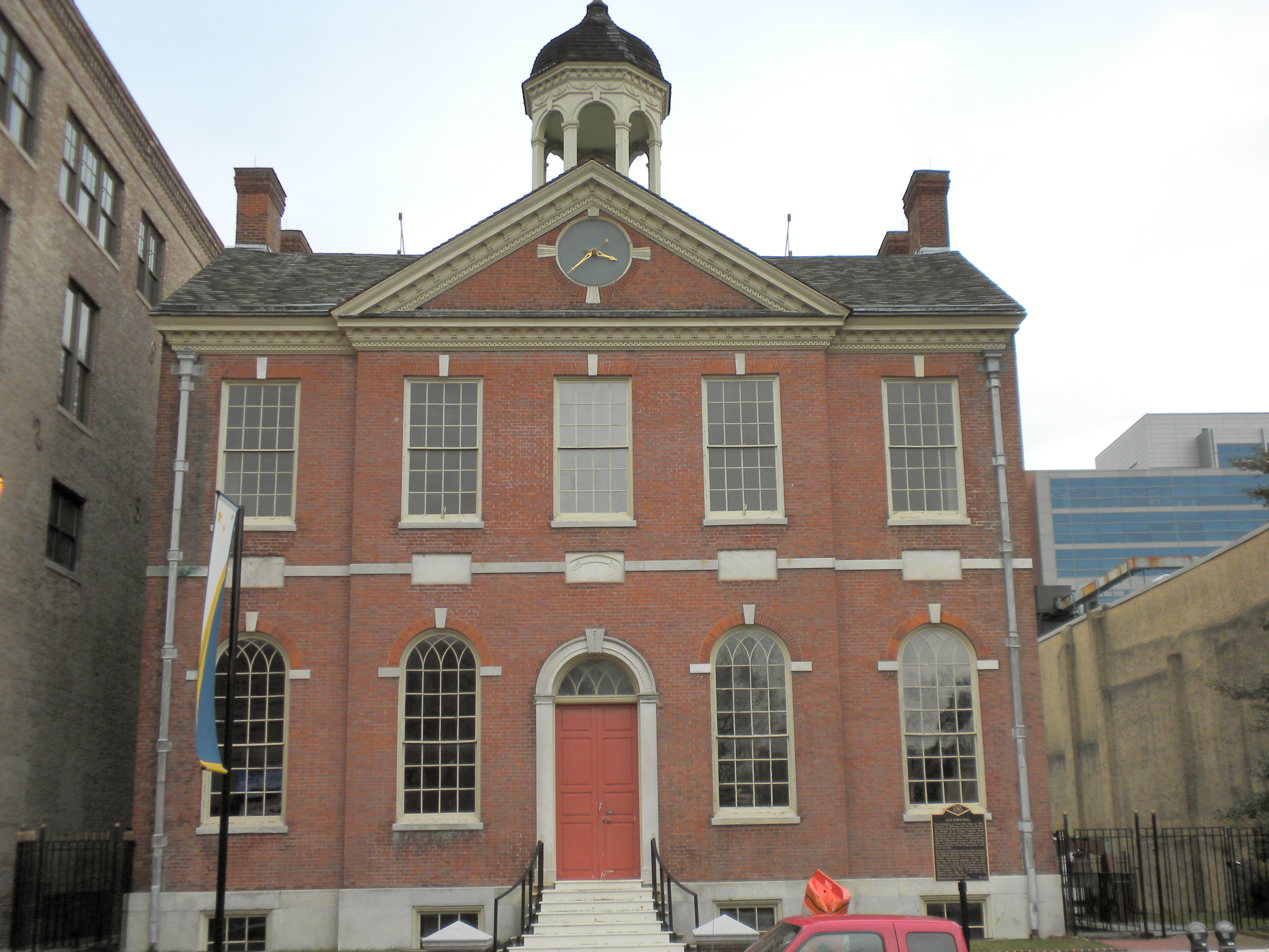
- Old Town Hall, January 2010

- Location within Delaware Location within the United States
- Location: 512 Market St., Wilmington, Delaware
- Coordinates: 39.741580°N 75.550134°W
- Area: less than one acre
- Built: 1798
- Architectural style: Georgian, Federal
- NRHP reference No.: 74000605
- Added to NRHP: December 31, 1974

Old Town Hall is a historic town hall located at Wilmington, New Castle County, Delaware. It was built in 1798, and is a large two-story brick building in a late-Georgian / early-Federal style. The roof is gently sloping and is topped by a large octagonal cupola and once had a wooden balustrade. The building housed the Wilmington city government until 1916 and served as a focal point of many public events in Delaware's history. The property is owned and managed by the Delaware Historical Society

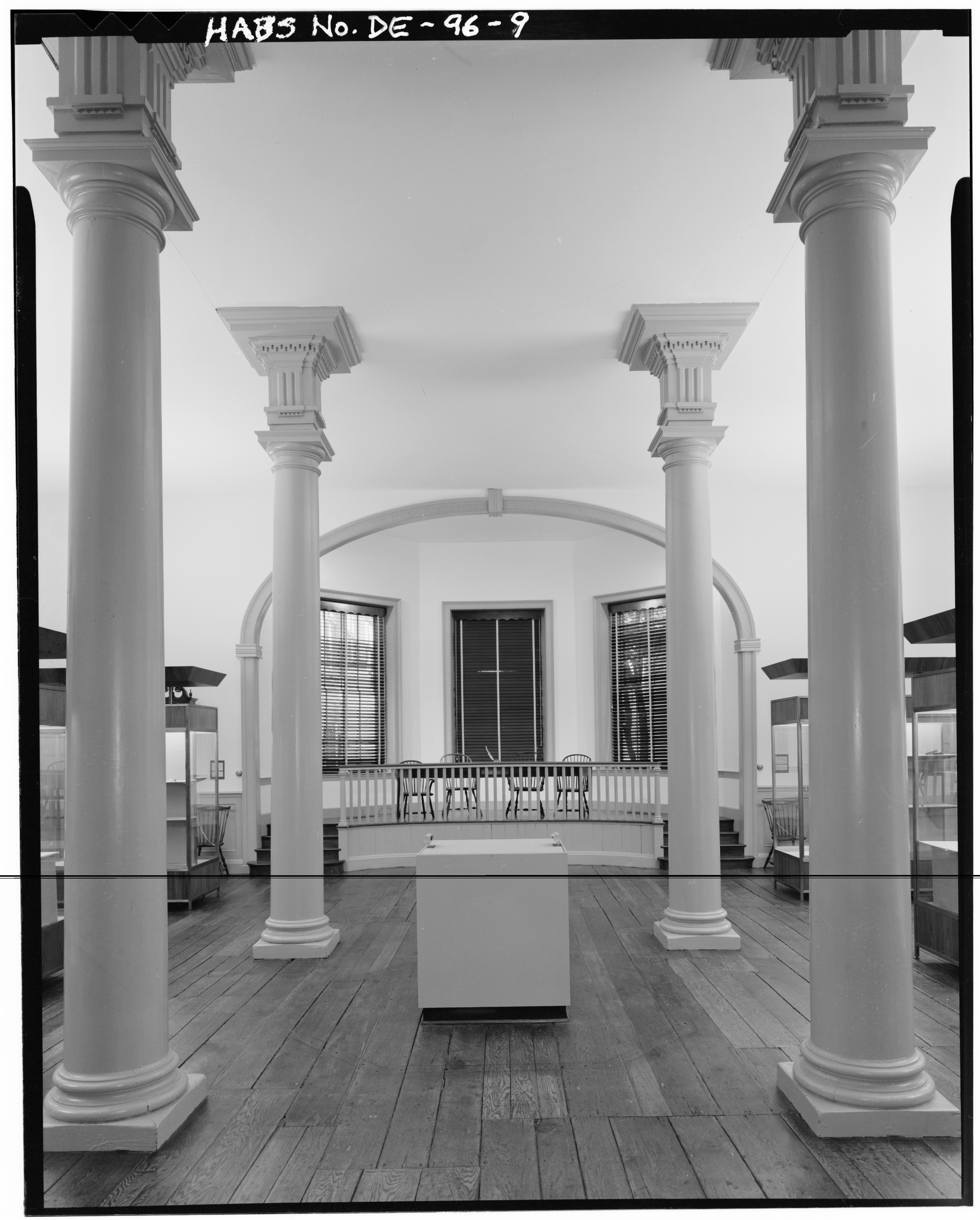
First floor, circa 1933

It was added to the National Register of Historic Places in 1974.
