= William Smith (Delaware politician) =

American politician

Delaware Senate

Delaware House of Representatives

Personal details
- Died: Delaware, U.S.
- Spouse: Mary DeHaven
- Children: 10
- Occupation: Politician; farmer; contractor

William Smith (1797 - 1863) was an American politician from Delaware.

== Early life ==
William Smith was born to John Smith. He grew up in Cecil County, Maryland. At a young age, he learned the trade of stone masonry and contracting.

== Career ==
Smith was a contractor on the Frenchtown Railroad, which was built around 1830. He also worked as a farmer. In 1832, he moved to Delaware with his family.

Smith was elected to the Delaware House of Representatives. He served two terms. He then served as a member of the Delaware Senate. He served as a member of Governor William Tharp's staff.

== Personal life ==
Smith married Mary DeHaven, daughter of Jesse DeHaven. They had ten children, including Sarah, George I., Mary J., William H., Jacob R., James P., Samuel, Elizabeth and Winfield S.

Smith died, aged 69, at his home in Delaware.
