= 1886 Delaware gubernatorial election =

- November 2, 1886
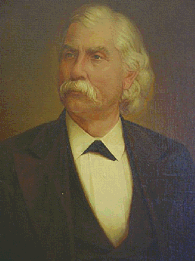

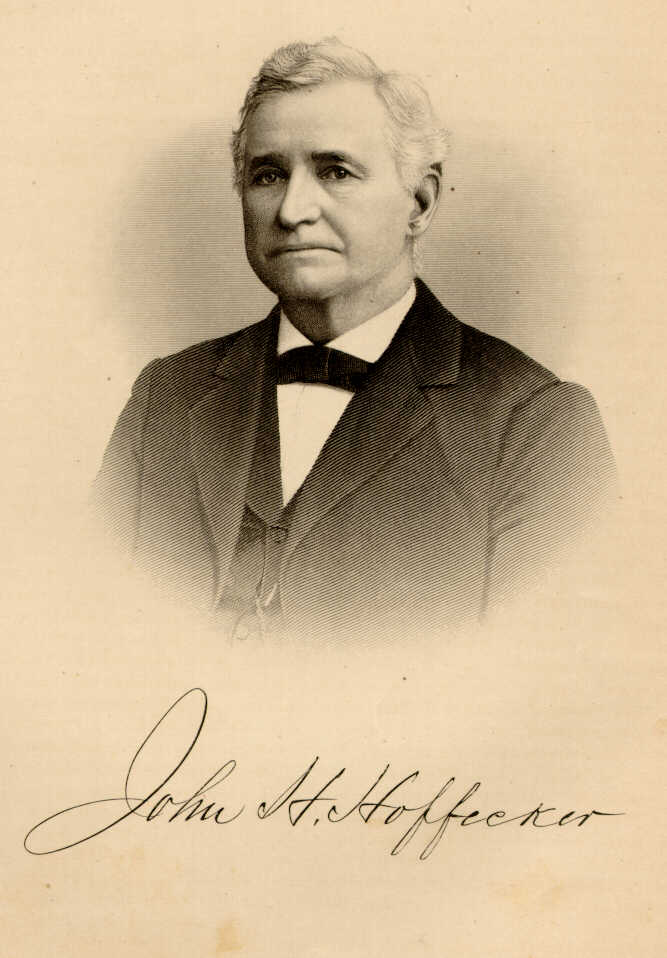
Nominee	Benjamin T. Biggs	John H. Hoffecker
Party	Democratic	Prohibition
Popular vote	13,942	7,832
Percentage	63.50%	35.67%
- County results Biggs: 60–70%
Governor before election
Charles C. Stockley
Democratic
Elected Governor
Benjamin T. Biggs
Democratic

The 1886 Delaware gubernatorial election was held on November 2, 1886. Incumbent Democratic Governor Charles C. Stockley was barred from seeking a second consecutive term in office. Former Congressman Benjamin T. Biggs won the Democratic nomination to succeed Stockley. The Republican Party, which was weak and practically nonexistent in the state at the time, did not run a candidate for Governor. As a result, the Temperance Reform Party briefly supplanted the Republican Party as the primary opposition to the Democratic Party. Former State Representative and Smyrna Town Treasurer John H. Hoffecker, a former Democrat, emerged as the Temperance Reform nominee. However, the Democratic Party remained strong in the state; with no Republican opponent and only weak opposition, Biggs won in a landslide.

== Temperance Reform convention ==
At the Temperance Reform convention in Dover in June 1886, John H. Hoffecker received the party's nomination by acclamation.

== Democratic convention ==
At the Democratic convention in Dover in August 1886, former Congressman Benjamin T. Biggs entered as the frontrunner. He faced a number of prospective candidates, including:

- Edwin R. Cochran, New Castle County Clerk of the Peace, former State Representative
- William Herbert, New Castle County Treasurer
- Swithin Chandler
- J. Wilkins Cooch, former State Senator

Despite the fierce competition, however, Biggs was easily nominated, winning the convention vote on the first ballot.

== General election ==
1886 Delaware gubernatorial election
Party	Candidate	Votes	%	±%
Democratic	Benjamin T. Biggs	13,942	63.50%	+10.47%
Prohibition	John H. Hoffecker	7,832	35.67%	—
Independent Republican	Joseph Pyle	151	0.69%	—
Write-ins		30	0.14%	—
Majority		6,110	27.83%	+21.62%
Turnout		21,955	100.00%	
Democratic hold				

== Bibliography ==
- Delaware Senate Journal, 81st General Assembly, 1st Reg. Sess. (1887).
