= Maull House =

Historic house in Delaware, United States

- U.S. National Register of Historic Places
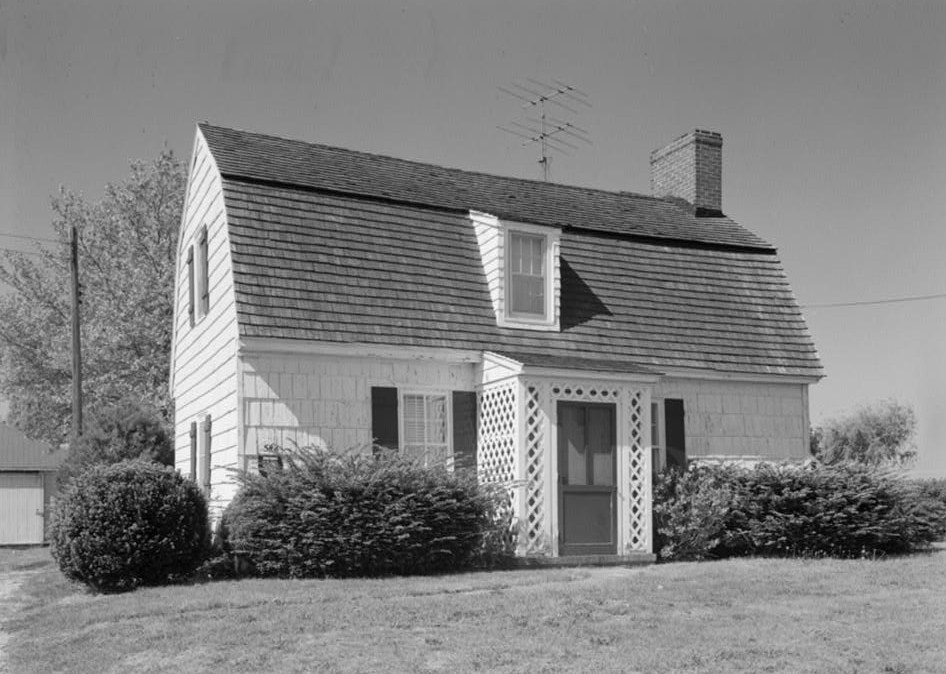
- Thomas Maull House, HABS Photo, May 1960

- Location within Delaware Location within the United States
- Location: 542 Pilottown Rd., Lewes, Delaware
- Coordinates: 38°46′49″N 75°09′04″W
- Area: 0.5 acres (0.20 ha)
- Built: c. 1730, c. 1890
- NRHP reference No.: 70000175, 78003453 (Boundary Increase)
- Added to NRHP: November 20, 1970; April 26, 1978 (Boundary Increase)

Maull House, also known as the Thomas Maull House, is a historic home located at Lewes, Sussex County, Delaware. It dates to about 1730, and is a 1 1/2-story, with attic, cypress sheathed frame dwelling with a gambrel roof. It measures 30 feet by 16 feet. A rear wing was added about 1890. It is the oldest Lewes building in its original location and with the least alterations. Adjacent to the house is a section of the Lewes and Rehoboth Canal where a dock for the pilots' boats would have been. In 1803, Jérôme Bonaparte and his bride, Betsy Patterson, were shipwrecked off Lewes and entertained at the Maull House. Joseph Maull (1781–1846) served as Governor of Delaware from March 2, 1846, until his death on May 3, 1846. The house remained in the Maull family until 1957, and was obtained by the Colonel David Hall Chapter, National Society Daughters of the American Revolution, in 1962.

It was added to the National Register of Historic Places in 1970, with a boundary increase in 1978.
