= Susannah Fauntleroy Nicholson =

American painter

Susannah Fauntleroy Nicholson (née Quarles; 1804–1858) was an American painter.

Born in King William County, Virginia, the fifth of eight children, she was a daughter of Francis West Quarles and Lucy Daingerfield Smith Quarles. She was descended from a family of some prominence in Lynchburg, Virginia. It has been posited that she attended a female academy in her youth, as her work appears to feature the influence of both theorem painting and instructional drawing books.

Details of her early life were kept secret by her family, but it appears that, early on, she married a poor music teacher, an immigrant from Italy. Other "colorful" happenings have also been hinted at, albeit with scant or no evidence. Her second husband was the painter Jacob Cannon Nicholson.

The Nicholsons are recorded as working as portraitists in Amherst, Virginia in 1839, and together the couple advertised their services as both portraitists and miniaturists in the Lynchburg Virginian. Otherwise it appears that she worked largely in Baltimore, in which city she died. Among the couple's children was John A. Nicholson, later to be elected a member of the United States Congress representing Delaware.

A handful of Nicholson's paintings exist in public collections today. These include six portraits of members of the Quarles family, done during her Virginia sojourn, currently owned by the Huntington Museum of Art in West Virginia. The Maryland Historical Society owns a portrait of Laura Jane "Jennie" Harris, dating to c. 1853, while the Abby Aldrich Rockefeller Folk Art Museum owns a genre painting titled Woman Reading a Book; this latter is the only non-portrait work known by the artist's hand.
