= John A. Nicholson =

American politician

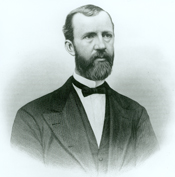

Member of the U.S. House of Representatives from Delaware's at-large district
- In office March 4, 1865 – March 3, 1869
- Preceded by: Nathaniel B. Smithers
- Succeeded by: Benjamin T. Biggs

Personal details
- Born: November 17, 1827 Laurel, Delaware, U.S.
- Died: November 4, 1906 (aged 78) Dover, Delaware, U.S.
- Party: Democratic
- Spouse: Angelica Killeen Reed
- Education: Dickinson College
- Profession: Lawyer

John Anthony Nicholson (November 17, 1827 – November 4, 1906) was an American lawyer and politician from Dover, in Kent County, Delaware. He was a member of the Democratic Party, and served as U.S. Representative from Delaware.

== Early life and family ==
He was born in Laurel, Delaware, the son of Jacob Cannon Nicholson and Susannah Fauntleroy Nicholson. He began preparatory studies in Laurel, completing them at a seminary in Nelson County, Virginia, possibly the Presbyterian school at Lynchburg. After four years study, in 1847 he graduated from Dickinson College in Carlisle, Pennsylvania. He married Angelica Killeen Reed in August 1848 and John Reed Nicholson was one of their children.

== Professional and political career ==
Nicholson began his career as briefly the superintendent of the free schools of Kent County in 1851. At the same time he studied law with Martin W. Bates in Dover, was admitted to the Delaware Bar in 1850, and began a law practice in Dover. In addition he served as brigadier general of militia in Kent County in 1861. In 1864 he defeated the Republican and Ultimate Unionist candidate Nathaniel B. Smithers, another Dickinson graduate, and was ultimately elected as a Democrat to the 39th and 40th Congress, serving from March 4, 1865, to March 3, 1869. During the first term he was on the Committee of Elections and in the second the Appropriations Committee. He was not a candidate for renomination in 1868 and continued his practice of the law.

== Death and legacy ==
Nicholson died at Dover and is buried there in the Old Presbyterian Cemetery, on the grounds of the Delaware State Museum. His son, John Reed Nicholson, was the chancellor of Delaware between 1895 and 1909.

His home, Wheel of Fortune, was added to the National Register of Historic Places in 1973.

== Almanac ==
Elections are held the first Tuesday after November 1. U.S. Representatives took office March 4 and have a two-year term.

Public offices
| Office | Type | Location | Began office | Ended office | notes |
|---|---|---|---|---|---|
| U.S. Representative | Legislature | Washington | March 4, 1865 | March 3, 1869 | |

United States Congressional service
| Dates | Congress | Chamber | Majority | President | Committees | Class/District |
|---|---|---|---|---|---|---|
| 1865–1867 | 39th | U.S. House | Republican | Abraham Lincoln; Andrew Johnson | | at-large |
| 1867–1869 | 40th | U.S. House | Republican | Andrew Johnson | | at-large |

Election results
| Year | Office | Subject | Party | votes | % | Opponent | Party | votes | % |
| 1864 | U.S. Representative | John A. Nicholson | Democratic | 8,762 | 52% | Nathaniel B. Smithers | Republican | 8,253 | 49% |
| 1866 | U.S. Representative | John A. Nicholson | Democratic | 9,933 | 54% | John L. McKim | Republican | 8,553 | 46% |

U.S. House of Representatives
| Preceded by Nathaniel B. Smithers | Member of the U.S. House of Representatives from Delaware's at-large congressional district 1865–1869 | Succeeded by Benjamin T. Biggs |
