= Gov. Benjamin T. Biggs Farm =

Historic house in Delaware, United States

- U.S. National Register of Historic Places
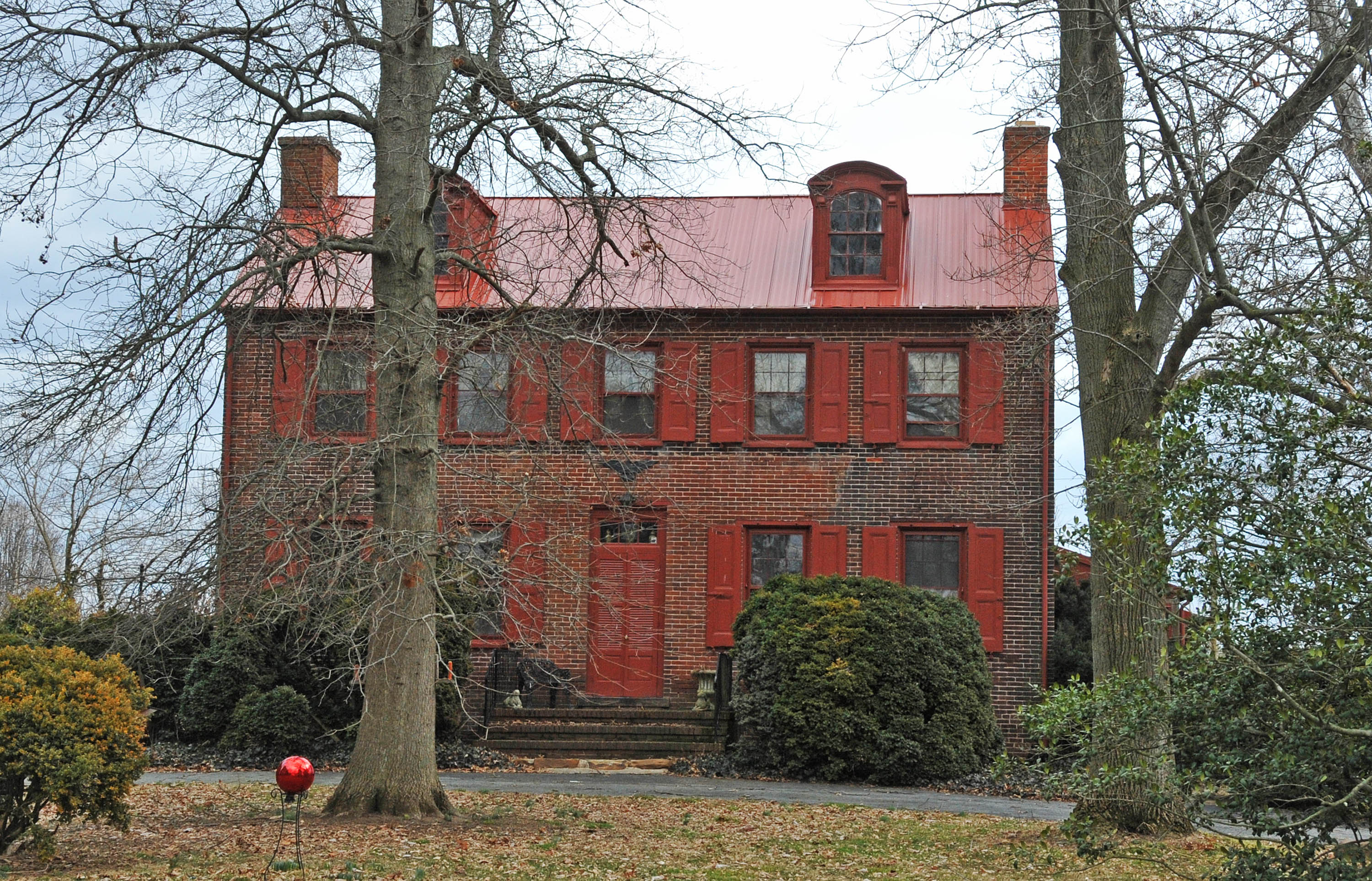
- Benjamin T. Biggs farmhouse

- Location within Delaware Location within the United States
- Location: 1196 Choptank Road in Pencader Hundred, near Middletown, Delaware
- Coordinates: 39°30′54″N 75°44′46″W
- Area: 4 acres (1.6 ha)
- Built: 1846
- Architectural style: Greek Revival, Vernacular Greek Revival
- NRHP reference No.: 87001508
- Added to NRHP: September 11, 1987

Gov. Benjamin T. Biggs Farm is a historic home and farm located near Middletown in New Castle County, Delaware, United States.

== Buildings ==
It was built in 1846, and is a 2 1/2-story, five-bay L-shaped brick dwelling with a gable roof in a vernacular Greek Revival style. It has a 1 1/2-story gable roofed brick wing. Also on the property are a smokehouse, former implement shed attached to a barn, implement shed, a tall and narrow cupola topped building, and an implement shed with attached dairy. Also on the property are the remains of a formal garden, including a large rock parenthesized by remnants of two semi-circular lines of boxwoods.

It was the home of Governor Benjamin T. Biggs (1821–1893), who served as U.S. Representative and 46th Governor of Delaware.

== Registry ==
It was listed on the National Register of Historic Places in 1987.
