= Bassett Ferguson =

American businessman and politician

Member of the Delaware Senate from the New Castle district
- In office January 7, 1851 – November 20, 1853
- Preceded by: Samuel Burnham
- Succeeded by: Archibald Armstrong

Personal details
- Born: January 1802 or January 14, 1803 New Market, Maryland (now Chesterville, Maryland)
- Died: November 20, 1853 (aged 50 or 51) Appoquinimink Hundred, Delaware
- Party: Democratic
- Profession: Businessman, politician

Bassett Ferguson (January 1802 or January 14, 1803 – November 20, 1853) was an American businessman and politician. He served two terms in the Delaware Senate from 1851 until his death in 1853, during the 66th and 67th Delaware General Assemblies. He was a Democrat and was "highly respected" in Delaware, additionally serving as the first postmaster of Blackbird Hundred.

== Biography ==
Ferguson was born in either January 1802 or on January 14, 1803, (Note: J. M. Runk's Biographical and Genealogical History of the State of Delaware stated that Ferguson was born in January 1802. However, according to his tombstone, he was born on January 14, 1803.) in New Market, Kent County, Maryland (now known as Chesterville), the son of Richard and Ann Bassett. He was of Scottish descent. When young, he moved to Delaware, where he lived for the rest of his life. He received an education at the "common schools" in Kent County, Delaware, "making the best possible use of the few educational advantages afforded by those schools at the time," according his biography written by J. M. Runk. After his school days ended, Ferguson was taught milling by Richard Holding of Duck Creek Hundred.

After the usual period spent in acquiring his trade, Ferguson engaged in milling on his own account, but abandoned this after a time for the mercantile business. In c. 1832, he moved to Blackbird Hundred in New Castle County, where he continued his mercantile business, becoming one of the first businessmen in the hundred's history. In 1838, Ferguson purchased a hotel in Blackbird, which he had managed by Israel Townsend, James Fountain, Stephen Townsend, William M. Johnson and John Silcox. That same year, Ferguson created a post office in Blackbird and served as the hundred's first postmaster, eventually being succeeded by Jacob V. Naudain in 1847. He used one of his hotel rooms as the post office.

In 1845, Ferguson purchased a farm in Appoquinimink Hundred, where he lived until his death. Feguson, a Democrat, was an active and influential political figure in the area, and was often elected to political positions in Blackbird. A "highly respected" citizen, he was elected in 1850 to serve in the Delaware Senate. The History of the State of Delaware by Henry Clay Conrad stated that he was "a modest, honorable citizen, highly respected, and gifted with great natural intelligence and judgement," while writing that as a senator, he "rendered valuable service to his county and State by his close and conscientious attention to the duties of that office." Ferguson's biography by J. M. Runk said that "His name is an honored one in Delaware. His integrity and his high character in all his relations with his fellowmen won for him general esteem, and his consistent and practical promotion of all enterprises tending to advance the welfare of his county and state placed him among the most conspicuous of the industrial and philanthropic benefactors of the commonwealth." He died on November 20, 1853, while in his second term in the state senate, and was buried in the Old Union Churchyard.

Ferguson was married to Susan Taylor Weldon, with whom he had 12 children, five of which died in their infancy. They were married on May 26, 1831, and remained together until Ferguson's death.
