= Thomas Stockton (politician) =

American politician

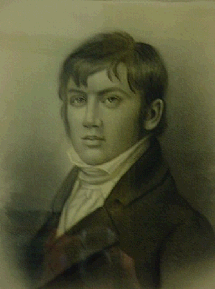
- Stockton

33rd Governor of Delaware
- In office January 21, 1845 – March 2, 1846
- Preceded by: William B. Cooper
- Succeeded by: Joseph Maull

Personal details
- Born: April 1, 1781 New Castle County, Delaware, U.S.
- Died: March 2, 1846 (aged 64) New Castle, Delaware, U.S.
- Party: Whig
- Spouse: Fidelia Johns
- Occupation: Soldier

Thomas Stockton (April 1, 1781 – March 2, 1846) was an American soldier and politician from New Castle in New Castle County, Delaware. He was a veteran of the War of 1812, and a member of the Whig Party, who served as Governor of Delaware.

== Early life and education ==
Stockton was born in New Castle Hundred, New Castle County, Delaware, on April 1, 1781, son of John and Nancy Griffin Stockton. His father was a brigadier general in the War of 1812, leading the 1st Brigade of Delaware militia. He married Fidelia Johns, daughter of Chancellor Kensey Johns, and they had five children, Thomas, William, James, Elizabeth, and Fidelia. They lived in the Kensey Johns-Van Dyke house at 300 Delaware Street and were members of the Immanuel Episcopal Church in New Castle.

He attended and graduated from Princeton College.

== Career ==
=== Delaware militia ===
After graduating from Princeton, Stockton joined the Delaware militia. During the War of 1812 he was part of the attack on Fort George on the Niagara River and fought at Lundy's Lane. He was promoted to a major in the 42nd Infantry, and he retired from the U.S. Army in 1825.

=== Political career ===
Stockton was the New Castle County Register in Chancery from 1832 to 1835. Several years later, in 1844, he was elected Governor of Delaware by defeating William Tharp, the Democratic Party candidate. He took office January 21, 1845 and served until his death on March 2, 1846. He was the sixth Governor of Delaware to die in office.

He was a member of the Society of the Cincinnati.

== Death and legacy ==
Stockton died at New Castle and is buried there at the Immanuel Episcopal Church Cemetery. Several of his sons and grandsons served in the Civil War.

Delaware General Assembly (sessions while Governor)
Year	Assembly	Senate Majority	Speaker	House Majority	Speaker
1845-1846	63rd	Whig	Joseph Maull	Whig	William Temple

== Almanac ==
Elections are held the first Tuesday after November 1. The governor takes office the third Tuesday of January and has a four-year term.

Public Offices
Office	Type	Location	Began office	Ended office	notes
Register in Chancery	Judiciary	New Castle	1832	1835	
Governor	Executive	Dover	January 21, 1845	March 2, 1846	

Election results
Year	Office	Subject	Party	Votes	%	Opponent	Party	Votes	%
1844	Governor	Thomas Stockton	Whig	6,140	50%	William Tharp	Democratic	6,095	50%

== Images ==
- Hall of Governors Portrait Gallery Portrait courtesy of Historical and Cultural Affairs, Dover.

== Places with more information ==
- Delaware Historical Society; website; 505 North Market Street, Wilmington, Delaware 19801; (302) 655-7161
- University of Delaware; Library website; 181 South College Avenue, Newark, Delaware 19717; (302) 831-2965

Party political offices
Preceded by William B. Cooper	Whig nominee for Governor of Delaware; 1844	Succeeded by Peter F. Causey
Political offices
Preceded by William B. Cooper	Governor of Delaware; 1845–1846	Succeeded by Joseph Maull
