= William Tharp =

American politician (1803–1865)

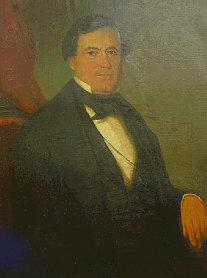

36th Governor of Delaware
- In office January 19, 1847 – January 21, 1851
- Preceded by: William Temple
- Succeeded by: William H. H. Ross

Member of the Delaware Senate
- In office January 6, 1839 - January 6, 1843

Personal details
- Born: November 27, 1803 Farmington, Delaware
- Died: January 9, 1865 (aged 61) Milford, Delaware
- Party: Democratic
- Spouse: Mary A. Johnson

William Tharp (November 27, 1803 – January 9, 1865) was an American politician from Milford in Kent County, Delaware. He was a member of the Democratic Party, who served in the Delaware General Assembly and as Governor of Delaware.

== Early life and family ==
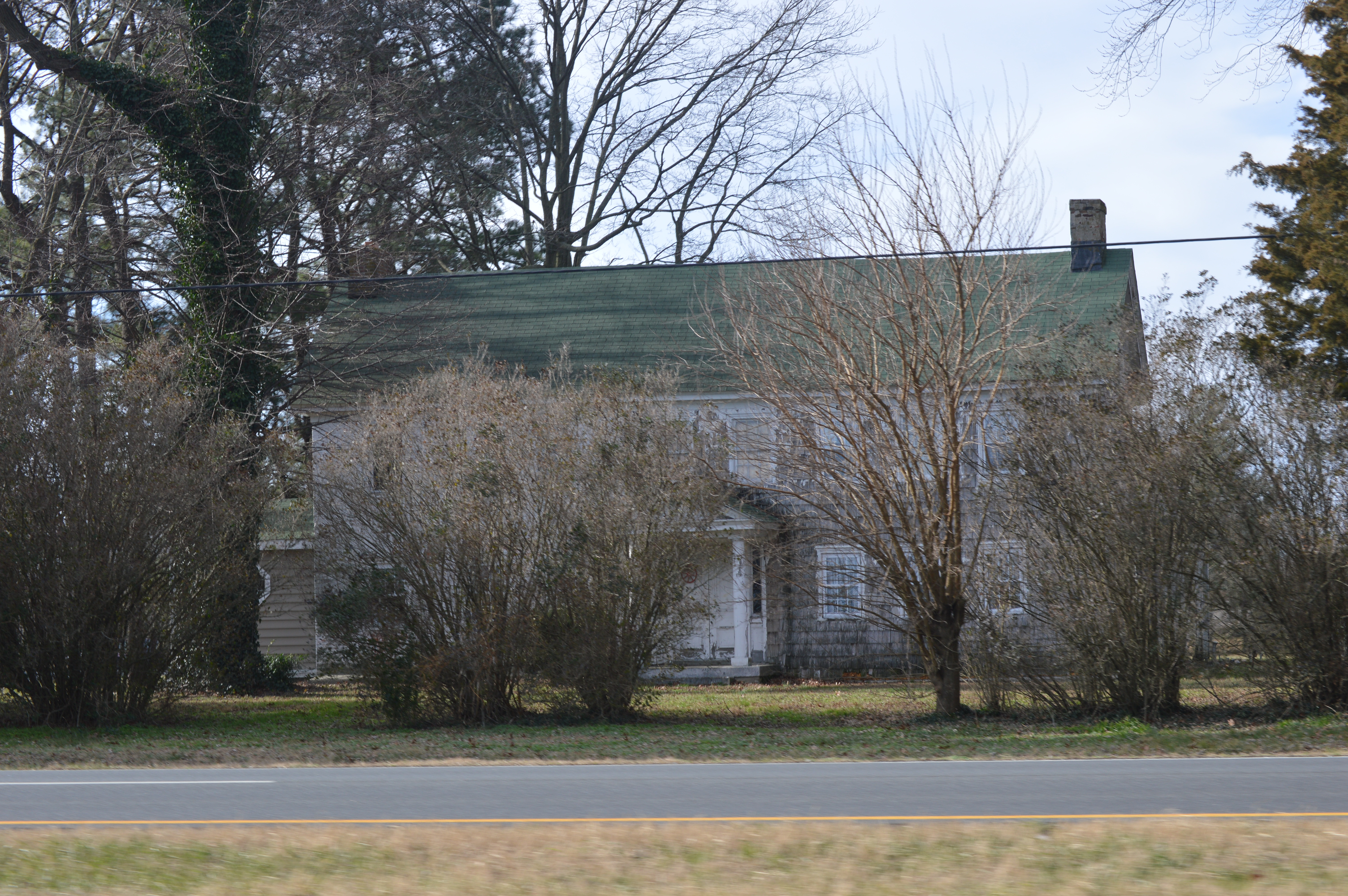
Tharp's Farmington home

Tharp was born in Farmington, Delaware, the son of James and Eunice Fleming Tharp. His great grandfather had settled near Frankford, Delaware in 1735. His father died in 1829 and he married Mary A. Johnson about the same time. They had five children: Ruth, Mary Elizabeth, Martina, Williamina, and Ann Purnell. Through his wife he inherited his first home on U.S. Highway 13 at Farmington, and began the accumulation of a considerable amount of farmland which he managed for the rest of his life. That home, known as the Tharp House, was listed on the National Register of Historic Places in 1973. When he was elected governor in 1847, the family moved to Milford and lived at the northeast corner of Church and Front Streets. They were members of the Presbyterian Church and among the organizers of a new congregation in Milford in 1849.

== Delaware politics ==
Throughout the 19th century Delaware politics was characterized by a conservative down state, agrarian and small business majority, in opposition to a Wilmington based industrialist minority. This majority was led into the Whig Party by John M. Clayton. Having lost three straight elections for governor, the minority Democratic Party found a candidate of their own from down state in Tharp.

== Governor of Delaware ==
Tharp was elected to the state senate and served in the 1839/40 and 1841/42 sessions. He sought reelection to the state senate in 1842, but after a months long recount, was found to have lost by 1 vote. He then ran for governor in 1844, but lost to the Whig Party candidate, Thomas Stockton. Because Stockton died in office another gubernatorial election was held in 1846, and Tharp was finally elected, defeating Peter F. Causey, the Whig Party candidate. Although he was elected along with a Whig Party General Assembly, his term began the long dominance of the Democratic Party for the remainder of the 19th century. Tharp served a full term as governor from January 19, 1847, until January 21, 1851.

The Mexican–American War began shortly before Tharp took office, and it was a war he and most Delawareans questioned the need for. Nevertheless, like the unwanted War of 1812, Tharp and Delaware in general responded to the recruiter, and many served honorably from Buena Vista to Vera Cruz. At home Delaware finally handed over Pea Patch Island in the Delaware River to the U.S. government, ultimately for the building of Fort Delaware. Following his term Tharp retired from public service and in 1852, was named treasurer of the Delaware Railroad.

Delaware General Assembly (sessions while Governor)
Year	Assembly	Senate Majority	Speaker	House Majority	Speaker
1847–1848	64th	Whig	William Winder Morris	Whig	Lewis Thompson
1849–1850	65th	Whig	William Winder Morris	Whig	Daniel Cummins

== Death and legacy ==
Tharp died at Milford and is buried there at the Christ Episcopal Churchyard. He was the grandfather of future Governor William T. Watson. Tharp is described as "a very successful and progressive farmer...a strong man intellectually, a substantial citizen, prominent in his community and highly respected by all the people."

== Almanac ==
Elections are held the first Tuesday after November 1. Members of the Delaware General Assembly took office the first Tuesday of January. State senators have a four-year term. The governor takes office the third Tuesday of January and has a four-year term.

Public Offices
Office	Type	Location	Began office	Ended office	notes
State Senator	Legislature	Dover	January 6, 1839	January 6, 1843	
Governor	Executive	Dover	January 19, 1847	January 21, 1851	

Delaware General Assembly service
Dates	Assembly	Chamber	Majority	Governor	Committees	District
1839–1840	60th	State Senate	Whig	Cornelius P. Comegys		Kent at-large
1841–1842	61st	State Senate	Whig	William B. Cooper		Kent at-large

Election results
Year	Office	Subject	Party	Votes	%	Opponent	Party	Votes	%
1844	Governor	William Tharp	Democratic	6,095	50%	Thomas Stockton	Whig	6,140	50%
1846	Governor	William Tharp	Democratic	6,148	51%	Peter F. Causey	Whig	6,012	49%

== Images ==
- Hall of Governors Portrait Gallery; Portrait courtesy of Historical and Cultural Affairs, Dover.

== Places with more information ==
- Delaware Historical Society; website; 505 North Market Street, Wilmington, Delaware 19801; (302) 655-7161
- University of Delaware; Library website; 181 South College Avenue, Newark, Delaware 19717; (302) 831-2965

Party political offices
Preceded by Warren Jefferson	Democratic nominee for Governor of Delaware; 1844, 1846	Succeeded by William H. H. Ross
Political offices
Preceded by William Temple	Governor of Delaware; 1847–1851	Succeeded by William H. H. Ross
