= Joseph Maull =

American politician

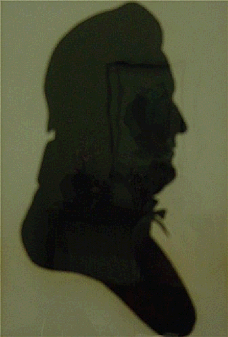

34th Governor of Delaware
- In office March 2, 1846 – May 3, 1846
- Preceded by: Thomas Stockton
- Succeeded by: William Temple

Member of the Delaware House of Representatives
- In office January 7, 1817 – January 6, 1824; January 2, 1827 – January 5, 1830; January 1, 1839 – March 2, 1846

Personal details
- Born: September 6, 1781 Lewes, Delaware
- Died: May 3, 1846 (aged 64) Lewes, Delaware
- Party: Federalist; Whig
- Spouse(s): Penelope Shields; Sarah Davis Watson
- Profession: Physician

Joseph Maull (September 6, 1781 – May 3, 1846) was an American medical doctor and politician from Lewes, in Sussex County, Delaware. He was a veteran of the War of 1812, and a member of the Federalist Party, then later the Whig Party, who served in the Delaware General Assembly and as Governor of Delaware.

== Early life and family ==
Maull was born at Pilottown, near Lewes, Delaware, son of John and Mary Marsh Maull. His father was a shipwright who ran arms from the West Indies during the American Revolution. He purportedly died when a ship's mast fell on him. During the American Revolution, Joseph Maull had an uncle, Nathaniel, who piloted ships for the American Committee of Safety, and another, James, who scouted the Delaware Bay for the British. Maull, himself, served in the 3rd Brigade of Delaware Militia, defending Lewes during the War of 1812.

Maull studied medicine under Dr. John Wolfe of Lewes and spent the rest of his life as a practicing physician from his home in Milton, Delaware. He married Penelope Shields in 1802 and they had two children, Susan and George. After her death, he married Sarah Davis Watson in 1820, and they had no children. They were members of St. Peter's Episcopal Church in Lewes.

== Political career ==
Maull served in the state senate for 21 years, from the 1816 session through the 1824 session, again from the 1827 session through the 1830 session and finally from the 1839–40 session through the 1845–46 session. As he was Speaker during the last session, he became Governor of Delaware upon the death of Governor Thomas Stockton on March 2, 1846, serving until his own death on May 3, 1846. He was the seventh Governor of Delaware to die in office. Maull began his career as a Federalist, and joined the Whig Party with the party realignment of the 1830s. When he was governor he was opposed to the foreign policy of U.S. President James K. Polk, including the annexation of Texas.

== Death and legacy ==
Maull died at Lewes and is buried there at the St. Peter's Episcopal Churchyard.

The Maull House was added to the National Register of Historic Places in 1970, with a boundary increase in 1978.

== Almanac ==
Elections were held the first Tuesday in October and members of the Delaware General Assembly took office on the first Tuesday of January. State senators had a three-year term. Since 1831, elections have been held on the first Tuesday after November 1 and state senators have had a four-year term. The governor takes office the third Tuesday in January, and has a four-year term.

Delaware General Assembly (sessions while Governor)
Year	Assembly	Senate majority	Speaker	House majority	Speaker
1845–1846	63rd	Whig	Joseph Maull	Whig	William Temple

Public offices
Office	Type	Location	Began office	Ended office	Notes
State Senator	Legislature	Dover	January 7, 1817	January 6, 1818	
State Senator	Legislature	Dover	January 6, 1818	January 2, 1821	
State Senator	Legislature	Dover	January 2, 1821	January 6, 1824	
State Senator	Legislature	Dover	January 2, 1827	January 5, 1830	
Delegate	Convention	Dover	November 1831	December 2, 1831	State Constitution
State Senator	Legislature	Dover	January 1, 1839	January 3, 1843	
State Senator	Legislature	Dover	January 3, 1843	March 2, 1846	
Governor	Executive	Dover	March 2, 1846	May 3, 1846	Acting

Delaware General Assembly service
Dates	Assembly	Chamber	Majority	Governor	Committees	District
1817	41st	State Senate	Federalist	John Clark		Sussex at-large
1818	42nd	State Senate	Federalist	John Clark		Sussex at-large
1819	43rd	State Senate	Federalist	John Clark		Sussex at-large
1820	44th	State Senate	Federalist	Jacob Stout		Sussex at-large
1821	45th	State Senate	Federalist	John Collins		Sussex at-large
1822	46th	State Senate	Federalist	John Collins		Sussex at-large
1823	47th	State Senate	Democratic-Republican	Joseph Haslet		Sussex at-large
1828	52nd	State Senate	Federalist	Charles Polk Jr.		Sussex at-large
1829	53rd	State Senate	National Republican	Charles Polk Jr.		Sussex at-large
1839–1840	60th	State Senate	Whig	Cornelius P. Comegys		Sussex at-large
1841–1842	61st	State Senate	Whig	William B. Cooper		Sussex at-large
1843–1844	62nd	State Senate	Whig	William B. Cooper		Sussex at-large
1845–1846	63rd	State Senate	Whig	Thomas Stockton	Speaker	Sussex at-large

== Images ==
- Hall of Governors Portrait Gallery. Portrait courtesy of Historical and Cultural Affairs, Dover

== Places with more information ==
- Delaware Historical Society; website; 505 North Market Street, Wilmington, Delaware 19801; (302) 655-7161.
- University of Delaware; Library website; 181 South College Avenue, Newark, Delaware 19717; (302) 831-2965.

Political offices
Preceded by Thomas Stockton	Governor of Delaware; 1846	Succeeded by William Temple
