= William Temple (politician) =

American politician

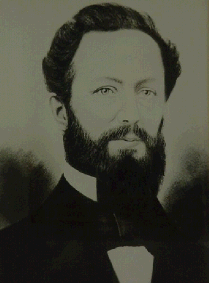

Member of the U.S. House of Representatives from Delaware's at-large district
- In office March 4, 1863 – May 28, 1863
- Preceded by: George P. Fisher
- Succeeded by: Nathaniel B. Smithers

35th Governor of Delaware
- In office May 6, 1846 – January 19, 1847
- Preceded by: Joseph Maull
- Succeeded by: William Tharp

Member of the Delaware Senate
- In office January 7, 1849 – January 2, 1855

Member of the Delaware House of Representatives
- In office January 7, 1845 – May 7, 1846

Personal details
- Born: February 28, 1814 Queen Anne's County, Maryland, U.S.
- Died: May 28, 1863 (aged 49) Smyrna, Delaware, U.S.
- Party: Whig; Democratic
- Spouse: Sarah Ann Ringgold
- Occupation: Merchant

William Temple (February 28, 1814 – May 28, 1863) was an American merchant and politician from Smyrna, in Kent County, Delaware. He was a member of the Whig Party, and later the Democratic Party, who served in the Delaware General Assembly, as Governor of Delaware, and as U.S. Representative from Delaware. He is the youngest governor to serve in Delaware in all of its history.

== Early life and family ==
Temple was born in Queen Anne's County, Maryland, the son of George Temple. The Temples had lived in the area since the mid-1700s. Templeville, on the borders of Queen Anne and Caroline counties and near the Maryland-Delaware line, is most likely named for the Temple family. William had five brothers and a sister. At the age of 18 he moved to Smyrna, Delaware and began his work as a merchant there. He married Sarah Ann Ringgold, daughter of William Ringgold of Kenton, in 1838 and they had three children, Sarah Louisa, Emma Frances, and William George. Both his daughters died as infants, and his wife, Sarah, died in 1851 at 33 years of age. It is believed they lived at the northeast corner of Main and Mt. Vernon Streets and were members of St. Peter's Episcopal Church in Smyrna.

== Delaware politics ==
Throughout the 19th century Delaware politics was characterized by a conservative downstate, agrarian and small business majority, in opposition to a Wilmington based industrialist minority. This majority was led into the Whig Party by John M. Clayton, but when that party broke up over the issue of slavery, generally moved over to a conservative Democratic Party. As the sectional issues intensified with the coming of the Civil War, this majority became impossibly conflicted between its certain loyalty to the Union and its equally certain view that decisions about property, including slaves, belonged with the states. The result was first an effort by many to find a non-existent middle ground, and then, with a much diminished majority, entry into constant and bitter conflict with the Republican minority centered in Wilmington and supported by the Federal government.

== Governor of Delaware ==
As a successful and popular conservative businessman, Temple reflected the majority views well. Temple was elected to the State House in the fall of 1844. He became Speaker in January 1846. After the successive deaths in office of the elected governor, Thomas Stockton, and his constitutional successor, the Speaker of the State Senate, Joseph Maull, Temple surprisingly became governor himself on May 6, 1846, the third governor in two years. At 32 years of age, he was the youngest Delaware governor ever and only served the remainder of the term, until January 19, 1847. No sooner had he inherited the job than he received a call from President James K. Polk to raise troops for the Mexican–American War. Much of his short tenure was spent on this task.

== Civil War ==
Following his time as governor, Temple was elected to the Delaware Senate and served in three sessions, from the 1849–1850 session through the 1853–1854 session. With the demise of the Whig Party, he was too conservative to support the agenda of Stephen A. Douglas, but too fearful of disunion to support the Republican Party or the eventual candidacy of John C. Breckinridge. In the election of 1860, Temple sought the elusive middle ground, and was one of the Delaware leaders of the short lived Constitutional Union Party. This party supported the right of each state to decide the slavery question, but argued that somehow that right could be preserved within the Union.

After the election of Abraham Lincoln and the secession of the Confederate states, Temple took a position opposing the enforced restoration of the Union, and joined the Democratic Party. After presiding over a futile "Peace Convention" in Dover in June 1861, he became the Democratic candidate for the U.S. House of Representatives in the hotly contested and controversial 1862 election. Temple's opponent was the incumbent Republican George P. Fisher, who had served as Secretary of State when Temple was governor. Now, Fisher was convinced that there were various schemes being planned to prevent a legitimate election. Accordingly, he requested that Abraham Lincoln leave the Delaware troops in the U.S. Army home until after the election, and that he send additional Federal troops to supervise the polls on election day. The Democrats were outraged and managed to narrowly elect Temple and a majority in the General Assembly, although losing the governorship. While officially a member of the U.S. House from March 4, 1863, Temple died before the December convening of the House, and consequently never actually served. He was forty-nine years old. In a subsequent special election, Republican Nathaniel B. Smithers won the seat due to a Democratic Party boycott of the election in protest of the continuing presence of Federal troops at the polling places.

== Death and legacy ==
Temple died at Smyrna. He is buried in the St. Peter's Episcopal Church Cemetery. The grave was unmarked until 1979 when a stone was placed where he is believed to have been buried. The plaque on the stone simply reads, "William Temple 1814–1863 Legislator Elected to Congress Governor of Delaware 1846–1847". His grandson, William G. Temple, was an ordained priest in the Roman Catholic Church and was the first priest at St. Elizabeth's Parish in Wilmington. An obituary reads:

He was emphatically a man of the world, possessing those rare qualities calculated to win every man and repel none. Frank, generous, familiar and courteous, he possessed the key to unlock the hearts of men and blend their interests with his in the prosecution of the public interest. Certainly he was a very pure minded, honorable man, a man of soul and feeling, a friend of all and a great help to many in times of need.

His house at Smyrna is a contributing property in the Smyrna Historic District.

== Almanac ==
Elections are held the first Tuesday after November 1. Members of the General Assembly take office the first Tuesday of January. State senators have a four-year term and state representatives have a two-year term. The governor takes office the third Tuesday of January and has a four-year term. U.S. Representatives take office March 4 and have a two-year term.

Delaware General Assembly (sessions while governor)
Year	Assembly	Senate Majority	Speaker	House Majority	Speaker
1845–1846	63rd	Whig	vacant	Whig	vacant

Public Offices
Office	Type	Location	Began office	Ended office	notes
State Representative	Legislature	Dover	January 7, 1845	May 6, 1846	
Governor	Executive	Dover	May 6, 1846	January 19, 1847	acting
State Senator	Legislature	Dover	January 2, 1849	January 4, 1853	
State Senator	Legislature	Dover	January 4, 1853	January 2, 1855	
U.S. Representative	Legislature	Washington	March 4, 1863	May 28, 1863	

Delaware General Assembly service
Dates	Assembly	Chamber	Majority	Governor	Committees	District
1845–1846	63rd	State House	Whig	Thomas Stockton	Speaker	Kent at-large
1849–1850	65th	State Senate	Whig	William Tharp		Kent at-large
1851–1852	66th	State Senate	Whig	William H. H. Ross		Kent at-large
1853–1854	67th	State Senate	Whig	William H. H. Ross		Kent at-large

United States Congressional service
Dates	Congress	Chamber	Majority	President	Committees	Class/District
1863–1864	38th	U.S. House	Republican	Abraham Lincoln		at-large

Election results
Year	Office	Subject	Party	Votes	%	Opponent	Party	Votes	%
1862	U.S. Representative	William Temple	Democratic	8,051	50%	George P. Fisher	Republican	8,014	50%

== See also ==
- List of members of the United States Congress who died in office (1790–1899)

== Images ==
- Hall of Governors Portrait Gallery; Portrait courtesy of Historical and Cultural Affairs, Dover.

U.S. House of Representatives
Preceded by George P. Fisher	Member of the U.S. House of Representatives from Delaware's at-large congressional district 1863	Succeeded by Nathaniel B. Smithers
Political offices
Preceded by Joseph Maull	Governor of Delaware; 1846–1847	Succeeded by William Tharp
