= William B. Cooper (Delaware politician) =

American politician (1771–1849)

32nd Governor of Delaware
- In office January 19, 1841 – January 21, 1845
- Preceded by: Cornelius P. Comegys
- Succeeded by: Thomas Stockton

Member of the Delaware House of Representatives
- In office January 2, 1816 – January 6, 1818; January 6, 1835 – January 3, 1837

Personal details
- Born: December 16, 1771 Laurel, Delaware, U.S.
- Died: April 27, 1849 (aged 77) Laurel, Delaware, U.S.
- Party: Federalist; Whig
- Spouse(s): Nancy Jones; Jane Townsend Palmer
- Occupation: Farmer

William Barkley Cooper (December 16, 1771 – April 27, 1849) was an American politician from Laurel, in Sussex County, Delaware. He was a member of the Federalist Party, then later the Whig Party, who served in the Delaware General Assembly and as Governor of Delaware.

== Early life and family ==
Cooper was born in Laurel, Delaware, son of Isaac and Comfort Townsend Barkley Cooper. His grandfather, Barkley Townsend, came to Laurel in 1768 from Dorchester County, Maryland and at one time owned nearly the whole area. His father served in the Delaware General Assembly, was a member of the Delaware convention that ratified the U.S. Constitution in 1787, and was a member of the 1792 Delaware Constitutional Convention. His brother, Thomas Cooper, also served in the Delaware General Assembly and was one of the U.S. Representatives from Delaware from 1813 until 1817.

William Cooper married Nancy Jones in 1795, and had one child, William T. After her death, he married Nelly Warren in 1816, and after her death, he married for the third time, Jane Townsend Palmer in 1828. There were no children by either of the later marriages. They lived at the southeast corner of 4th and King Street in Laurel and were members of the Methodist Church. He served as an ensign in the Delaware militia, 5th Company, 9th Regiment, and later was commissioned captain of the 3rd Brigade of the Troop of Horse.

== Professional and political career ==
Cooper was appointed a Justice of the Peace from 1797 until 1805 and was also Sheriff of Sussex County from 1800 until 1812. He served in the state house in the 1816 and 1817 sessions and then again in the 1835/36 session. In 1817 he was appointed as an associate justice of the Court of Common Pleas for Sussex County. He was elected Governor of Delaware in 1840 by defeating Warren Jefferson of Seaford, the Democratic candidate, and served as governor from January 19, 1841, until January 21, 1845. Cooper is noted for complaining to the General Assembly that penal code was antiquated, requiring the governor to issue an excessive number of pardons to properly administer justice according to the standards of the day.

Upon leaving office in 1841, Cooper, in his message,

congratulates the State that her finances are free from embarrassment, and the surplus remained undiminished, while every demand which had been made on the Treasury had been promptly discharged. The currency, though reduced, was perfectly sound; the credit remained unimpaired, and no imputation or suspicion of fraud or public dishonor rested on the fair fame of the Commonwealth; while every consideration conspired to prove that the people of the State, as far as their condition was affected by the action of the State Government, were still preeminently prosperous and happy.

Delaware General Assembly (sessions while Governor)
Year	Assembly	Senate Majority	Speaker	House Majority	Speaker
1841–1842	61st	Whig	Charles Polk, Jr.	Whig	Robert Houston
1843–1844	62nd	Whig	Presley Spruance	Whig	William O. Redden

== Death and legacy ==
Cooper died at his home and is buried in the Old Methodist Cemetery at Laurel on April 27, 1849. His only son, William, went South during the Civil War and, according to some, served in the Confederate Army, was held captive for a time at Fort Delaware, and escaped in 1862. Governor Cooper is remembered "as a man of great force of character; an educated man, being polished in manners with intellectual gifts of a high order and a fascinating conversationalist." Another recalls that,"he was a high tempered man ... and was in the habit of swearing very hard in his angry moments. When reproved, he said he couldn't help it."

== Almanac ==
Until 1831, elections were held the first Tuesday of October. Members of the Delaware General Assembly took office the first Tuesday of January. State representatives had a one-year term. After 1831, elections were held the first Tuesday after November 1 and the terms of state representatives were increased to two years. The governor takes office the third Tuesday of January and has a four-year term.

Public Offices
Office	Type	Location	Began office	Ended office	notes
Sheriff	Judiciary	Georgetown	1800	1812	Sussex County
State Representative	Legislature	Dover	January 2, 1816	January 7, 1817	
State Representative	Legislature	Dover	January 7, 1817	January 6, 1818	
State Representative	Legislature	Dover	January 6, 1835	January 3, 1837	
Governor	Executive	Dover	January 19, 1841	January 21, 1845	

Delaware General Assembly service
Dates	Assembly	Chamber	Majority	Governor	Committees	District
1816	40th	State House	Federalist	Daniel Rodney		Sussex at-large
1817	41st	State House	Federalist	John Clark		Sussex at-large
1835–1836	58th	State House	Whig	Caleb Bennett		Sussex at-large

Election results
Year	Office	Subject	Party	Votes	%	Opponent	Party	Votes	%
1840	Governor	William B. Cooper	Whig	5,850	54%	Warren Jefferson	Democratic	5,024	46%

== Notes ==
Party political offices
Preceded by Cornelius P. Comegys	Whig nominee for Governor of Delaware; 1840	Succeeded by Thomas Stockton
Political offices
Preceded by Cornelius P. Comegys	Governor of Delaware; 1841–1845	Succeeded by Thomas Stockton
