= Delaware Historical Society =

State historical society of the United States

- Logo of the Delaware Historical Society

- Location in Delaware
- Established: 1864
- Location: 504 N. Market Street, Wilmington, Delaware
- Coordinates: 39.742785°N 75.550382°W
- Type: History
- Directors: David Young, Ph.D.
- Presidents: Margaret Laird, Ph.D.
- Public transit access: DART First State bus: 2, 4, 5, 6, 9, 10, 11, 12, 13, 14, 15, 25, 35, 52
- Website: dehistory.org

The Delaware Historical Society began in 1864 as an effort to preserve documents from the Civil War. Since then, it has expanded into a statewide historical institution with several buildings, including Old Town Hall and the Delaware History Museum, in Wilmington and the historic Read House & Gardens in New Castle.

The society participates in joint marketing with the Delaware Tourism Office, the Greater Wilmington Convention & Visitors Bureau, and the Brandywine Museums & Gardens Alliance.

== Delaware History Center ==
The society's Wilmington Campus is located between 5th and 6th Streets on Lower Market Street in Wilmington. This row is the historic shopping district and currently markets itself as the LoMa Design District to promote urban redevelopment. The complex includes an arch over the street.

=== Delaware History Museum ===
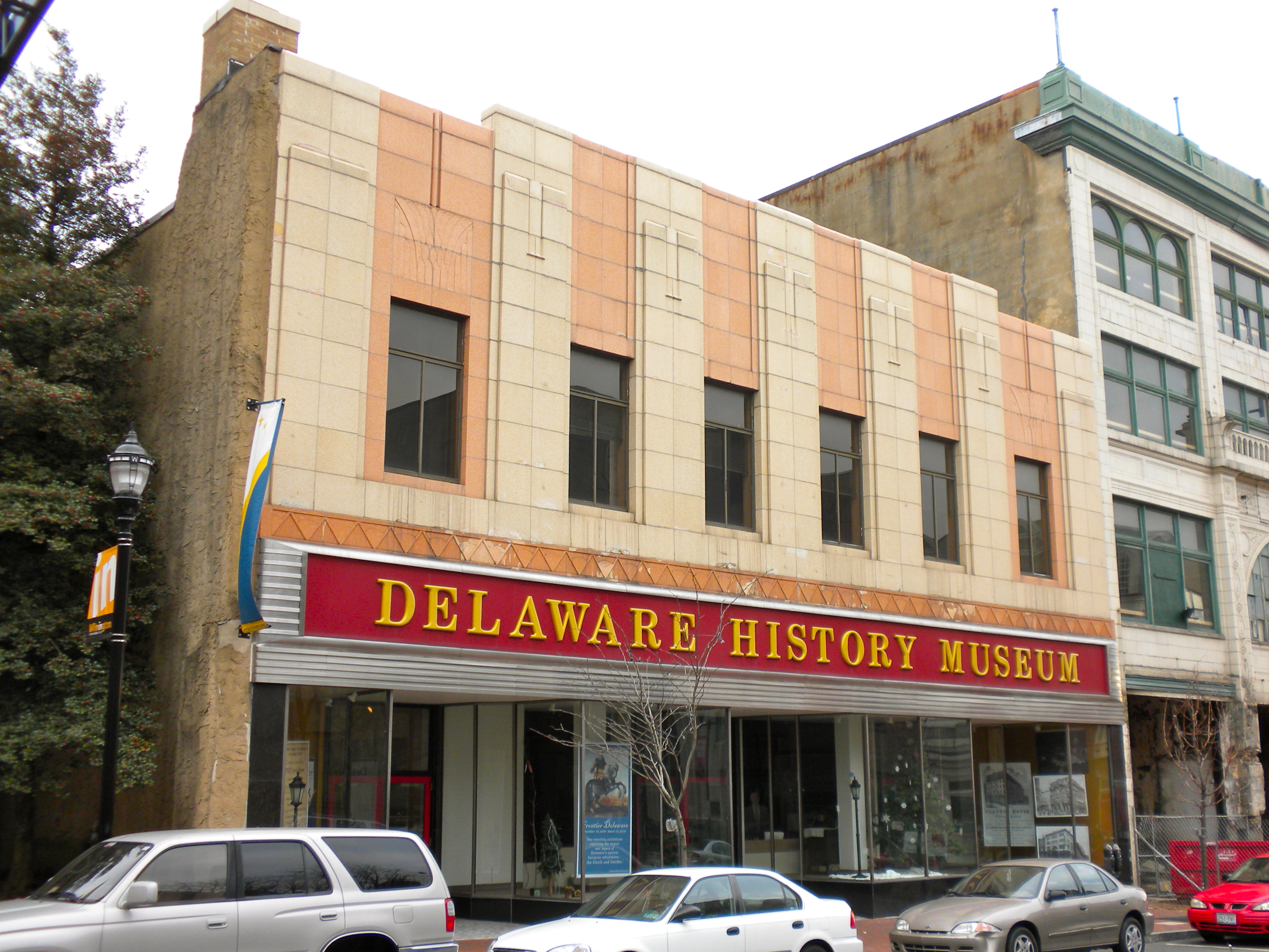
Delaware History Museum

The main museum consists of two permanent exhibit halls in a converted 1941 art deco Woolworth's store, one of two that used to operate on Market Street. Exhibits include “Delaware: One State, Many Stories,” and Discover Delaware. The Jane and Littleton Mitchell Center for African American Heritage is also within the building.

=== Old Town Hall ===
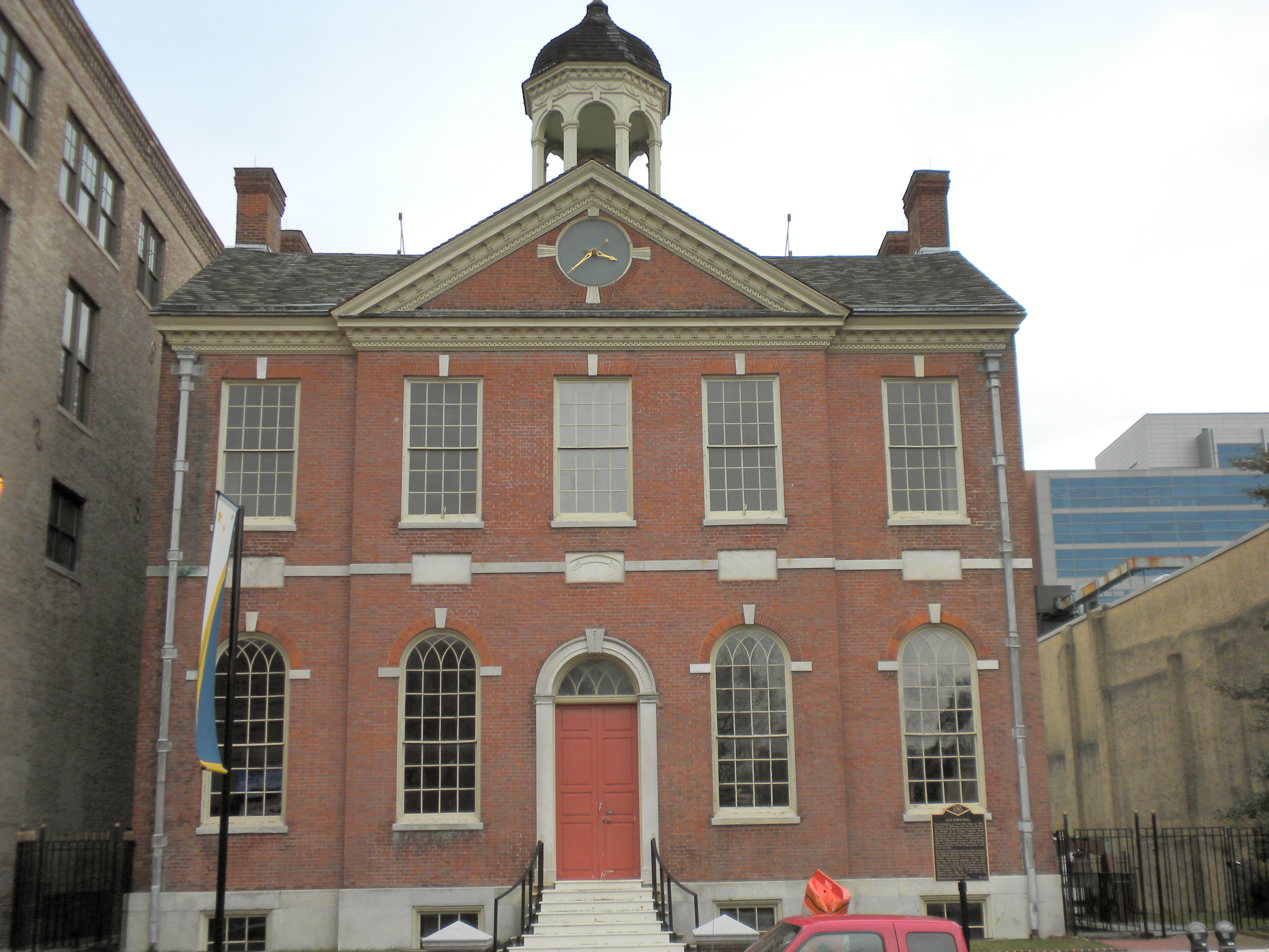
Old Town Hall

The Old Town Hall served as the city hall for the Burough and later City of Wilmington. Constructed in 1798 in the federal style, the building also included the jail and library. The Marquis de Lafayette received a reception there and President Andrew Jackson was the guest of honor at a dinner. In 1851, the body of Senator Henry Clay officially lay in state.

=== Willingtown Square ===
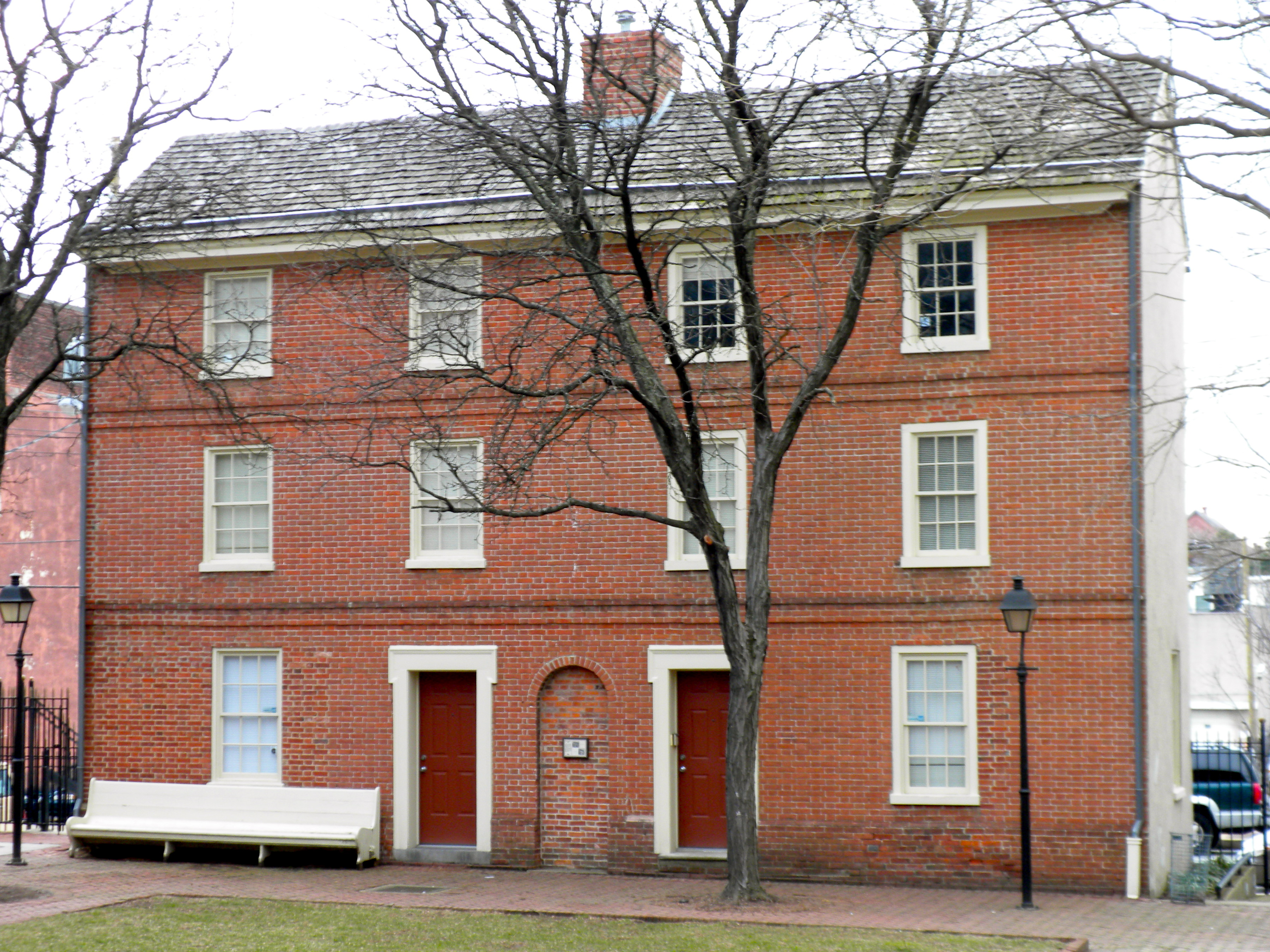
Coxe House(s) in Willingtown Square

Willingtown Square is a collection of buildings relocated from other sections of downtown to make way for high rise construction. Started as part of the bicentennial celebration in 1976, the square is named after Thomas Willing, the founder of Wilmington.

The buildings' interiors serve as office and meeting space for the society but patrons can access the courtyard and grounds.

Flemish bond brick pattern

Building Name	Built	Construction	Original Use	Relocated
Cook-Simms House	1778	Flemish bond	Herbal medicine shop, Residence	1976
Catherine Coxe House	1801	Band Box	Residence	1976
Margaret Coxe House	1801	Band Box	Residence	1976
Jacobs House (aka Zachariah Ferris House)	1748	Flemish bond	Residence	1976
Jacob Dingee House	1771	Flemish bond	Cabinet workshop, Residence	1976
Obidiah Dingee House	1773	Flemish bond	Cabinet workshop, Residence	1976

== Library and research center ==
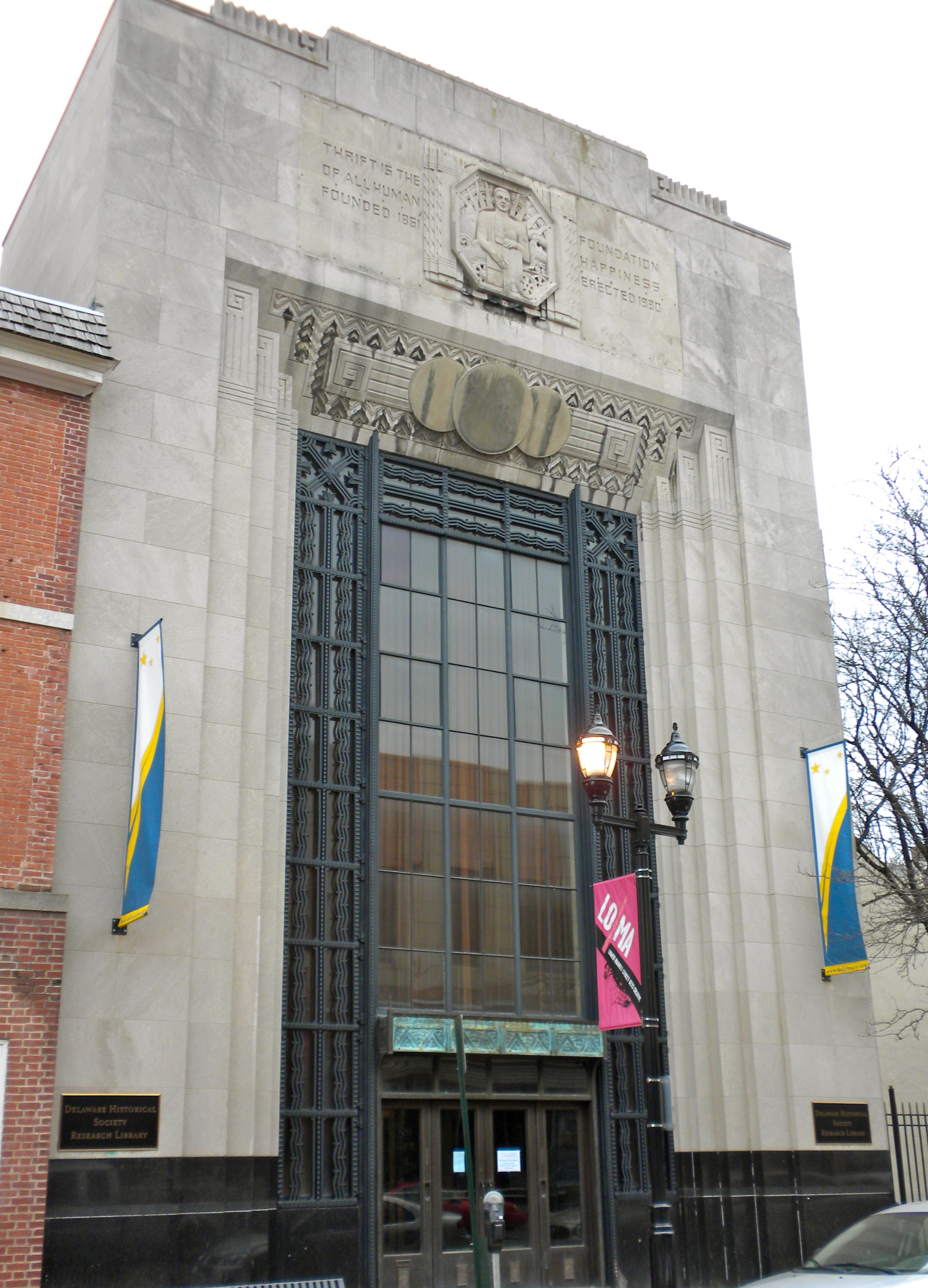
Library and research center

The society provides free access to a research library with unique special collections. The collection includes work on Delaware genealogy, maps, and Underground Railroad as well as a letter from George Washington to Caesar Rodney. Senator William V. Roth's widow donated all of his papers to the library. The library is open Mondays from 1 pm to 9 pm, Tuesdays and Thursdays from 9 am to 1 pm, Fridays from 9 am to 5 pm, and the third Saturday of every month from 10 am to 4 pm.

Located at 505 North Market Street, a former Artisans Savings Bank branch location houses the library. Tilghman Ware Company built the art deco structure in 1930–31.

== Read House and gardens ==
Located in New Castle on the Strand, the George Read II House was built in 1801 by George Read, Jr., the son of George Read, a signer of the Declaration of Independence. The house was the largest in the state at the time it was built with 22 rooms covering 14,000 square feet (1,300 m^{2}). The house also includes a rathskeller in the basement that served as a speakeasy. This dates from the 1920s when the Laird family owned the house and were bootleggers. The house was restored in 1986.

== See also ==
- History of Delaware
- List of Woolworth buildings
- List of museums in Delaware
- National Register of Historic Places listings in Wilmington, Delaware
