= 1804 United States gubernatorial elections =

- March 13, 1804 – December 7, 1804

13 state governorships
	Majority party	Minority party
Party	Democratic-Republican	Federalist
Last election	13 governorships	4 governorships
Seats before	13	4
Seats won	8	5
Seats after	12	5
Seat change	▼1	▲1
Seats up	9	4
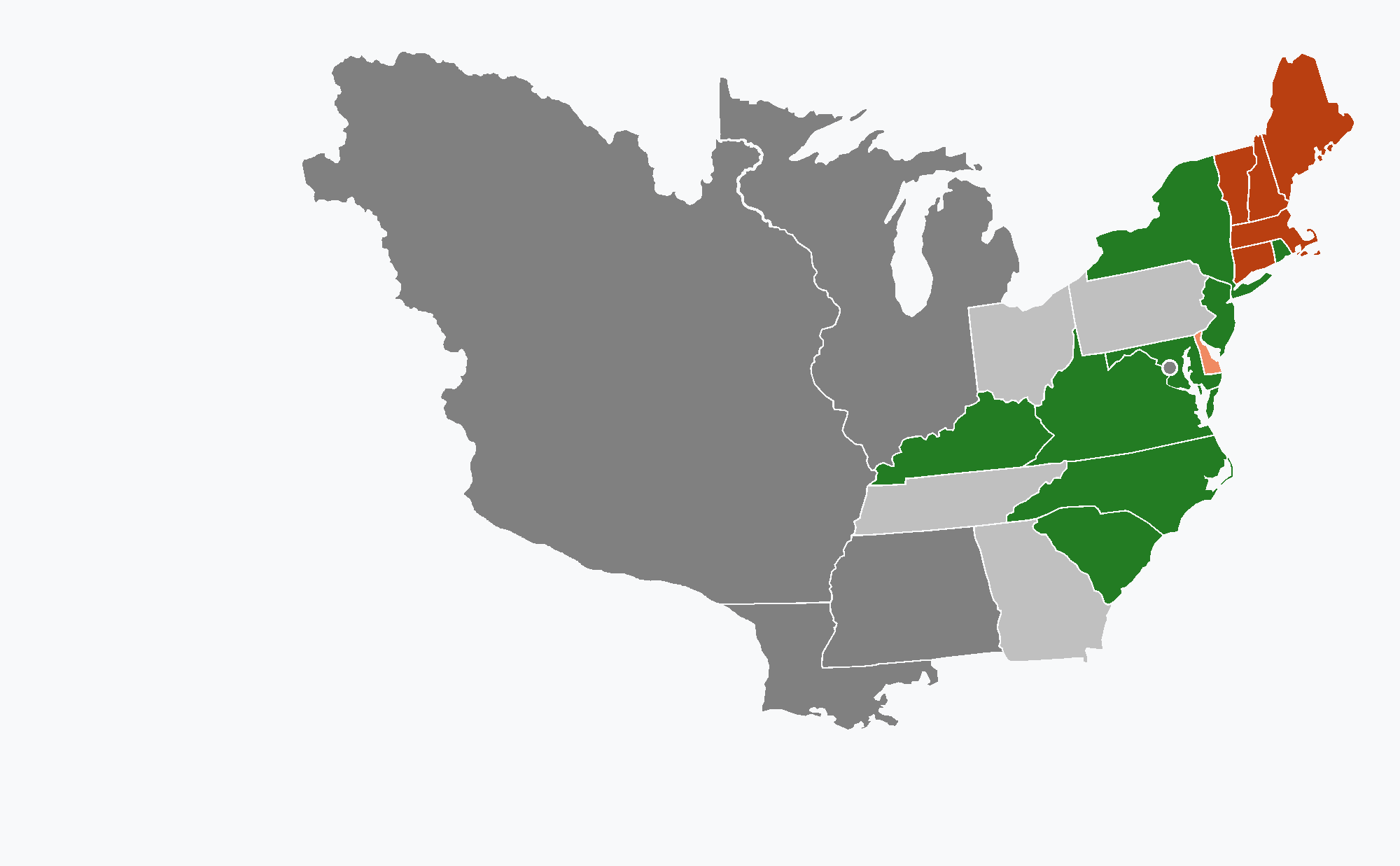
- Democratic-Republican gain Democratic-Republican hold Federalist gain Federalist hold

United States gubernatorial elections were held in 1804, in 13 states, concurrent with the House, Senate elections and presidential election.

Eight governors were elected by popular vote and five were elected by state legislatures.

== Results ==
State	Election date	Incumbent	Party	Status	Opposing candidates
Connecticut	April 12, 1804 (Note: Glashan records this election as taking place on April 9.)	Jonathan Trumbull Jr.	Federalist	Re-elected, 11,108 (61.23%) (Note: Some sources record the result as Trumbull 11,963, Hart 7,376; this includes 855 votes for Trumbull and 505 for Hart rejected by the General Assembly.)	William Hart (Democratic-Republican), 6,871 (37.88%); Scattering 162 (0.89%)
Delaware	October 2, 1804	David Hall	Democratic-Republican	Term-limited, Federalist victory	Nathaniel Mitchell (Federalist), 4,391 (52.02%); Joseph Haslet (Democratic-Republican), 4,050 (47.98%)
Kentucky	August 6–8, 1804	James Garrard	Democratic-Republican	Term-limited, Democratic-Republican victory	Christopher Greenup (Democratic-Republican), 25,917 (100.00%)
Maryland (election by legislature)	November 20, 1804	Robert Bowie	Democratic-Republican	Re-elected, "by a majority"	
Massachusetts	April 2, 1804	Caleb Strong	Federalist	Re-elected, 30,011 (55.07%) (Note: Some sources record the result as Strong 30,041, Sullivan 24,368, Scattering 195; this includes the votes of Monmouth which were rejected by the General Assembly, in addition to a number of votes given for Strong and Sullivan under incorrect names which are correctly recorded as scattering.)	James Sullivan (Democratic-Republican), 23,996 (44.03%); Scattering 492 (0.90%)
New Hampshire	March 13, 1804	John Taylor Gilman	Federalist	Re-elected, 12,216 (50.31%) (Note: Most 20th-century sources give the result as Gilman 12,246, Langdon 12,009. The result given here is that given in the New Hampshire Senate Journal.)	John Langdon (Democratic-Republican), 12,039 (49.58%); Scattering 27 (0.11%)
New Jersey (election by legislature)	October 25, 1804	Joseph Bloomfield	Democratic-Republican	Re-elected, 37 votes	Richard Stockton (Federalist), 16 votes
New York	April 24–26, 1804 (Note: Glashan records this election as taking place on April 23–25.)	George Clinton	Democratic-Republican	Retired, Democratic-Republican victory	Morgan Lewis (Democratic-Republican/Clintonian) (Note: Congressional Quarterly, Kallenbach and Kallenbach, and OurCampaigns describe Lewis as a Federalist.), 30,829 (58.16%); Aaron Burr (Democratic-Republican/Tammany Hall) (Note: Dubin and A New Nation Votes describe Burr as a Federalist. He appears to have had the support of the Federalist Party.), 22,139 (41.77%); Scattering 36 (0.06%)
North Carolina (election by legislature)	November 24, 1804	James Turner	Democratic-Republican	Re-elected, unknown number of votes	Scattering, 1 vote
Rhode Island	April 18, 1804	Arthur Fenner	Democratic-Republican/Country	Re-elected. Returns lost.	
South Carolina (election by legislature)	December 7, 1804	James Burchill Richardson	Democratic-Republican	Term-limited, Democratic-Republican victory	Paul Hamilton (Democratic-Republican), unknown number of votes
Vermont	September 4, 1804	Isaac Tichenor	Federalist	Re-elected, 8,075 (55.72%) (Note: Some sources record the result as Tichenor 8,796, Robinson 6,665; this includes 721 votes for Tichenor and 481 for Robinson from 31 towns rejected by the General Assembly.)	Jonathan Robinson (Democratic-Republican), 6,184 (42.67%); Scattering 232 (1.60%)
Virginia (election by legislature)	December 7, 1804	John Page	Democratic-Republican	Re-elected, "by a majority"	

== See also ==
- 1804 United States elections
  - 1804 United States presidential election
  - 1804–05 United States Senate elections
  - 1804–05 United States House of Representatives elections

== Bibliography ==
- Glashan, Roy R. (1979). American Governors and Gubernatorial Elections, 1775-1978. Westport, CT: Meckler Books. ISBN 0-930466-17-9.
- Gubernatorial Elections, 1787-1997. Washington, D.C.: Congressional Quarterly Inc. 1998. ISBN 1-56802-396-0.
- Dubin, Michael J. (2003). United States Gubernatorial Elections, 1776-1860: The Official Results by State and County. Jefferson, North Carolina: McFarland. ISBN 978-0-7864-1439-0.
- Kallenbach, Joseph E.; Kallenbach, Jessamine S., eds. (1977). American State Governors, 1776-1976. Vol. I. Dobbs Ferry, N.Y.: Oceana Publications, Inc. ISBN 0-379-00665-0.
