= List of elections in 1804 =

The following elections were held in the year 1804.

== North America ==
- 1804 United States elections

=== United States ===
- 1804 United States presidential election

==== United States lieutenant gubernatorial ====
- 1804 Connecticut lieutenant gubernatorial election

==== United States gubernatorial ====
- 1804 Connecticut gubernatorial election
- 1804 Delaware gubernatorial election
- 1804 Kentucky gubernatorial election
- 1804 Maryland gubernatorial election
- 1804 Massachusetts gubernatorial election
- 1804 New Hampshire gubernatorial election
- 1804 New Jersey gubernatorial election
- 1804 New York gubernatorial election
- 1804 North Carolina gubernatorial election
- 1804 Rhode Island gubernatorial election
- 1804 South Carolina gubernatorial election
- 1804 United States gubernatorial elections
- 1804 Vermont gubernatorial election
- 1804 Virginia gubernatorial election

==== United States Senate ====
- 1804 and 1805 United States Senate elections
- United States Senate special election in New York, November 1804
- United States Senate special elections in New York, February 1804

==== United States House of Representatives ====
- 1804–05 United States House of Representatives elections
- 1804 United States House of Representatives election in Delaware
- 1804 United States House of Representatives election in Georgia
- 1804 United States House of Representatives elections in Maryland
- 1804 Maryland's 5th congressional district special election
- 1804 United States House of Representatives elections in Massachusetts
- 1804 Massachusetts's 12th congressional district special election
- 1804 United States House of Representatives election in New Hampshire
- 1804 United States House of Representatives election in New Jersey
- 1804 United States House of Representatives elections in New York
- 1804 New York's 1st congressional district special election
- 1804 New York's 2nd and 3rd congressional district special elections
- 1804 United States House of Representatives elections in Ohio
- 1804 United States House of Representatives elections in Pennsylvania
- 1804 Pennsylvania's 2nd congressional district special election
- 1804 Pennsylvania's 10th congressional district special election
- 1804 United States House of Representatives elections in South Carolina
- 1804 United States House of Representatives election in Vermont

== See also ==
- Category:1804 elections
