= 1800 Kentucky gubernatorial election =

- May 6, 1800
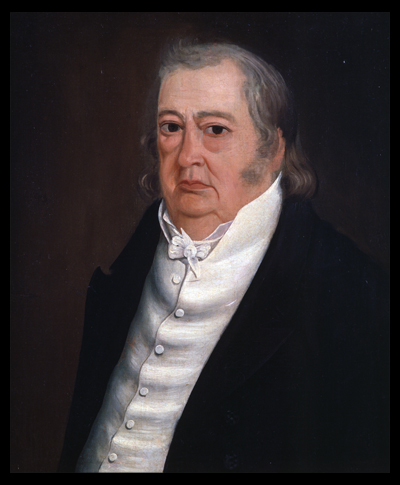

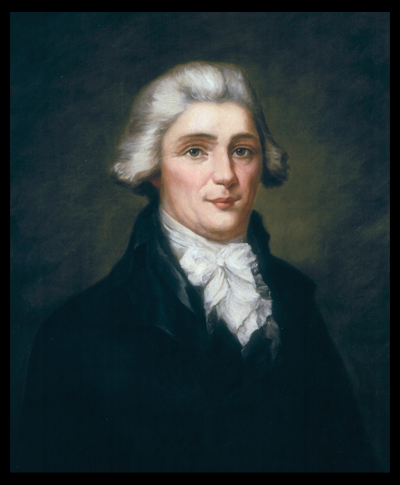

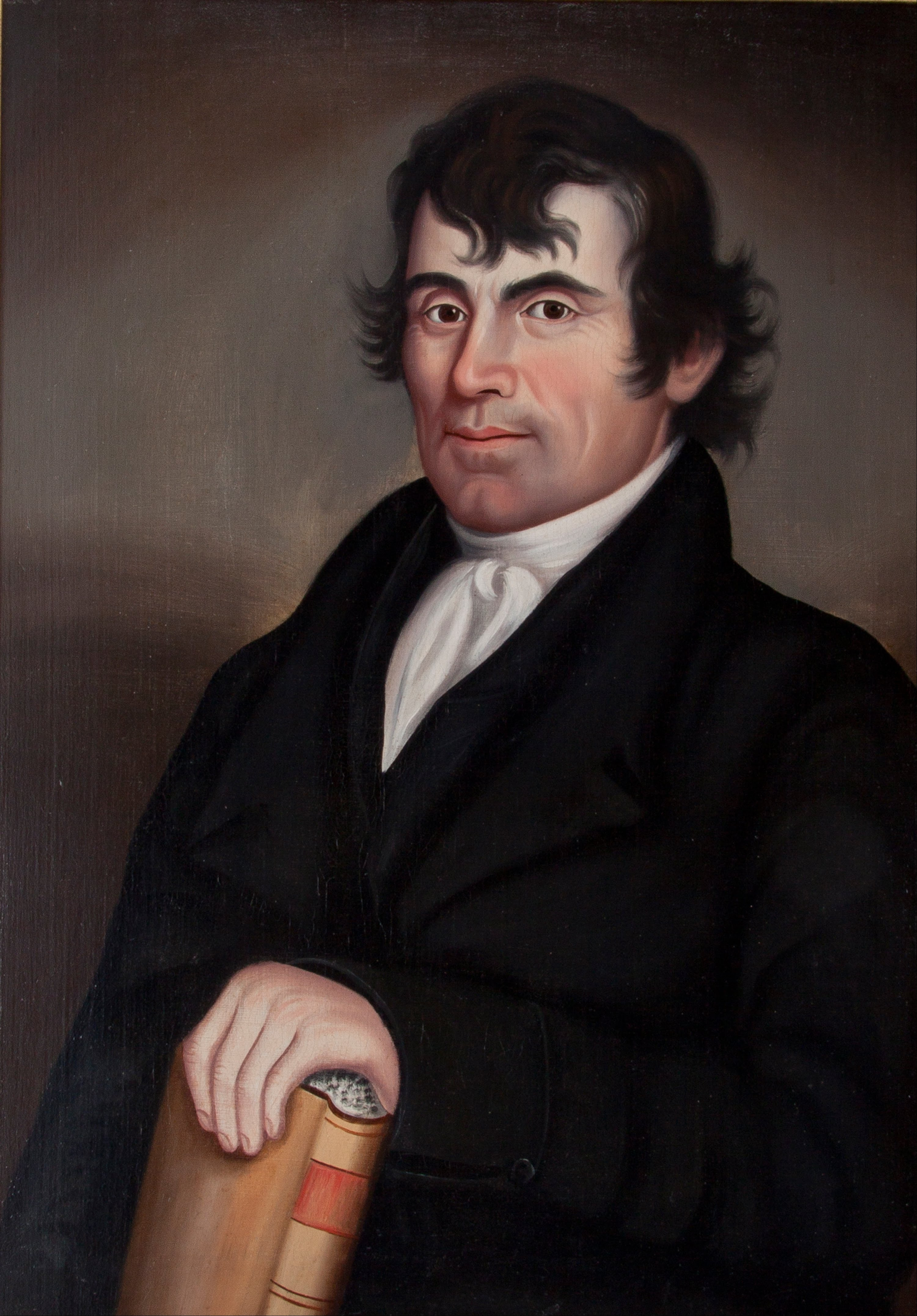

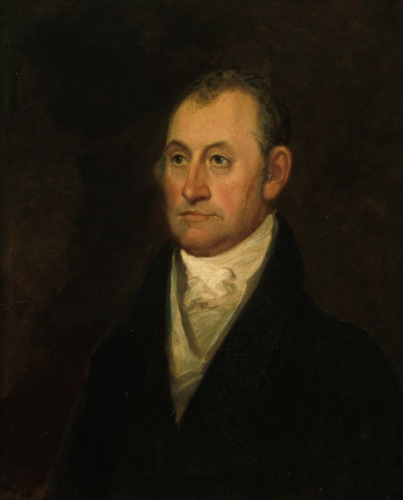
Nominee	James Garrard	Christopher Greenup
Party	Democratic-Republican	Democratic-Republican
Popular vote	8,390	6,745
Percentage	39.40%	31.67%
Nominee	Benjamin Logan	Thomas Todd
Party	Democratic-Republican	Democratic-Republican
Popular vote	3,995	2,166
Percentage	18.76%	10.17%
- Garrard: 30–40% 40–50% 50–60% 60–70% 70–80% Greenup: 30–40% 40–50% 50–60% 60–70% 70–80% Logan: 40–50% 50–60% 60–70% 80–90% No Data/Vote
Governor before election
James Garrard
Democratic-Republican
Elected Governor
James Garrard
Democratic-Republican

The 1800 Kentucky gubernatorial election was held on May 6, 1800, in order to elect the governor of Kentucky. Incumbent Democratic-Republican governor James Garrard won re-election against fellow Democratic-Republican candidates Benjamin Logan, Thomas Todd and Christopher Greenup in the first election decided by popular vote.

== General election ==
On election day, May 6, 1800, incumbent Democratic-Republican governor James Garrard won re-election by a margin of 1,645 votes against his foremost opponent and fellow Democratic-Republican candidate Christopher Greenup, thereby retaining Democratic-Republican control over the office of governor. Garrard was sworn in for his second term on June 1, 1800.

=== Results ===
Kentucky gubernatorial election, 1800
Party	Candidate	Votes	%
Democratic-Republican	James Garrard (incumbent)	8,390	39.40
Democratic-Republican	Christopher Greenup	6,745	31.67
Democratic-Republican	Benjamin Logan	3,995	18.76
Democratic-Republican	Thomas Todd	2,166	10.17
Total votes		21,296	100.00
Democratic-Republican hold			
