= George Latimer (Pennsylvania politician) =

American politician (1750–1825)

1st Speaker of the Pennsylvania House of Representatives
- In office 1794–1825
- Preceded by: Gerardus Wynkoop
- Succeeded by: Cadwalader Evans

Personal details
- Born: July 8, 1750 Newport, Delaware
- Died: June 12, 1825 (aged 74)
- Party: Federalist
- Profession: Merchant

George Latimer (July 8, 1750 – June 12, 1825) was a Philadelphia merchant and member of the Pennsylvania House of Representatives. He served as speaker of the Pennsylvania House 1794–1798.

== Early life ==
Latimer was born in Newport, Delaware.

== Personal life ==
Latimer married Margaret Cathcart on February 20, 1771. They had two daughters and one son.

He was severely injured after being thrown from his horse. He could not walk a great distance and had to be driven to his place of business.

By 1892, he had no living direct descendants.

== Military service ==
Latimer was a lieutenant-colonel in the Revolutionary Army.

== Political activities ==
In 1779, Latimer was elected as an assemblyman from New Castle County, Delaware.

He served in the Pennsylvania House of Representatives from 1792 to 1799. He ran for a House seat in 1789.

In 1791, Latimer (along with Henry Drinker, Robert Hare, Joseph Heister, George Fry, William Montgomery, and Samuel Miles) was named in a bill as a commissioner of a company to open a canal and lock navigation system between the Schuylkill and Susquehanna Rivers, the Schuylkill and Susquehanna Navigation Company. The bill passed the House and was scheduled to be read for a third time in the state Senate.

He was named as a presidential elector for the Election of 1792.

Latimer served as Speaker of the Pennsylvania House of Representatives from 1794 to 1798. Election dates:

- 1794: December 3, 1793
- 1795: December 4, 1794
- 1796: December 2, 1795 (34 votes....William Maclay had 13 votes)
- 1797: December 7, 1796
- 1798: unknown

Latimer was chairman of a meeting in Philadelphia for the support of State Senate candidate Benjamin R. Morgan.

He was a collector of customs at Philadelphia, 1798 – May 11, 1802 (replaced by General Peter Muhlenberg). The Poulson's American Daily Advertiser claimed that he was forced to resign and hoped the details would be made public. They also suggested that General Muhlenberg was put in this position so as to prevent a future gubernatorial candidacy.

In 1802, Latimer was nominated for a seat in the United States House of Representatives by the Federalist Party. He came in fourth out of six candidates, receiving 1,599 votes.

He served as a Federalist presidential elector in the Election of 1804.

== Business Activities ==
Latimer was elected as a director of the Bank of the United States in October, 1791.

Latimer served as president of the Union Fire Insurance Company. His merchant businesses were located at 71 South Wharves and 1 Pine Street.

== Other activities ==
Latimer became a member of the Hibernian Society in 1790.

== Sources ==
- "Latimer, George, 1750-1825". Tufts University.
