= 1797 United States Senate election in Delaware =

- January 6, 1797
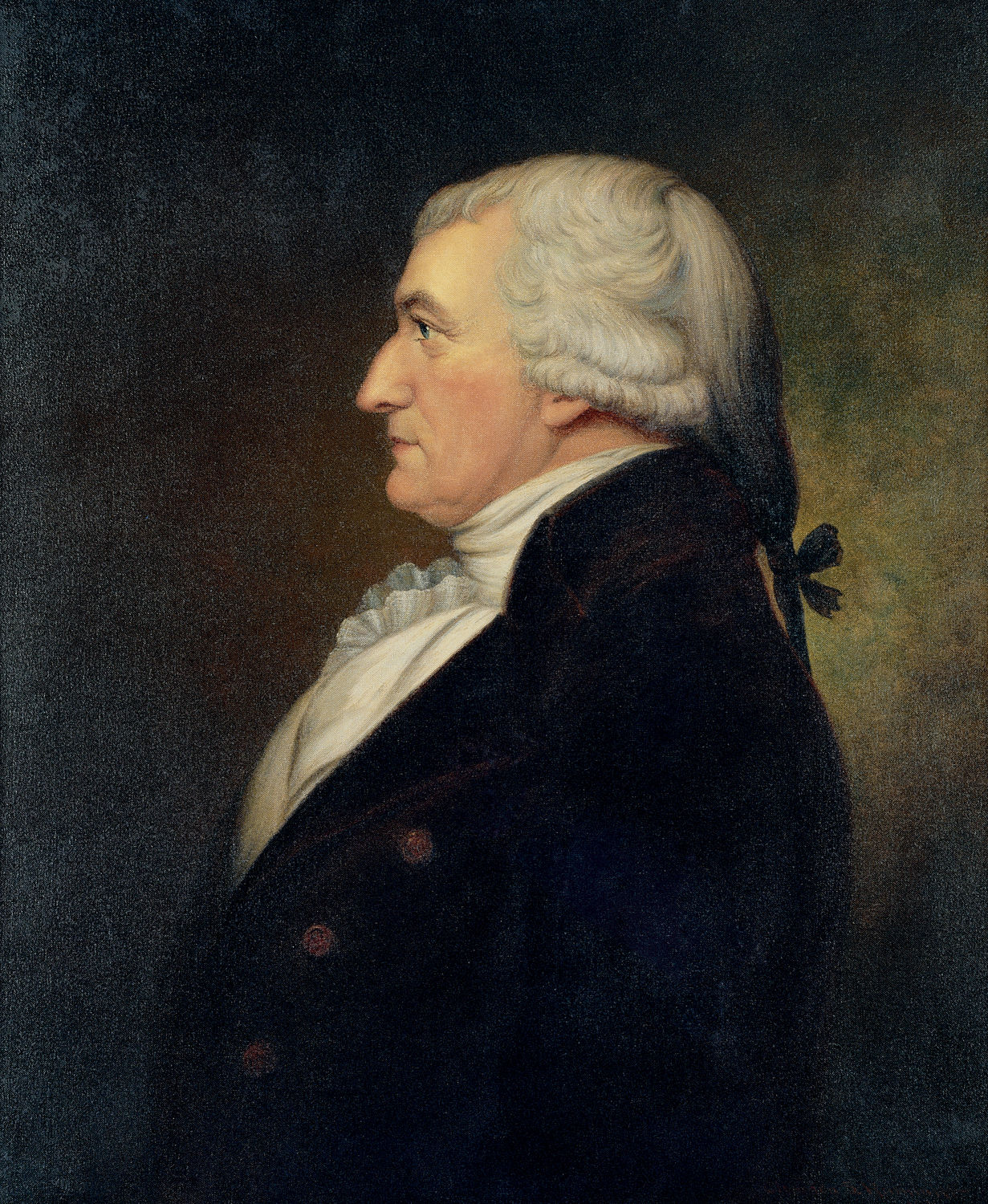

Nominee	Henry Latimer	David Hall
Party	Federalist	Democratic-Republican
Popular vote	16	6
Percentage	72.73%	27.27%
U.S. senator before election
Henry Latimer
Federalist
Elected U.S. Senator
Henry Latimer
Federalist

The 1797 United States Senate election in Delaware was held on January 6, 1797. Henry Latimer defeated the future governor of Delaware David Hall by 10 votes.

== Results ==
1797 United States Senate election in Delaware
Party	Candidate	Votes	%
Federalist	Henry Latimer (incumbent)	16	72.73%
Democratic-Republican	David Hall	6	27.27%
Total votes		22	100%
