= Col. David Hall House =

Historic house in Delaware, United States

- U.S. National Register of Historic Places
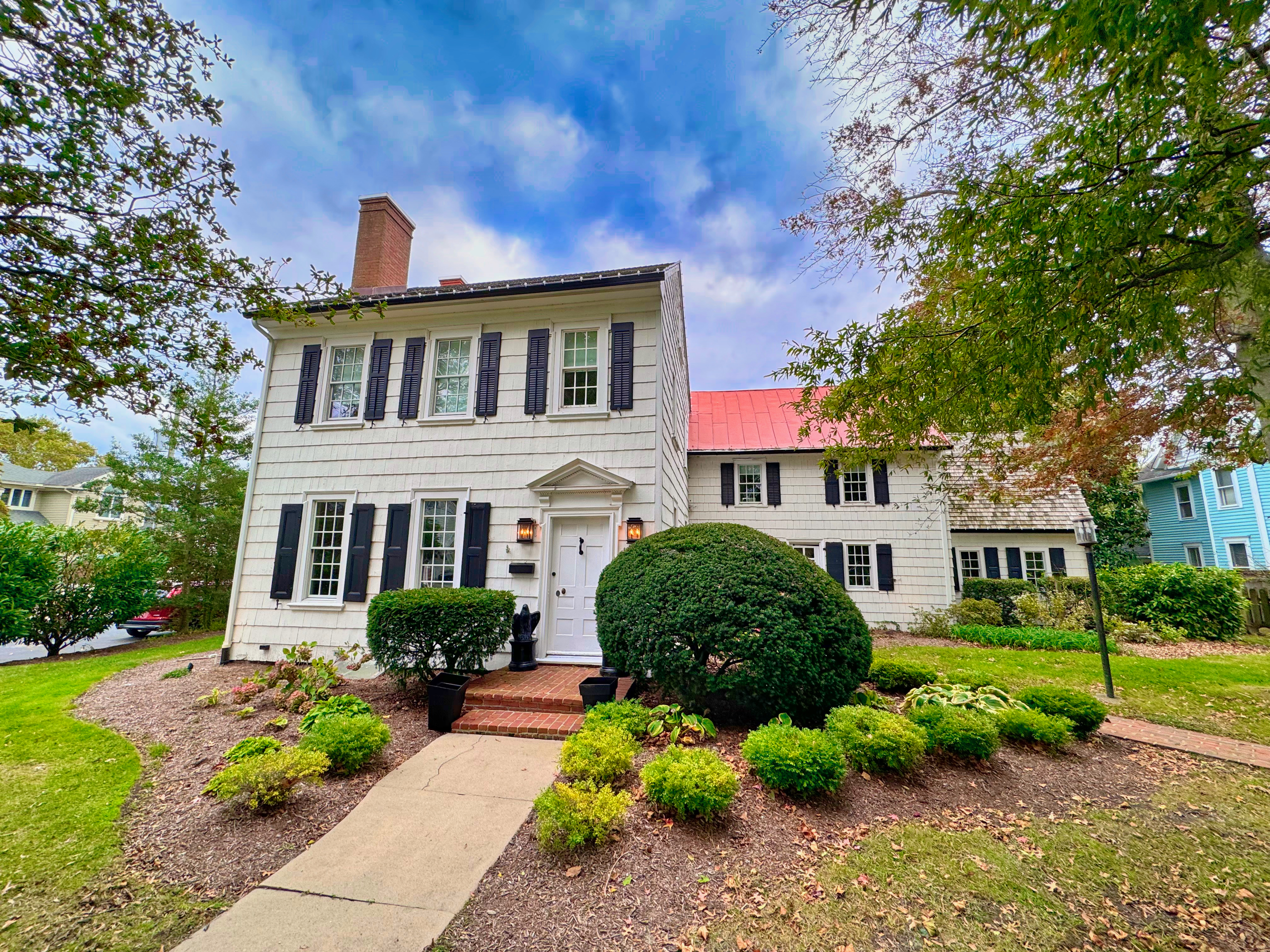
- Colonel David Hall House

- Location within Delaware Location within the United States
- Location: 107 King's Hwy., Lewes, Delaware
- Coordinates: 38°46′26″N 75°08′19″W
- Area: less than one acre
- Built: c. 1780, c. 1805
- NRHP reference No.: 76000585
- Added to NRHP: April 26, 1976

Col. David Hall House is a historic home located at Lewes, Sussex County, Delaware. The main house dates to about 1780, and is a 2 1/2-story, three-bay, frame structure. A lower 2 1/2-story wing was added about 1805. The main house is sheathed in its original cypress shingles and the wing in cedar shakes. It was the home of Colonel David Hall (1752–1817), who served as Governor of Delaware.

It was added to the National Register of Historic Places in 1976.
