= 1801 Delaware gubernatorial election =

- October 6, 1801
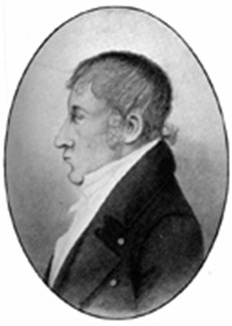

Nominee	David Hall	Nathaniel Mitchell
Party	Democratic-Republican	Federalist
Popular vote	3,475	3,457
Percentage	50.13%	49.87%
- Hall: 60–70% Mitchell: 50–60% 60–70%
Governor before election
James Sykes (acting)
Federalist
Elected Governor
David Hall
Democratic-Republican

The 1801 Delaware gubernatorial election was held on October 6, 1801. The Democratic-Republican candidate David Hall defeated the Federalist prothonotary for Sussex County, Delaware, Nathaniel Mitchell.

== General election ==
=== Results ===
1801 Delaware gubernatorial election
Party	Candidate	Votes	%	±%
Democratic-Republican	David Hall	3,475	50.13	▲6.53
Federalist	Nathaniel Mitchell	3,457	49.87	▼2.63
Total votes		6,932	100.00	
Democratic-Republican gain from Federalist				

=== Results by county ===
1801 Delaware gubernatorial election by county
County	David Hall Democratic-Republican		Nathaniel Mitchell Federalist		Margin		Total
County	#	%	#	%	#	%	Total
Kent	1,020	48.6	1,080	51.4	-60	-2.8	2,100
New Castle	1,465	68.2	682	31.8	783	36.4	2,147
Sussex	990	36.9	1,695	63.1	-705	-26.2	2,685
TOTAL	3,475	50.1	3,457	49.9	18	0.2	6,932

Counties that flipped from Federalist to Democratic-Republican

- New Castle

== Bibliography ==
- Dubin, Michael J. (2003). United States Gubernatorial Elections, 1776-1860: The Official Results by State and County. Jefferson, NC: McFarland and Company. ISBN 978-0-7864-1439-0.
- Lampi, Philip J. (2012). "Delaware 1801 Governor". A New Nation Votes. American Antiquarian Society.
