= 1804 Delaware gubernatorial election =

- October 2, 1804
Nominee	Nathaniel Mitchell	Joseph Haslet
Party	Federalist	Democratic-Republican
Popular vote	4,391	4,050
Percentage	52.01%	47.97%
- Mitchell: 50–60% 60–70% Haslet: 60–70%
Governor before election
David Hall
Democratic-Republican
Elected Governor
Nathaniel Mitchell
Federalist

The 1804 Delaware gubernatorial election was held on October 2, 1804. The Federalist prothonotary from Sussex County Nathaniel Mitchell defeated the Democratic-Republican candidate Joseph Haslet.

== General election ==
=== Results ===
1804 Delaware gubernatorial election
Party	Candidate	Votes	%	±%
Federalist	Nathaniel Mitchell	4,391	52.01	▲2.14
Democratic-Republican	Joseph Haslet	4,050	47.97	▼2.16
Democratic-Republican	John Dickison	2	0.02	
Total votes		8,443	100.00	
Federalist gain from Democratic-Republican				

=== Results by county ===
1804 Delaware gubernatorial election by county
County	Nathaniel Mitchell Federalist		Joseph Haslet Democratic-Republican		John Dickinson Democratic-Republican		Margin		Total
County	#	%	#	%	#	%	#	%	Total
Kent	1,362	56.8	1,035	43.2	—		327	1.36	2,397
New Castle	902	31.3	1,974	68.6	2	0.1	-1,072	-37.3	2,878
Sussex	2,127	67.1	1,041	32.9	—		1,086	34.2	3,168
TOTAL	4,391	52.0	4,050	48.0	2	0.0	341	4.0	8,443

== Bibliography ==
- Dubin, Michael J. (2003). United States Gubernatorial Elections, 1776-1860: The Official Results by State and County. Jefferson, NC: McFarland and Company. ISBN 978-0-7864-1439-0.
- Lampi, Philip J. (2012). "Delaware 1804 Governor". A New Nation Votes. American Antiquarian Society.
