= 1804 Kentucky gubernatorial election =

- August 6, 1804
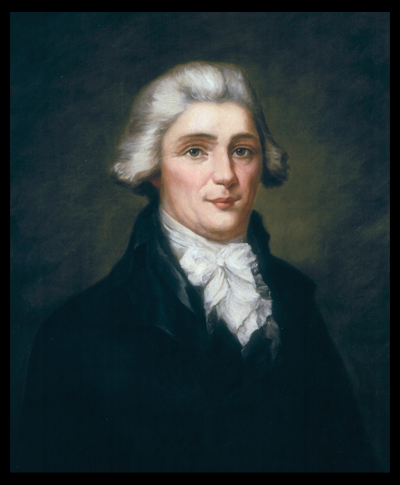
Nominee	Christopher Greenup
Party	Democratic-Republican
Popular vote	25,917
Percentage	100.00%
- Greenup: 100%
Governor before election
James Garrard
Democratic-Republican
Elected Governor
Christopher Greenup
Democratic-Republican

The 1804 Kentucky gubernatorial election was held on August 6, 1804, in order to elect the Governor of Kentucky. Democratic-Republican nominee and former member of the U.S. House of Representatives from Kentucky's 1st district Christopher Greenup was easily elected as he ran unopposed.

== General election ==
On election day, August 6, 1804, Democratic-Republican nominee Christopher Greenup won the election as he ran unopposed, thereby retaining Democratic-Republican control over the office of Governor. Greenup was sworn in as the 3rd Governor of Kentucky on August 28, 1804.

=== Results ===
Kentucky gubernatorial election, 1804
Party	Candidate	Votes	%
Democratic-Republican	Christopher Greenup	25,917	100.00
Total votes		25,917	100.00
Democratic-Republican hold			
