= 1804 United States elections =

- ← 1802 1803 1804 1805 1806 → Presidential election year
- Incumbent president: ▌Thomas Jefferson (DR)
- Next Congress: 9th

Presidential election
- Partisan control: Democratic-Republican hold
- Electoral vote
- Thomas Jefferson (DR): 162
- Charles C. Pinckney (F): 14
- 1804 presidential election results. Green denotes states won by Jefferson, burnt orange denotes states won by Pinckney. Numbers indicate the number of electoral votes allotted to each state.

Senate elections
- Overall control: Democratic-Republican hold
- Seats contested: 11 of 34 seats
- Net seat change: Democratic-Republican +2

House elections
- Overall control: Democratic-Republican hold
- Seats contested: All 142 voting members
- Net seat change: Democratic-Republican +11

Gubernatorial elections
- Seats contested: 13
- Net seat change: +1 Federalist
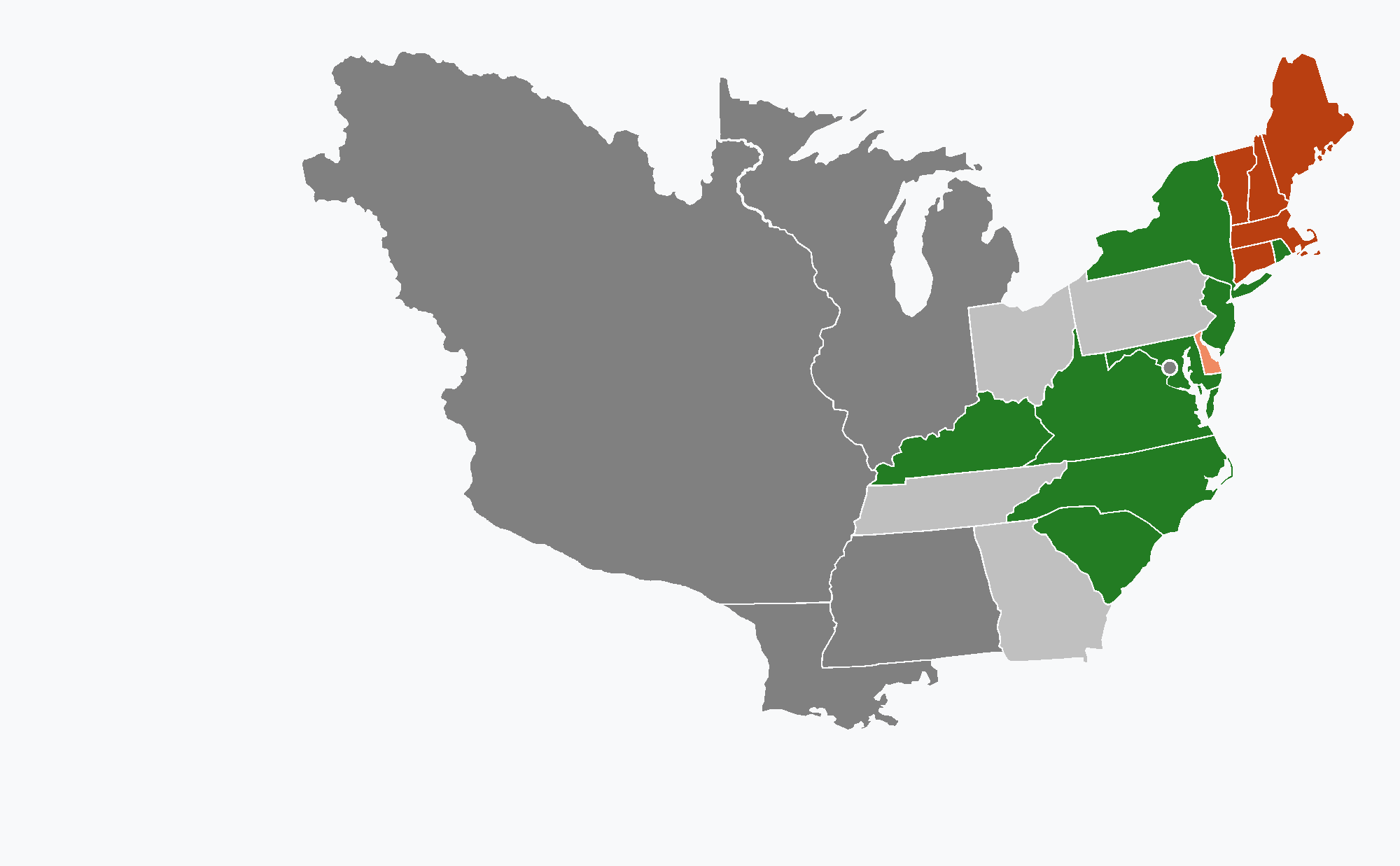
- 1804 gubernatorial election results Democratic-Republican gain Democratic-Republican hold Federalist gain Federalist hold

Elections were held for the 9th United States Congress, in 1804 and 1805. The election took place during the First Party System. The Democratic-Republican Party continued its control of the presidency and both houses of Congress.

In the presidential election, the incumbent Democratic-Republican President Thomas Jefferson easily defeated the Federalist former Governor Charles Pinckney of South Carolina. As the Twelfth Amendment had been ratified in 1804, this was the first election in which electors separately selected a president and a vice president.

In the House, Democratic-Republicans won moderate gains, boosting their already-dominant majority.

In the Senate, Democratic-Republicans made small gains, improving on their commanding majority.

== See also ==
- 1804 United States presidential election
- 1804–05 United States House of Representatives elections
- 1804–05 United States Senate elections
- 1804 United States gubernatorial elections
