= Christopher Greenup =

American politician

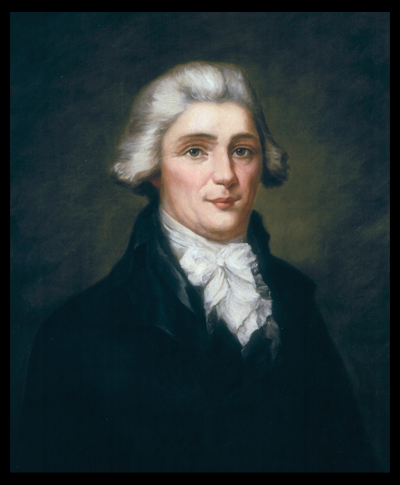
- Christopher Greenup as governor

3rd Governor of Kentucky
- In office September 5, 1804 – September 1, 1808
- Lieutenant: John Caldwell; Thomas Posey
- Preceded by: James Garrard
- Succeeded by: Charles Scott

9th Secretary of State of Kentucky
- In office February 3, 1813 – March 13, 1813
- Governor: Isaac Shelby
- Preceded by: Martin D. Hardin
- Succeeded by: Martin D. Hardin

Member of the Kentucky House of Representatives
- In office 1798

Member of the U.S. House of Representatives from Kentucky's 1st district
- In office November 9, 1792 – March 3, 1797
- Preceded by: New congressional seat
- Succeeded by: Thomas Terry Davis

Member of the Kentucky Senate
- In office 1792

Member of the Virginia House of Delegates
- In office 1785

Personal details
- Born: c. 1750 Fairfax County, Virginia Colony, British America
- Died: April 27, 1818 (aged 67–68) Frankfort, Kentucky, U.S.
- Resting place: Frankfort Cemetery
- Party: Democratic-Republican
- Spouse: Mary Catherine Pope
- Profession: Soldier, Lawyer, Surveyor

Military service
- Allegiance: United States
- Branch/service: Continental Army, Virginia militia
- Rank: Colonel
- Battles/wars: Revolutionary War

Christopher Greenup (c. 1750 – April 27, 1818) was an American politician who served as a U.S. representative and the third governor of Kentucky. Little is known about his early life; the first reliable records about him are documents recording his service in the Revolutionary War, where he served as a lieutenant in the Continental Army and a colonel in the Virginia militia.

After his service in the war, Greenup helped settle the trans-Appalachian regions of Virginia. He became involved in politics, and played an active role in three of the ten statehood conventions that secured the separation of Kentucky from Virginia in 1792. He became one of the state's first representatives, and served in the Kentucky General Assembly before being elected governor in a race where, due to his immense popularity, he ran unopposed.

Greenup's term in office was marred by accusations that he had participated in the Burr Conspiracy to align Kentucky with Spain prior to the former's separation from Virginia, but he vigorously and successfully rebutted these charges. Following his term as governor, he became less active in the political arena. He died on April 27, 1818. Greenup County, Kentucky, and its county seat were both named in his honor.

== Early life in Virginia ==
Christopher Greenup was most likely born in Fairfax County in the Virginia Colony around 1750. (Note: The Biographical Directory of the United States Congress gives Greenup's place of birth as Westmoreland County, Virginia) His early education was attained at the local schools of the area. He learned surveying and studied law under Colonel Charles Binns at Charles City County, Virginia. During the American Revolutionary War, he served in Grayson's Additional Continental Regiment as a lieutenant, and may have seen action at Brandywine and Germantown. He resigned his commission during the Valley Forge encampment in 1778, but later served as a colonel in the Virginia militia.

In 1781, Greenup helped settle the area now known as Lincoln County, Kentucky, where he spent time as a surveyor and a land speculator. He was admitted to practice law in the county court in 1782. Following Virginia's creation of Kentucky County in 1783, he was admitted to the bar of the district court of Harrodsburg and served as clerk from 1785 to 1792. In 1783, he became one of the original trustees of Transylvania Seminary (later to become Transylvania University.) He purchased two lots of land in Lexington and served as the clerk of the town's trustees.

In 1785, Greenup was elected to represent Fayette County for a single term in the Virginia House of Delegates. During his service, he was appointed to a committee with Benjamin Logan and James Garrard to make recommendations on ways to further divide the area that would become Kentucky. The committee was also responsible for revising acts and surveys related to land and water surveys in the area. The committee ultimately recommended the creation of three new counties – Bourbon, Madison, and Mercer. When Mercer County was created later that year, Greenup was appointed a justice there. In 1786, Greenup served as a quartermaster in Benjamin Logan’s expedition against the Shawnees in the Ohio country.

During this time, Greenup continued to practice law in Fayette County and pursued various other interests. He was a founding member of the Danville Political Club and in 1787, he joined the Kentucky Society for Promoting Useful Knowledge. Future Kentucky Governors Isaac Shelby and James Garrard, as well as future Supreme Court justice Thomas Todd were also members of the Society. In 1789, he helped organize the Kentucky Manufacturing Society. Later, he was appointed to the Kentucky River Company, a group dedicated to improving infrastructure on the Kentucky River.

On July 9, 1787, during a brief return to Virginia, Greenup married Mary Catherine ("Cathy") Pope of Hanover County, Virginia; the couple had two children – Nancy and William. (Note: Hopkins states that Greenup's will included six children – two sons and four daughters)

== Political career in Kentucky ==
Greenup served as clerk of the first Kentucky statehood convention in Danville in 1784. He was elected as a delegate to the second and sixth statehood conventions in 1785 and 1788, respectively, and was a trustee of the city of Danville in 1787. H.E. Everman, biographer of fellow delegate James Garrard, noted that despite Greenup's excellent legal background and legislative experience, his lack of oratorical skills prevented him from taking more of a leadership role in the conventions.

When Kentucky was admitted to the Union in 1792, Greenup moved to Frankfort where he was rewarded for his efforts on behalf of the state by being chosen as an elector for the state's senators and governor. He also served in the first Kentucky Senate. Following this, he was appointed to the court of oyer and terminer, but resigned immediately to accept a seat in the U.S. House of Representatives. He was one of Kentucky's first two representatives in the House, and was elected to three successive terms, serving from November 9, 1792, to March 3, 1797. In 1798, he was elected to the Kentucky House of Representatives, representing Mercer County. He also served as clerk of the state senate from 1799 to 1802.

Greenup was a candidate for governor of Kentucky in 1800, but was runner-up to James Garrard in a four-man race that also included Benjamin Logan and Thomas Todd. Greenup garnered a majority of the vote in fifteen counties, just one fewer than Garrard, but Garrard enjoyed strong support in the populous central Kentucky counties and received 8,390 votes, compared with 6,746 for Greenup, 3,996 for Logan, and 2,166 for Todd. Garrard appointed Greenup judge of the circuit court in 1802. After the Kentucky Senate refused to confirm Garrard's Secretary of State, Harry Toulmin, as registrar of the land office, Garrard nominated Greenup. Greenup, however, intended to make another run at the governorship, and at his request, Garrard withdrew the nomination days later.

Greenup resigned his circuit judgeship on June 5, 1804, to make another run for governor. Immensely popular, he ran unopposed, and served as governor from September 4, 1804, to September 1, 1808. During Greenup's administration, the state chartered the Bank of Kentucky and the Ohio Canal Company; Greenup became a director of the former in 1807. Despite his popularity, however, he was unable to pass much of his proposed agenda, which included provision of public education and reforms to the militia, courts, revenue system, and penal system.

A partisan Frankfort newspaper implicated Greenup in the Burr conspiracy, but he successfully defended himself and preserved his reputation. He deployed the Kentucky militia along the Ohio River to defend the state from any threat that might result from the Burr conspiracy, but that threat had largely dissipated by 1807.

Following his term as governor, Greenup was chosen as a presidential elector for the ticket of James Madison and George Clinton. In 1812, he became a justice of the peace in Franklin County. In August 1812, Kentucky Secretary of State Martin D. Hardin recommended to Governor Isaac Shelby that Greenup be appointed Assistant Secretary of State. Shelby made the appointment, and when Hardin, resigned December 15, 1812, Shelby nominated Greenup as his replacement. The Kentucky Senate approved the nomination on February 3, 1813, and Greenup served until his resignation on March 13, 1813.

== Personal life and death ==
On October 22, 1807, Greenup's wife Mary died in the Governor's Mansion. According to legend, her ghostly image has appeared in clock faces and mirrors inside the mansion.

Greenup died April 27, 1818, at Blue Lick Springs Resort, where he had traveled seeking relief from his rheumatism. He is buried in the Frankfort Cemetery. Greenup County, Kentucky, was named in his honor, as was its county seat of Greenup, Kentucky.

== Footnotes ==
U.S. House of Representatives
Preceded by District created	Member of the U.S. House of Representatives from Kentucky's 1st congressional district 1792–1797	Succeeded by Thomas T. Davis
Political offices
Preceded by James Garrard	Governor of Kentucky; 1804–1808	Succeeded by Charles Scott
Preceded by Martin D. Hardin	Secretary of State of Kentucky; 1813	Succeeded by Martin D. Hardin
