= 1804 Rhode Island gubernatorial election =

- April 4, 1804
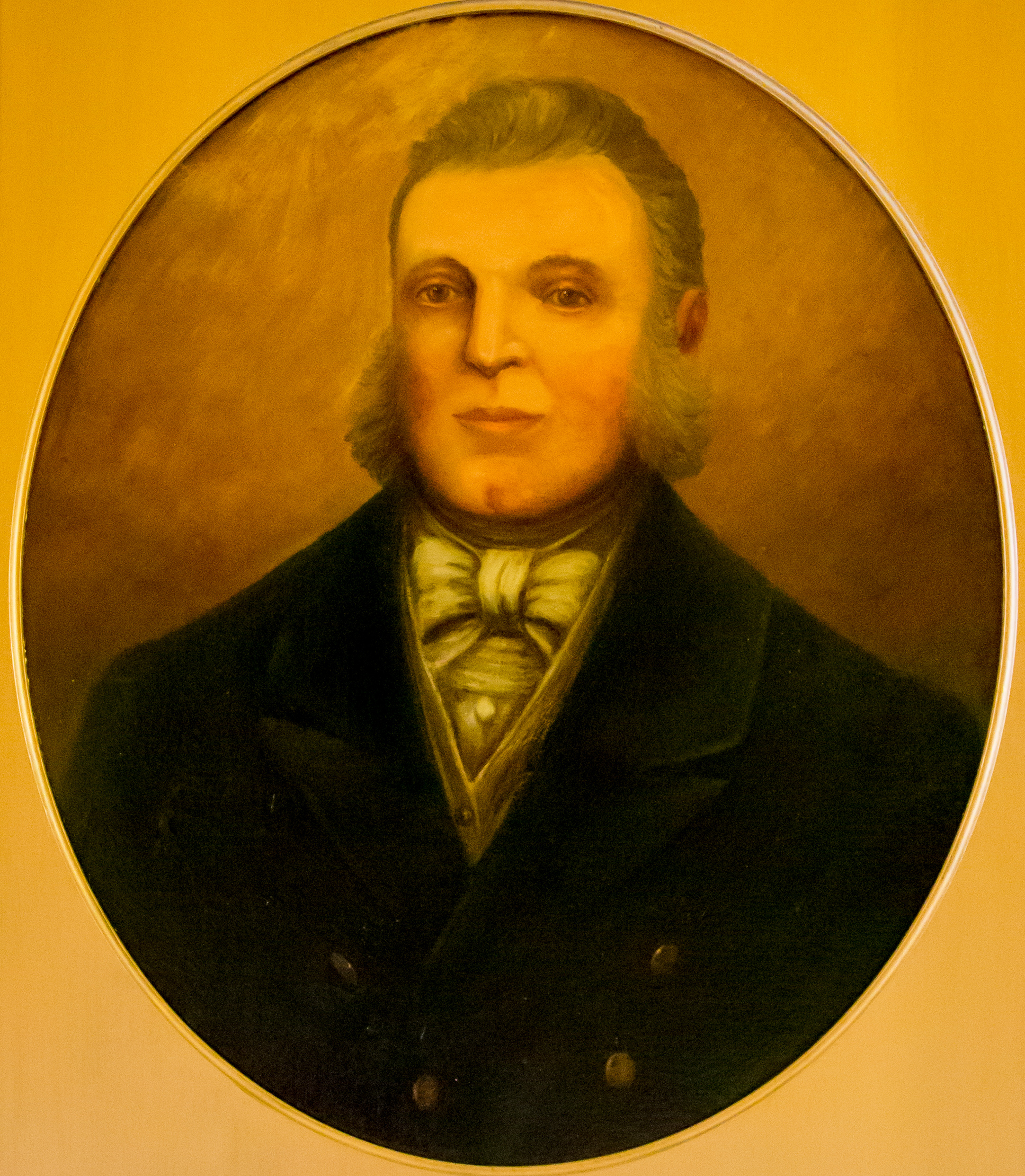
Nominee	Arthur Fenner
Party	Democratic-Republican
Percentage	100.00%
- County results Fenner: 90–100%
Governor before election
Arthur Fenner
Democratic-Republican
Elected Governor
Arthur Fenner
Democratic-Republican

The 1804 Rhode Island gubernatorial election was held on April 4, 1804, in order to elect the governor of Rhode Island. Incumbent Democratic-Republican governor Arthur Fenner won re-election as he ran unopposed. The exact number of votes cast in this election are unknown.

== General election ==
On election day, April 4, 1804, incumbent Democratic-Republican governor Arthur Fenner won re-election as he ran unopposed, thereby retaining Democratic-Republican control over the office of governor. Fenner was sworn in for his fifteenth term on May 5, 1804.

=== Results ===
Rhode Island gubernatorial election, 1804
Party	Candidate	Votes	%
Democratic-Republican	Arthur Fenner (incumbent)		100.00
Total votes			100.00
Democratic-Republican hold			
