= 1804 New Jersey gubernatorial election =

- October 30, 1804
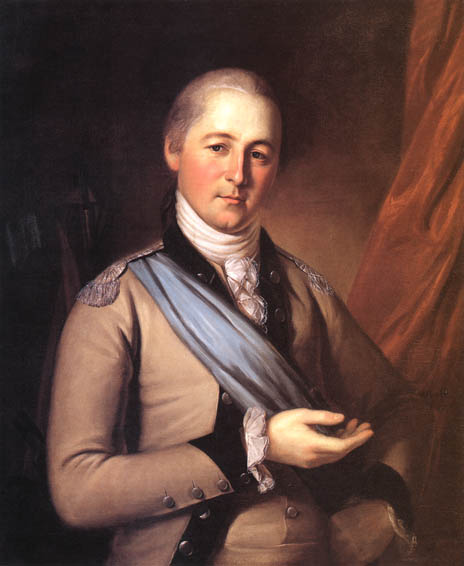

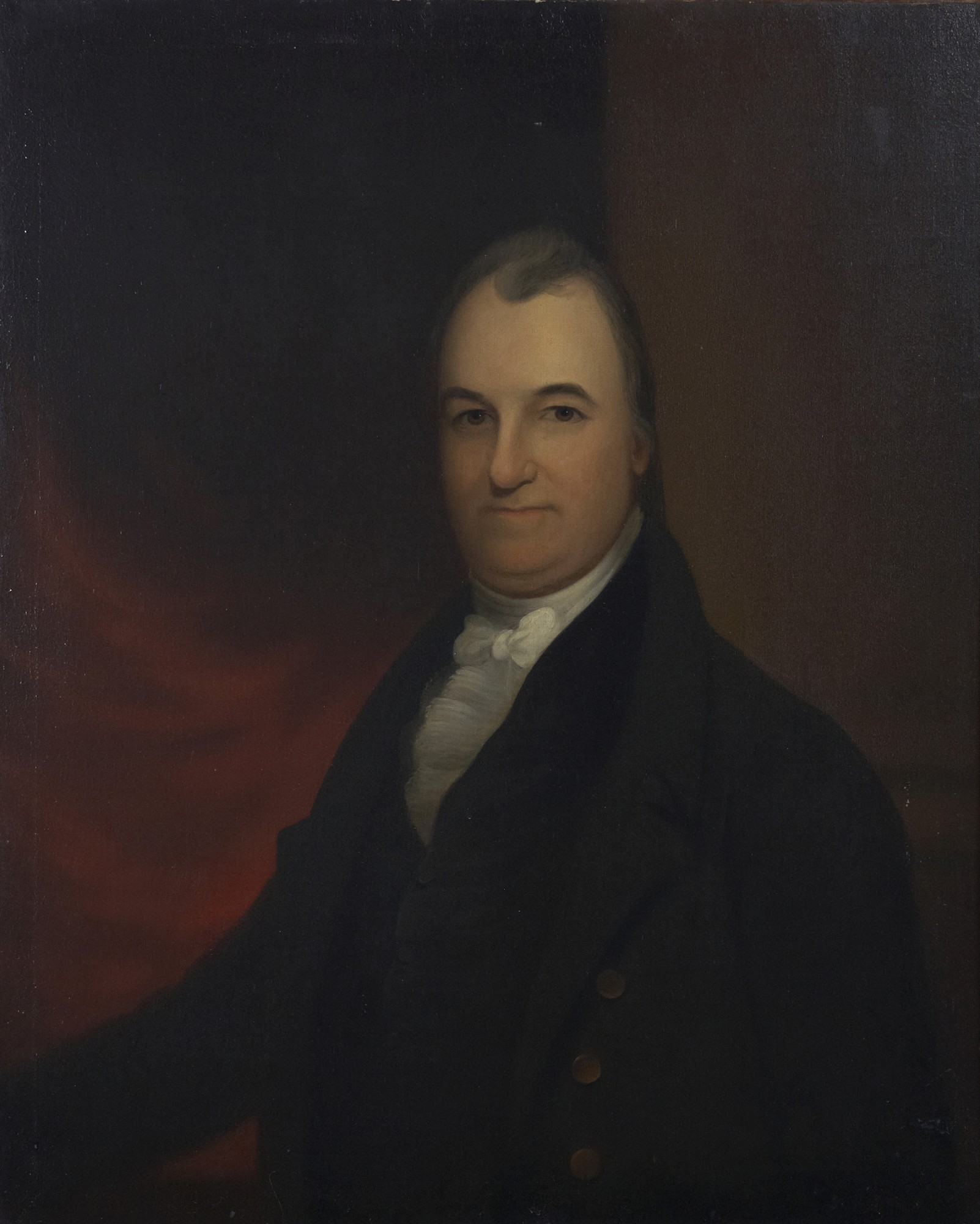
| Nominee | Joseph Bloomfield | Richard Stockton |
| Party | Democratic-Republican | Federalist |
| Popular vote | 37 | 16 |
| Percentage | 69.81% | 30.19% |
Governor before election
Joseph Bloomfield
Democratic-Republican
Elected Governor
Joseph Bloomfield
Democratic-Republican

The 1804 New Jersey gubernatorial election was held on October 30, 1804, in order to elect the governor of New Jersey. Incumbent Democratic-Republican governor Joseph Bloomfield was re-elected by the New Jersey General Assembly against Federalist nominee and former United States senator from New Jersey Richard Stockton in a rematch of the previous election.

== General election ==
On election day, October 30, 1804, incumbent Democratic-Republican governor Joseph Bloomfield was re-elected by the New Jersey General Assembly by a margin of 21 votes against his opponent Federalist nominee Richard Stockton, thereby retaining Democratic-Republican control over the office of governor. Bloomfield was sworn in for his third term that same day.

=== Results ===
New Jersey gubernatorial election, 1804
| Party | Candidate | Votes | % |
|---|---|---|---|
| Democratic-Republican | Joseph Bloomfield (incumbent) | 37 | 69.81% |
| Federalist | Richard Stockton | 16 | 30.19% |
| Total votes | | 53 | 100.00% |
| Democratic-Republican hold | | | |
