= David Hall (Delaware politician) =

American politician (1752–1817)

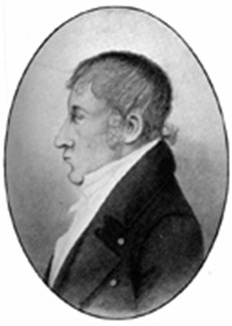

15th Governor of Delaware
- In office January 19, 1802 – January 15, 1805
- Preceded by: James Sykes
- Succeeded by: Nathaniel Mitchell

Personal details
- Born: January 4, 1752 Lewes, Delaware Colony
- Died: September 18, 1817 (aged 65) Lewes, Delaware, U.S.
- Party: Democratic-Republican
- Spouse: Catherine Tingley
- Profession: Lawyer

David Hall (January 4, 1752 – September 18, 1817) was an American lawyer and politician from Lewes, in Sussex County, Delaware. He was an officer in the Continental Army during the American Revolution, and member of the Democratic-Republican Party, who served as Governor of Delaware.

== Early life and family ==
Hall was born in Lewes, Delaware, son of David and Mary Kollock Hall. His grandfather was Nathaniel Hall, who was known as "the Indian Fighter". He came to Delaware from Connecticut in 1700. His father, David Hall Sr., was a well known farmer from around Lewes, who was a Justice of the Peace and a frequent member of the Colonial Assembly from 1753 until the American Revolution. In 1776, David Jr. married Catherine Tingley, daughter of Samuel Tingley, the Rector of St. Peter's Episcopal Church. They had six children: Elizabeth, Mary, Jane, Catherine, Lydia, and Martha. In time he built a home at 107 Kings Highway, across the road from the Zwaanendael Museum. They were members of the Lewes Presbyterian Church.

== Military career ==
Hall studied law and was admitted to the bar in New Castle, Delaware, in 1773. Already a member of the Sussex County militia under General Dagworthy, he joined the 1st Delaware Regiment at the beginning of the War of Independence and served as captain under Colonel John Haslet at the battles of Long Island and White Plains. Following Haslet's death at Princeton in January 1777, he became the leader of the regiment, and was promoted to colonel in April 1777. He led the regiment at the Battle of Brandywine and again at the Battle of Germantown where he was wounded on October 4, 1777. The following year he spent recovering, recruiting new soldiers in Wilmington and serving on courts martial. He returned to active service in June 1779 at the Middlebrook encampment, spent the inactive summer with the regiment, but returned home in October 1779, complaining of his wound and lack of provisioning. When the Delaware Regiment went to South Carolina in April 1780, Hall did not go. Responding to his continuing requests, the General Assembly authorized some payment, but it was never enough, and finally, in April 1782, Hall resigned his commission.

Hall was an original member of the Society of the Cincinnati.

== Political career ==
Meanwhile, Hall pursued his law practice in Lewes and entered politics. He was a Jeffersonian Democrat-Republican, like most Presbyterians, but in Anglican Lewes, he was in the minority. He lost by a vote of 16 to 6 as the Democratic-Republican nominee for the U.S. Senate in 1797 against incumbent Henry Latimer. He was badly beaten by Federalist Richard Bassett when he ran for governor in 1798. He ran again in 1801 against Episcopalian Nathaniel Mitchell, a professed "Deist", and a person openly critical of Methodists. Hall emphasized his Presbyterian faith, and in spite of losing Kent and Sussex counties again badly, he won Presbyterians in New Castle County by such a large margin that he carried the state by 18 votes. The Federalists considered using the recently passed Alien and Sedition Acts to try to nullify some of the recent immigrant New Castle County vote, but with their continued control of the General Assembly, they grudgingly allowed him to take office.

Hall served as governor from January 19, 1802, until January 15, 1805. During this time Pierre Samuel du Pont de Nemours bought the old Jacob Broom cotton mills on Brandywine Creek and began his gunpowder business. This was also the point of the greatest abolitionist sentiment in Delaware, when the General Assembly failed by one vote to enact a gradual emancipation bill.

He was an unsuccessful candidate for the U.S. House in 1805 against James M. Broom; and again in 1812 for the seat won by the Federalist candidate, Thomas Cooper. The next year he was named a judge of the Sussex County Court of Common Pleas.

Delaware General Assembly (sessions while Governor)
Year	Assembly	Senate majority	Speaker	House majority	Speaker
1802	26th	Federalist	Daniel Rogers	Federalist	Stephen Lewis
1803	27th	Federalist	James Sykes	Federalist	Stephen Lewis
1804	28th	Federalist	James Sykes	Federalist	Jesse Green

== Death and legacy ==
Hall died at Lewes, and is buried there in the Lewes Presbyterian Church cemetery.

The Col. David Hall House was added to the National Register of Historic Places in 1976.

== Almanac ==
Elections were held the first Tuesday of October. The governor takes office the third Tuesday of January and had a three-year term. Judges of the Courts of Common Pleas were selected by the General Assembly for the life of the person appointed.

Public offices
Office	Type	Location	Began office	Ended office	Notes
Governor	Executive	Dover	January 19, 1802	January 15, 1805	
Judge	Judiciary	Georgetown	1813	1817	Court of Common Pleas

Election results
Year	Office	Subject	Party	Votes	%	Opponent	Party	Votes	%
1797	U.S. Senator	David Hall	Republican	6	27%	Henry Latimer	Federalist	16	73%
1798	Governor	David Hall	Republican	2,068	44%	Richard Bassett	Federalist	2,490	52%
1801	Governor	David Hall	Republican	3,475	50%	Nathaniel Mitchell	Federalist	3,457	50%
1805	U.S. Representative	David Hall	Republican	2,682	47%	James M. Broom	Federalist	3,011	53%
1812	U.S. Representative	David Hall	Republican	3,221	22%	Henry M. Ridgely	Federalist	4,193	28%

Party political offices
Preceded by Archibald Alexander	Democratic-Republican nominee for Governor of Delaware; 1798, 1801	Succeeded by Joseph Haslet
Political offices
Preceded by James Sykes	Governor of Delaware; 1802–1805	Succeeded by Nathaniel Mitchell
