= 1804 North Carolina gubernatorial election =

- November 24, 1804
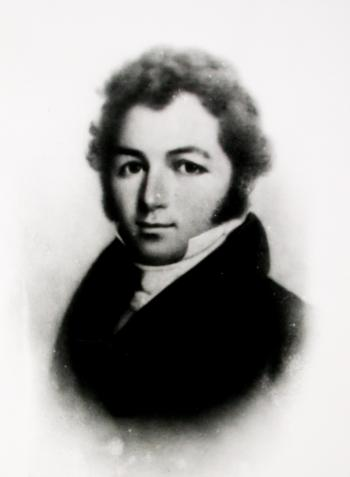
Nominee	James Turner
Party	Democratic-Republican
Popular vote	100
Percentage	99.01%
Governor before election
James Turner
Democratic-Republican
Elected Governor
James Turner
Democratic-Republican

The 1804 North Carolina gubernatorial election was held on November 24, 1804, in order to elect the governor of North Carolina. Incumbent Democratic-Republican governor James Turner was re-elected by the North Carolina General Assembly as he ran unopposed.

== General election ==
On election day, November 24, 1804, incumbent Democratic-Republican governor James Turner was re-elected by the North Carolina General Assembly, thereby retaining Democratic-Republican control over the office of governor. Turner was sworn in for his third term on November 29, 1804.

=== Results ===
North Carolina gubernatorial election, 1804
Party	Candidate	Votes	%
Democratic-Republican	James Turner (incumbent)	100	99.01
	Scattering	1	0.99
Total votes		101	100.00
Democratic-Republican hold			
