= 1804 South Carolina gubernatorial election =

- December 7, 1804
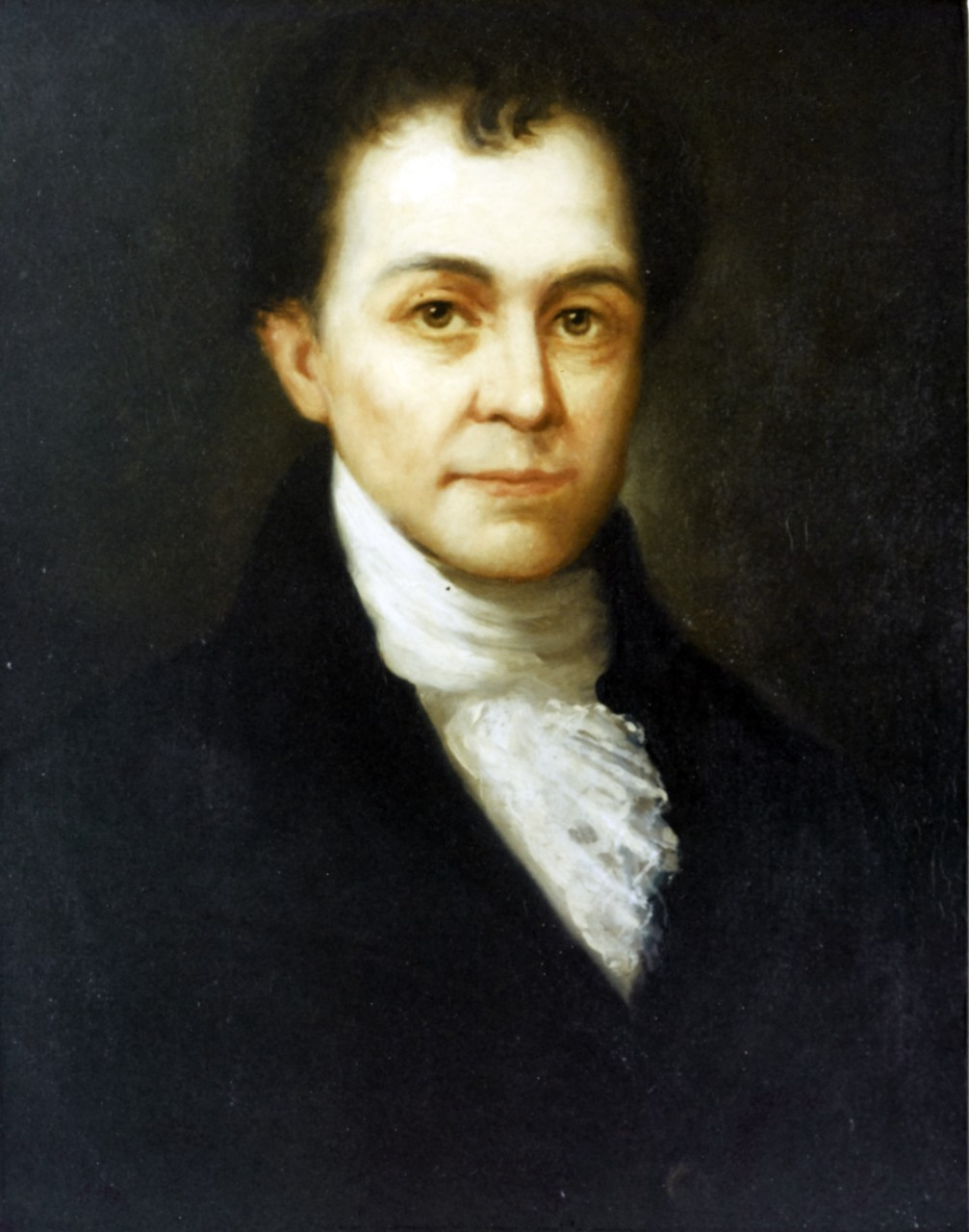
Nominee	Paul Hamilton
Party	Democratic-Republican
Popular vote	1
Percentage	100.00%
Governor before election
James Burchill Richardson
Democratic-Republican
Elected Governor
Paul Hamilton
Democratic-Republican

The 1804 South Carolina gubernatorial election was held on December 7, 1804, in order to elect the Governor of South Carolina. Democratic-Republican candidate and former South Carolina Comptroller General Paul Hamilton was elected by the South Carolina General Assembly as he ran unopposed. The exact number of votes cast in this election is unknown.

== General election ==
On election day, December 7, 1804, Democratic-Republican candidate Paul Hamilton was elected by the South Carolina General Assembly, thereby retaining Democratic-Republican control over the office of Governor. Hamilton was sworn in as the 42nd Governor of South Carolina on January 3, 1805.

=== Results ===
South Carolina gubernatorial election, 1804
Party	Candidate	Votes	%
Democratic-Republican	Paul Hamilton	1	100.00%
Total votes		1	100.00%
Democratic-Republican hold			
