= 1804 Massachusetts gubernatorial election =

- April 2, 1804
- Turnout: 12.82% of population (▲2.55)
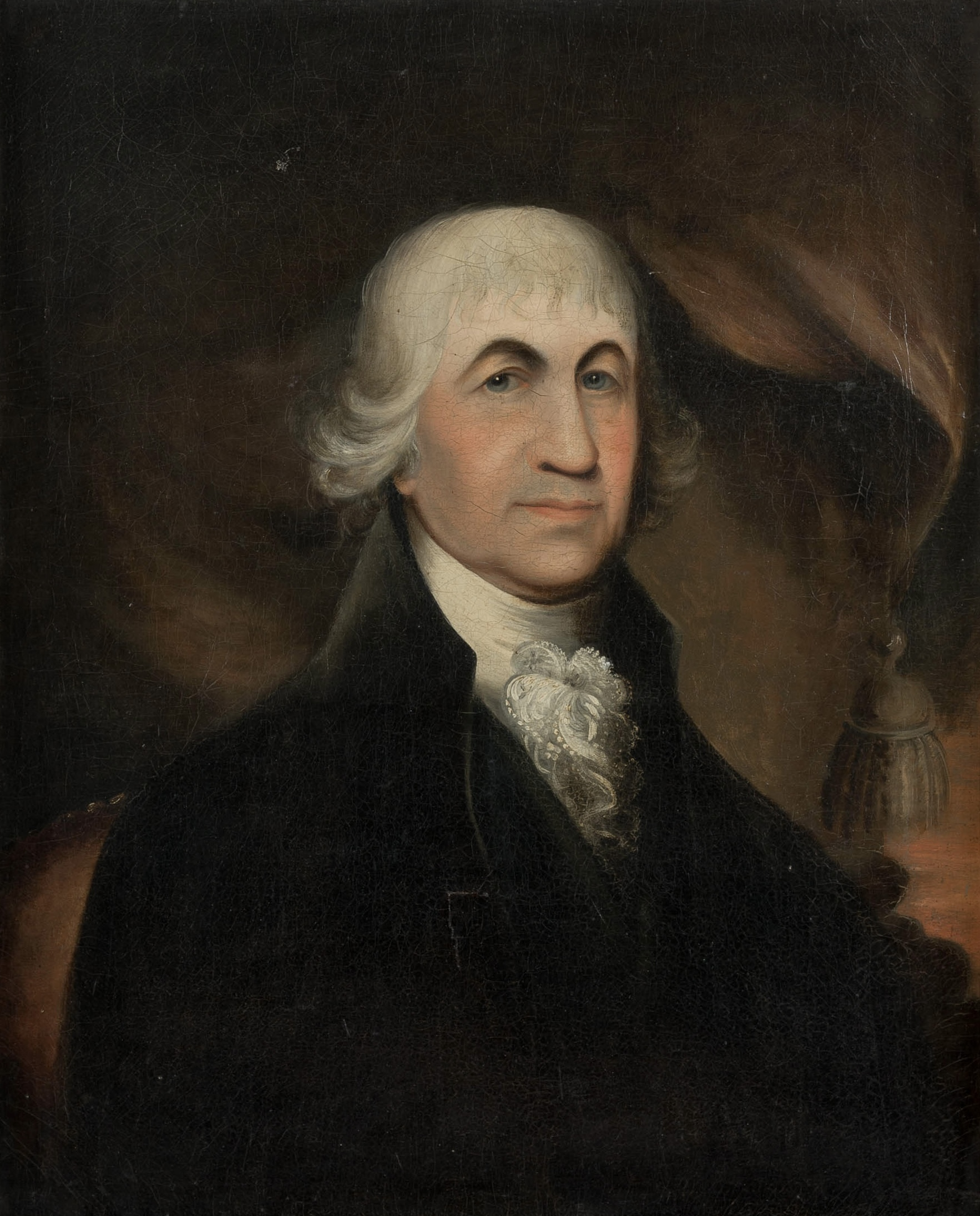

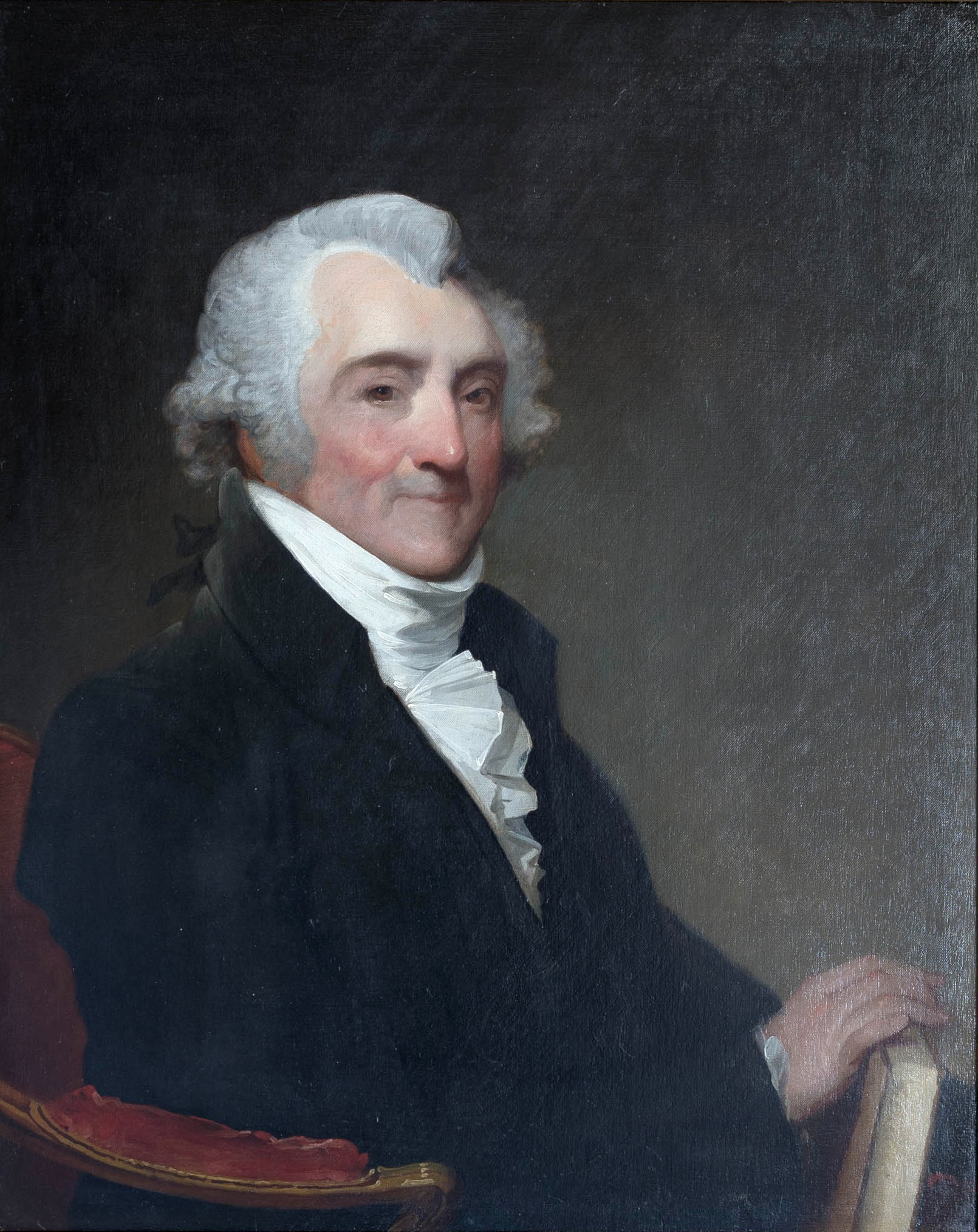
Nominee	Caleb Strong	James Sullivan
Party	Federalist	Democratic-Republican
Popular vote	30,041	24,368
Percentage	55.02%	44.63%
- County results Strong: 50–60% 60–70% 70–80% 80–90% Sullivan: 50–60% 60–70%
Governor before election
Caleb Strong
Federalist
Elected Governor
Caleb Strong
Federalist

The 1804 Massachusetts gubernatorial election was held on April 2.

Federalist Governor Caleb Strong was re-elected to a fifth consecutive one-year term in office, defeating Democratic-Republican James Sullivan.

== General election ==
=== Results ===
1804 Massachusetts gubernatorial election
Party	Candidate	Votes	%	±%
Federalist	Caleb Strong (incumbent)	30,041	55.02%	
Democratic-Republican	James Sullivan	24,368	44.63%	
Others	Scattering	195	0.36%	
Total votes		54,604	100.00%	
Federalist hold		Swing		
