= James Garrard =

American politician (1749–1822)

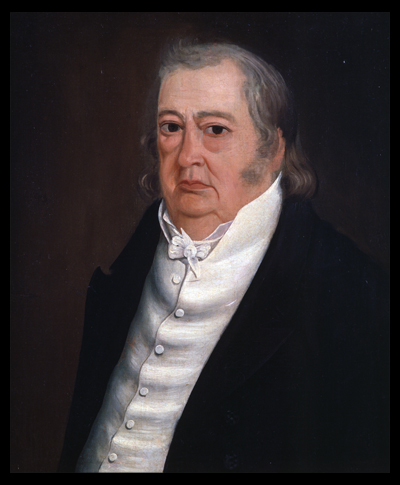
- James Garrard portrait in 1818

2nd Governor of Kentucky
- In office June 7, 1796 – September 5, 1804
- Lieutenant: Alexander Scott Bullitt
- Preceded by: Isaac Shelby
- Succeeded by: Christopher Greenup

Personal details
- Born: January 14, 1749 Stafford County, Colony of Virginia
- Died: January 9, 1822 (aged 72) Bourbon County, Kentucky, U.S.
- Party: Democratic-Republican
- Spouse: Elizabeth Mountjoy
- Relations: Grandfather of James H. Garrard, Kenner Garrard, and Theophilus T. Garrard
- Profession: Soldier, minister, farmer, lumber miller, distiller

Military service
- Allegiance: United States
- Branch/service: Virginia militia
- Rank: Colonel
- Battles/wars: Revolutionary War

James Garrard (/ˈɡærərd/ GARR-ərd; January 14, 1749 – January 9, 1822) was an American farmer, Baptist minister and politician who served as the second governor of Kentucky from 1796 to 1804. Because of term limits imposed by the state constitution adopted in 1799, he was the last Kentucky governor elected to two consecutive terms until the restriction was eased by a 1992 amendment, allowing Paul E. Patton's re-election in 1999.

After serving in the Revolutionary War, Garrard moved west to the part of Virginia that is now Bourbon County, Kentucky. He held several local political offices and represented the area in the Virginia House of Delegates. He was chosen as a delegate to five of the ten statehood conventions that secured Kentucky's separation from Virginia and helped write the state's first constitution. Garrard was among the delegates who unsuccessfully tried to exclude guarantees of the continuance of slavery from the document. In 1795, he sought to succeed Isaac Shelby as governor. In a three-way race, Benjamin Logan received a plurality, but not a majority, of the electoral votes cast. Although the state constitution did not specify whether a plurality or a majority was required, the electors held another vote between the top two candidates – Logan and Garrard – and on this vote, Garrard received a majority. Logan protested Garrard's election to state attorney general John Breckinridge and the state senate, but both claimed they had no constitutional power to intervene.

A Democratic-Republican, Garrard opposed the Alien and Sedition Acts and favored passage of the Kentucky Resolutions. He lobbied for public education, militia and prison reforms, business subsidies, and legislation favorable to the state's large debtor class. In 1798, the state's first governor's mansion was constructed, and Garrard became its first resident. Due in part to the confusion resulting from the 1795 election, he favored calling a constitutional convention in 1799. Because of his anti-slavery views, he was not chosen as a delegate to the convention. Under the resulting constitution, the governor was popularly elected and was forbidden from succeeding himself in office, although Garrard was personally exempted from this provision and was re-elected in 1799. During his second term, he applauded Thomas Jefferson's purchase of Louisiana from France as a means of dealing with the closure of the port at New Orleans to U.S. goods. Late in his term, his Secretary of State, Harry Toulmin, persuaded him to adopt some doctrines of Unitarianism, and he was expelled from the Baptist church, ending his ministry. He also clashed with the legislature over the appointment of a registrar for the state land office, leaving him embittered and unwilling to continue in politics after the conclusion of his term. He retired to his estate, Mount Lebanon, and engaged in agricultural and commercial pursuits until his death on January 19, 1822. Garrard County, Kentucky, created during his first term, was named in his honor.

== Early life and family ==
James Garrard was born in Stafford County, Virginia, on January 14, 1749. He was second of three children born to Colonel William and Mary (Naughty) Garrard.^{[a]} Garrard's mother died sometime between 1755 and 1760; afterward, his father married Elizabeth Moss, and the couple had four more children. William Garrard was the county lieutenant of Stafford County, by virtue of which he held the rank of colonel and was in command of the county militia. The Garrard family was moderately wealthy, and the Stafford County courthouse was built on their land. During his childhood, James worked on his father's farm. He was educated in the common schools of Stafford County and studied at home, acquiring a fondness for books. Early in life, he associated himself with the Hartwood Baptist Church near Fredericksburg, Virginia.

On December 20, 1769, Garrard married his childhood sweetheart, Elizabeth Mountjoy. Shortly thereafter, his sister Mary Anne married Mountjoy's brother, Colonel John Mountjoy. Garrard and his wife had five sons and seven daughters. One son and two daughters died before reaching age two. Of the surviving four sons, all participated in the War of 1812 and all served in the Kentucky General Assembly. A number of his grandsons served in the Civil War, including Union Generals Kenner Garrard and Theophilus T. Garrard. Another grandson, James H. Garrard, was elected to five consecutive terms as state treasurer, serving from 1857 until his death in 1865.

Garrard served in the Revolutionary War as a member of his father's Stafford County militia, although it is not known how much combat he participated in. While on board a schooner on the Potomac River, he was captured by British forces. His captors offered to free him in exchange for military information, but he refused the offer and later escaped.

While serving in the militia in 1779, Garrard was elected to represent Stafford County at the Virginia House of Delegates, and he assumed his seat for the 1779 legislative session. His major contribution to the session was advocating for a bill that granted religious liberty to all residents of Virginia; passage of the bill ended persecution by citizens who associated with the Church of England towards followers of other faiths and countered an effort by some to establish the Church of England as Virginia's official church. After the session, he returned to his military duties. In 1781, he was promoted to the rank of colonel.

== Resettlement in Kentucky ==
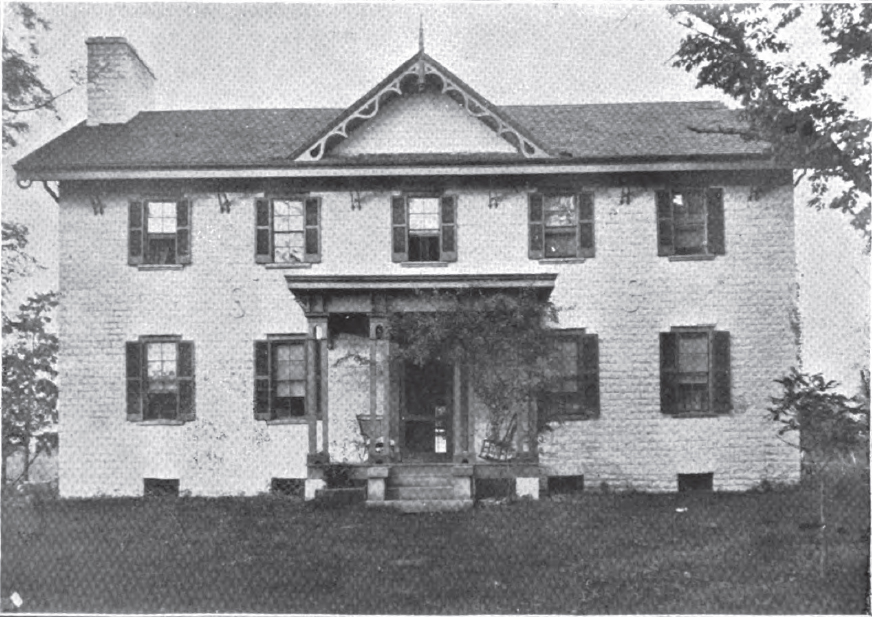
Mount Lebanon, Garrard's Bourbon County estate

Following the revolution, Garrard faced the dual challenges of a growing family and depleted personal wealth. Acting on favorable reports from his former neighbor, John Edwards, Garrard and Samuel Grant headed west into the recently created Kentucky County. By virtue of his military service, Garrard was entitled to claim any vacant land he surveyed and recorded at the state land office. Beginning in early 1783, Garrard made claims for family and friends, as well as 40,000 acres (160 km^{2}) for himself. Later in 1783, he moved his family to the land he had surveyed in Fayette County, which had been created from Kentucky County since his last visit to the region. Three years later, he employed John Metcalfe, a noted stonemason and older half-brother of future Kentucky Governor Thomas Metcalfe, to build his estate, Mount Lebanon, on the Stoner Fork of the Licking River. There, he engaged in agriculture, opened a grist mill and a lumber mill, and distilled whiskey. In 1784, he enlisted in the Fayette County militia.

In 1785, Garrard was elected to represent Fayette County in the Virginia legislature. He was placed on a legislative committee with Benjamin Logan and Christopher Greenup to draft recommendations regarding the further division of Kentucky County. The committee recommended the creation of three new counties, including Madison, Mercer, and Garrard's county of residence, Bourbon. On his return from the legislature, Garrard was chosen county surveyor and justice of the peace for the newly formed county. At various times, he also served as magistrate and colonel of the county militia.

Although some historians have identified Garrard as a member of the Danville Political Club, a secret debating society that was active in Danville, Kentucky, from 1786 to 1790, his name is not found in the club's official membership records. Garrard's biographer, H. E. Everman, concludes that these historians may have mistaken Garrard's membership in the Kentucky Society for the Promotion of Useful Knowledge for membership in the Danville Political Club. The groups had similar aims, were active at about the same time, and had several members in common. Other notable members of the Kentucky Society for the Promotion of Useful Knowledge included Isaac Shelby, Christopher Greenup, and Thomas Todd, all future Kentucky governors or gubernatorial candidates.

Garrard's Mount Lebanon estate was designated as the temporary county seat of Bourbon County; the county court first convened there on May 15, 1786, and continued to meet there for many years. In 1789, the Virginia legislature established a permanent county seat named Hopewell, and Garrard was part of the committee chosen to survey the area for the city. He and John Edwards were among the new settlement's first trustees. Upon Garrard's recommendation, the city's name was changed to Paris in 1790. Soon after, he resigned as county surveyor to focus on more pressing needs of defense for the fledgling settlement. At his behest, the Bourbon County Court expanded its militia from one battalion to two at its meeting in August 1790.

== Religious leadership ==
As early as June 25, 1785, Garrard and his friend Augustine Eastin attended meetings of the Elkhorn Baptist Association. In 1787, he helped organize the Cooper's Run Baptist Church near his estate. He was chosen as one of the church's elders and served the congregation there for ten years. Soon after its formation, the church joined the Elkhorn Baptist Association, and in 1789, it issued Garrard a license to preach. Although he owned as many as 23 slaves to work on his vast agricultural and industrial works, Garrard condemned slavery from the pulpit, calling it a "horrid evil". Whites and blacks participated equally in worship at Cooper's Run.

Garrard and the other elders of the church started numerous congregations in the state, including one as far away as Mason County. In 1789, Garrard and Eastin began working to reunite the more orthodox Regular Baptists in the area with the more liberal Separatist Baptists. Garrard's former church in Virginia had been a Regular Baptist congregation, and Garrard was considered a Regular Baptist despite his clear advocacy for religious toleration and his open expression of liberal views. Although he never succeeded in uniting the two factions, he was chosen moderator of the Elkhorn Baptist Association's annual meetings in 1790, 1791, and 1795 in recognition of his efforts.

From 1785 to 1799, Garrard served as a trustee of Transylvania Seminary (now Transylvania University). In 1794, the Baptist and more liberal trustees united against the orthodox Presbyterian members of the board to elect the seminary's first non-Presbyterian president. That president was Harry Toulmin, a Unitarian minister from England. Toulmin's daughter Lucinda would later marry Garrard's son Daniel. As a result of Garrard's relationship with Toulmin, he began to accept some tenets of Unitarianism, specifically the doctrines of Socinianism. By 1802, Garrard and Augustine Eastin had not only adopted these beliefs, but had indoctrinated their Baptist congregations with them. The Elkhorn Baptist Association condemned these beliefs as heretical and encouraged Garrard and Eastin to abandon them. When that effort failed, the Association ceased correspondence and association with both men. This event ended Garrard's ministry and his association with the Baptist church.

== Political career ==
Residents of what is now Kentucky called a series of ten conventions in Danville to arrange their separation from Virginia. Garrard was a delegate to five of these conventions, held in May and August 1785 and in 1787, 1788, and 1792. At the August 1785 convention, the delegates unanimously approved a formal request for constitutional separation. As a member of the Virginia legislature, Garrard then traveled to Richmond for the legislative session and voted in favor of the act specifying the conditions under which Virginia would accept Kentucky's separation.

Before the final convention in 1792, a committee composed of Garrard, Ambrose Dudley, and Augustine Eastin reported to the Elkhorn Baptist Association in favor of forbidding slavery in the constitution then being drafted for the new state. Slavery was a major issue in the 1792 convention that finalized the document. Delegate David Rice, a Presbyterian minister, was the leading voice against the inclusion of slavery protections in the new constitution, while George Nicholas argued most strenuously in favor of them. Garrard encouraged his fellow ministers and Baptists to vote against its inclusion. The motion to delete Article 9 of the proposed document, which protected the rights of slave owners, failed by a vote of 16–26. Each of the seven Christian ministers who served as delegates to the convention (including Garrard) voted in favor of deleting the article. Five Baptist laymen defied Garrard's instructions and voted to retain Article 9; their votes provided the necessary margin for its inclusion. Historian Lowell H. Harrison wrote that the anti-slavery votes of the ministers may have accounted for the adoption of a provision that forbade ministers from serving in the Kentucky General Assembly. Garrard and the other ministers apparently expressed no dissent against this provision.

Aside from his opposition to slavery, Garrard did not take a particularly active role in the convention's proceedings. His most notable action not related to slavery occurred on April 13, 1792, when he reported twenty-two resolutions from the committee of the whole that provided the framework for the new constitution.

=== Gubernatorial election of 1795 ===
Following the constitutional convention, it appeared that Garrard's political career was drawing to a close. He resigned all of his county offices to focus on his work in the Elkhorn Baptist Convention and his agricultural pursuits. He was pleased, however, when his son William was chosen to represent the county in the state legislature in 1793. In 1795, William Garrard was reelected, and the other four state legislators from Bourbon County were close associates of Garrard's, including John Edwards, who had recently been defeated for reelection to the U.S. Senate.

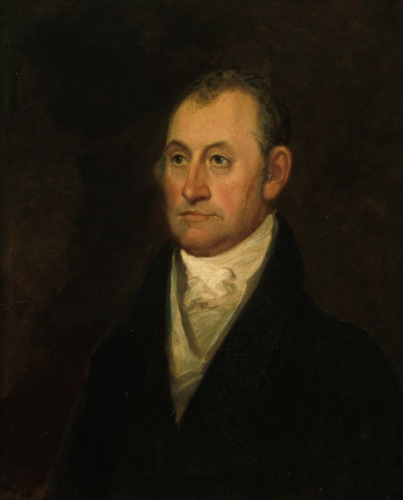
Thomas Todd, one of the candidates in the 1795 gubernatorial election

When Governor Isaac Shelby announced he would not seek reelection, Garrard's friends encouraged him to become a candidate. The other announced candidates were Benjamin Logan and Thomas Todd. Logan was considered the favorite in the race due to his military heroism while helping settle the Kentucky frontier. However, his oratory was unpolished, and his parliamentary skills were weak, despite his considerable political experience. Todd, who had served as secretary of all ten Kentucky statehood conventions, had the most political experience, but his youth was considered a disadvantage by some. Garrard benefited from his political connections in Bourbon County, and many held him in high regard due to his work in the Baptist church.

Under the new constitution, each of Kentucky's legislative districts chose an elector, and these electors voted to choose the governor. Both Logan and Garrard were chosen as electors from their respective counties. On the first ballot, Logan received the votes of 21 electors, Garrard received 17, and Todd received 14. A lone elector cast his vote for John Brown, a Frankfort attorney who would soon be elected to the U.S. Senate. Some speculated that Garrard's moral character prevented him from voting for himself, but his political acumen prevented him from voting for a rival, so he voted for Brown, who had not declared his candidacy. No proof exists that this was the case, however.

The constitution did not specify whether a plurality or a majority vote was required to elect the governor, but the electors, following a common practice of other states, decided to hold a second vote between Logan and Garrard in order to achieve a majority. Most of Todd's electors supported Garrard on the second vote, giving him a majority. In a letter dated May 17, 1796, Kentucky Secretary of State James Brown certified Garrard's election, and Governor Shelby sent him a letter of congratulations on his election on May 27.

Although he did not believe Garrard had personally done anything wrong, Logan formally protested the outcome of the election to Kentucky Attorney General John Breckinridge. Breckinridge refused to render an official decision on the matter, claiming that neither the constitution nor the laws of the state empowered him to do so. Privately, however, he expressed his opinion that Logan had been legally elected. Logan then appealed to the state senate, which was given the authority to intervene in disputed elections. In November 1796, the Senate opined that the law giving them that authority was unconstitutional because it did not promote the "peace and welfare" of the state. State senator Green Clay was the primary proponent of this line of reasoning. By this time, Garrard had been serving as governor for five months, and Logan abandoned the quest to unseat him.

=== First term as governor ===
Garrard was regarded as a strong chief executive who surrounded himself with knowledgeable advisors. His friend, John Edwards, and his son, William Garrard, were both in the state senate and kept him abreast of issues there. He showed that he was willing to continue with Shelby's direction for the state by re-appointing Secretary of State James Brown, but the aging Brown retired in October 1796, only a few months into Garrard's term. Garrard then appointed Harry Toulmin, who had resigned the presidency of Transylvania Seminary in April due to opposition from the institution's more conservative trustees. Although he did not retain outgoing Attorney General John Breckinridge, who had sided with Logan in the disputed gubernatorial election, Garrard still frequently consulted with him on complex legal questions.

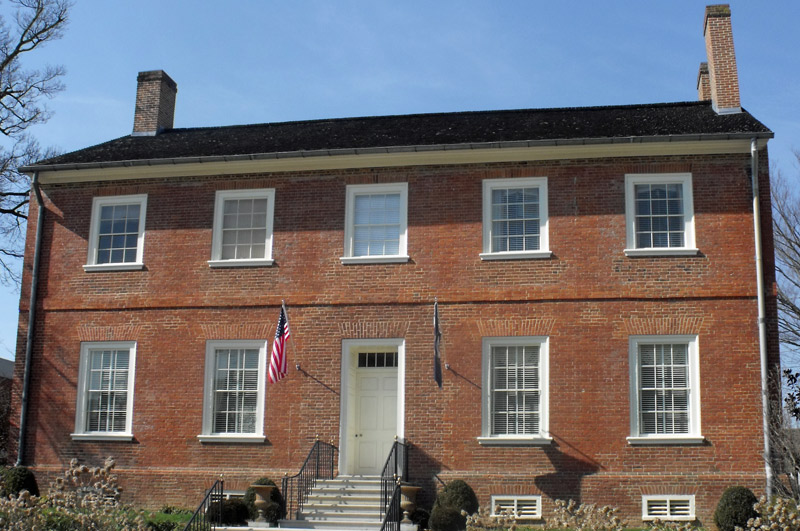
Kentucky's first governor's mansion was constructed during Garrard's first term.

During Governor Shelby's term, the General Assembly had passed laws requiring that the governor, auditor, treasurer, and secretary of state live in Frankfort and allocating a sum of 100 pounds to rent living quarters for the governor. Shortly after Garrard took office, the state commissioners of public buildings reported to the legislature that it would be more financially sensible to construct a house for the governor and his large family than to rent living quarters for them for the duration of his term. On December 4, 1796, the General Assembly passed legislation appropriating 1,200 pounds for the construction of such a house. The state's first governor's mansion was completed in 1798. Garrard incited considerable public interest when, in 1799, he commissioned a local craftsman to build a piano for one of his daughters; most Kentuckians had never seen such a grand instrument, and a considerable number of them flocked to the governor's mansion to see it when it was finished. Kentucky historian Thomas D. Clark also relates that Garrard's addition of carpeting to the mansion – a rare amenity at the time – drew many visitors and was described by one as "the envy and pride of the community".

Among the other acts passed during the first year of Garrard's term were laws establishing the Kentucky Court of Appeals and a system of lower district courts. For the first time, lawyers in the state were required to be licensed. Six new counties – including one named in Garrard's honor – were created, along with several new settlements. Garrard approved enabling acts creating twenty-six counties; no other Kentucky governor oversaw the creation of as many.

Left undone, however, was extending the laws dealing with surveying and registering land claims with the registrar of the state land office. Cognizant that the old law would expire November 30, 1797, Garrard issued a proclamation on November 3 calling the legislature into special session. The legislators convened on November 28, and Garrard, drawing on his experience as a surveyor, addressed them regarding the urgency of adopting a new law and forestalling more lawsuits related to land claims, which were already numerous. Although a wealthy landowner himself, Garrard advocated protecting Kentucky's large debtor class from foreclosure on their lands. Garrard supported pro-squatting legislation, including measures that forbade the collection of taxes from squatters on profits they made from working the land they occupied and that required landowners to pay squatters for any improvements they made on their land. Despite opposition from some aristocratic legislators like John Breckinridge, most of the reforms advocated by Garrard were approved in the session.

Garrard was a member of the Democratic-Republican Party and agreed with party founder Thomas Jefferson's condemnation of the Alien and Sedition Acts. In an address to the General Assembly on November 7, 1798, he denounced the Alien Act on the grounds that it deterred desirable immigration; the Sedition Act, he claimed, denied those accused under its provisions freedom of speech and trial by jury, rights – he pointed out – that he and the other soldiers of the Revolutionary War had fought to secure. He advocated the nullification of both laws, but also encouraged the legislature to reaffirm its loyalty to the federal government and the U.S. Constitution. He was supportive of the Kentucky Resolutions of 1798 and 1799.

Among the other issues addressed in the 1798 General Assembly was the adoption of penal reforms. Garrard was supportive of the reforms – which included the abolition of the death penalty for all crimes except murder – and lobbied for the education of incarcerated individuals. He also secured the passage of laws reforming and expanding the militia. Among the reforms were the imposition of penalties upon "distractors" in the militia, provisions for citizens' hiring of substitutes to serve in the militia on their behalf, and the exemption of jailers, tutors, printers, judges, ministers, and legislative leaders from service. Garrard opposed lowering taxes, instead advocating increased spending on education and business subsidies. To that end, he signed legislation combining Transylvania Seminary and Kentucky Academy into a single institution.

=== A new constitution ===
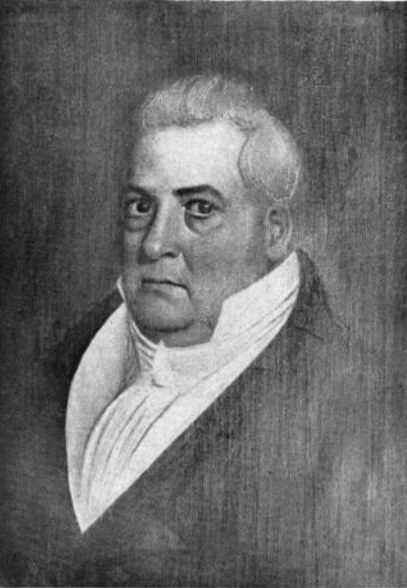
Garrard's son William introduced legislation to call a constitutional convention.

The difficulties with Garrard's election over Benjamin Logan in 1795 added to a litany of complaints about the state's first constitution. Some believed that it was undemocratic because it required electors to choose the governor and state senators and many offices were appointive rather than elective. Others opposed life terms for judges and other state officials. Still others wanted slavery excluded from the document, or to lift the ban on ministers serving in the General Assembly. In the aftermath of the disputed 1795 election, all parties involved agreed that changes were needed. The present constitution provided no means for amendment, however. The only remedy was another constitutional convention.

Calling a constitutional convention required the approval of a majority of voters in two successive elections or a two-thirds majority of both houses of the General Assembly. In February 1797, the General Assembly voted to put the question before the electorate in the upcoming May elections. Of the 9,814 votes cast, 5,446 favored the call and 440 opposed it, but 3,928 had not voted at all, and several counties recorded no votes on the issue either way. This cast doubt in the minds of many legislators regarding the true will of the people. Opponents of the convention claimed that the abstentions should be counted as votes against the call; this position had some merit, as it was well known that many Fayette County voters had abstained as a protest against the convention. When all of the irregularities were accounted for, the General Assembly determined that the vote had fallen short of the required majority.

On February 10, 1798, Garrard's son William, still serving in the state senate, introduced a bill to hold another vote on calling a constitutional convention. In May 1798, 9,188 of the 16,388 votes were in favor of calling a convention. Again, almost 5,000 of the ballots contained no vote either way. On November 21, 1798, the House of Representatives voted 36–15 in favor of a convention, and the Senate provided its requisite two-thirds majority days later. No official tally of the Senate's vote was published. The Assembly's vote rendered moot any doubts about the popular vote.

Delegates to the July 22, 1799, convention were elected in May 1799. Neither Garrard nor his son William were chosen as delegates, mostly due to their anti-slavery views. Garrard had been a more active governor than his predecessor, frequently employing his veto and clashing with the county courts. As a result, the delegates moved to rein in some of the power given to the state's chief executive. Under the 1799 constitution, the governor was popularly elected, and the threshold for overriding a gubernatorial veto was lowered from a two-thirds majority of each house of the legislature to an absolute majority. Although the governor retained broad appointment powers, the state senate was given the power to approve or reject all gubernatorial nominees. New term limits were imposed on the governor, making him ineligible for reelection for seven years following the expiration of his term. The restriction on ministers serving in the legislature was retained and extended to the governor's office. Historian Lowell Harrison held that this restriction was "a clear snub to Garrard", but Garrard biographer H. E. Everman maintained that it was "definitely not a blow aimed at Garrard". Garrard was personally exempted from both the succession and ministerial restrictions, clearing the way for him to seek a second term.

=== 1799 gubernatorial election ===
Confident that the results of the 1795 election would be reversed, Benjamin Logan was the first to declare his candidacy for the governorship in 1799. Garrard and Thomas Todd declared their respective candidacies soon after. Former U.S. Representative Christopher Greenup also sought the office. Many of the recent settlers in Kentucky were unaware of his illustrious military record and unimpressed with his unsophisticated speaking skills. Although the candidates themselves rarely spoke negatively of each other, opponents of each candidate independently raised issues that they felt would hurt that candidate. John Breckinridge, Garrard's long-time political nemesis, tried to goad Garrard into making another impassioned plea for emancipation of slaves, which was a minority position in the state, but Garrard recognized Breckinridge's tactics and refused to express any bold emancipationist sentiments during the campaign. The fact that the slavery protections in the new constitution were even stronger than those in the previous document ensured that the incumbent's previous anti-slavery sentiments were not a major concern to most of the electorate. The family of Henry Field, a prominent leader in Frankfort, attacked Garrard for not issuing a pardon for Field, who was convicted of murdering his wife with an ax. After examining the evidence in the case, Garrard concluded that the verdict was reached justly and without undue outside influence, but the charge was raised so late in the campaign that Garrard's defense of his refusal to issue a pardon could not be circulated widely.

With the advantages of incumbency and a generally popular record, Garrard garnered large majorities in the state's western counties, Jefferson County, and the Bluegrass region of central Kentucky. Surprisingly, he even found support among some voters who had favored Logan four years earlier. The final voting showed Garrard the winner with 8,390 votes, followed by Greenup with 6,746, Logan with 3,996, and Todd with 2,166. Due to the term limits imposed by the new constitution, Garrard was the last Kentucky governor elected to succeed himself until a 1992 amendment to the state constitution loosened the prohibition on gubernatorial succession, and Paul E. Patton was reelected in 1999. In 1801, Garrard nominated Todd to fill the next vacancy on the Kentucky Court of Appeals after the election. Similarly, he appointed Greenup to a position on the Frankfort Circuit Court in 1802.

=== Second term as governor ===
The first two years of Garrard's second term were relatively uneventful, but in the 1802 General Assembly, legislators approved two bills related to the circuit court system that Garrard vetoed. The first bill expanded the number of courts and provided that untrained citizens could sit as judges in the court system. Garrard questioned the cost of the additional courts and the wisdom of allowing untrained judges on the bench; he also objected to the bill's circumvention of the governor's authority to appoint judges. The second bill allowed attorneys and judges in the circuit court system to reside outside the districts they served. The General Assembly overrode Garrard's second veto, marking the first time in Kentucky history that a gubernatorial veto was overridden and the only time during Garrard's eight-year tenure.

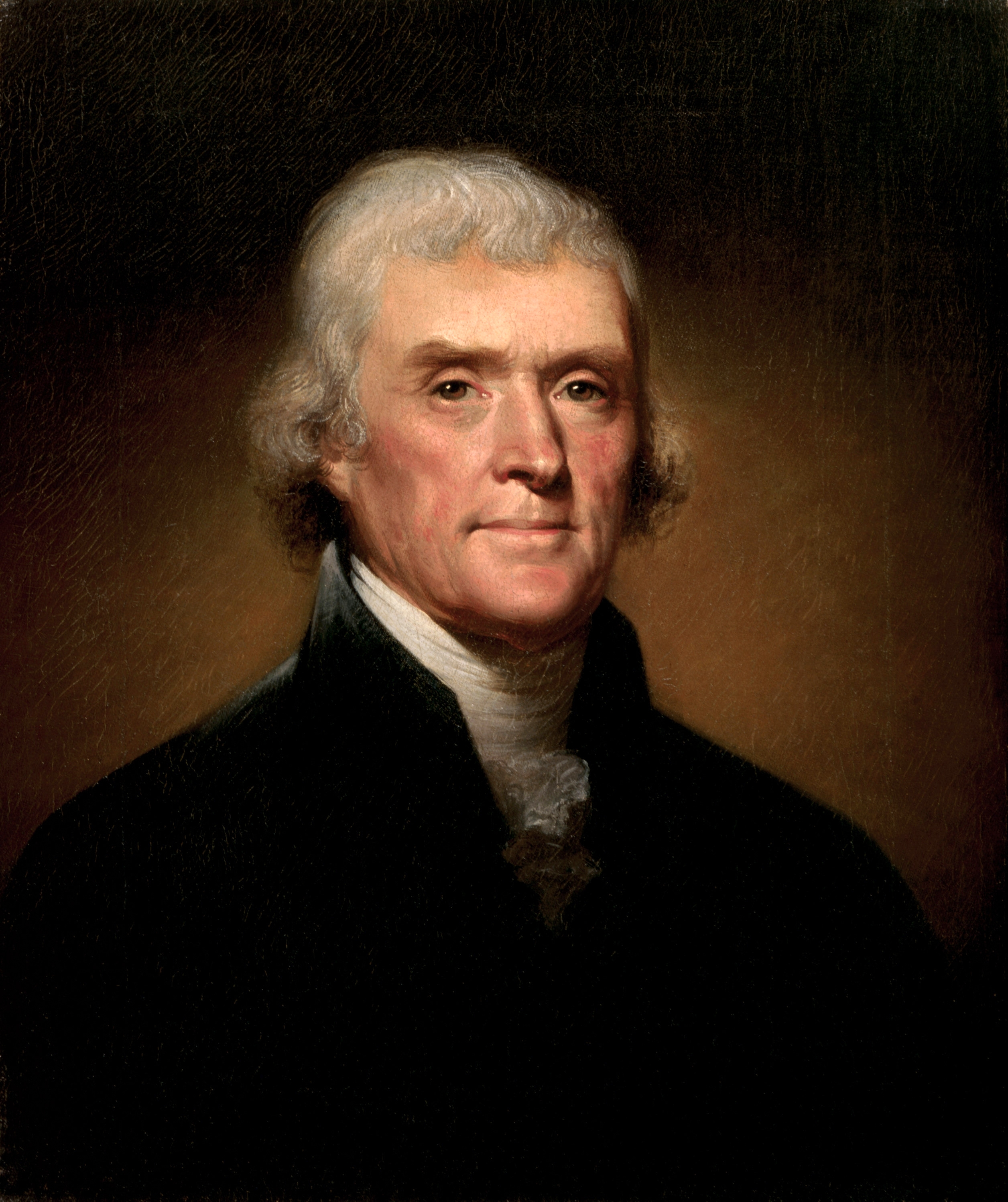
Thomas Jefferson's acquisition of Louisiana was hailed by Garrard as a "noble achievement".

On October 16, 1802, Spanish intendent Don Juan Ventura Morales announced the revocation of the U.S. right of deposit at New Orleans, a right that had been guaranteed under Pinckney's Treaty. The closure of the port to U.S. goods represented a major impediment to Garrard's hopes of establishing a vibrant trade between Kentucky and the other states and territories along the Mississippi River. He urged President Thomas Jefferson to act and publicly declared that Kentucky had 26,000 militiamen ready to take New Orleans by force if necessary. Jefferson was unaware, however, that the secret Treaty of San Ildefonso had ceded control of Louisiana to the French dictator Napoleon Bonaparte in 1800, although a formal transfer had not yet been made. As Jefferson deliberated, Napoleon unexpectedly offered to sell Louisiana to the United States for approximately $15 million. Robert R. Livingston and James Monroe, Jefferson's envoys in France, accepted the offer. The purchase delighted most Kentuckians, and Garrard hailed it as a "noble achievement". Soon after the agreement, the Spanish government claimed that the French had not performed their part of the Treaty of Ildefonso and, as a result, the treaty was nullified and Louisiana still belonged to Spain. Jefferson ignored the Spanish protest and prepared to take Louisiana by force. He instructed Garrard to have 4,000 militiamen ready to march to New Orleans by December 20, 1803. The Kentucky General Assembly quickly passed a measure guaranteeing 150 acres of land to anyone who volunteered for military service, and Garrard was soon able to inform Jefferson that his quota was met. Spain then reversed course, relinquishing its claims to Louisiana, and the territory passed into U.S. control two months later.

The last months of Garrard's second term were marred by a dispute with the General Assembly over naming a new registrar of the state's land office. Garrard first named Secretary of State Harry Toulmin, but the Senate rejected that nomination on December 7, 1803. Next, Garrard nominated former rival Christopher Greenup, but Greenup had designs on succeeding Garrard and asked Garrard to withdraw the nomination, which he did. The Senate then rejected Garrard's next nominee, John Coburn, and accused the next, Thomas Jones, of "high criminal offense" and barred him from any further appointive office.

Following Jones's rejection, Garrard vetoed a bill that would have allowed the legislature to select the state's presidential and vice-presidential electors; despite the fact that the law ran contrary to the state constitution, Garrard's veto further strained his relations with the Senate. After the Senate rejected nominee William Trigg, the state's newspapers openly talked of an executive-legislative feud and claimed the Senate had its own favorite candidate for the position and would not accept anyone else. When the Senate rejected Willis Green in January 1804, Garrard declared that he would make no more nominations for the position. Accusations of bad faith were exchanged between the governor and the Senate, after which Garrard nominated John Adair, the popular Speaker of the House. The Senate finally confirmed this choice.

== Later life and death ==
His dispute with the General Assembly over the naming of a land registrar left Garrard embittered, and he retired from politics at the expiration of his second term. He privately backed Christopher Greenup's bid to succeed him in 1804, and Bourbon County's vote broke heavily for Greenup in the election. Although his sons William and James would continue running for public office into the 1830s, Garrard never indicated a desire to run again.

Garrard returned to Mount Lebanon, where he developed a reputation as a notable agriculturist. His son James oversaw the day-to-day operation of the farm and frequently won prizes for his innovations at local agricultural fairs. The Mount Lebanon estate was badly damaged by one of the New Madrid earthquakes in 1811, but Garrard insisted on repairing the damage as thoroughly as possible in order to reside there for the rest of his life. He imported fine livestock – including thoroughbred horses and cattle – to his farm and invested in several commercial enterprises, including several saltworks, which passed to his sons upon his death. He died on January 9, 1822, following several years of feeble health. He was buried on the grounds of his Mount Lebanon estate, and the state of Kentucky erected a monument over his grave site.

== Notes ==
- ^[a]In her research of the Garrard family, Anna Russell Des Cognets notes that thirteen years elapsed between the birth of Garrard's older brother Daniel and James Garrard. She speculates that other children, who died in infancy, may have been born to Garrard's parents during this period, but notes that she is unable to locate any records confirming this. (Des Cognets, p. 6)

Political offices
Preceded by Isaac Shelby	Governor of Kentucky; 1796–1804	Succeeded by Christopher Greenup
