= George Read =

George Read may refer to:

== Soldiers ==
- George C. Read (1788–1862), United States Navy admiral
- George E. Read (1838–1910), American sailor and Medal of Honor recipient
- George Windle Read (1860–1934), United States Army major general
- George Windle Read Jr. (1900–1974), United States Army lieutenant general, son of the above

== Public officials ==
- George Read (American politician, born 1733) (1733–1798), lawyer, signer of Declaration of Independence and senator from Delaware
- George Read Jr. (1765–1836), lawyer, son of George Read, Sr., U.S. Attorney for Delaware
- George Read III (1787–1836), lawyer, son of George Read, Jr., U.S. Attorney for Delaware
- George Read (New Zealand politician) (1814–1878), English-born mariner and landowner from East Coast
- George Read (Ontario politician) (1819–1903), Canadian businessman and Legislative Assembly of Ontario member
- George Read (Alberta politician) (born 1972), Canadian leader of Alberta Green Party

== See also ==
- George Reid (disambiguation)
- George Reed (disambiguation)
- George Reade (disambiguation)
