= List of National Historic Landmarks in Delaware =

Delaware National Historic Landmarks (clickable map)

This is a List of National Historic Landmarks in Delaware. There are 14 National Historic Landmarks (NHLs) in Delaware.

== Key ==
| | National Historic Landmark |
| ^{†} | National Historic Landmark District |
| ^{#} | National Historic Site, National Historical Park, National Memorial, or National Monument |
| ^{*} | Delisted Landmark |

== NHLs ==
They are distributed over the three counties of Delaware. Following is a complete list:

| | Landmark name | Image | Date designated | Location | County | Description |
|---|---|---|---|---|---|---|
| 1 | Aspendale | Aspendale | April 15, 1970 (#70000170) | Kenton; 39°13′18″N 75°41′09″W | Kent | House and small plantation, intact from 1771. |
| 2 | Jacob Broom House | Jacob Broom House | December 2, 1974 (#74000602) | Montchanin; 39°46′55″N 75°34′34″W | New Castle | Home of constitutional convention delegate Jacob Broom, this historic house is near Brandywine Creek. It is privately owned, near the Hagley Museum and Library. |
| 3 | Corbit-Sharp House | Corbit-Sharp House | December 24, 1967 (#67000004) | Odessa; 39°27′15″N 75°39′24″W | New Castle | House built in 1772 exemplifying influence of late Georgian architecture from Philadelphia into surrounding regions. |
| 4 | John Dickinson House | John Dickinson House | January 20, 1961 (#66000258) | Dover; 39°06′10″N 75°26′58″W | Kent | Delaware home where John Dickinson wrote Letters from a Farmer in Pennsylvania analyzing economic difficulties of colonial America, before the American Revolutionary War |
| 5 | Eleutherian Mills | Eleutherian Mills | November 13, 1966 (#66000259) | Wilmington; 39°46′50″N 75°34′30″W | New Castle | Gunpowder mills along Brandywine Creek founded by Eleuthère Irénée du Pont in 1802. It is part of the Hagley Museum. |
| 6 | Fort Christina | Fort Christina | November 5, 1961 (#66000260) | Wilmington; 39°44′07″N 75°32′18″W | New Castle | This was the first and principal settlement of the New Sweden colony. |
| 7 | Holy Trinity (Old Swedes) Church | Holy Trinity (Old Swedes) Church | November 5, 1961 (#66000261) | Wilmington; 39°44′21″N 75°32′28″W | New Castle | The oldest surviving church from New Sweden, it hosted services in Swedish from 1698 well into the 1800s. |
| 8 | Howard High School | Howard High School | April 5, 2005 (#85000309) | Wilmington; 39°44′48″N 75°32′30″W | New Castle | An all African American high school, this school was subject of Gebhart v. Belton, a desegregation case that was combined with others in the landmark Brown vs. Board of Education decision by the United States Supreme Court. |
| 9 | Lightship LV-118 (Overfalls) | Lightship LV-118 (Overfalls) | June 14, 2011 (#89000006) | Lewes; 38°46′41″N 75°08′28″W | Sussex | Unique lightship was one of few to remain in service during World War II |
| 10 | Lombardy Hall | Lombardy Hall | December 2, 1974 (#72000292) | Fairfax, Brandywine Hundred; 39°46′53″N 75°32′43″W | New Castle | Home of Gunning Bedford Jr., a delegate to constitutional convention and signer of the U.S. Constitution. |
| 11 | New Castle Court House | New Castle Court House | November 28, 1972 (#72000285) | New Castle; 39°39′28″N 75°33′49″W | New Castle | Hosted Delaware's colonial assembly from 1704-1777. |
| 12^{†} | New Castle Historic District | New Castle Historic District | December 24, 1967 (#67000003) | New Castle; 39°39′38″N 75°33′48″W | New Castle | Capital of Delaware colony from 1651 to 1761, having well preserved architecture. |
| 13 | George Read II House | George Read II House | December 23, 2016 (#100000872) | New Castle; 39°39′35″N 75°33′41″W | New Castle | Home of George Read Jr., the first U.S. Attorney for the District of Delaware |
| 14 | Stonum | Stonum | November 7, 1973 (#73000524) | New Castle; 39°39′37″N 75°34′34″W | New Castle | Home of George Read, signer of the Declaration of Independence |

== See also ==
- National Register of Historic Places listings in Delaware
- List of National Historic Landmarks by state
