= George Read III =

American lawyer (1788-1836)

United States Attorney for the District of Delaware
- In office 1816–1836
- President: James Madison; John Quincy Adams; Andrew Jackson
- Preceded by: George Read II
- Succeeded by: James A. Bayard Jr.

Personal details
- Born: June 4, 1788 New Castle, Delaware, U.S.
- Died: November 1, 1836 (aged 49)
- Party: Republican
- Education: Princeton
- Occupation: Lawyer

George Read III (June 4, 1788 – November 1, 1836) was an American lawyer who served as the second U.S. Attorney for the District of Delaware taking over for his father.

== Family ==
George Read III was born in the Read mansion on June 4, 1787, in New Castle, Delaware. His grandfather was George Read, a lawyer and politician who would go on to sign both the Declaration of Independence and the U.S. Constitution. Read's great uncle Thomas was an officer in the Continental Navy during the Revolution and his great uncle James was an officer in the Continental Army and later active in managing the navy under the Articles of Confederation. His paternal grandmother was Gertrude Ross Read, the daughter of Rev. George Ross (the first rector of the Immanuel Episcopal Church on the Green) and the sister of lawyer George Ross, another future signatory to the Declaration. When his father, George Read II was born, Read's grandfather was serving as both the Crown Attorney General for the Delaware Colony as well as a member of the Delaware Assembly. By the time his father turned ten, his grandfather was serving in the Continental Congress in Philadelphia. George Read II was admitted to the bar in 1785 and opened a law office in New Castle. Four years later, he would become the first United States Attorney for the District of Delaware. His uncle, John Read was a noted lawyer and banker of Philadelphia. His mother, Mary Thompson, was the daughter of General William Thompson. George Read III married on 19 April 1810, Louisa Ridgeley Dorsey, whose family resided near Baltimore, Maryland, her father being Dr. Nathan Dorsey, a surgeon in the Continental Navy, who afterwards became an eminent physician in Philadelphia and an original member of The Society of the Cincinnati in the state of Pennsylvania.

== Biography ==
After graduating in 1806 from Princeton University with honors, he studied law with his father, and was called to the bar in Delaware.He served as United States district attorney, during the administrations of three of Presidents. George Read III died in his family's mansion, in New Castle, on November 1, 1837, the same night of his nomination to the United States Senate.
