= Thane Read =

American pacifist

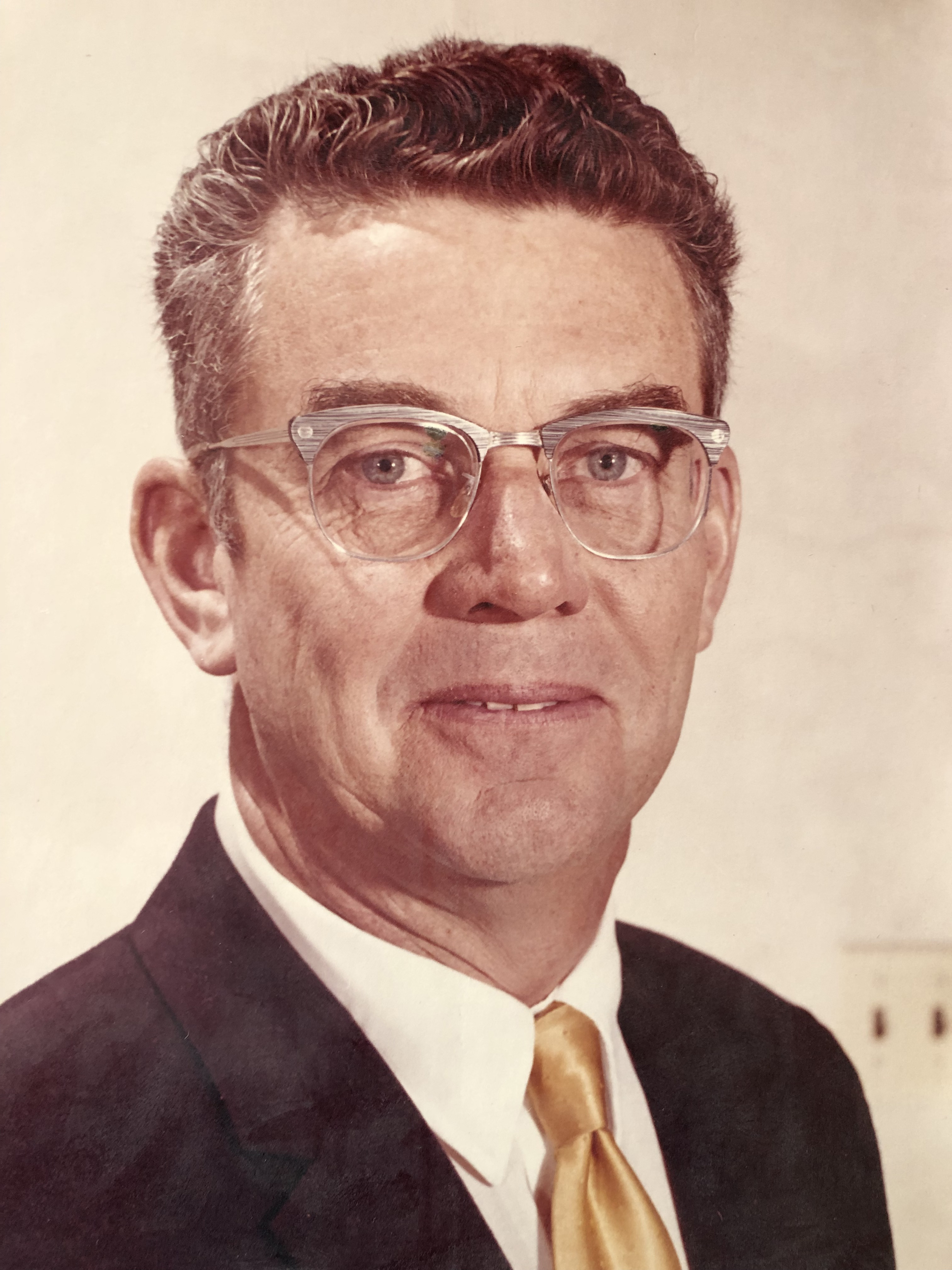
- Read in 1962 (colorized)
- Born: William Thane Read; June 29, 1912; Dermott, Arkansas, U.S.
- Died: October 23, 1996 (aged 84); Prescott, Arizona, U.S.
- Other name: Thane Reed
- Education: Tempe Union High School District; University of Arizona; University of California, Los Angeles
- Organizations: World Constitution Coordinating Committee
- Title: Associate of World Constitution Coordinating Committee
- Spouse: Mabel Gertrude Gill (m. 1938)
- Parents: William Saunders Read (father); Stella C. Cook (mother)
- Relatives: George Read (great-great-great-great-grandfather); George Read II (great-great-great-grandfather); George Read III (great-great-grandfather)

William Thane Read (29 June 1912 – 23 October 1996) was an American advocate for global peace. He was a descendant of George Read, Founding Father of the United States and best known for his leadership in leading the World Constitution Coordinating Committee (WCCC), which built widespread support for the development and establishment of the Constitution for the Federation of Earth by calling the World Constitutional Convention.

== Early life ==
He was born on 29 June 1912 in the town of Dermott, Arkansas, US, to William Saunders Read and Stella C. Cook. From 1926 and 1928, he attended Tempe Union High School, and mostly lived in Tempe, Arizona.

He studied horticulture at University of Arizona and economics at University of California at Los Angeles.

== United World Federalists ==
In 1949, Read joined the United World Federalists (UEF) and, like Albert Einstein, who was a member of the Advisory Board at UEF, spent much of his time advocating the only logical solution to world's problems and world peace: "the establishment of a democratic federal world government".

In 1950, when the Korean War seemed likely to develop into a conflict between the United States and the Soviet Union, he made a rational choice and sailed to the southern part of Brazil with his wife to get out of the range of the Atomic Bomb:

"If my fellow men refuse to try law as a means of preventing war and insist on fighting, I will get out of their way and let them fight."

But with the development of the H-bomb, it become clear to Read that there was no safe place left on Earth, and he came back to United States in 1954 and devoted all his time to advocating the necessity of world law.

"So there is no alternative. There is no place I can go to escape this peril brought on by my fellow men. I must act in self defense!"

== World Constitution Coordinating Committee ==
Thane Read's vision was to build widespread support for the development and implementation of a world constitution, with the aim of addressing the mounting concern over the threat of atomic war and fostering global harmony through a World Federation governed by mutually constituted world law.

In 1958, Thane Read initiated a joint appeal by renowned individuals from around the world, which resulted in the issuance of the "Call to all nations." The Call urged nations to send delegates to Geneva to participate in a world convention tasked with drafting a constitution for a democratic federal World government. This proposed constitution would then be presented to all nations for ratification, ultimately leading to the establishment of a representative parliament for humanity.

With the establishment of the WCCC in 1962, Thane Read became a central figure in promoting the call and garnering support for the World Constitutional Convention. Together with individuals like Janet Frenzel, Lloyd D. Oxley, Evelyn Martin, and Morikatsu Inagaki, they worked tirelessly to engage governments, institutions, and individuals worldwide in discussions about the potential of a World Federation governed by a democratic federal World government.

Thanks to Thane Read's leadership and the dedication of the WCCC, the "Call to all Nations" for the World Constitutional Convention received overwhelming support from influential voices across diverse fields and countries. Prominent signatories included Nobel laureates, eminent leaders, and advocates for global peace and cooperation.

As a result of the Call's adoption, the World Constitutional Convention and the Peoples World Parliament were convened in Interlaken, Switzerland, and Wolfach, Germany, in 1968. These historic gatherings brought together over 200 participants from 27 countries, initiating the drafting process for a world constitution that would form the basis of the Constitution for the Federation of Earth.

Read personally ratified the Constitution for the Federation of Earth at the 4th World Constituent Assembly (WCA),Troia, Portugal, in 1991.

== Political career ==
In mid 1962, he represented a third party named 'American Federal Party' in Arizona.

In late 1974, he also represented a party named 'World Party'.

== Personal life ==
On December 23, 1938, Read married Mabel Gill, daughter of William Gill and Maude Young of Phoenix, Arizona. They had one son, Gill Read (1942).

== Death ==
Thane died on 23 Oct 1996 at the age of 84.

== See also ==
- World constitution
- World government
- Constitution for the Federation of Earth
