= George Reed =

George Reed may refer to:

== Sportsmen ==
- George Reed (footballer) (1904–1958), English midfielder and coach
- George Reed (cricketer) (1906–1988), Welsh right-handed batsman
- George Reed (Canadian football) (1939–2023), American running back in CFL

== Others ==
- George Reed Babcock (1806–1876), American lawyer and legislator from New York
- George B. Reed (1807–1883), American politician and lawyer in Wisconsin
- George McCullagh Reed (1831–1898), Irish-born New Zealand minister and newspaperman
- George W. Reed (1831–1906), American Union Army Medal of Honor recipient
- George H. Reed (1866–1952), African American actor
- George Reed (musician) (1922–2011), American jazz percussionist and singer

== See also ==
- George Read (disambiguation)
- George Reid (disambiguation)
- George Reade (disambiguation)
