= John L. Gardner (brigadier general) =

Brigadier general

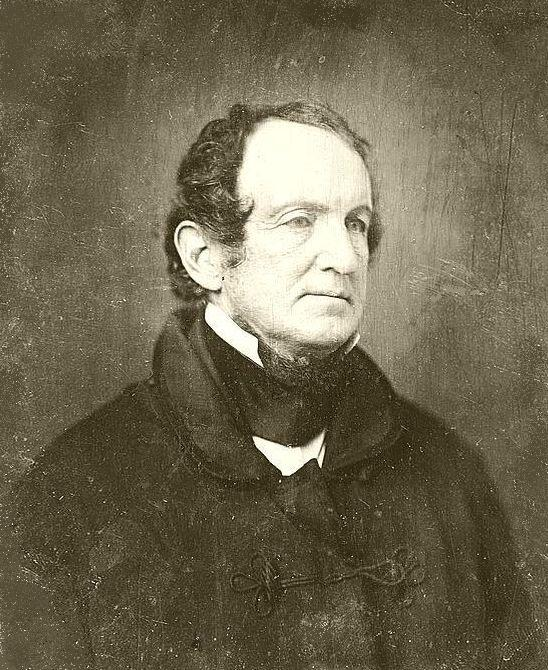
- 1844 photo of Gardner taken by Mathew Brady; Daguerreotype collection (Library of Congress)
- Born: August 1, 1793; Boston, Massachusetts, U.S.
- Died: February 19, 1869 (aged 75); Wilmington, Delaware, U.S.
- Burial place: Immanuel Episcopal Church, New Castle, Delaware
- Military career
- Allegiance: United States of America: Union (American Civil War)
- Branch: United States Army: Union Army
- Service years: 1812–1865
- Rank: Colonel; Brevet Brigadier General
- Units: 4th U.S. Infantry; 7th U.S. Infantry
- Commands: 4th U.S. Artillery
- Conflicts: War of 1812; Battle of Lacolle Mills (WIA); Second Seminole War; Battle of Wahoo Swamp; Mexican–American War; Battle of Cerro Gordo; Battle of Contreras; Third Seminole War; American Civil War

John Lane Gardner (August 1, 1793 – February 19, 1869) was a career officer in the United States Army who reached the rank of colonel and brevet brigadier general. (Note: He was brevetted to brigadier general after he retired from active service.) Gardner served in the War of 1812, the Seminole Wars, the Mexican-American War, and the American Civil War and received multiple commendations for gallantry and competency.

== Early life ==
Gardner was born in Boston, Massachusetts, on August 1, 1793.

== Military service ==
=== War of 1812 ===
During the War of 1812, Gardner received a commission of third lieutenant in the United States Army on May 20, 1813, and was assigned to the 4th U.S. Infantry. His first experience of combat was in Canada where he was wounded in the Battle of La Cole Mills on March 30, 1814, while serving under General James Wilkinson. He served as aide-de-camp to Brigadier General T. A. Smith.

=== Second Seminole War ===
Gardner later fought in the Second Seminole War in Florida (1835-1839), including at the Battle of Wahoo Swamp on November 21, 1836. Shortly after the war, Gardner wrote and published the book Military Control in which he pointed out various faults with existing military organization and management.

=== Mexican–American War ===
During the Mexican–American War, Gardner was a major in the 4th U.S. Artillery and was originally stationed at Fort Polk, Texas between July 29, 1846, and January 31, 1847. He fought at the Battle of Cerro Gordo on April 18, 1847, and received a brevet promotion to lieutenant colonel for gallantry and meritorious conduct. He received another brevet promotion to colonel for his gallantry at the Battle of Contreras on August 20, 1847. At the Battle of Cerro Gordo he commanded a company of the 7th U.S. Infantry, many of whom were killed or wounded during combat. He was later praised by his commanders, including Scott in his report of April 23, 1847, for his signal services.

In January 1848, during the occupation of northern Mexico, Gardner oversaw the shipment of bullion and enforced the collection of taxes on bullion as Superintendent of Assessment for the Federal District.

=== Antebellum Period ===
During the Third Seminole War (1855-1858), Gardner was assigned to garrison duty at Fort Capron, Florida. On June 16, 1858, while serving as commander of Company A, 4th U.S. Artillery, he was transferred to Fort Moultrie, South Carolina for additional garrison duty. In August, a yellow fever epidemic broke out amongst the companies of newly arrived artillerymen, infecting 49 and eventually killing 28. To reduce the possibility of further spreading of the epidemic, Washington authorized Gardner to temporarily move his command outside the fort, and he was absent from throughout most of the summer of 1859 scouting out potential arrangements around Smithville, North Carolina.

As commandant of Fort Moultrie, Gardner took up residence with his family outside of the walls of the fort in a large house directly opposite the Western Postern-Gate. Living in the nearby community, he could not take a very active or visible role giving aid to the fort fearing reprisal to his family and himself. Although he was a Union officer, Gardner still held various southern sympathies and felt that the South had been treated unfairly in the question of territories and had been defrauded by the interests in the North. However, he acquiesced when it came to defending the forts in Charleston Harbor. During the months leading up to the Civil War, Gardner, realizing that secessionist tensions were mounting, made several requests to Secretary of War John B. Floyd for troops to reinforce the garrison at Fort Moultrie, but he received only 70 men, most of whom were southern sympathizers. Floyd, a southern sympathizer, had the intent to weaken the forts at Charleston Harbor so they would fall in the hands of the South Carolinians if there was conflict. Gardner did not receive extra provisions for these men, and he wrote to an old friend, Colonel Joseph P. Taylor, in the Subsistence Department, requesting provisions for one hundred men for six months and hinted that he could carry out the requisition in the normal line of duty without having to inform Floyd.

On November 8, 1860, Colonel Gardner ordered Captain Truman Seymour to transfer arms from the Charleston Arsenal to Fort Moultrie, but the shipment was blocked by civilians. Through an observer, Floyd learned that Gardner had been working his men day and night to strengthen the defenses of Fort Moultrie and had increased its supply of provisions and ammunition. On November 15, 1860, Gardner was relieved of duty and replaced by Major Robert Anderson. Gardner was ordered to report to General David E. Twiggs in Texas.

=== Civil War ===
On July 23, 1861, following the outbreak of the Civil War, Gardner was promoted to colonel and in command of the 2nd U.S. Artillery. He retired from active service on November 1, 1861, after forty-eight years of consecutive service in the Army. After retirement he was involved in recruitment duty for the remainder of the war. He received a brevet promotion to brigadier general for his long and faithful service effective March 13, 1865.

== Final years ==
On August 30, 1866, he began serving on the Board for Retiring Disabled Officers, in Philadelphia.

Gardner died of pneumonia in Wilmington, Delaware, on February 19, 1869, and is interred in at Immanuel Episcopal Church on the Green Cemetery.

== Dates of rank ==
=== United States Army ===
Date	Insignia	Rank	Brevet Promotions
May 20, 1813		Third lieutenant	
March 28, 1814		Second lieutenant	
April 20, 1818		First lieutenant	Bvt. Captain (1820) (Note: From May 18, 1820, while assigned as assistant quartermaster in the Quartermaster's Department until promoted to permanent rank on November 1, 1823.)
November 1, 1823		Captain	Bvt. Major (1833) (Note: November 1, 1833, for ten years faithful service in one grade.)
October 13, 1845		Major	Bvt. Lieutenant colonel (1847) (Note: April 18, 1847, for gallant and meritorious conduct in the Battle of Cerro Gordo.); Bvt. Colonel (1847) (Note: August 20, 1847, for gallantry and meritorious conduct in the Battle of Contreras.)
August 3, 1852		Lieutenant colonel	
July 23, 1861		Colonel	
November 1, 1861	Placed on the retired list with the rank of colonel (died February 19, 1869).		Bvt. Brigadier general (1865) (Note: March 13, 1865, for long and faithful service in the Army.)

== See also ==
- List of American Civil War brevet generals (Union)
- Battle of Fort Sumter
- List of American Civil War battles
- Bibliography of the American Civil War
- List of American Civil War generals (Union)
- List of American Civil War generals (Confederate)

== Bibliography ==
- Bauer, Karl Jack (1992). The Mexican War, 1846–1848.
  University of Nebraska Press 454 pages., Book (par view)
- Cullum, George (2009). Biographical Register of the Officers.
  Applewood Books 676 pages. ISBN 9781429022101., Book (par view)
- Detzer, David (2002). Allegiance: Fort Sumter, Charleston, and the Beginning of the Civil War.
  Houghton Mifflin Harcourt, 400 pages. ISBN 9780156007412., Book (par view)
- Lossing, Benson John (1874). The Pictorial Field Book of the Civil War in the United States of America, Volume 1.
  Hartford, 640 pages: Thomas Belknap., E'book
- Moore, Frank (1889). The Civil War in Song and Story, 1860–1865.
  New York, 560 pages: P. F. Collier., E'book
- Stokely, Jim (1985). Fort Moultrie: Constant Defender.
  Government Printing Office, 81 pages. ISBN 9780912627274., Book (par view)
- Wilson, James Grant; Fiske, John (1888). Appletons' Cyclopaedia of American Biography, Volume 2.
  D. Appleton and Company, New York, 768 pages., E'book

=== Primary sources ===
- Doubleday, Abner (1876). Reminiscences of Forts Sumter and Moultrie in 1860–'61.
  New York: Harper & Brothers, 192 pages., E'book
- Gardner, John Lane (1839). Military Control.
  A. B. Claxton & Company, Washington, D.C., 82 pages., E'book

=== Other sources ===
- Gardner, John Lane; Coates, Annie (2010). "Military control".
  Library of Congress.
- "Moultrie Personages, Commanders, Engineers, etc". Battlefields in Motion, Ltd. 2009. Archived from the original on April 6, 2016.
- "Major Gen. Scott's Official Report-Battle of Cerro Gordo". Virginia Polytechnic Institute and State University. 1847.
- "Chronology of the Fort Sumter Crisis".
  James F. Epperson.
