= George Reid (disambiguation) =

George Reid (1845–1918) was Prime Minister of Australia from 1904–1905.

George Reid may also refer to:

== Art ==
- George Reid (Scottish artist) (1841–1913)
- George Ogilvy Reid (1851–1928), Scottish landscape and portrait artist
- George Agnew Reid (1860–1947), Canadian artist
- George Macdonald Reid (1907–1969), Canadian sculptor

== Military ==
- George Reid (soldier) (1733–1815), American Revolutionary War general
- George Croghan Reid (1876–1961), American Medal of Honor recipient
- George Reid (RAF officer) (1893–1991), World War I flying ace

== Politics ==
- George Alexander Reid (1794–1852), British member of parliament for Windsor
- George Reid (Victorian politician) (1903–1993), Attorney-General of Victoria
- George Reid (Scottish politician) (1939–2025), presiding officer of the Scottish Parliament

== Other ==
- G. Archdall Reid or George Archdall Reid (1860–1929), Scottish physician and writer
- Geordie Reid (George T. Reid, 1882–1960), Scottish footballer
- George Reid (footballer) (1896–?), Northern Irish footballer
- George Reid (born 1989), British electronic musician and member of AlunaGeorge
- George Reid (moderator) (1692–1763), moderator of the General Assembly of the Church of Scotland in 1755
- George T. H. Reid, moderator of the General Assembly of the Church of Scotland in 1973
- George Watson MacGregor Reid, Scottish modern Druid

== See also ==
- George Read (disambiguation)
- George Reade (disambiguation)
- George Reed (disambiguation)
