= New Castle Court House Museum =

Historical building in New Castle, Delaware

- U.S. National Register of Historic Places
- U.S. National Historic Landmark
- U.S. National Historic Landmark District – Contributing property
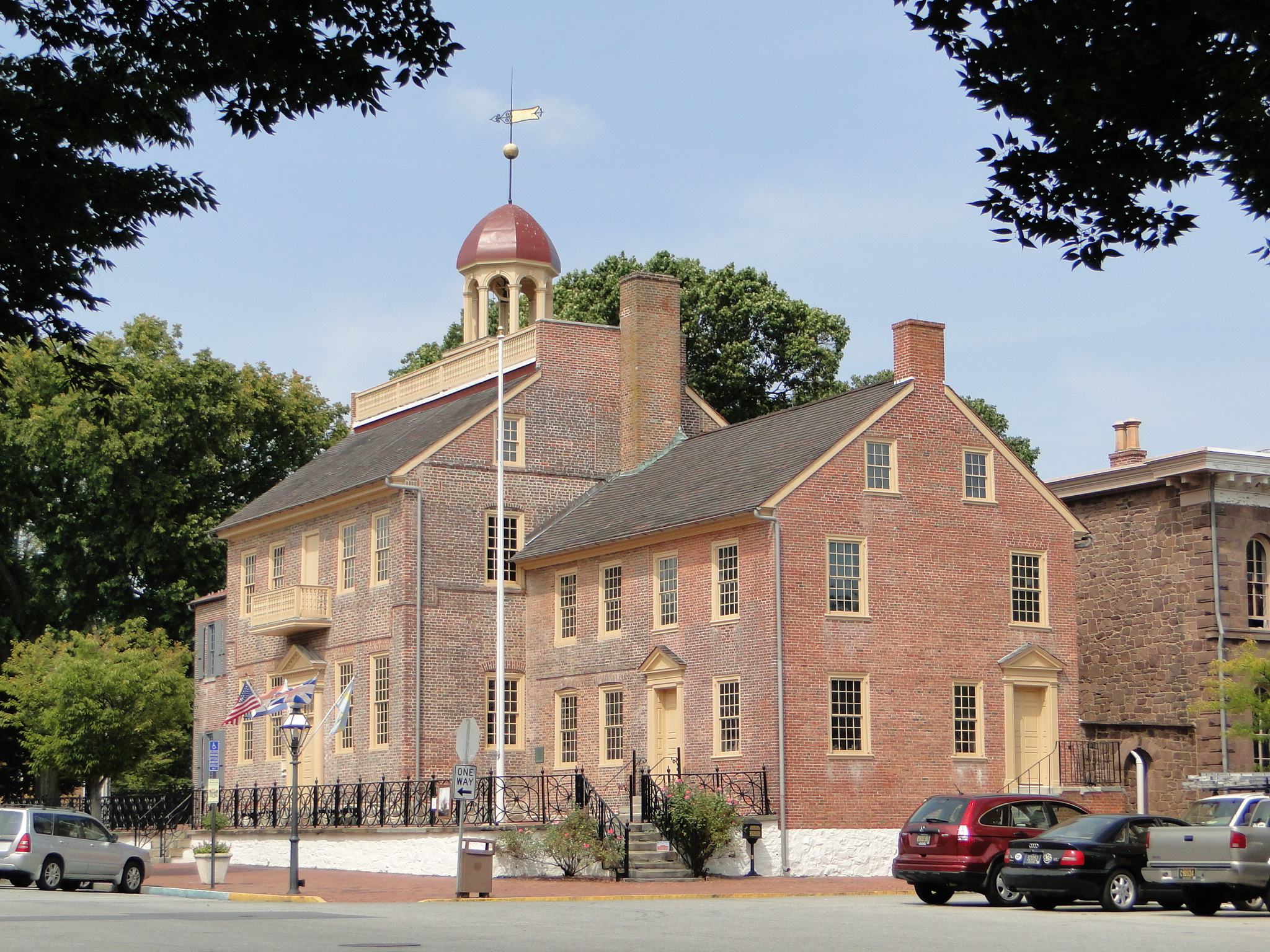
- New Castle Court House Museum

- Location within Delaware Location within the United States
- Location: 211 Delaware St., New Castle, Delaware
- Coordinates: 39°39′35″N 75°33′49″W
- Built: 1730
- Architectural style: Georgian
- Part of: New Castle Historic District (ID67000003)
- NRHP reference No.: 72000285

Significant dates
- Added to NRHP: November 28, 1972
- Designated NHL: November 28, 1972
- Designated NHLDCP: December 24, 1967

The New Castle Court House Museum is the center of a circle with a 12-mile radius that defines most of the border between the states of Delaware and Pennsylvania and parts of the borders between Delaware and New Jersey and Maryland.

It is one of the oldest courthouses in the United States and has played a role in a number of historic events. It was declared a National Historic Landmark in 1972. The building is also a contributing property to a second National Historic Landmark, the New Castle Historic District. It is part of First State National Historical Park.

== History ==
=== The 12-Mile Circle ===
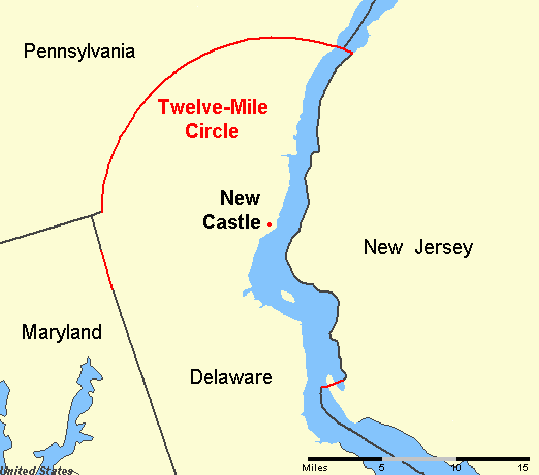
The Twelve-Mile Circle

In 1682, James, the Duke of York gave William Penn a deed for land consisting of a 12-mile circle around the town of New Castle. The borders established by this deed were almost immediately contested by Lord Baltimore, proprietor of the colony of Maryland, and thus began an 87-year legal struggle between the two families. Penn first commissioned a survey of the circle in 1701. As part of the boundary dispute, the two families created a Commission led by Governor Patrick Gordon of Pennsylvania and Governor Samuel Ogle of Maryland, and the Commission met in the New Castle Court House four times in 1732 and 1733. A subsequent Commission, including William Allen and Benjamin Chew met in the Court House in 1750, where it was agreed by both sides that the cupola of the Court House building would be used as the center of the 12-mile circle. The Commission met in the Court House again in 1751 and 1760. The final survey of the borders as part of the boundary dispute was conducted in 1763 by Charles Mason and Jeremiah Dixon, who ran a series of chains on a straight 12-mile line from the Court House. Their Mason–Dixon line has been used as the unofficial dividing line between the north and the south. The Penns and Calverts agreed to the results of the Mason-Dixon survey, and their border dispute was resolved when the British crown ratified the border in 1769. The circle was surveyed again in 1849 by the Army's Corps of Topographical Engineers, and again in 1892 by the United States Coast and Geodetic Survey.

The borders created by the 12-mile circle were also heavily contested by New Jersey beginning in 1820, when New Jersey disputed Delaware's cessation of Pea Patch Island to the United States government since the island was primarily on the New Jersey side of the river. Secretary of War John C. Calhoun requested a legal opinion from Attorney General William Wirt. Wirt's conclusion, based on a report by George Read Jr. and former Attorney General Caesar A. Rodney was that the state of Delaware had the valid claim. After conflicting opinions from two different circuit courts on the issue, President James K. Polk intervened in 1847 and suggested an arbitrator resolve the disagreement. John Sergeant was appointed arbitrator, and in Independence Hall heard arguments from the United States (represented by Senators John M. Clayton and James A. Bayard Jr.) and a citizen of New Jersey (represented by former Secretary of War John Eaton and former Secretary of the Treasury George M. Bibb) regarding the history of colonial deeds and the origin of the Twelve-Mile Circle. Sergeant ruled that the deed for the circle was valid and the island had belonged to the state of Delaware.

New Jersey contested the circle's borders again in 1872, when Delaware arrested several New Jersey fishermen and New Jersey claimed ownership of the Delaware River up to the middle point. The issue has been adjudicated by the United States Supreme Court several times (primarily in 1877, 1934, and 2007) in cases named New Jersey v. Delaware, and the extensive history of the circle and border dispute were documented by Justice Benjamin N. Cardozo in the 1934 case.

=== Colonial and early American history ===
The oldest known courthouse on the site dates back to 1687. The building was originally both a courthouse and a seat of government, as the building was used by the colonial assembly. During the years when Pennsylvania and Delaware shared an assembly, it generally met in Philadelphia, but occasionally met in New Castle instead, such as in 1684 and 1690. In 1700, the Pennsylvania colonial assembly met in the recently constructed Court House, with William Penn in attendance. In addition to the routine passing of laws, Penn's primary focus during the 1700 session was healing a rift that had developed between the assemblymen from Pennsylvania proper and those from Delaware.

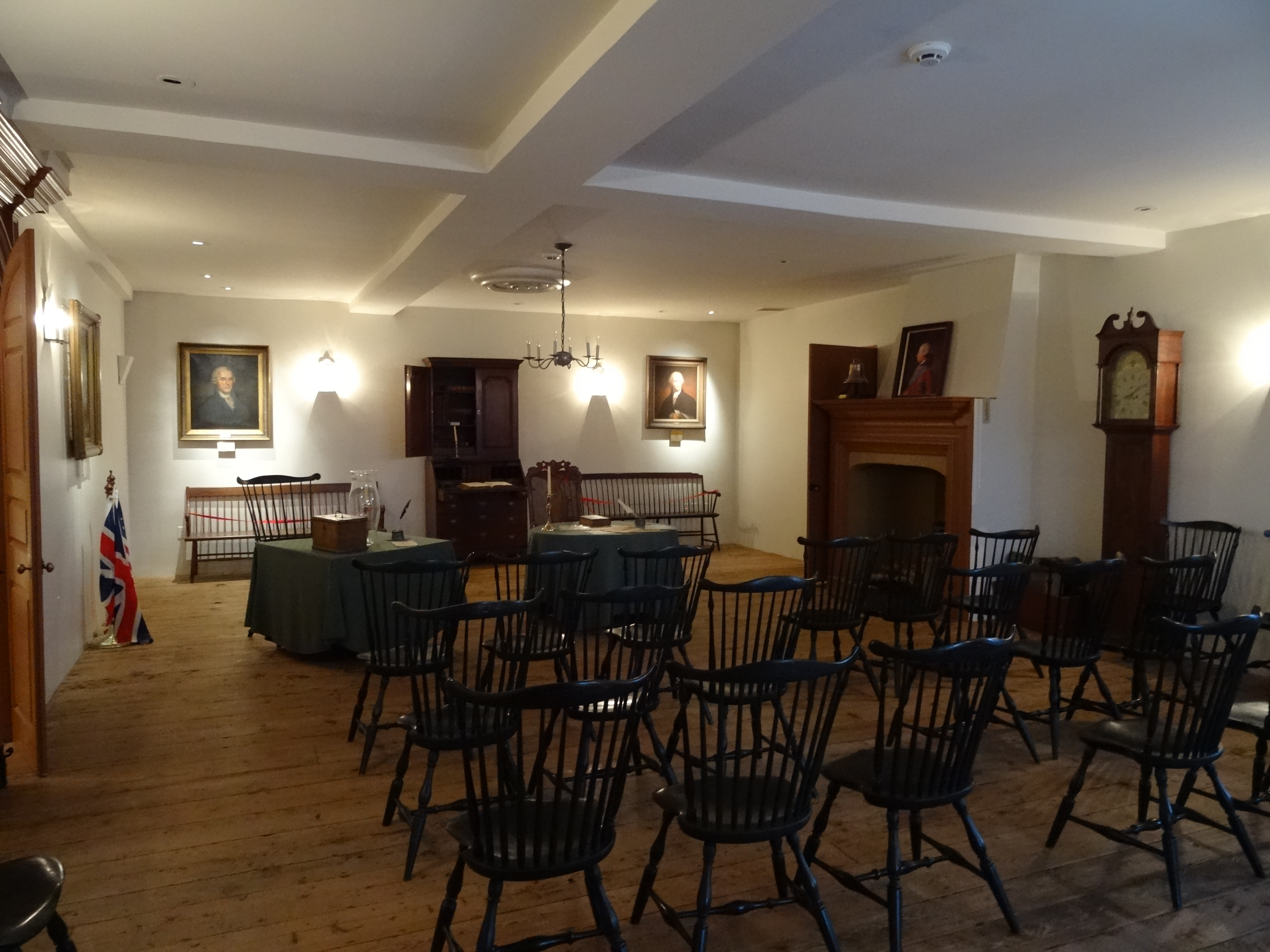
The Court House's Assembly Room

This attempt was unsuccessful. In 1704, after the Pennsylvania counties sought to expand their representation in the assembly, the three Delaware counties demanded, and were granted, an independent assembly so they could pass their own laws. They chose William Rodney, grandfather of Caesar Rodney, as their first Speaker. From that year on, the assembly that met in the Court House governed Delaware alone.

This earlier building was mostly destroyed by a fire in 1729 caused by a prisoner's attempt to escape. The Court House was rebuilt on the same site within a year, and the foundation of the original is still visible.

In 1774, the assembly met here and chose three of Delaware's most famous politicians to represent the colony in the Continental Congress: Thomas McKean, Caesar Rodney, and George Read. It was in this building that the assembly, at McKean's urging, voted on June 13, 1776 to sever all ties with England as well as the state of Pennsylvania, with which Delaware still shared a governor. The assembly resolved that:

Whereas it is become absolutely necessary for the safety, protection, and happiness of the good people of this colony, forthwith to establish some authority adequately to the exigency of their affairs, until a new government can be formed; and Whereas the representatives of the people, in this assembly met, alone can and ought at this time, to establish such temporary [authority]. Resolved unanimously, that all persons holding any office, civil or military, in this colony, on the 13 day of June instant, may and shall continue to execute the same, in the name of the government of the Counties of New Castle, Kent, and Sussex Upon Delaware, as they used legally to exercise it in the name of the King, until a new government shall be formed, agreeable to the resolution of Congress of 15 May instant.

When the Congress issued the Declaration of Independence, it was read to the citizens of the town from the balcony on the second floor. Later in 1776, Delaware's first Constitution was drafted and adopted by a convention including Read, McKean, and Nicholas Van Dyke inside the Court House. This was the first adoption of a state constitution following the issuance of the Declaration. The building served as the state's first capitol until 1777, when Philadelphia and Wilmington were captured by the British. In light of the danger, Delaware's government moved south, establishing Dover as the new capital city. The building continued to house both state and federal judicial proceedings until 1888.

In 1804, when Benjamin H. Latrobe (the designer of the United States Capitol) was living in New Castle, the architect performed a survey and designed a town plan along with his apprentices Robert Mills (later designer of the Washington Monument) and William Strickland (architect of the Second Bank of the United States). The streets around the Court House were regraded so that it would loom above street level as a result of the town plan Latrobe devised. As part of this survey, the architects drew detailed images of the New Castle Court House that were used for later restorations.

=== Impeachment of Samuel Chase ===
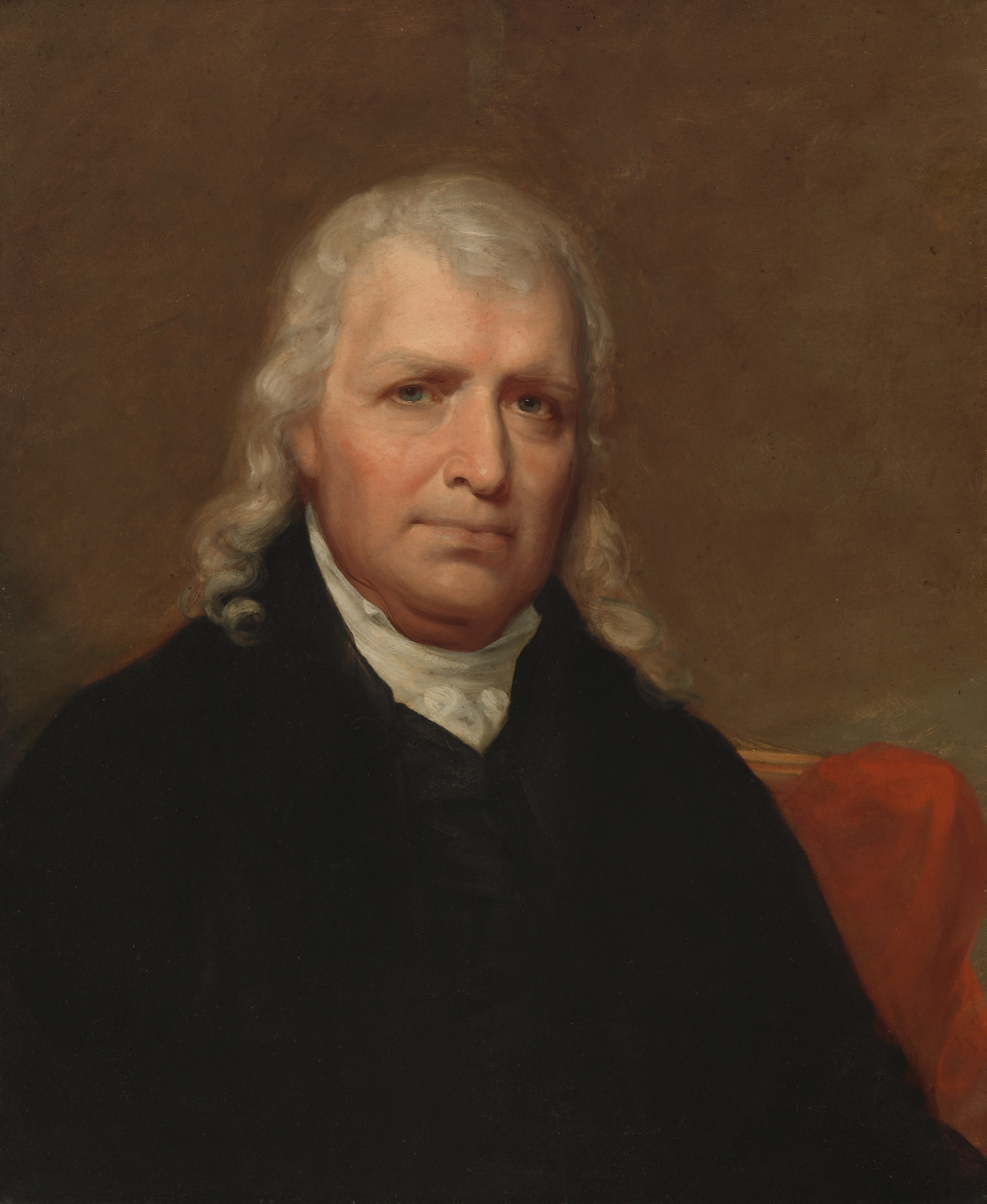
Justice Samuel Chase, who was impeached over his actions in the Court House

In 1800, U.S. Supreme Court Justice Samuel Chase convened a grand jury at the New Castle Court House and sought indictments against seditious newspapers under the Alien and Sedition Acts. The grand jury declined to issue any indictments, but Chase refused to release them from service, insisting he was aware of at least one seditious newspaper and ordering files of the town's newspapers brought in for the jury to review as evidence. The justice was not an impartial party, as the seditious activity he wanted indicted was a local printer's criticisms of Chase himself, over the justice's attacks on free speech rights. Chase was furious at the refusal to indict, complaining "that ... he could not get a single man indicted in Delaware, while he could in every other place."

In 1804, Chase became the first, and only, Justice of the Supreme Court impeached by the House. One of the eight articles of impeachment focused on the justice's conduct in the New Castle Court House. Delaware's U.S. Representative Caesar A. Rodney was one of the House's impeachment managers. The House alleged that Chase had been engaged in a witch hunt to silence Democratic opposition, and that he had abused his authority by refusing to release the grand jury in New Castle. The article of impeachment stated that Chase, "did descend from the dignity of a judge and stoop to the level of an informer by refusing to discharge the grand jury, although entreated by several of the said jury so to do," and quoted his words to the grand jury in saying that he:

... understood "that a highly seditious temper had manifested itself in the State of Delaware among a certain class of people, particularly in Newcastle County, and more especially in the town of Wilmington, where lived a most seditious printer, unrestrained by any principle of virtue, and regardless of social order, that the name of this printer was..." --but checking himself, as if sensible of the indecorum which he was committing, added "that it might be assuming too much to mention the name of this person, but it becomes your duty, gentlemen, to inquire diligently into this matter," or words to that effect[...]

Chase defended himself by stating that if he was aware of a federal law having been broken, it was his duty to bring it to the attention of the court. The Senate found Chase not guilty on each count of impeachment.

Though the attempt to remove Chase was unsuccessful, Rodney fared well, as he was considered the strongest speaker of the managers. The Virginia Law Register stated, "The Managers were entirely overmatched, and with the exception of Rodney, of Delaware, won no praise." He gave one of the closing arguments of the trial, in which he stated, "Give any human being judicial power for life, and annex to the exercise of it the kingly maxim 'that he can do no wrong,' you may call him a judge or justice, no matter what is the appellation, and you transform him into a despot." Two years later, President Thomas Jefferson appointed Rodney U.S. Attorney General.

=== Penn's heirs ===
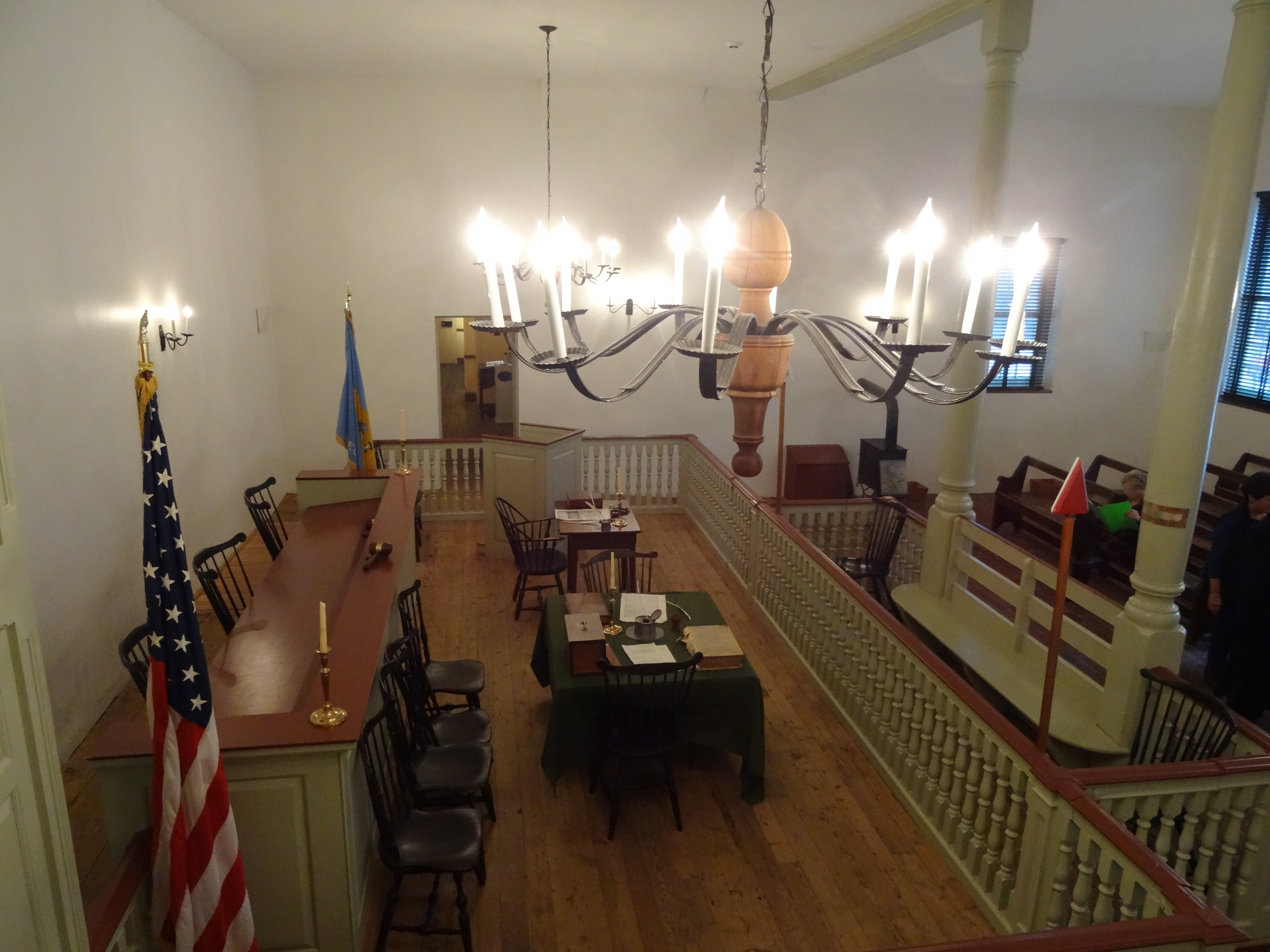
The Courtroom

In 1801, John and Richard Penn, heirs of William, brought a federal lawsuit seeking compensation for the uncultivated lands of Delaware which they claimed they were entitled to as former proprietors. The damages they sought were allowed under the Midnight Judges Act signed into law by President John Adams before the end of his term. The Act was repealed in 1802. In 1804, the case was heard in a trial at the New Castle Court House. The case was notable for the prominence of the legal teams assembled on each side. The Penns were represented by Jared Ingersoll, Joseph McKean (son of Thomas), and Moses Levy; the state of Delaware was represented by Caesar A. Rodney, James A. Bayard Sr., George Read Jr., and state Attorney General Nicholas Van Dyke Jr.

Presiding over the case was U.S. Judge Gunning Bedford Jr. and Justice Samuel Chase. After hearing the legal arguments from each side, Chase determined that the repeal of the 1801 Act left the court without authority to decide the case, and he dismissed it with a memorable opinion:

The question is whether this Court now have a jurisdiction, not whether they have had. The question is very different whether Judicial power extends to a particular case & whether the jurisdiction of a particular Court embraces the case. Congress has certainly power to vary a jurisdiction created by Statute—tho not by Constitution. The question here is whether there is a statutory jurisdiction. This is to be determined by the consideration whether we are to be governed by Statute in force or repealed. The Act of 1801 is repealed without a saving. This is not an ex post facto law—it is retrospective as to rights, I agree, but against no part of the Constitution. I know that in England construction has gone a great way in construction of the words of Statutes. This doctrine I explode. If the words of Statutes are clear, I am bound, tho the provision be unjust. This I hold to be the duty of an American Judge. A Judge has in this Country only to say Sic lex est scripta. Here is a Statute which gave a jurisdiction. It has been repealed. What are we to do. No power remains. The law repealed is dead & is as if it never existed.

The Penns had Lord Gambier bring the claim up to Bayard when the two were negotiating the Treaty of Ghent, but Bayard claimed he had no authority to negotiate the issue, and the Penns made no further legal attempts at the claim.

=== Garrett and Hunn trials ===
One of the building's most famous of judicial proceedings was a series of trials which took place in 1848. Prominent abolitionists and Underground Railroad conductors Thomas Garrett (a close friend and ally of Harriet Tubman) and John Hunn were put on trial for violating the Fugitive Slave Act. The trial was presided over by U.S. Chief Justice Roger Taney. Garrett was defended by his friend U.S. Senator John Wales. The prosecution was handled by James A. Bayard Jr., son of U.S. Senator James A. Bayard Sr. (negotiator of the Treaty of Ghent) and grandson of Richard Bassett (one of the drafters of the U.S. Constitution). The trials mostly served to harden the feelings over slavery of each of the men involved.

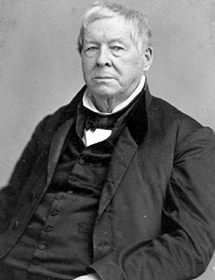
Thomas Garrett

Justice Taney's instructions to the jury left little choice but a conviction:

To entitle the plaintiff to a verdict in this case, it is necessary for him to have proved property of the slaves. This has not been contradicted by the defense. It only remains then to prove that they escaped, and that the defendant harbored them, knowing them to be slaves. It does not require absolute knowledge on the part of the defendant that these persons were slaves. If, at the time, or before he harbored them, circumstances came to his knowledge sufficient to put a prudent man upon his inquiry, it is "knowingly harboring" within the meaning of the act of Congress, and makes him liable to the penalty.

Both Garrett and Hunn were found guilty and were issued fines heavy enough to bankrupt both men. Despite the fines, Garrett and Hunn defiantly declared they would continue helping slaves escape to freedom. Upon hearing Taney's punishment, Garrett gave a speech to the courtroom in which he stated:

I now pledge myself, in the presence of this assembly, to use all lawful and honourable means to lessen the burdens of this oppressed people, and endeavour, according to ability furnished, to burst their chains asunder, and set them free; not relaxing my efforts on their behalf while blessed with health and a slave remains. [...] After mature reflection, I can assure this assembly it is my opinion at this time that the verdicts you have given the prosecutors against John Hunn and myself, within the past few days, will have a tendency to raise a spirit of inquiry throughout the length and breadth of the land, respecting this monster evil (slavery), in many minds that have not heretofore investigated the subject. The reports of those trials will be published by editors from Maine to Texas, and the far West; and what must be the effect produced? It will, no doubt, add hundreds, perhaps thousands, to the present large and rapidly increasing army of Abolitionists. The injury is great to us who are the immediate sufferers by your verdict; but I believe the verdicts you have given against us within the last few days will have a powerful effect in bringing about the abolition of slavery in this country—this land of boasted freedom, where not only the slave is fettered at the South by his lordly master, but the white man at the North is bound as in chains to do the bidding of his Southern masters.

After the trials, Garrett corresponded with Harriet Beecher Stowe, and four years later she used the events as the inspiration for some of the scenes in her novel Uncle Tom's Cabin. Garrett was the primary basis for the character of Simeon Halliday. Stowe also described the trials and recounted her correspondence with Garrett in her book A Key to Uncle Tom's Cabin, where she noted, "The writer had in mind, at the time of writing, the scenes in the trial of [...] Garret, of Wilmington, Delaware, for the crime of hiring a hack to convey a mother and four children from Newcastle jail to Wilmington." By the time the Civil War broke out, Garrett had helped 2,700 slaves escape to freedom. Hunn served with the Freedmen's Bureau, and his son was elected Delaware governor and oversaw state approval of the 13th, 14th, and 15th Amendments to the Constitution.

Taney would go on to author the decision in the famous Dred Scott case in 1857, which held that blacks could not be considered American citizens. Bayard later defeated Wales again in 1850 when he won election to the Senate, where he became one of the fiercest critics of the loyalty oaths and where he voted to acquit President Andrew Johnson in his impeachment trial.

== Museum and National Park ==
The Court House was opened as a museum by the state of Delaware in 1963. The building is now part of First State National Historical Park. The park's headquarters and visitor center will be located in the Sheriff's House adjacent to the Court House. The National Historical Park was created to preserve and interpret the unique history of the region's colonization by the Swedes, Dutch, and English, and Delaware's role in establishing the United States leading up to it becoming the first state.

== See also ==
- National Register of Historic Places listings in northern New Castle County, Delaware
- List of National Historic Landmarks in Delaware
- List of the oldest buildings in Delaware
- Penn–Calvert Boundary Dispute
- The Twelve-Mile Circle
- Read House & Gardens
- Stonum
