= Thomas Read (naval officer) =

United States naval officer

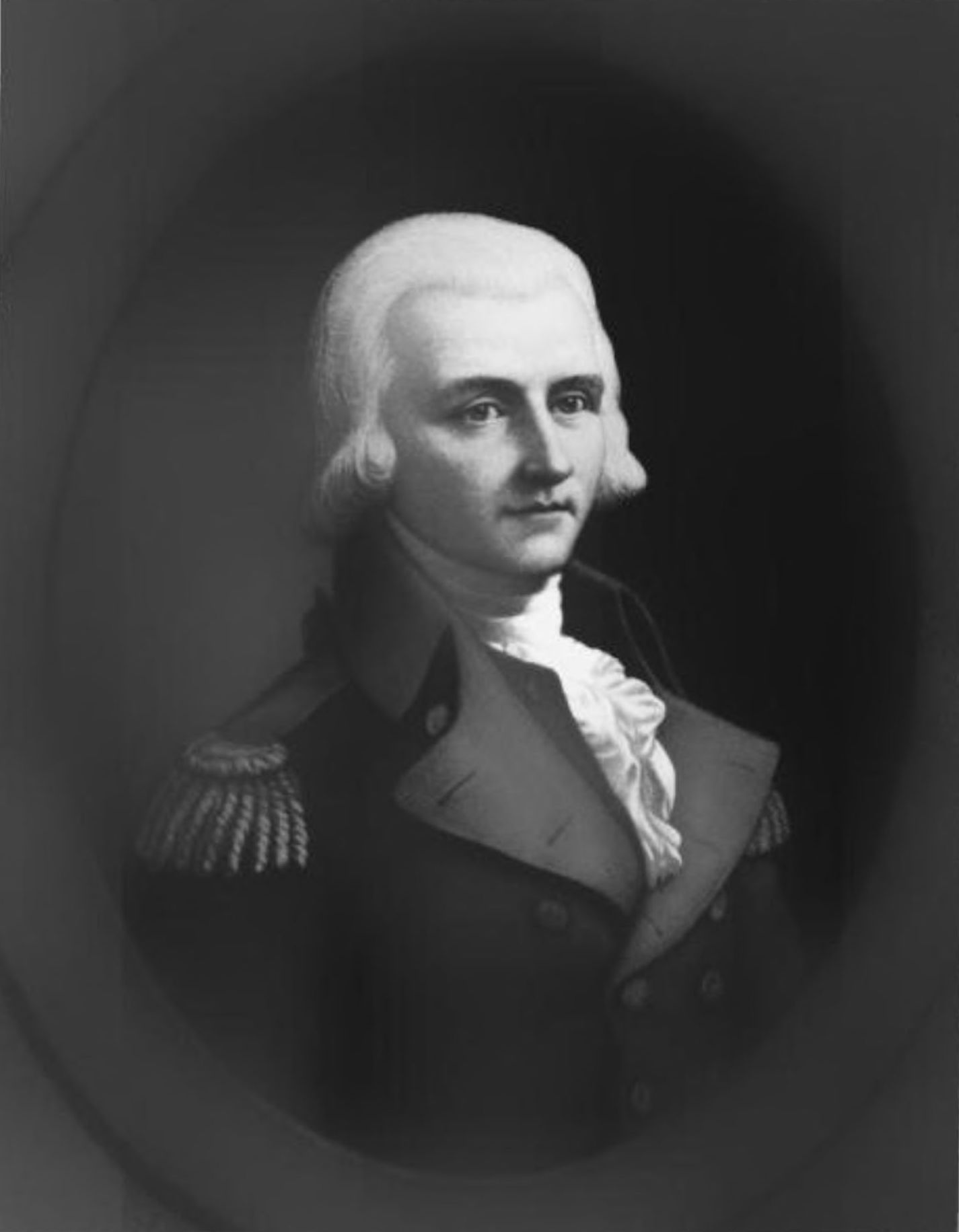
- Born: 1740; New Castle
- Died: 26 October 1788; New Jersey
- Father: John Read
- Relatives: George Read

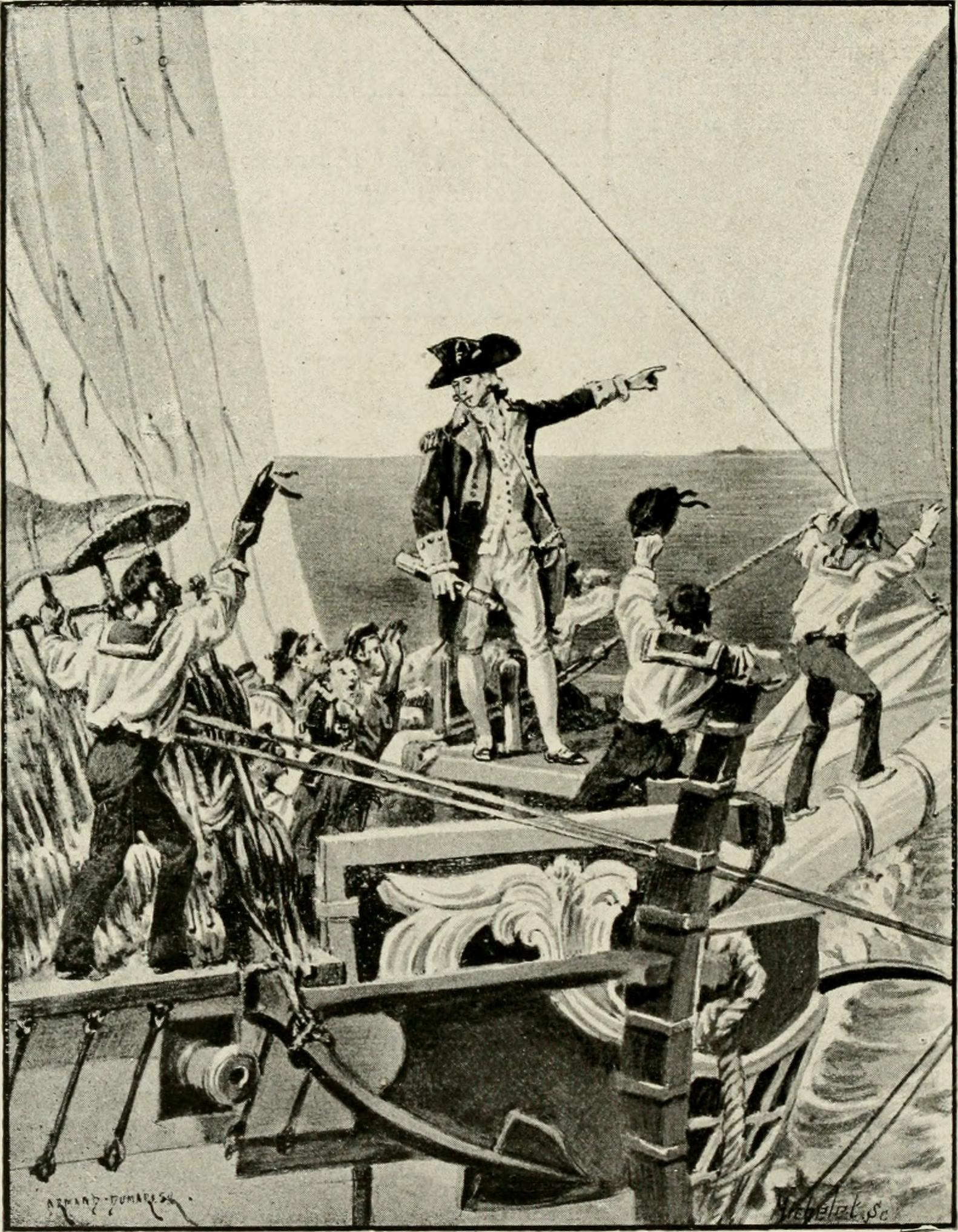
Commodore Thomas Read discovering the Alliance and Morris Islands, 1787.

Thomas Read (1740 in New Castle, Delaware – 26 October 1788 in White Hill, New Jersey) was the first naval officer to obtain the rank of commodore in command of a fleet of the Continental Navy.

== Biography ==
Coat of Arms of Thomas Read

Thomas Read was the son of John and Mary Read, and the younger brother of U.S. statesman George Read. A brother worked in Havana, and Read early took up a life on the ocean, where he was master of vessels in the trans-Atlantic and West Indies trade. He was appointed, on 23 October 1775, commodore of the Pennsylvania Navy, having as the surgeon of his fleet Benjamin Rush, and while holding this command he made a successful defence of the Delaware River. He was appointed, 7 June 1776, to the highest grade in the Continental Navy, and assigned to one of its four largest ships, the 32-gun frigate George Washington, then being built on the Delaware River. While awaiting the completion of his ship he volunteered for land service, and was sent as captain by the committee of safety to join George Washington. He gave valuable assistance in the crossing of the Delaware, and at the Battle of Trenton commanded a battery made up of guns from his frigate, and with it raked the stone bridge across Assunpink Creek.

After much service on sea and land, Thomas Read resigned his commission, and, retiring to his seat near Bordentown, New Jersey, dispensed a liberal hospitality to his old companions-in-arms, especially to his brother members of the Society of the Cincinnati.

Shortly afterward he was induced by his friend, Robert Morris, to take command of his old frigate, the Alliance, which had recently been bought by Morris for commercial purposes, and make a joint adventure to the China seas. Taking with him as chief officer one of his old subordinates, Richard Dale, afterward Commodore Dale, and George Harrison, who became an eminent citizen of Philadelphia, as supercargo, he sailed from the Delaware on 7 June 1787, and arrived at Canton on 22 December following, after sailing on a track that had never before been taken by any other vessel, and making the first "out-of-season" passage to China. In this voyage he discovered two islands, which he named, respectively, "Morris" and "Alliance" islands, and which formed part of the Caroline Islands. By this discovery the United States became entitled to rights which were never properly asserted.
