= Stonum =

Historic house in Delaware, US

- U.S. National Register of Historic Places
- U.S. National Historic Landmark
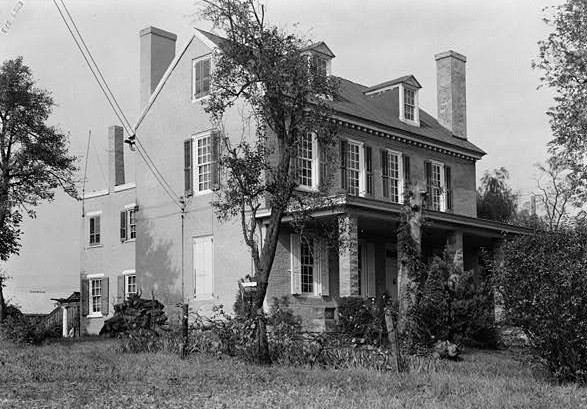
- Stonum, seen in 1938

- Location within Delaware Location within the United States
- Location: 900 Washington Ave., New Castle, Delaware
- Coordinates: 39.66037°N 75.57651°W
- Area: less than one acre
- Built: c. 1750
- Architectural style: Georgian
- NRHP reference No.: 73000524

Significant dates
- Added to NRHP: November 7, 1973
- Designated NHL: November 7, 1993

Stonum, also called Stoneham, is a historic house at 900 Washington Avenue in New Castle, Delaware. Its main section built about 1750, it was the country home of George Read (1733–1798), a signer of the Declaration of Independence. His advocacy enabled Delaware to become the first state ratifying the declaration. The house was declared a National Historic Landmark in 1973. It is the only building standing associated with this Founding Father.

== Description and history ==
Stonum is located west of the downtown area of New Castle, at the northwest corner of Washington Street (Delaware Route 9) and 9th Street. It is set on small wooded lot, facing roughly toward 9th Street. It is a 2 1/2-story brick structure, with a gabled roof and chimneys built into the side walls. A two-story ell extends to the rear, which is probably of older age than the main block. The front facade is four bays wide, with the entrance in the center-right bay, and a single-story porch across the full width, supported by brick posts. The interior has an unusual center hall plan, with the main stairway set immediately to the right of the hall, in what is normally an intra-wall space between the hall and the right-side parlor. The interior has many original finishes, including elegant period fireplace mantels and cornice moulding, and original wooden floors.

The oldest portion of the house, its kitchen ell, was built about 1730. The front portion of the house was added before 1769. A further addition was made in 1850, while a concrete block porch was added in the 1920s. The house once enjoyed an expansive view of the Delaware River, which is now obscured by mature plantings and intervening development.

The house served as a tenant farm for George Read during the 1750s and 1760s; it is unclear if the main block was built during or prior to his period of ownership. It is the only surviving structure associated with Read, a prominent figure in Delaware politics through the Revolutionary period. His rented in-town house is only a few blocks away and burned in 1824, after Read had died and the building was being used as a bank. The location is now the site of the formal gardens attached to the George Read II House, built by his son. Read was an influential figure, contributing significantly to the drafting of Delaware's first state constitution in addition to his service in the Continental Congress (where he signed the United States Declaration of Independence), as President of Delaware, and as a delegate to the Philadelphia Convention which drafted the United States Constitution.

== See also ==
- National Register of Historic Places listings in northern New Castle County, Delaware
- List of National Historic Landmarks in Delaware
- George Read II House, the more elaborate home of his son, now a museum
- New Castle County Court House
