= George Reade =

George Reade may refer to:

- George Reade (British Army officer) (1687–1756), British Army officer and Member of Parliament
- George Reade (colonial governor) (1608–1671), landowner, military officer, judge, politician and acting governor of Virginia Colony

== See also ==
- George Reid (disambiguation)
- George Reed (disambiguation)
- George Read (disambiguation)
