= Read House and Garden =

Historic house museum in Delaware, US

- George Read II House & Gardens
- U.S. National Register of Historic Places
- U.S. National Historic Landmark
- U.S. National Historic Landmark District – Contributing property
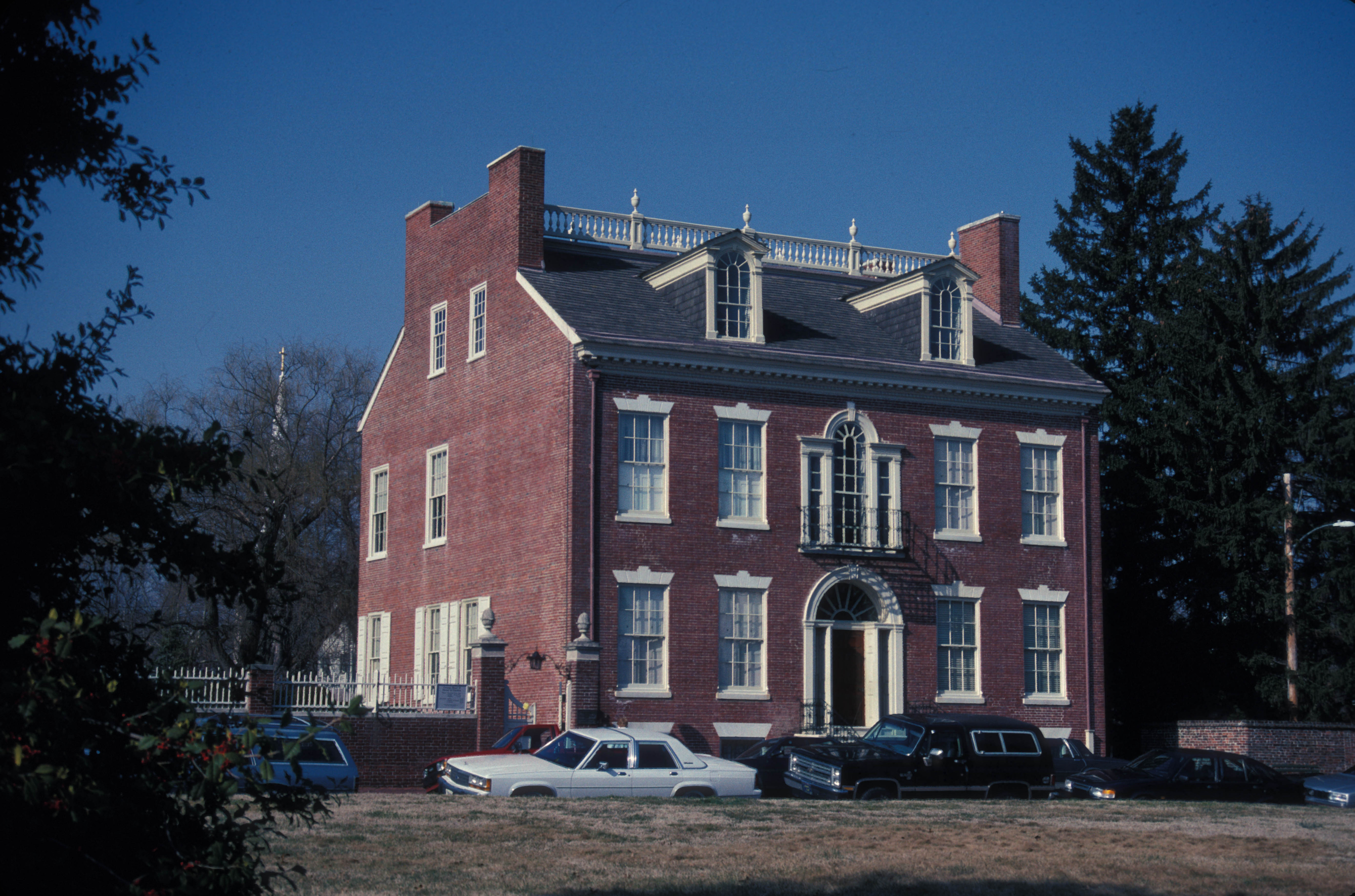
- 1970 photo

- Location within Delaware Location within the United States
- Location: 42 The Strand, New Castle, Delaware
- Coordinates: 39°39′35″N 75°33′41″W
- Area: 2.5 acres (1.0 ha)
- Built: 1793
- Architectural style: Federal
- Part of: New Castle Historic District (ID67000003)
- NRHP reference No.: 100000872

Significant dates
- Added to NRHP: December 23, 2016
- Designated NHL: December 23, 2016
- Designated NHLDCP: December 24, 1967

The Read House & Gardens is a historic house museum at 42 The Strand in New Castle, Delaware, United States. The house, built in 1797–1804 for George Read, Jr., was the largest and most sophisticated residence in the state at the time, and is a significant early example of high-style Federal period architecture. The adjacent formal gardens were laid out in the late 1840s by William Couper, the house's third owner. The property was designated a National Historic Landmark in 2016, and is part of the landmark New Castle Historic District. The house is now owned and operated by the Delaware Historical Society as a museum.

== House ==
The Read House is located in central downtown New Castle, facing the Delaware River across The Strand midway between Harmony and Delaware Streets. The house's view of the river includes a surviving portion of the wharf of George Read. The house is a 2 1/2-story brick building, with a side gable roof and a stone foundation. It has four chimneys, two built into each end wall, with a curtain wall between. The roof's peak is truncated, the flat top section ringed by a low balustrade. The front face of the roof has two dormers, topped by gabled roofs and covering round-arch windows. The main facade is five bays wide, with sash windows set in rectangular openings, with stone sills and splayed stone lintels. The main entrance is at the center, with flanking sidelight windows and pilasters, and a large half-round transom window above. On the second story above the entrance is a Palladian window, its sections flanked by narrow pilasters. To the rear of the main block are two large ells, giving the house a total area in excess of 14,000 square feet (1,300 m^{2}).

The house was built in 1793 for George Read Jr., the son of George Read, one of Delaware's leading statesmen and a signer of the United States Declaration of Independence. The younger Read was a successful lawyer and businessman, whose wealth enabled him to build what was then the largest private residence in the state. Stylistically, it is an important early example of Federal period architecture, taking inspiration from several Adamesque houses built in Philadelphia a few years earlier.

== Garden ==
After Read's death in 1836, the house was rented briefly by John M. Clayton, another Delaware statesman, while he awaited completion of his new home at Buena Vista. The second owner was William Couper, a wealthy businessman who had grown up next door in the former house of George Read I before making a career in the China trade. Houses adjacent to this one, including the George Read I House, were lost to fire in 1824. Couper used the open space created by the fire to establish a formal garden beginning in 1846. The basic layout of the garden appears to follow Couper's basic plan, although the type of plantings is likely not original. Features of its design include brick walkways that wind between the beds, and two gazebos, placed by the Delaware Historical Society at locations of similar structures seen in late 19th-century photographs.

== Subsequent history ==
Couper was a bachelor, who occupied the house along with a number of other family members. After his death, they continued to reside in the house until the last, his niece Hettie Smith, died in 1919. The house was then acquired by Philip and Lydia Laird, who were involved in New Castle's early historic preservation movement, and undertook to maintain the property's historic integrity. Lydia Laird bequested the property to the Delaware Historical Society in 1975. The Society has since undertaken a full restoration of the property, and interprets it primarily in the period of the Read ownership, although some rooms reflect the styles of subsequent owners.

The house is open Wednesday to Sunday year-round, closed only on some holidays; admission is charged.

== See also ==
- Stonum, the George Read I House
- New Castle County Court House
- List of National Historic Landmarks in Delaware
- National Register of Historic Places listings in northern New Castle County, Delaware
