= George Reed (cricketer) =

Welsh cricketer

Personal information
- Full name: George Henry Reed
- Born: 8 August 1906; St Fagans, Cardiff, Wales
- Died: 11 December 1988 (aged 82); Cardiff, Glamorgan, Wales
- Batting: Right-handed
- Bowling: Left-arm fast-medium

Domestic team information
- Years: Team
- 1934–1938: Glamorgan

Career statistics
Competition	First-class
Matches	25
Runs scored	65
Batting average	5.00
100s/50s	–/–
Top score	11
Balls bowled	4,234
Wickets	62
Bowling average	31.30
5 wickets in innings	1
10 wickets in match	–
Best bowling	5/30
Catches/stumpings	6/–
- Source: Cricinfo, 29 September 2011

George Henry Reed (8 August 1906 – 11 December 1988) was a Welsh cricketer. Reed was a right-handed batsman who bowls left-arm fast-medium. He was born at St Fagans, Glamorgan.

Reed made his first-class debut for Glamorgan against Lancashire in the 1934 County Championship. He made 24 further first-class appearances for the county, the last of which came against Sussex in the 1938 County Championship. Seen by some at Glamorgan as a potential long-term replacement for fast bowler Jack Mercer, Reed took 62 wickets at an average of 31.30, with best figures of 5/30. His only five wicket haul came against Sussex in the 1936 County Championship.

He was released by Glamorgan at the end of the 1938 season, and subsequently becoming a police officer. He died at Cardiff, Glamorgan on 11 December 1988.
