= Immanuel Episcopal Church on the Green =

Historic church in Delaware, United States

Immanuel Episcopal Church
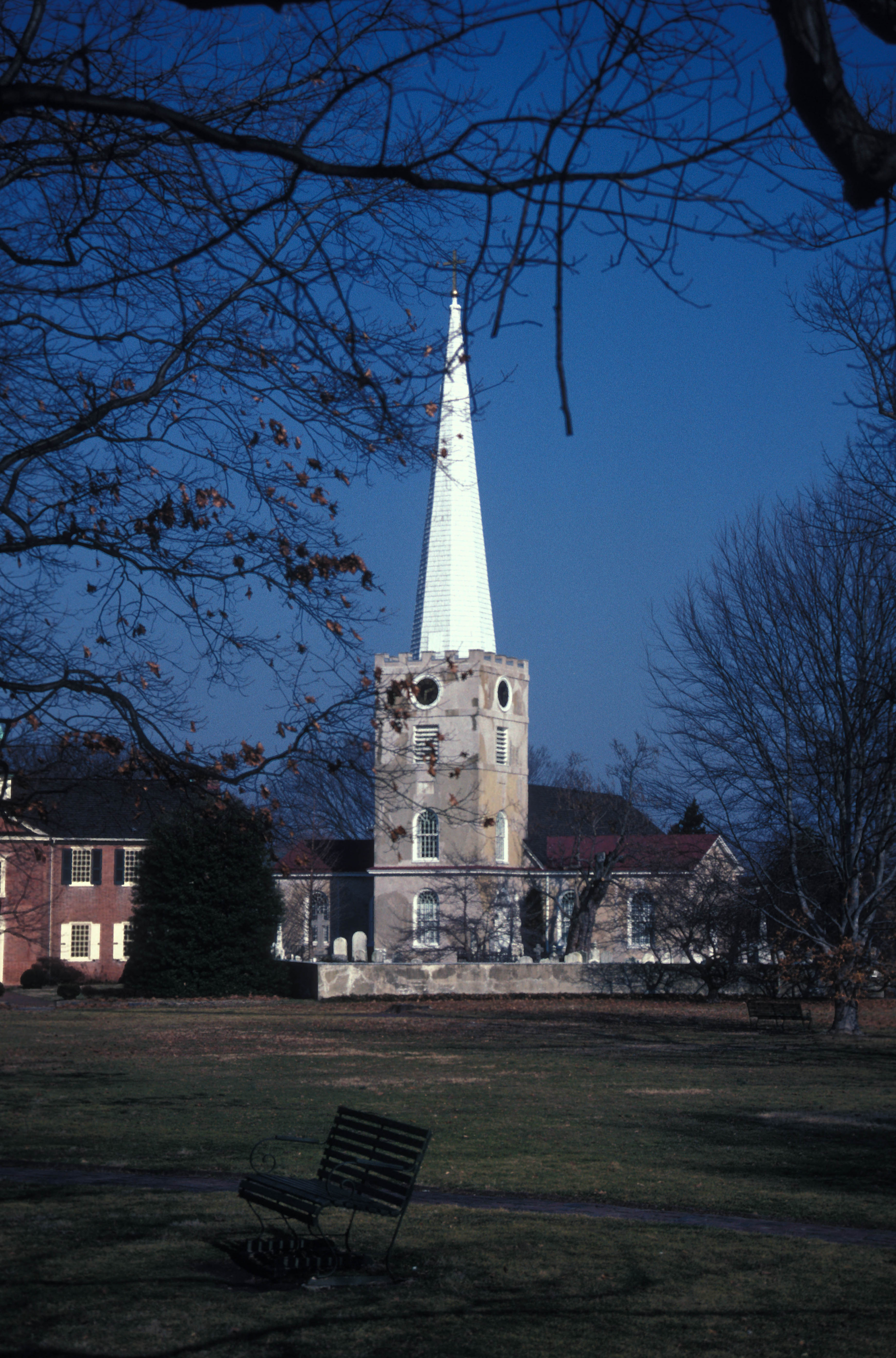
- Immanuel Episcopal Church, 1970
- Immanuel Episcopal Church
- 39°39′38.8″N 75°33′45.5″W
- Location: New Castle, Delaware
- Country: United States
- Denomination: Episcopal Church
- Website: www.immanuelonthegreen.org

History
- Status: Parish church
- Founded: 1689

Architecture
- Functional status: Active
- Groundbreaking: 1703
- Completed: 1708

Administration
- Province: III
- Diocese: Delaware

Clergy
- Rector: The Rev'd Christopher P. Keene
- Immanuel Episcopal Church on the Green
- U.S. Historic district – Contributing property
- Part of: New Castle Historic District (ID67000003)
- Added to NRHP: December 24, 1967

Immanuel on the Green (Episcopal) is an historic church in New Castle, Delaware, listed as a contributing property in the New Castle Historic District. The church is situated near the center of New Castle at the northeast end of the Green, or town common, making it a prominent local landmark and tourist attraction. Operating continuously since 1689, it is the oldest Anglican parish in Delaware and the oldest continuously operating Anglican/Episcopal parish in the country. The church building was constructed between 1703 and 1708 and enlarged in 1822. The interior and roof were rebuilt following a disastrous fire in 1980.

The church is a congregation of the Episcopal Diocese of Delaware. In 2015, the church reported 207 members; in 2023, it reported 190 members. No membership statistics were reported in 2024 national parochial reports. Plate and pledge financial support reported by the church in 2024 was $197,543. Average Sunday Attendance (ASA) reported in 2024 was 84 persons. This was a relative decrease from ASA of 120 reported in 2016.

== History ==
Immanuel Church was founded in 1689 as the first Anglican parish in the present-day state of Delaware, which at the time was still part of Pennsylvania. The first rector was the Rev. George Ross, who served from 1705 to 1708 and then from 1714 to 1754. The church itself was constructed between 1703 and 1708, with the first services taking place there even before the building was completed.

The church gradually fell into disrepair after the American Revolution. In 1820, Philadelphia architect William Strickland undertook a major renovation and expansion of the building which included a new transept, bell tower, steeple, roof, and interior. The interior was remodeled in the 1850s in the Victorian style, and again around 1900 in the Colonial Revival style.

Immanuel Church caught fire on February 1, 1980 when embers from a nearby marsh fire landed on the roof. The roof, steeple, and interior of the building were completely destroyed, leaving only the exterior walls intact. Despite the severe damage, an outpouring of support from around the state that netted more than $2 million made it possible to rebuild the church. Restored to its 1822 appearance, the church was rededicated on December 18, 1982.

== Architecture ==
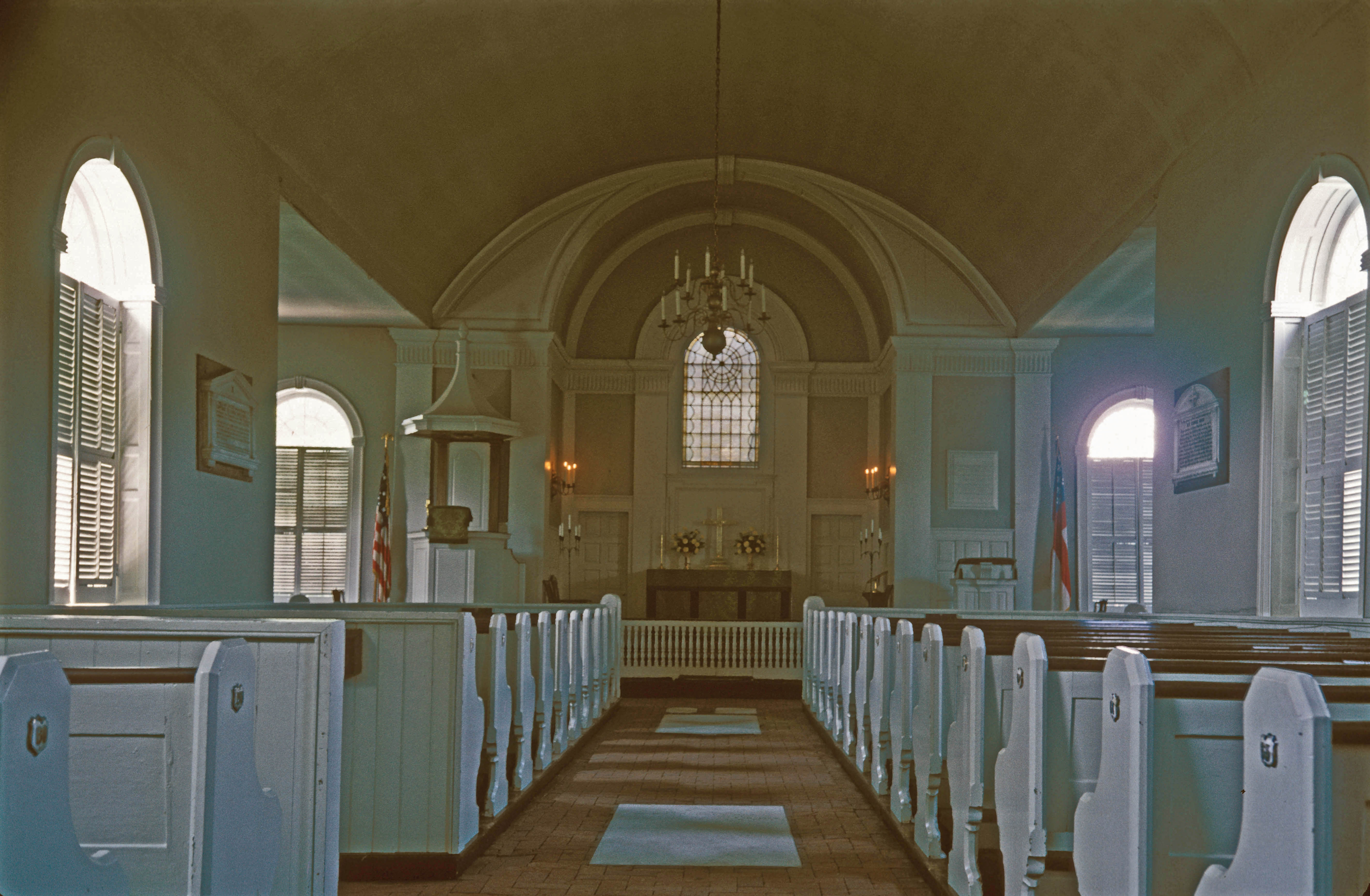
Church interior

The National Register of Historic Places listing for the New Castle Historic District describes Immanuel Episcopal Church as a "stuccoed stone, 5 bay, center aisle church with clipped gable roof, and stone and frame spire with clock". The current appearance of the building is mostly due to architect William Strickland, who was responsible for the transept and crenellated tower. The reconstructed roof, steeple, and interior also follow Strickland's design.

== Cemetery ==
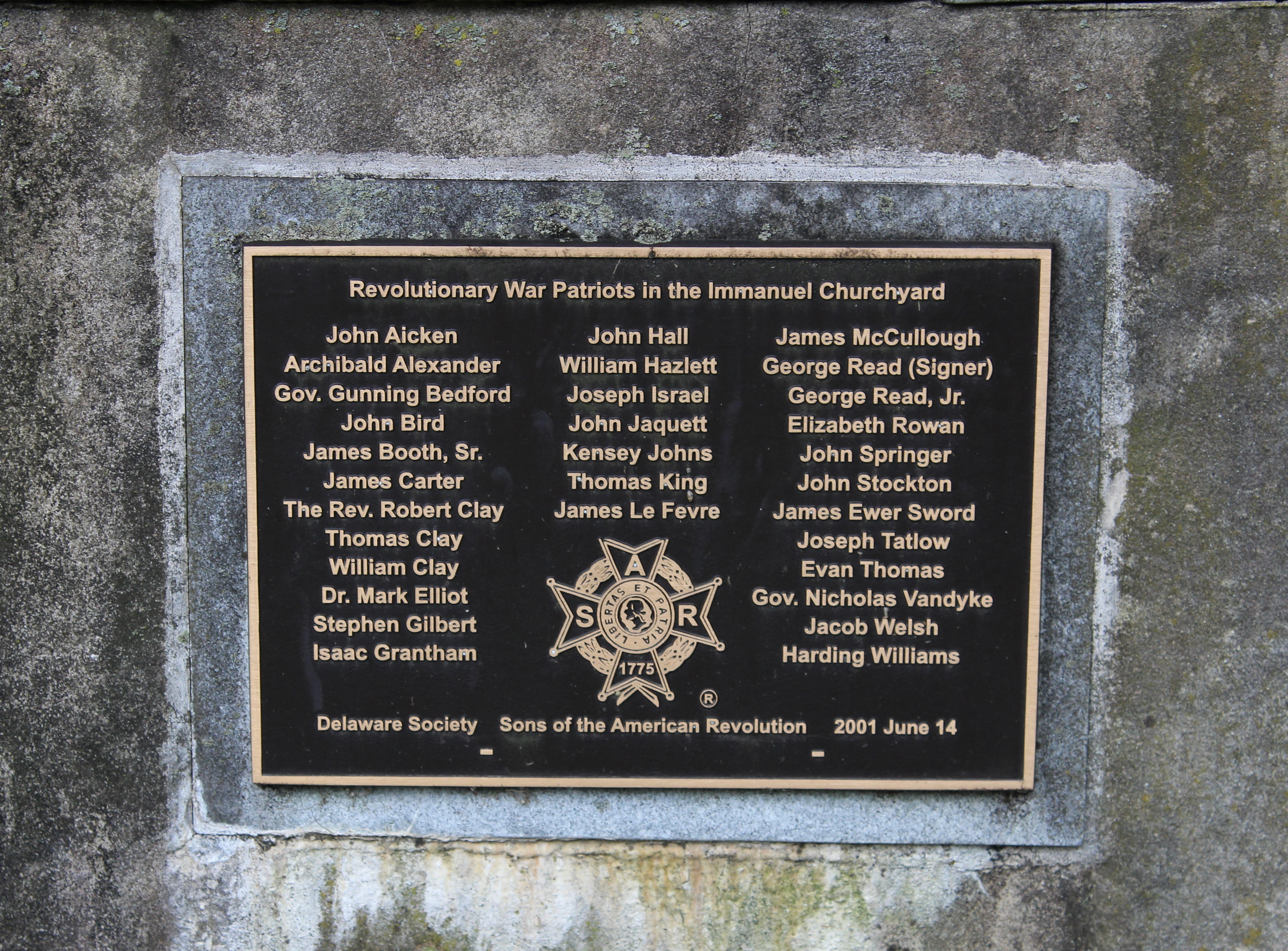
Plaque commemorating the American Revolutionary War Patriots buried in Immanuel Episcopal Churchyard

Several notable people are interred in the Immanuel Church cemetery:

- Gunning Bedford Sr., Governor of Delaware
- C. Douglass Buck, U.S. Senator
- John L. Gardner, Brigadier General
- George Read, signer of the Declaration of Independence
- George Read Jr., first U.S. Attorney for Delaware
- George B. Rodney, U.S. Representative
- Thomas Stockton, Governor of Delaware
- Nicholas Van Dyke Sr., Governor of Delaware
- Nicholas Van Dyke Jr., U.S. Senator
- Mary Borden McKean, wife of Thomas McKean, 2nd Governor of Pennsylvania
