= Rodney family of Delaware =

Prominent family from Delaware

The Rodney family of Delaware was a prominent family of farmers and politicians in Kent County and Sussex County, Delaware. It includes a signer of the Declaration of Independence, a member of the Continental Congress, three governors of Delaware, a U.S. senator, and two U.S. representatives.

William Rodney (or Rodeney) came to Philadelphia soon after William Penn and having settled at St. Jones Hundred, near what later became Dover, Delaware, was foreman of a Kent County jury in December 1681. The eldest of six children, he was baptized in Bristol, England, on December 14, 1660. His father worked as a royal prosecutor and surveyor of customs in New York, dying on Long Island Sound in 1679, while returning from the West Indies.

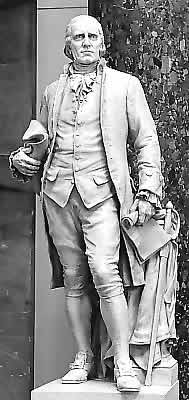
Caesar Rodney U.S. Capitol Statutory Hall

Rodney coat of arms

- William Rodney m. 1) Mary Hollyman
  - William Rodney, m. Ruth Curtis
    - John Rodney, m. Ruth Hunn
      - John
      - Thomas
      - Daniel Rodney (1764–1846), Governor of Delaware, m. Sarah Fisher (daughter of Henry Fisher)
        - Hannah (1794–1828), m. Dr. John White
        - George B. Rodney (1803–1883), U.S. Representative from Delaware
          - George B. Rodney Jr. (1842–1927)
        - John
        - William
        - Henry Fisher (1800–1869), m. Mary Burton
        - Nicholas
        - Susan
        - Mary
      - Caleb Rodney (1767–1840), Governor of Delaware, m. Elizabeth West (1771–1812)
        - Hannah (1807–1889), m. Laban L. Lyons
        - Hester, m. Dr. Henry Fisher Hall
        - Penelope, m. Caleb S. Layton
        - Eliza, m. Landreth
        - Daniel
- William Rodney m. 2) Sarah Jones
  - Caesar Rodney (1707–1745) m. Elizabeth Crawford (daughter of the Rev. Thomas Crawford)
    - Caesar Rodney (1728–1784), signer of the Declaration of Independence, Continental Congressman, and President of Delaware
    - Thomas Rodney (1744–1811), U.S. Representative from Delaware, m. Elizabeth Fisher
      - Caesar Augustus Rodney (1772–1824), U.S. Senator from Delaware, m. Susan Hunn (daughter of Capt. John Hunn)
      - Lavinia
    - William Rodney, m. ?
      - Letitia
