= G. Archdall Reid =

Sir George Archdall O'Brien Reid KBE FRSE (7 April 1860 – 19 November 1929) was a Scottish physician, and a writer on public health and on the subject of evolution. He was interested in the effects of alcohol on society, and in the evolution of races. He was one of the first to identify alcoholism as a disease.

== Life ==
George Archdall Reid was born in Roorkee in India, on 7 April 1860, the only son of Captain Charles Auguste Reid of the 20th Bengal Native Infantry attached to the Honourable East India Company of Scotland (HEICS).

He was educated privately then studied medicine at the University of Edinburgh graduating with an MB ChB in 1887. He then worked variously as a schoolmaster, Kauri gumdigger, stockman and hunter. In 1900 he was elected a Fellow of the Royal Society of Edinburgh. His proposers were Sir William Turner, Andrew Wilson, James Cossar Ewart and Alexander Crum Brown.

In 1919 he was created a Knight Commander of the British Empire (KBE) by King George V.

He died of angina pectoris at 20 Lennox Road South in Southsea on 19 November 1929.

== Family ==
In 1891 he married Florence Mahony (d.1926). Following her death he married the widow of Dr R.E. Wilmot.

== Writings on evolution and heredity ==
His writings on evolution and heredity are of interest as examples of thinking in this field at a time when the new science of genetics was in turmoil, following the rediscovery of the work of Gregor Mendel which appeared to conflict with Darwin's theory of evolution by natural selection. This was the start of a period in which the Modern evolutionary synthesis came into being.

== Reception ==
Alfred Russel Wallace, co-founder of the theory of evolution by natural selection, with Darwin, wrote of Reid:

It is refreshing to turn to Mr. Archdall Reid's volume which, though unnecessarily diffuse, is full of original ideas and acute reasoning. The larger part of it is devoted to a discussion of the general subject of organic evolution. This is exceedingly well done, and it contains a very forcible argument against the possibility of the inheritance of acquired characters in the higher animals, derived from the facts of cell-division and specialisation in the development of the individual. This argument has not, within my knowledge, been so clearly and forcibly set forth by any other writer. There are also some very acute criticisms of the writings of Herbert Spencer and others on evolution, and great stress is laid on a rather neglected subject, the development of acquired characters during the growth of the individual, though on this point the author's views seem rather exaggerated and open to criticism.

and:

I was greatly pleased with Archdall Reid's view of Mendelism in Nature. He is a very clear and original thinker.

== Works ==
- Reid, G. Archdall (1896). The Present Evolution of Man. London: Chapman & Hall. OCLC 2899321.
- —— (1901). Alcoholism. A study in heredity. London: T. Fisher Unwin. OCLC 776318813. (also New York : William Wood, 1902)
- The Principles of Heredity (1905)
- The Laws of Heredity (1910), Methuen and Co. Ltd London
- The Mnemic Theory of Heredity (1912)
- The Prevention of Venereal Disease (1920)
