= George Read (American politician, born 1733) =

American Founding Father and politician (1733–1798)

Chief Justice of Delaware
- In office September 30, 1793 – September 21, 1798
- Preceded by: William Killen
- Succeeded by: Kensey Johns

United States Senator from Delaware
- In office March 4, 1789 – September 18, 1793
- Preceded by: Office established
- Succeeded by: Henry Latimer

3rd President of Delaware
- In office October 20, 1777 – March 31, 1778
- Preceded by: Thomas McKean
- Succeeded by: Caesar Rodney

Continental Congressman from Delaware
- In office August 2, 1774 – December 17, 1777
- Preceded by: new office
- Succeeded by: Caesar Rodney

Personal details
- Born: September 18, 1733 Cecil County, Province of Maryland, British America
- Died: September 21, 1798 (aged 65) New Castle, Delaware, U.S.
- Resting place: Immanuel Episcopal Churchyard, New Castle
- Party: Federalist
- Spouse: Gertrude Ross Till
- Children: 4, including George Jr.
- Relatives: George Read III (grandchild); Thane Read (great-great-great-great-grandchild)
- Profession: lawyer

George Read (September 18, 1733 – September 21, 1798) was an American politician from New Castle in New Castle County, Delaware. He was a Continental Congressman from Delaware, a delegate to the U.S. Constitutional Convention of 1787, president of Delaware, and a member of the Federalist Party. In addition, Read served as U.S. Senator from Delaware and chief justice of Delaware.

Read was a Founding Father of the United States, one of only two statesmen who signed four of the great state papers on which the country's founding is based: Petition to the King and Continental Association, both passed by the Congress of 1774, as well as the Declaration of Independence in 1776 and Constitution of the United States in 1787.

== Father ==
Coat of Arms of George Read

Read was the son of John and Mary (Howell) Read. John Read was born in Dublin, Ireland, the son of an Englishman of large fortune belonging to the family of Read of Berkshire, Hertfordshire, and Oxfordshire. The death of his beloved having left him bereft, John Read came to the American colonies and, with a view of diverting his mind, entered into extensive enterprises in Maryland and Delaware.

Soon after his arrival in America, John Read purchased a large estate in Cecil County, Maryland, and founded with six associates the city of Charlestown on the headwaters of Chesapeake Bay, with the intention of creating a new market for the northern trade. They developed northern Maryland and built up the neighboring iron works of the Principio Company, in which the older generations of the Washington family, and at a later period General George Washington, were also largely interested.

As an original proprietor of Charlestown, John Read was appointed by the colonial legislature of Maryland one of the commissioners to lay it out and govern it. He held various military offices during his life, and in his later years resided on his plantation in New Castle County.

== Early life ==
George Read was born at Cecil County, Maryland, on September 18, 1733. When he was an infant, the family moved to New Castle County, Delaware, settling near the village of Christiana. As he grew up, Read joined Thomas McKean at the Rev. Francis Allison's Academy at New London, Pennsylvania, and then studied law in Philadelphia with John Moland. He was admitted to the Pennsylvania Bar in 1753, and a year later he returned home to establish a practice at New Castle.

In 1763 he married Gertrude Ross Till, daughter of the Rev. George Ross, the Anglican rector of Immanuel Church in New Castle and widowed sister of George Ross, also a future signer of the Declaration of Independence. They had four children, John, George Jr., William, and Mary, who married Matthew Pearce (she is often confused with her paternal aunt, Mary Read, who in 1769 married Gunning Bedford, Sr., a future Governor of Delaware). They lived on The Strand in New Castle, and their house was in what is now the garden of the present Read House and Gardens, owned by the Delaware Historical Society. They were members of Immanuel Episcopal Church.

In 1763 John Penn, the proprietary governor, appointed Read crown attorney general for the three Delaware counties, and he served in that position until leaving for the Continental Congress in 1774. He also served in the Colonial Assembly of the lower Delaware counties for twelve sessions, from 1764/65 through 1775/76.

== American Revolution ==
Declaration of Independence, by John Trumbull (1818) portrays the presentation of the Declaration of Independence to Congress.

Eighteenth-century Delaware was politically divided into loose factions known as the "Court Party" and the "Country Party." The majority Court Party was generally Anglican, strongest in Kent and Sussex Counties, worked well with the colonial proprietary government and was in favor of reconciliation with the British government. The minority Country Party was largely Ulster-Scot, centered in New Castle County, and quickly advocated independence from the British. Read was often the leader of the Court party faction, and as such he generally worked in opposition to Caesar Rodney and his friend and neighbor Thomas McKean.

Read, like most other people in Delaware, was in favor of trying to reconcile differences with Great Britain. He opposed the Stamp Act and similar measures of Parliament but supported anti-importation measures and dignified protests. He was quite reluctant to pursue the option of outright independence. Nevertheless, from 1764 he led the Delaware Committee of Correspondence and was elected to serve along with the more radical McKean and Rodney in the First and Second Continental Congress from 1774 to 1777. He was frequently absent, and when the Congress voted on American Independence on July 2, 1776, Read surprised many by voting against it. That meant that Rodney had to ride overnight to Philadelphia to break the deadlock in Delaware's delegation for independence. However, when the Declaration of Independence was finally adopted, Read signed it despite his caution.

== Government of Delaware ==
Anticipating the Declaration of Independence, the General Assembly of the lower counties declared its separation from the British government on June 15, 1776, in the New Castle Court House. Once the Declaration of Independence was actually adopted, the General Assembly called for elections to a Delaware constitutional convention to draft a constitution for the new state. Read was elected to this convention, became its president, and guided the passage of the McKean-drafted document, which became the Delaware Constitution of 1776.

Read was elected to the first Legislative Council of the Delaware General Assembly and was selected as the speaker in both the 1776/77 and 1777/78 sessions. At the time of the capture of President John McKinly, Read was in Philadelphia attending Congress; after narrowly escaping capture himself while he was returning home, he became president on October 20, 1777, serving until March 31, 1778. The British occupied Philadelphia and were in control of the Delaware River. Read tried, mostly in vain, to recruit additional soldiers and to protect the state from raiders from Philadelphia and off ships in the Delaware River. The Delaware General Assembly session of 1777/78 had to be moved to Dover, Delaware, for safety, and the Sussex County General Assembly delegation was never seated because disruptions at the polls had negated the election results.

After Rodney was elected to replace him as president, Read continued to serve in the Legislative Council until the 1778–79 session. After a one-year rest nursing ill health, he was elected to the House of Assembly for the 1780/81 and 1781/82 sessions. He returned to the Legislative Council in the 1782/83 session and served two terms until the 1787/88 session. On December 5, 1782, he was elected judge of the Court of Appeals in Cases of Capture.

Delaware General Assembly (sessions while President)
Year	Assembly	Senate Majority	Speaker	House Majority	Speaker
1777/78	2nd	non-partisan	George Read	non-partisan	Samuel West

== Federalist ==
Read was again called to national service in 1786 when he represented Delaware at the Annapolis Convention. Because so few states were represented, this meeting produced only a report calling for a broader convention to be held in Philadelphia the next year. At what became the Constitutional Convention, Read again represented Delaware. Quoting from Wright & Morris in their Soldier-Statesmen of the Constitution,

Read immediately argued for a new national government under a new Constitution, saying 'to amend the Articles was simply putting old cloth on a new garment.' He was a leader in the fight for a strong central government, advocating, at one time, the abolition of the states altogether and the consolidation of the country under one powerful national government. 'Let no one fear the states, the people are with us;' he declared to a Convention shocked by this radical proposal. With no one to support his motion, he settled for protecting the rights of the small states against the infringements of their larger, more populous neighbors who, he feared, would 'probably combine to swallow up the smaller ones by addition, division or impoverishment.' He warned that Delaware 'would become at once a cipher in the union' if the principle of equal representation embodied in the New Jersey (small-state) Plan was not adopted and if the method of amendment in the Articles was not retained. He favored giving Congress the power to veto state laws, making the federal legislature immune to popular whims by having senators hold office for nine years or during good behavior, and granting the U.S. President broad appointive powers. Outspoken, he threatened to lead the Delaware delegation out of the Convention if the rights of the small states were not specifically guaranteed in the new Constitution.

Once the rights were assured, he led the ratification movement in Delaware, which, partly as a result of his efforts, became the first state to ratify and did so unanimously.

== Senator ==
Following the adoption of the U.S. Constitution, the Delaware General Assembly elected Read as one of its two U.S. Senators. His term began on March 4, 1789, and he was reelected in 1791 but resigned on September 18, 1793. Read served with the Pro-Administration Party majority in the First and Second Congress, under President Washington. He supported the assumption of state debts, establishment of a national bank, and the imposition of excise taxes. He resigned to accept an appointment as Chief Justice of the Delaware Court of Errors and Appeals - a predecessor of the Delaware Supreme Court - and served in that capacity until his death.

Read's resignation from the Senate was before the first session of the Third Congress assembled, but it was not until February 7, 1795, four weeks before it adjourned, that Henry Latimer was elected to replace him. One of Delaware's Senate seats was, therefore, vacant from September 18, 1793, until February 7, 1795.

== Death and legacy ==
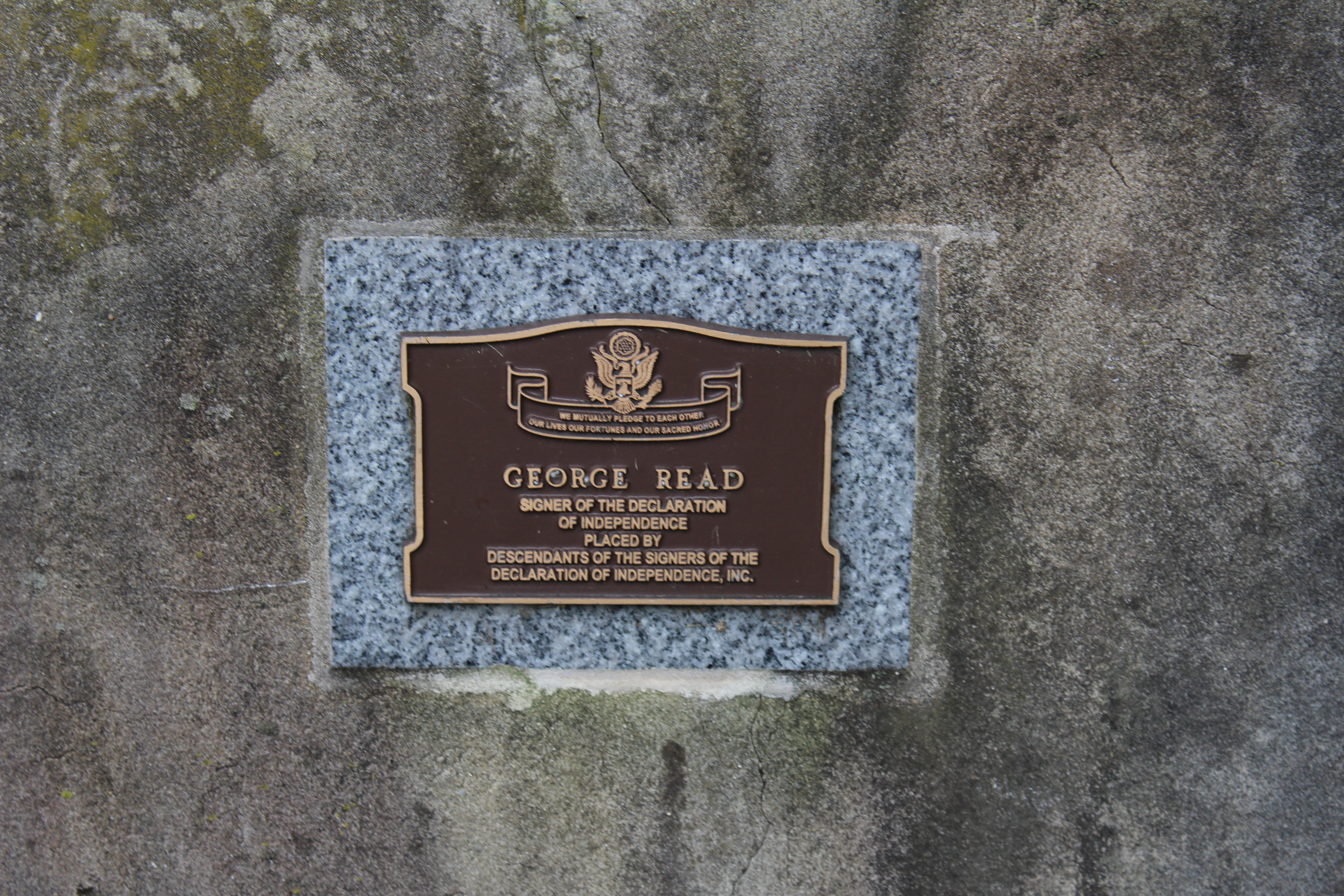
George Read plaque at Immanuel Episcopal Church graveyard in New Castle, Delaware

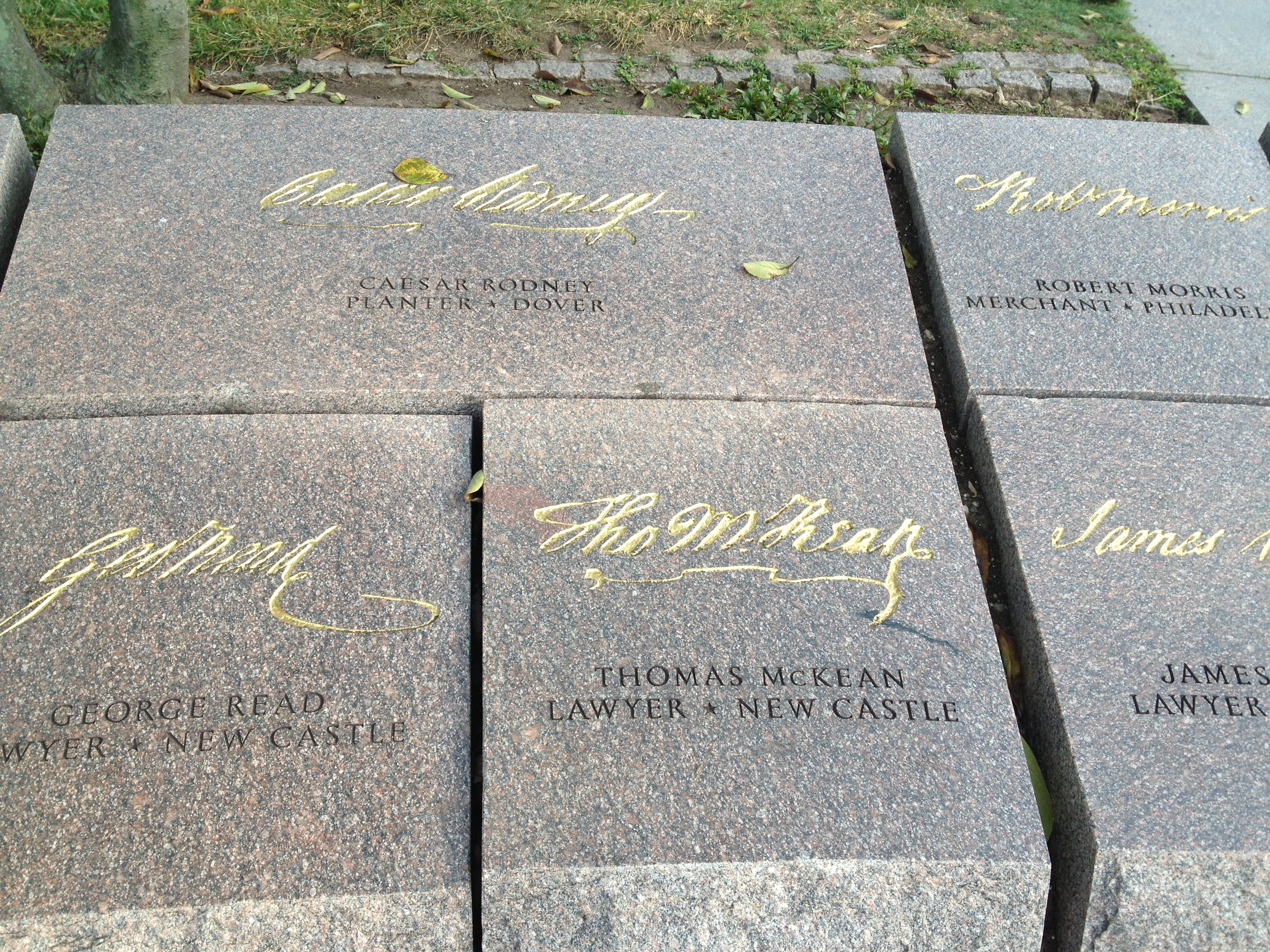
The Memorial to the 56 Signers of the Declaration of Independence in Washington, D.C., Read's depicted signature is at the lower left

Read died at New Castle on September 21, 1798, from heart problems and is buried there in the Immanuel Episcopal Church Cemetery.

William T. Read in his Life and Correspondence describes Read as "tall, slightly and gracefully formed, with pleasing features and lustrous brown eyes. His manners were dignified, bordering upon austerity, but courteous, and at times captivating. He commanded entire confidence, not only from his profound legal knowledge, sound judgment, and impartial decisions but from his severe integrity and the purity of his private character." However, a fellow delegate to the Constitutional Convention of 1787 noted that "his legal abilities are said to be very great, but his powers of oratory are fatiguing and tiresome to the last degree; his voice is feeble and his articulation so bad that few can have patience to attend him." Historians like John Monroe have generally recognized that all in all, Read was the dominating figure in Delaware politics during his career, directly or indirectly providing consistent and reliable leadership to the new state.

His home, Stonum, is a historic landmark. There is a school in New Castle and a dorm at the University of Delaware named for Read.

== In popular culture ==
In the Broadway musical 1776, Read is portrayed in a minor role as a proper, conservative, somewhat effete, and wealthy planter who has difficulty getting along with the other two members of the Delaware contingent who are for Independence. Duane Bodin played the character in the original Broadway cast and Leo Leyden appeared in the film version.

== Family ==
Read's brother Thomas was an officer in the Continental Navy during the war. Another brother, James, was an officer in the Continental Army and was later active in managing the navy under the Articles of Confederation. Read's son George Read Jr. served as the first U.S. Attorney for Delaware, and his grandson George Read III served as the second. Another son, John Read, was a noted lawyer and banker of Philadelphia. Read's great-granddaughter, Louisa, married Major Benjamin Kendrick Pierce, the brother of future President Franklin Pierce.

Read family tree
- John Read (1688-1756) - married Mary (Howell) Read
  - George Read (1733-1798) - married (Jan 11, 1763) Gertrude Ross Till (1735-1802)
    - George Read Jr. (1765-1836) - married (Oct 30, 1786) his cousin Mary Thompson (1767-1815), the daughter of General William Thompson.
      - George Read III (1788-1836) - married (April 19, 1810) Louisa Ridgeley Dorsey (1792-1835)
        - George Read IV (1812-1859) - married (Nov 9, 1843) Susan Chapman (-1872)
          - William Thompson Read (1857-1896) - married (Jan 7, 1879) Antonia Pettit Saunders (1857-1940)
            - William Saunders Read (1880-1916) - married (Jan 9, 1905) Estella C. Cook (1882-1968)
              - William Thane Read (1912-1996) - married (Dec 23, 1938) Mabel Gertrude Gill (1912-1999)
      - Catherine Anne (Read) McLane (1794-1826)
      - William Thompson Read (1792-1873) - married Sally Thomas Read and founded the Delaware Historical Society
      - John Dickinson Read (1803-1831) - never married
      - Mary Gertrude Read (1805-1877)
    - John Read (1769-1854) - married (1796) Martha Meredith Read
      - John Meredith Read Sr. (1797-1874) - married (1828) Priscilla Marshall (–1841) and (1855) Amelia Thompson
        - John Meredith Read Jr. (1837-1896) - married (April 7, 1859) Delphine Marie Pumpelly (1833–1902)
  - Thomas Read (1740-1788)
  - James Read (1743-1822)

== Positions held ==
Elections for the Delaware General Assembly were held on October 1, and members took office on October 20 or the following weekday. The colonial attorney general was appointed by the Crown. The Legislative Council was created in 1776, and its councilmen had a three-year term. State assemblymen had a one-year term. The whole General Assembly chose the Continental Congressmen for a one-year term and the state president for a three-year term. Read served as interim state president, filling the vacancy created by the resignation of McKean. The chief justice of the state Supreme Court was also selected by the General Assembly for the life of the person appointed. The General Assembly chose the U.S. Senators, who took office March 4 for a six-year term. However, Read's first term was only two years to establish a rotation.

Public Offices
Office	Type	Location	Began office	Ended office	notes
Attorney General	Judiciary	New Castle	October 20, 1763	October 20, 1774	Crown
Assemblyman	Legislature	New Castle	October 20, 1764	October 21, 1765	
Assemblyman	Legislature	New Castle	October 21, 1765	October 20, 1766	
Assemblyman	Legislature	New Castle	October 20, 1766	October 20, 1767	
Assemblyman	Legislature	New Castle	October 20, 1767	October 20, 1768	
Assemblyman	Legislature	New Castle	October 20, 1768	October 20, 1769	
Assemblyman	Legislature	New Castle	October 20, 1769	October 20, 1770	
Assemblyman	Legislature	New Castle	October 21, 1770	October 20, 1771	
Assemblyman	Legislature	New Castle	October 21, 1771	October 20, 1772	
Assemblyman	Legislature	New Castle	October 20, 1772	October 20, 1773	
Assemblyman	Legislature	New Castle	October 20, 1773	October 20, 1774	
Continental Congressman	Legislature	Philadelphia	September 5, 1774	October 26, 1774	
Assemblyman	Legislature	New Castle	October 20, 1774	October 20, 1775	
Continental Congressman	Legislature	Philadelphia	May 10, 1775	October 21, 1775	
Assemblyman	Legislature	New Castle	October 20, 1775	June 15, 1776	
Continental Congressman	Legislature	Philadelphia	October 21, 1775	November 7, 1776	
Delegate	Convention	New Castle	August 27, 1776	September 21, 1776	State Constitution
Councilman	Legislature	Dover	October 28, 1776	October 20, 1779	Speaker
Continental Congressman	Legislature	Philadelphia	November 7, 1776	December 17, 1777	
State President	Executive	Dover	October 20, 1777	March 31, 1778	acting
Assemblyman	Legislature	Dover	October 20, 1780	October 20, 1781	
Assemblyman	Legislature	Dover	October 20, 1781	October 20, 1782	
Councilman	Legislature	Dover	October 20, 1782	October 20, 1785	
Councilman	Legislature	Dover	October 20, 1785	October 20, 1788	
Delegate	Convention	Philadelphia	May 14, 1787	September 1, 1787	U.S. Constitution
U.S. Senator	Legislature	New York	March 4, 1789	March 3, 1791	
U.S. Senator	Legislature	Philadelphia	March 4, 1791	September 18, 1793	resigned
Chief Justice	Judiciary	Dover	September 30, 1793	September 21, 1798	State Supreme Court

Delaware General Assembly service
Dates	Assembly	Chamber	Majority	Governor	Committees	District
1776/77	1st	State Council	non-partisan	John McKinly	Speaker	New Castle at-large
1777/78	2nd	State Council	non-partisan	Caesar Rodney	Speaker	New Castle at-large
1778/79	3rd	State Council	non-partisan	Caesar Rodney		New Castle at-large
1780/81	5th	State House	non-partisan	Caesar Rodney		New Castle at-large
1781/82	6th	State House	non-partisan	John Dickinson		New Castle at-large
1782/83	7th	State Council	non-partisan	Nicholas Van Dyke		New Castle at-large
1783/84	8th	State Council	non-partisan	Nicholas Van Dyke		New Castle at-large
1784/85	9th	State Council	non-partisan	Nicholas Van Dyke		New Castle at-large
1785/86	10th	State Council	non-partisan	Nicholas Van Dyke		New Castle at-large
1786/87	11th	State Council	non-partisan	Thomas Collins		New Castle at-large
1787/88	12th	State Council	non-partisan	Thomas Collins		New Castle at-large

United States Congressional service
Dates	Congress	Chamber	Majority	President	Committees	Class/District
1789–1791	1st	U.S. Senate	Pro-Administration	George Washington		class 1
1791–1793	2nd	U.S. Senate	Pro-Administration	George Washington		class 1
1793–1795	3rd	U.S. Senate	Pro-Administration	George Washington		class 1

== See also ==
- Memorial to the 56 Signers of the Declaration of Independence

== Notes ==
Political offices
Preceded by Thomas McKean	President of Delaware; 1781–1783	Succeeded by Caesar Rodney
U.S. Senate
Preceded by Office established	U.S. senator from Delaware; 1789–1793	Succeeded by Henry Latimer
