= George Read Jr. =

American lawyer (1765–1836)

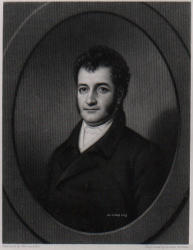

United States Attorney for the District of Delaware
- In office 1789–1816
- President: George Washington; John Adams; Thomas Jefferson; James Monroe
- Preceded by: Office created
- Succeeded by: George Read III

Personal details
- Born: August 29, 1765 New Castle, Delaware Colony
- Died: September 3, 1836 (aged 71)
- Party: Republican
- Parent: George Read (father)
- Occupation: Lawyer

George Read Jr. (August 29, 1765 – September 3, 1836) was an American lawyer who served as the first U.S. Attorney for the District of Delaware. The son of one of the nation's founding fathers, Read made numerous attempts at higher political office but was ultimately unsuccessful each time. Despite this, his substantial wealth acquired through his family and law career allowed him to build one of the largest homes in Delaware, which is today maintained as a museum.

== Early life and family ==
Coat of arms of George Read Jr.

George Read Jr. was born on August 29, 1765, in New Castle, Delaware. His father was George Read, a prominent lawyer and politician who would go on to sign both the Declaration of Independence and the Constitution. His mother was Gertrude Ross Read, the daughter of Rev. George Ross (the first rector of the Immanuel Episcopal Church on the Green) and the sister of lawyer George Ross, another future signatory to the Declaration. At the time of Read's birth, his father was serving as both the Crown Attorney General for the Delaware Colony as well as a member of the Delaware Assembly. By the time the boy turned ten, his father was serving in the Continental Congress in Philadelphia.

Read was admitted to the bar in 1785 and opened a law office in New Castle. In 1786, he wed his cousin Mary Thompson, the daughter of General William Thompson.

== Political career ==
In 1789, the same year his father began his service as a senator in the first session of the U.S. Senate, George Read Jr. received an appointment from President George Washington as the first U.S. Attorney for the District of Delaware thanks to his father's efforts. The job meant that Read would be responsible for prosecuting cases brought in federal court in the state of Delaware.

In 1803, Read was nominated by the Democratic-Republicans for a U.S. Senate seat in Delaware, losing 20–9 to Federalist incumbent Samuel White.

Read was called to testify before the Senate as a prosecution witness in the 1805 impeachment trial of Supreme Court Justice Samuel Chase. Read had been serving as the prosecuting attorney before a grand jury in the New Castle Court House in 1800 when Chase refused to discharge the grand jury until they investigated a local printer for possible charges under the Sedition Act. Despite Read's testimony, Chase was acquitted by the Senate.

In 1812, upon hearing of the death of U.S. District Judge Gunning Bedford Jr., Read wrote a letter to President James Madison seeking to be appointed to the bench. This was Read's first of several attempts at securing for himself a higher political office. Madison instead appointed John Fisher, the brother-in-law of Madison's former Attorney General, Caesar Augustus Rodney.

U.S. Representative Henry M. Ridgely declined to seek reelection to the House in 1814, and Read ran for the office. Read ran as a Republican, but Delaware was one of the few states that remained fertile ground for the Federalist Party, which had won the state in the presidential elections of 1808 and 1812. Read lost by 10%. He made a second attempt at running for a seat in the House in 1818, but lost again, albeit by a much narrower margin of 1.65%.

Read sent a letter of resignation from his post as U.S. Attorney in 1815, and he was succeeded by his son, George Read III.

In 1820, at the request of Attorney General William Wirt, Read collaborated with Caesar A. Rodney in preparing a report for Secretary of War John C. Calhoun detailing the legal history of Delaware's colonial deeds and rights to the Delaware River in order to resolve a dispute over the ownership of Fort Delaware.

Judge Fisher died in 1823, and Read wrote a letter to Rodney on April 22 applying for the position of U.S. District Judge for a second time. He was rebuffed again, however, as President James Monroe appointed Willard Hall to the bench instead.

In 1831, Delaware convened a convention to draft a new state Constitution. Read was a delegate to the convention, alongside Judge Hall. During the convention, the two were generally aligned in advocating in favor of making substantial revisions to the Constitution in New Castle County's interests.

== Read House and Gardens ==
Read purchased a lot in New Castle immediately adjacent to his father's home in 1797, where he began building a grand mansion for himself and his new family. George Read Sr. helped design the plan for his son's home. The mansion was under construction for the next six years, finally being completed in 1803. The Federal-style home contained 14,000 square feet of living space spread out over 22 rooms. It was the largest home in Delaware at the time.

Read purchased the lot opposite his home as well. That lot bordered the Delaware River, and Read maintained it as an empty lot in order to have an unobstructed view of the river from his home. Architect Benjamin Latrobe, who resided for several years in New Castle and became an acquaintance of Read's, wrote that he found the arrangement quite wasteful, as the waterfront lot was amongst the most valuable in town.

In 1824, much of New Castle was destroyed by fire, but Read's home survived. The next-door home of his late father, however, did not. Read had that piece of property converted into a formal garden.

== Death and legacy ==
George Read Jr. died at his home in New Castle on September 3, 1836. He is buried at the cemetery of the Immanuel Episcopal Church on the Green, near his home in New Castle. His father is also buried there. In 1967, the National Park Service declared the New Castle Historic District to be a National Historic Landmark. Both the Immanuel Episcopal Church and the Read House and Gardens are contributing properties to this landmark district. The church and home are also both adjacent to the Green, which is a part of the First State National Historical Park. In 2017, the Read House was made a National Historic Landmark in its own right, in addition to remaining a contributing structure in the New Castle Historic District.

One of Read's sons, William Thompson Read, was a founder of the Delaware Historical Society. The Society purchased the Read House in 1975 and it is currently open to the public as a museum.
