= New Castle, Delaware =

City in Delaware, United States

- City
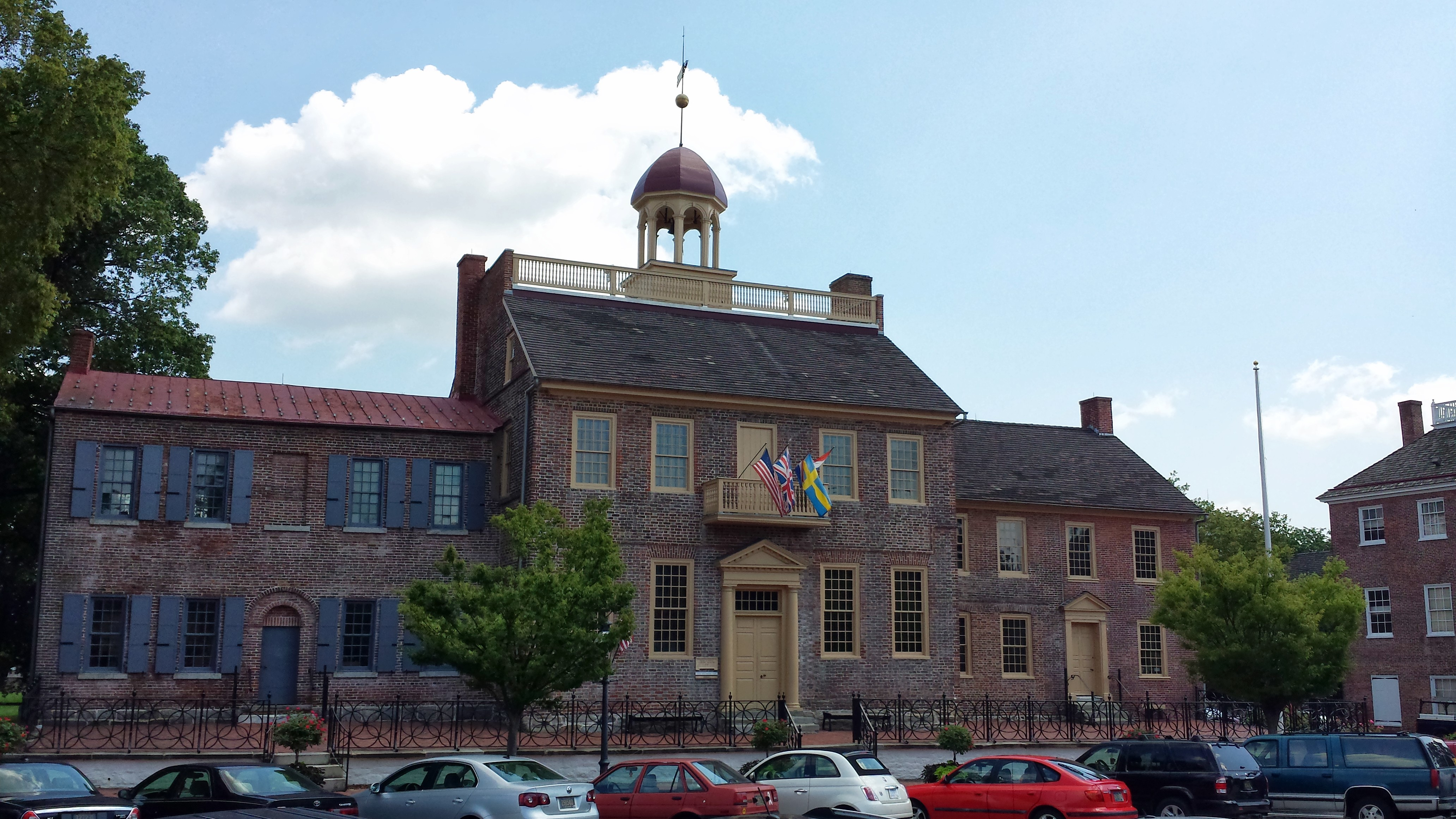
- Old New Castle County Courthouse

- Flag Seal

- Location of New Castle in New Castle County, Delaware (left) and of New Castle County in Delaware (right)

- Location in Delaware New Castle (the United States)
- Coordinates: 39°39′43″N 75°33′59″W
- Country: United States
- State: Delaware
- County: New Castle
- Founded: 1651

Area
  - Total: 3.52 sq mi (9.12 km^{2})
  - Land: 3.48 sq mi (9.01 km^{2})
  - Water: 0.042 sq mi (0.11 km^{2})
- Elevation: 10 ft (3.0 m)

Population (2020)
  - Total: 5,551
  - Density: 1,596.0/sq mi (616.23/km^{2})
- Time zone: UTC−5 (Eastern (EST))
  - Summer (DST): UTC−4 (EDT)
- ZIP codes: 19720-19721, 19726
- Area code: 302
- FIPS code: 10-50800
- GNIS feature ID: 214379
- Website: newcastlecity.delaware.gov

New Castle is a city in New Castle County, Delaware, United States. The city is located six miles (10 km) south of Wilmington and is situated on the Delaware River. As of 2020, the city's population was 5,551. New Castle constitutes part of the Philadelphia metropolitan area.

== History ==
=== 17th century ===
New Castle was originally settled by the Dutch West India Company in 1651 under the leadership of Peter Stuyvesant on the site of a former indigenous village, "Tomakonck" ("Place of the Beaver"), to assert their claim to the area based on a prior agreement with the original inhabitants of the area. The Dutch originally named the settlement Fort Casimir, but this was changed to Fort Trinity following its seizure by the colony of New Sweden on Trinity Sunday in 1654. The Dutch conquered the entire colony of New Sweden the following year and rechristened the fort as Nieuw-Amstel, named after the Amstel. This marked the end of the Swedish colony in Delaware as an official entity, but it remained a semi-autonomous unit within the New Netherland colony and the cultural, social, and religious influence of the Swedish settlers remained strong. As the settlement grew, Dutch authorities laid out a grid of streets and established a common green in the town's center, which continues to this day.

In 1664, the English seized the entire New Netherland colony in the Second Anglo-Dutch War. They changed the name of the town to "New Castle" and made it the capital of their Delaware Colony. The Dutch regained the town in 1673 during the Third Anglo-Dutch War but it was returned to Great Britain the next year under the Treaty of Westminster. In 1680, New Castle was conveyed to William Penn by the Duke of York by livery of seisin and was Penn's landing place when he first set foot on American soil on October 27, 1682. This transfer to Penn was contested by Lord Baltimore and the boundary dispute was not resolved until the 1763-1767 survey conducted by Mason and Dixon, now famed in history as the Mason–Dixon line.

=== 18th century ===
Prior to the establishment of Penn's Philadelphia, New Castle was a center of government. After being transferred to Penn, Delaware's Swedish, Dutch, and English residents became accustomed to the relaxed culture of the Restoration monarchy and grew uncomfortable with the more conservative Quaker influence, so Delaware petitioned for a separate legislature, which was finally granted in 1702. Delaware formally broke from Pennsylvania in 1704. New Castle again became the seat of the colonial government, thriving with the various judges and lawyers that fueled the economy. Many smaller houses were torn down and replaced in this era. In February, 1777, John McKinly was elected the first President of Delaware, a title later renamed "Governor". During the Revolution, when New Castle was besieged by William Howe, the government elected to move its functions south to Dover in May, 1777. McKinly was captured by the British and held prisoner for several months. New Castle remained the county seat until after the Civil War, when that status was transferred to Wilmington. Three of the 56 signers of the Declaration of Independence were from New Castle: Thomas McKean, George Read, and George Ross.

=== 19th century ===
The 16-mile (26 km) portage between the Delaware River and Chesapeake Bay saved a 400-mile (640 km) trip around the Delmarva Peninsula, so this brought passengers, goods, and business to New Castle's port. In the years following the Revolution, a turnpike was built to facilitate travel between the two major waterways. Later, New Castle became the eastern terminus of the New Castle and Frenchtown Railroad, the second-oldest rail line in the country, launched in 1828 with horse-drawn rail cars, then converting to steam power when an engine was purchased from Great Britain in 1832. The line traversed the Delmarva Peninsula, running to the Elk River, Maryland, from where passengers changed to packet boats for further travel to Baltimore and points south. This helped the New Castle economy to further boom; however, by 1840, rail lines were in place between Philadelphia and Baltimore, which had a stop in Wilmington, thus leaving New Castle to deal with a substantial decline in traffic and revenue.

The decline in New Castle's economy had the long-range fortunate effect of preventing most residents from making any significant structural changes to their homes. The many buildings of historic New Castle have largely not been upgraded or restored and appear much as they did in the Colonial and Federal periods.

=== 20th century ===
Since 1927, New Castle has offered tours of historical homes, churches, and gardens, which are typically held annually on the third Saturday of May. Householders dress in colonial costumes and an admittance fee, used toward the maintenance of the town's many historic buildings, is charged. Annually in June, New Castle holds its annual Separation Day celebration.

On April 28, 1961, an F3 tornado hit the north side. Although no fatalities or injuries occurred, it was the only tornado of this magnitude ever recorded in Delaware during the Fujita scale era.

== Geography ==
According to the U.S. Census Bureau, the city has a total area of 3.2 square miles (8.2 km^{2}), of which 0.1 sq mi (0.3 km^{2}, 3.79%) is covered by water.

The city is the home of Broad Dyke, the first dyke built in the United States.

The cupola of the court house is the center of the "Twelve-Mile Circle" that defines much of the border between Delaware and Pennsylvania. The circle also forms a small portion of the border between Delaware and New Jersey and Delaware and Maryland.

== Demographics ==
Historical population
Census	Pop.	Note	%±
1850	1,202		—
1860	1,902		58.2%
1870	1,916		0.7%
1880	3,700		93.1%
1890	4,010		8.4%
1900	3,380		−15.7%
1910	3,351		−0.9%
1920	3,854		15.0%
1930	4,131		7.2%
1940	4,414		6.9%
1950	5,396		22.2%
1960	4,469		−17.2%
1970	4,814		7.7%
1980	4,907		1.9%
1990	4,837		−1.4%
2000	4,862		0.5%
2010	5,285		8.7%
2020	5,551		5.0%
U.S. Decennial Census

=== 2020 census ===
As of the 2020 census, New Castle had a population of 5,551. The median age was 45.8 years; 17.1% of residents were under 18 and 22.4% were 65 or older. For every 100 females, there were 90.4 males, and for every 100 females 18 and over, there were 87.2 males 18 and over.

All of the residents lived in urban areas, while nine lived in rural areas.

Of the 2,482 households in New Castle, 24.5% had children under 18 living in them, 35.2% were married-couple households, 21.3% were households with a male householder and no spouse or partner present, and 35.3% were households with a female householder and no spouse or partner present. About 35.4% of all households were made up of individuals, and 15.5% had someone living alone who was 65 or older.

The city had 2,612 housing units, of which 5.0% were vacant. The homeowner vacancy rate was 1.0% and the rental vacancy rate was 3.7%.

Racial composition as of the 2020 census
Race	Number	Percent
White	3,331	60.0%
Black or African American	1,569	28.3%
American Indian and Alaska Native	18	0.3%
Asian	72	1.3%
Native Hawaiian and other Pacific Islander	1	0.0%
Some other race	219	3.9%
Two or more races	341	6.1%
Hispanic or Latino (of any race)	461	8.3%

=== 2000 census ===
As of the 2000 United States census, 4,862 people, 2,012 households, and 1,339 families resided in the city. The population density was 1,594.6 inhabitants per square mile (615.7/km^{2}). The 2,199 housing units had an average density of 721.2 per square mile (278.5/km^{2}). The racial makeup of the city was 77.48% White, 20.20% African American, 0.25% Native American, 0.39% Asian, 0.84% from other races, and 0.84% from two or more races. Hispanics or Latinos of any race were 2.41% of the population.

Of the 2,012 households, 26.2% had children under 18 living with them, 47.1% were married couples living together, 14.9% had a female householder with no husband present, and 33.4% were not families. About 27.7% of all households were made up of individuals, and 9.8% had someone living alone who was 65 or older. The average household size was 2.42, and the average family size was 2.93.

In the city, the age distribution was 21.8% under 18, 7.8% from 18 to 24, 28.6% from 25 to 44, 27.5% from 45 to 64, and 14.4% who were 65 or older. The median age was 40 years. For every 100 females, there were 88.3 males. For every 100 females 18 and over, there were 85.6 males.

The median income in the city for a household was $52,449 and for a family was $56,368. Males had a median income of $40,153 versus $31,571 for females. The per capita income for the city was $24,052. About 3.9% of families and 5.3% of the population were below the poverty line, including 5.8% of those under 18 and 7.5% of those 65 or over.

== Historic sites ==
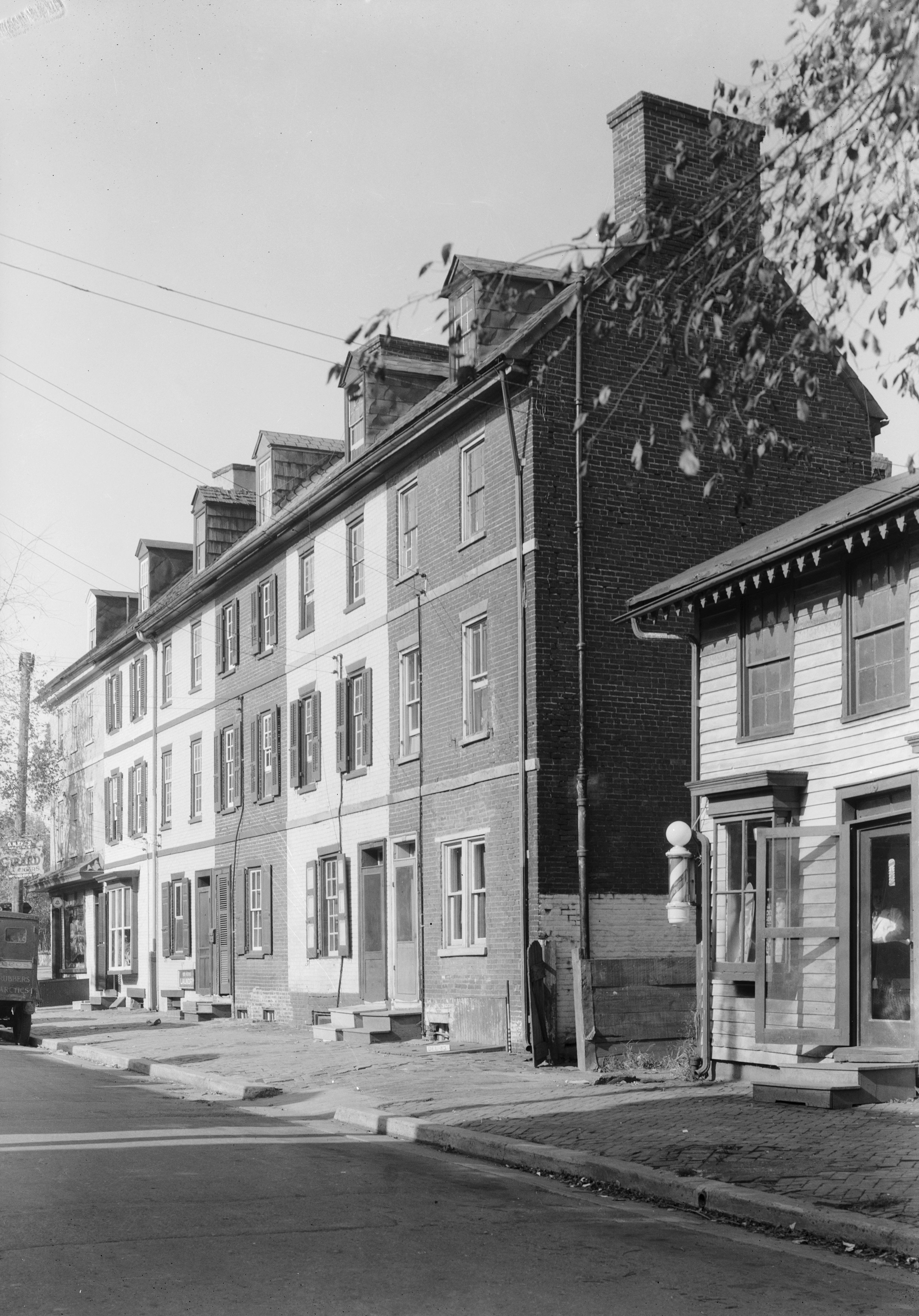
Cloud's Row in 1936

New Castle Historic District is an area about four blocks square in the center of the city with about 500 historic buildings, built between 1700 and 1940. This area contains one of the highest concentrations of well-preserved buildings dating from the 17th to early 19th centuries. It was declared a National Historic Landmark in 1967.

The New Castle Historic District was listed on the National Register of Historic Places (NRHP) in 1967 and was relisted, with enlarged boundaries and expanded period of significance as a National Historic Landmark District, in 1984. The historic district then covered 135 acres (55 ha) and includes Amstel House and Old Courthouse, which are separately listed on the NRHP. The area includes 461 contributing buildings, one other contributing structure, and one contributing object.

The New Castle Court House, the Green, and the Sheriff's House are parts of First State National Historical Park, a unit of the national park system. The park interprets Delaware's settlement and role in the founding of the United States.

Notable sites the historic district include:

- Amstel House, home of New Castle Historical Society
- Stonum, home of George Read, an 18th-century Delaware politician
- Read House and Garden, former home of Read's son George Read Jr., built between 1801 and 1804
- Immanuel Episcopal Church on the Green
- New Castle Court House Museum, the original colonial capitol and first State House of Delaware, served as the courthouse until 1882, when the county seat was moved to Wilmington. Its cupola served as the center of the Twelve-Mile Circle, which defined Delaware's state border with Pennsylvania.
- Old Dutch House, a small early dwelling built c. 1700
- Thomas McKean House, the former home of Thomas McKean, a Founding Father
- New Castle Presbyterian Church, founded in 1657
- Lesley-Travers Mansion, built in 1855

Bellanca Airfield, located outside of the historic district, is the site of the former Bellanca Aircraft Corporation factory, which operated in New Castle from 1928 to 1960 and built over 3,000 airplanes. The Delaware Aviation Hall of Fame Museum is located in its hangar. Also nearby are Buena Vista, Glebe House, The Hermitage, New Castle Ice Piers, Penn Farm of the Trustees of the New Castle Common, and Swanwyck, all listed on the NRHP.

== Education ==
New Castle is served by the Colonial School District. It operates William Penn High School. Previously, New Castle was in the New Castle-Gunning Bedford School District. That district merged into the New Castle County School District in 1978. That district was divided into four districts, among them the Colonial district, in 1981.

Private schools located in New Castle include: St. Peter's Catholic School (of the Roman Catholic Diocese of Wilmington) and Delaware Valley Classical School.

Serviam Girls Academy was formerly at Holy Spirit Parish, which has a New Castle postal address.

New Castle Public Library is the public library.

== Infrastructure ==
=== Transportation ===
U.S. Route 13 and U.S. Route 40 are the most significant highways serving New Castle directly. They pass along the northwest edge of the city concurrently along Dupont Highway.

Delaware Route 9 runs southwest-to-northeast through New Castle, passing through the city along 7th Street, Washington Street, Delaware Street, and Ferry Cut Off Street; the route bypasses the historic area. DE 9 heads north to Wilmington and south to Delaware City. Delaware Route 141 heads north from New Castle on Basin Road and provides a bypass to the west of Wilmington. Delaware Route 273 heads west from New Castle on Frenchtown Road and provides access to Christiana and Newark. Several important roads are located just outside the city limits. Interstate 295 passes north of New Castle and crosses the Delaware River on the Delaware Memorial Bridge to New Jersey, with DE 9 providing access to New Castle from I-295.

The Wilmington Airport (formerly New Castle Airport) is located northwest of New Castle along US 13/US 40. The airport offers general-aviation and commercial air service and is home to a unit of the Delaware Air National Guard.

A freight line operated by the Norfolk Southern Railway passes through New Castle. The nearest passenger rail station to New Castle is Wilmington station in Wilmington, which is served by Amtrak and SEPTA Regional Rail's Wilmington/Newark Line.

DART First State provides bus service to New Castle along Routes 15 and 51, which both run between downtown Wilmington and the Christiana Mall and offer connections to multiple bus routes serving points across northern New Castle County.

=== Utilities ===
The Municipal Services Commission of the City of New Castle provides electricity and water to the city. The electric department is a member of the Delaware Municipal Electric Corporation. Natural gas service in New Castle is provided by Delmarva Power, a subsidiary of Exelon. The city's Public Works department provides trash and recycling collection to New Castle.

== Government ==
Baylor Women's Correctional Institution of the Delaware Department of Correction is in an unincorporated area in New Castle County, and has a postal address stating "New Castle".

== Notable people ==
- Walter W. Bacon, 60th governor of Delaware
- John Walter Bratton, songwriter
- William C. Frazer, American lawyer and judge
- Thomas Holcomb, commandant of the United States Marine Corps
- Dave May, former MLB player
- Thomas McKean, lawyer, politician and a signer of the Declaration of Independence
- Vinnie Moore, guitarist
- George Read I, signer of the Declaration of Independence and the Constitution, second governor of Delaware
- George Ross, signer of the Declaration of Independence
- Jeff Otah, NFL player
- Ryan Phillippe, actor
- Carol Quillen, university president
- Devin Smith, professional basketball player for Maccabi Tel Aviv
- Charles Thomas, 25th governor of Delaware
- Nicholas Van Dyke I, president of Delaware
- Nicholas Van Dyke II, son of Nicholas Van Dyke I, U.S. senator
- Jalen Duren, professional basketball player for the Detroit Pistons
- Joe Biden, former senator from Delaware and 46th President of the United States

== In film ==
New Castle has served as the filming location for numerous films and television series, including Dead Poets Society, Beloved, and River Ridge.
