= 11th Delaware General Assembly =

American legislative session

←	10th	12th	→

Overview
- Legislative body: Delaware General Assembly
- Term: October 20, 1786 – October 20, 1787

The 11th Delaware General Assembly was a meeting of the legislative branch of the state government, consisting of the Delaware Legislative Council and the Delaware House of Assembly. Elections were held the first day of October and terms began on the twentieth day of October. The Assembly met in the state capital, Dover, convening October 20, 1786, in the first year of the administration of Delaware President Thomas Collins.

The apportionment of seats was permanently assigned to three councilors and seven assemblymen for each of the three counties. Population of the county did not effect the number of delegates.

== Leadership ==
=== Legislative Council ===
- George Craighead, New Castle County

=== House of Assembly ===
- John Cook, Kent County

== Members ==
=== Legislative Council ===
Councilors were elected by the public for a three-year term, one third posted each year.

New Castle County

- George Craighead
- George Read
- Nicholas Van Dyke Sr.

Kent County

- John Banning
- Silas Snow
- James Tilton

Sussex County

- Alexander Laws
- Henry Neill
- Daniel Polk

=== House of Assembly ===
Assemblymen were elected by the public for a one-year term.

New Castle County

- Gunning Bedford Sr.
- Jacob Broom
- Thomas Duff
- Thomas Evans
- Isaac Grantham
- Peter Hyatt
- Alexander Porter Jr.

Kent County

- Richard Bassett
- Joshua Clayton
- John Cook
- Jehu Davis
- John Gordon
- Mark McCall
- Thomas Rodney

Sussex County

- Jeremiah Cannon
- Edward Dingle
- Nathaniel Hayes
- George Mitchell
- William Moore
- Charles Polk Sr.
- Rhodes Shankland

== Places with more information ==
- Delaware Historical Society; website; 505 North Market Street, Wilmington, Delaware 19801; (302) 655-7161.
- University of Delaware; Library website; 181 South College Avenue, Newark, Delaware 19717; (302) 831-2965.
