= 13th Delaware General Assembly =

American legislative session

| ← | 12th | 14th | → |

Overview
- Legislative body: Delaware General Assembly
- Term: October 20, 1788 – October 20, 1789

The 13th Delaware General Assembly was a meeting of the legislative branch of the state government, consisting of the Delaware Legislative Council and the Delaware House of Assembly. Elections were held the first day of October and terms began on the twentieth day of October. It met in Dover, Delaware, convening October 20, 1788, and was the third year of the administration of President Thomas Collins. He died March 29, 1789, and was replaced by President Jehu Davis.

The apportionment of seats was permanently assigned to three councilors and seven assemblymen for each of the three counties. Population of the county did not effect the number of delegates.

== Leadership ==
=== Legislative Council ===
- George Mitchell, Sussex County

=== House of Assembly ===
- Jehu Davis, Kent County

== Members ==
=== Legislative Council ===
Councilors were elected by the public for a three-year term, one third posted each year.

New Castle County

- Gunning Bedford Sr.
- Thomas Kean
- Nicholas Van Dyke Sr.

Kent County

- John Banning
- John Cook
- Nicholas Ridgely

Sussex County

- Isaac Horsey
- George Mitchell
- Daniel Polk

=== House of Assembly ===
Assemblymen were elected by the public for a one-year term.

New Castle County

- Jacob Broom
- Peter Hyatt
- John James
- Henry Latimer
- Thomas May
- Thomas Montgomery
- Alexander Porter Jr.

Kent County

- Risdon Bishop
- Benjamin Coombe
- Jehu Davis
- John Gordon
- James Raymond
- George Truitt
- John Vining

Sussex County

- Jeremiah Cannon
- Isaac Cooper
- Nathaniel Hayes
- Israel Holland
- Charles Polk Sr.
- Rhodes Shankland
- Peter F. Wright

== Places with more information ==
- Delaware Historical Society; website; 505 North Market Street, Wilmington, Delaware 19801; (302) 655-7161.
- University of Delaware; Library website; 181 South College Avenue, Newark, Delaware 19717; (302) 831-2965.
