= 12th Delaware General Assembly =

American legislative session

←	11th	13th	→

Overview
- Legislative body: Delaware General Assembly
- Term: October 20, 1787 – October 20, 1788

The 12th Delaware General Assembly was a meeting of the legislative branch of the state government, consisting of the Delaware Legislative Council and the Delaware House of Assembly. Elections were held the first day of October and terms began on the twentieth day of October. It met in Dover, Delaware, convening October 20, 1787, and was the second year of the administration of President Thomas Collins.

The apportionment of seats was permanently assigned to three councilors and seven assemblymen for each of the three counties. Population of the county did not affect the number of delegates.

== Leadership ==
=== Legislative Council ===
- Thomas McDonough, New Castle County

=== House of Assembly ===
- Thomas Rodney, Kent County

== Members ==
=== Legislative Council ===
Councilors were elected by the public for a three-year term, one third posted each year.

New Castle County

- Thomas McDonough
- George Read
- Nicholas Van Dyke Sr.

Kent County

- John Banning
- John Cook
- James Tilton

Sussex County

- Isaac Horsey
- Alexander Laws
- Daniel Polk

=== House of Assembly ===
Assemblymen were elected by the public for a one-year term.

New Castle County

- Joshua Clayton
- Thomas Evans
- Isaac Grantham
- Henry Latimer
- Thomas May
- Alexander Porter Jr.
- Thomas Robinson

Kent County

- Jehu Davis
- John Gordon
- Mark McCall
- James Raymond
- John Revell
- Thomas Rodney
- John Vining

Sussex County

- John W. Batson
- Jeremiah Cannon
- John Collins
- Isaac Cooper
- Nathaniel Hayes
- Charles Polk Sr.
- Peter Robinson

== Places with more information ==
- Delaware Historical Society; website; 505 North Market Street, Wilmington, Delaware 19801; (302) 655-7161.
- University of Delaware; Library website; 181 South College Avenue, Newark, Delaware 19717; (302) 831-2965.
