= 8th Delaware General Assembly =

American legislative session

←	7th	9th	→

Overview
- Legislative body: Delaware General Assembly
- Term: October 20, 1783 – October 20, 1784

The 8th Delaware General Assembly was a meeting of the legislative branch of the state government, consisting of the Delaware Legislative Council and the Delaware House of Assembly. Elections were held the first day of October and terms began on the twentieth day of October. The Assembly met in the state capital, Dover, convening October 20, 1783, in the first year of the administration of Delaware President Nicholas Van Dyke Sr.

The apportionment of seats was permanently assigned to three councilors and seven assemblymen for each of the three counties. Population of the county did not affect the number of delegates.

== Leadership ==
=== Legislative Council ===
- Caesar Rodney, Kent County

=== House of Assembly ===
- Robert Bryan, New Castle County

== Members ==
=== Legislative Council ===
Councilors were elected by the public for a three-year term, one third posted each year.

New Castle County

- Isaac Grantham
- Thomas McDonough
- George Read

Kent County

- John Banning
- Richard Bassett
- Caesar Rodney

Sussex County

- John Collins
- Joshua Polk
- William Polk

=== House of Assembly ===
Assemblymen were elected by the public for a one-year term.

New Castle County

- Gunning Bedford Sr.
- Robert Bryan
- Joshua Clayton
- Thomas Duff
- John James
- Thomas Kean
- Samuel Smith

Kent County

- Philip Barratt
- John Cook
- Jehu Davis
- John Gordon
- William Molleston
- Charles Ridgely
- Edward White

Sussex County

- John Collins
- James Douglass
- William J. Hall
- David Hazzard
- Simon Kollock
- William Peery
- Nathaniel Waples

== Places with more information ==
- Delaware Historical Society; website; 505 North Market Street, Wilmington, Delaware 19801; (302) 655-7161.
- University of Delaware; Library website; 181 South College Avenue, Newark, Delaware 19717; (302) 831-2965.
