= 5th Delaware General Assembly =

American legislative session

←	4th	6th	→

Overview
- Legislative body: Delaware General Assembly
- Term: October 20, 1780 – October 20, 1781

The 5th Delaware General Assembly was a meeting of the legislative branch of the state government, consisting of the Delaware Legislative Council and the Delaware House of Assembly. Elections were held the first day of October and terms began on the twentieth day of October. It met in Dover, convening October 20, 1780, and was the third year of the administration of President Caesar Rodney.

The apportionment of seats was permanently assigned to three councilors and seven assemblymen for each of the three counties. Population of the county did not effect the number of delegates.

== Leadership ==
=== Legislative Council ===
- Thomas Collins, Kent County

=== House of Assembly ===
- Benjamin Caton, Kent County

== Members ==
=== Legislative Council ===
Councilors were elected by the public for a three-year term, one third posted each year.

New Castle County

- Richard Cantwell
- Peter Hyatt
- Thomas McDonough

Kent County

- John Banning
- Thomas Collins
- John Cook

Sussex County

- John Clowes
- William Conwell
- William Polk

=== House of Assembly ===
Assemblymen were elected by the public for a one-year term.

New Castle County

- William Clark
- Joshua Clayton
- Thomas Duff
- George Latimer
- Thomas Montgomery
- George Read
- Nicholas Van Dyke Sr.

Kent County

- Philip Barratt
- Richard Bassett
- Benjamin Caton
- John Clayton
- William Molleston
- Jacob Stout
- Thomas White

Sussex County

- John Collins
- Robert Houston
- Simon Kollock
- William Peery
- Burton Waples
- Nathaniel Young
- unknown

== Places with more information ==
- Delaware Historical Society; website; 505 North Market Street, Wilmington, Delaware 19801; (302) 655-7161.
- University of Delaware; Library website; 181 South College Avenue, Newark, Delaware 19717; (302) 831–2965.
