= 6th Delaware General Assembly =

American legislative session

←	5th	7th	→

Overview
- Legislative body: Delaware General Assembly
- Term: October 20, 1781 – October 20, 1782

The 6th Delaware General Assembly was a meeting of the legislative branch of the state government, consisting of the Delaware Legislative Council and the Delaware House of Assembly. Elections were held the first day of October and terms began on the twentieth day of October. The Assembly met in the state capital, Dover, convening October 20, 1781, in the administration of Delaware President John Dickinson.

The apportionment of seats was permanently assigned to three councilors and seven assemblymen for each of the three counties. Population of the county did not effect the number of delegates.

== Leadership ==
=== Legislative Council ===
- Thomas Collins, Kent County

=== House of Assembly ===
- Simon Kollock, Sussex County

== Members ==
=== Legislative Council ===
Councilors were elected by the public for a three-year term, one third posted each year.

New Castle County

- John Dickinson
  - Isaac Grantham
- Peter Hyatt
- Thomas McDonough

Kent County

- John Banning
- Thomas Collins
- John Cook

Sussex County

- William Conwell
- John Polk
- William Polk

=== House of Assembly ===
Assemblymen were elected by the public for a one-year term.

New Castle County

- Robert Bryan
- William Clark
- Joshua Clayton
- Thomas Duff
- George Latimer
- George Read
- Nicholas Van Dyke

Kent County

- Philip Barratt
- Richard Bassett
- Isaac Carty
- William Molleston
- Charles Ridgely
- Thomas Rodney
- Edward White

Sussex County

- George Adams
- John Collins
- David Hazzard
- Charles Polk Sr.
- Simon Kollock
- William Peery
- Nathaniel Waples

== Places with more information ==
- Delaware Historical Society; website; 505 North Market Street, Wilmington, Delaware 19801; (302) 655-7161.
- University of Delaware; Library website; 181 South College Avenue, Newark, Delaware 19717; (302) 831-2965.
