= 10th Delaware General Assembly =

American legislative session

←	9th	11th	→

Overview
- Legislative body: Delaware General Assembly
- Term: October 20, 1785 – October 20, 1786

The 10th Delaware General Assembly was a meeting of the legislative branch of the state government, consisting of the Delaware Legislative Council and the Delaware House of Assembly. Elections were held the first day of October and terms began on the twentieth day of October. It met in Dover, Delaware, convening October 20, 1785, and was the third year of the administration of President Nicholas Van Dyke Sr.

The apportionment of seats was permanently assigned to three councilors and seven assemblymen for each of the three counties. Population of the county did not effect the number of delegates.

== Leadership ==
=== Legislative Council ===
- Thomas McDonough, New Castle County

=== House of Assembly ===
- Thomas Duff, New Castle County

== Members ==
=== Legislative Council ===
Councilors were elected by the public for a three-year term, one third posted each year.

New Castle County

- George Craighead
- Thomas McDonough
- George Read

Kent County

- John Banning
- Silas Snow
- James Tilton

Sussex County

- Henry Neill
- Daniel Polk
- Joshua Polk

=== House of Assembly ===
Assemblymen were elected by the public for a one-year term.

New Castle County

- Gunning Bedford Sr.
- Jacob Broom
- John Clark
- Joshua Clayton
- Thomas Duff
- John Garrett
- Peter Hyatt

Kent County

- Jacob Emerson
- Mark McCall
- Allen McLane
- Charles Nixon
- John Patton
- James Raymond
- John Revell

Sussex County

- Nathaniel Hayes
- Israel Holland
- George Mitchell
- William Moore
- Charles Polk Sr.
- Rhodes Shankland
- John Tennent

== Places with more information ==
- Delaware Historical Society; website; 505 North Market Street, Wilmington, Delaware 19801; (302) 655-7161.
- University of Delaware; Library website; 181 South College Avenue, Newark, Delaware 19717; (302) 831-2965.
