= 7th Delaware General Assembly =

American legislative session

←	6th	8th	→

Overview
- Legislative body: Delaware General Assembly
- Term: October 20, 1782 – October 20, 1783

The 7th Delaware General Assembly was a meeting of the legislative branch of the state government, consisting of the Delaware Legislative Council and the Delaware House of Assembly. Elections were held the first day of October and terms began on the twentieth day of October. The Assembly met in the state capital, Dover, convening October 20, 1782, in the administration of Delaware President John Cook. He resigned by agreement and was replaced by President Nicholas Van Dyke, effective February 1, 1783.

The apportionment of seats was permanently assigned to three councilors and seven assemblymen for each of the three counties. Population of the county did not effect the number of delegates.

== Leadership ==
=== Legislative Council ===
- John Cook, Kent County

=== House of Assembly ===
- Nicholas Van Dyke, New Castle County
- Simon Kollock, Sussex County

== Members ==
=== Legislative Council ===
Councilors were elected by the public for a three-year term, one third posted each year.

New Castle County

- Isaac Grantham
- Thomas McDonough
- George Read

Kent County

- John Banning
- Richard Bassett
- John Cook

Sussex County

- John Collins
- Joshua Polk
- William Polk

=== House of Assembly ===
Assemblymen were elected by the public for a one-year term.

New Castle County

- Robert Bryan
- Thomas Duff
- Peter Hyatt
- John James
- Thomas Kean
- Samuel Smith
- Nicholas Van Dyke
  - Joshua Clayton

Kent County

- Philip Barratt
- Isaac Carty
- Jehu Davis
- John Gordon
- William Molleston
- Charles Ridgely
- Edward White

Sussex County

- John Collins
- William J. Hall
- David Hazzard
- Simon Kollock
- William Peery
- Charles Polk, Sr.
- Nathaniel Waples

== Places with more information ==
- Delaware Historical Society; website; 505 North Market Street, Wilmington, Delaware 19801; (302) 655-7161
- University of Delaware; Library website; 181 South College Avenue, Newark, Delaware 19717; (302) 831-2965
