= 9th Delaware General Assembly =

American legislative session

←	8th	10th	→

Overview
- Legislative body: Delaware General Assembly
- Term: October 20, 1784 – October 20, 1785

The 9th Delaware General Assembly was a meeting of the legislative branch of the state government, consisting of the Delaware Legislative Council and the Delaware House of Assembly. Elections were held the first day of October and terms began on the twentieth day of October. The Assembly met in the state capital, Dover, convening October 20, 1784, in the second year of the administration of Delaware President Nicholas Van Dyke Sr.

The apportionment of seats was permanently assigned to three councilors and seven assemblymen for each of the three counties. Population of the county did not effect the number of delegates.

== Leadership ==
=== Legislative Council ===
- Thomas McDonough, New Castle County

=== House of Assembly ===
- Thomas Duff, New Castle County

== Members ==
=== Legislative Council ===
Councilors were elected by the public for a three-year term, one third posted each year.

New Castle County

- George Craighead
- Thomas McDonough
- George Read

Kent County

- Richard Bassett
- Vincent Loockerman
- Silas Snow

Sussex County

- Henry Neill
- Joshua Polk
- William Polk

=== House of Assembly ===
Assemblymen were elected by the public for a one-year term.

New Castle County

- Gunning Bedford Sr.
- Jacob Broom
- William Clark
- Thomas Duff
- Peter Hyatt
- John James
- Samuel Smith

Kent County

- John Gordon
- Francis Many
- Charles Nixon
- James Raymond
- John Revell
- Jacob Stout
- Jenifer Taylor

Sussex County

- Isaac Bradley
- James Douglass
- Robert Houston
- Simon Kollock
- George Mitchell
- William Peery
- Nathaniel Waples

== Places with more information ==
- Delaware Historical Society; website; 505 North Market Street, Wilmington, Delaware 19801; (302) 655–7161.
- University of Delaware; Library website; 181 South College Avenue, Newark, Delaware 19717; (302) 831–2965.
