= Statue of Caesar Rodney =

Statue of Caesar Rodney can refer to:

- Statue of Caesar Rodney (U.S. Capitol)
- Equestrian statue of Caesar Rodney, Wilmington, Delaware
