= Nicholas Van Dyke =

Nicholas Van Dyke may refer to:

- Nicholas Van Dyke (politician, born 1738) (1738–1789), American lawyer and President of Delaware, father of the U.S. Senator
- Nicholas Van Dyke (politician, born 1769) (1770–1826), American lawyer and U.S. Senator from Delaware, son of the Governor
