= Swanwyck =

Historic house in Delaware, United States

- U.S. National Register of Historic Places
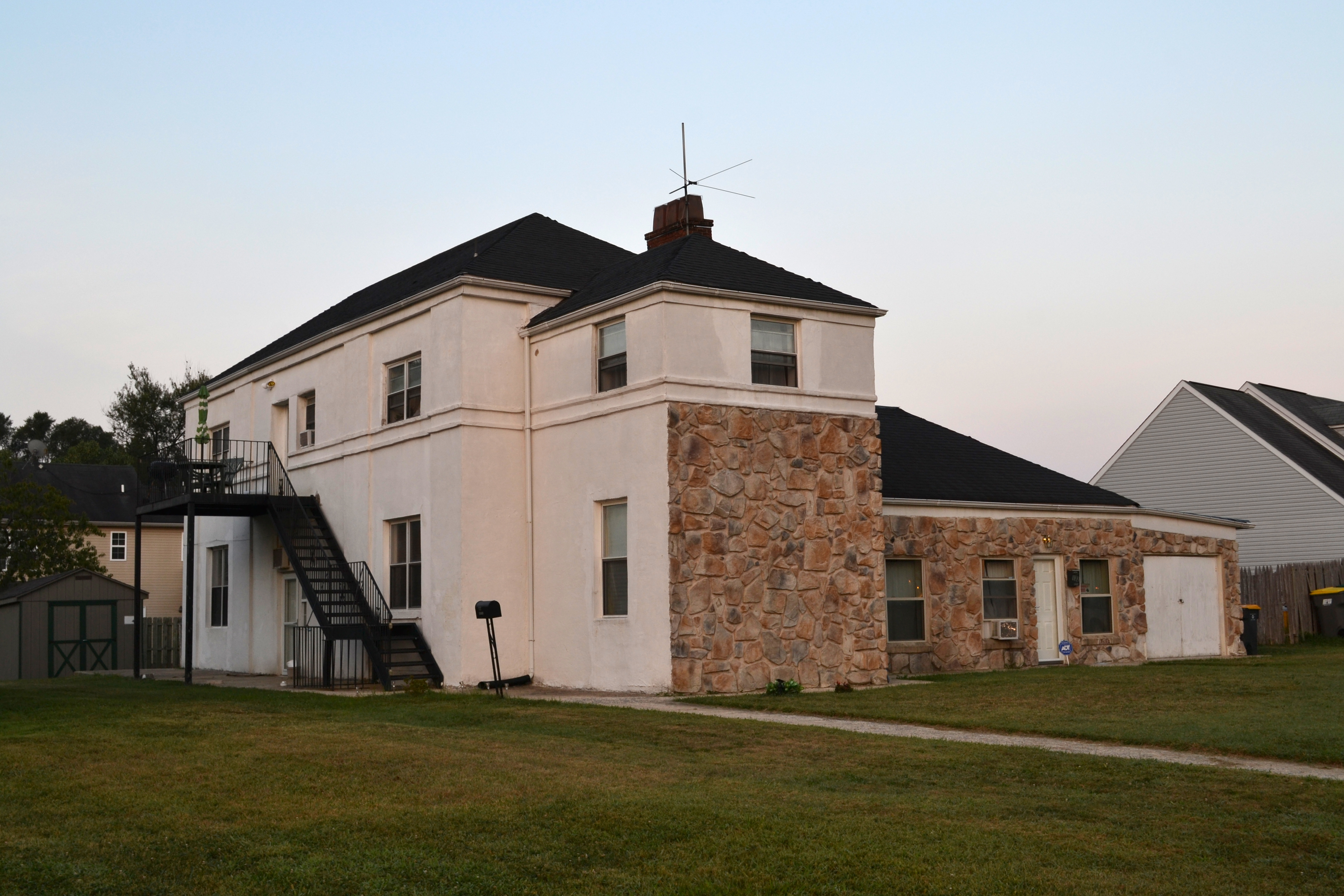
- Swanwyck, 2015

- Location within Delaware Location within the United States
- Location: 132 Linstone Ave., New Castle, Delaware
- Coordinates: 39.69193°N 75.56396°W
- Area: less than one acre
- Built: 1813-1819
- Architect: Peter Bauduy
- Architectural style: Regency
- NRHP reference No.: 77000387
- Added to NRHP: March 17, 1977

Swanwyck is a historic home located near New Castle in New Castle County, Delaware, United States. It was built between 1813 and 1819, and is a two-story, three-bay, stuccoed brick dwelling reflective of the Regency period. The house has been modified by later additions and is now surrounded by 20th century residential development, unlike its original farmland setting.

It was added to the National Register of Historic Places in 1977.

== History ==
Swanwyck was designed and built by Peter Bauduy for his daughter, Cora, sometime between 1813 and 1819. Bauduy was a French immigrant who came to Wilmington after fleeing first the French Revolution and then the Haitian Revolution. An associate of the Du Pont family, he was also credited as the architect of the Cathedral of Saint Peter in Wilmington. The name "Swanwyck" came from an old Dutch settlement located nearby on the Delaware River upriver from New Castle.

In the 1940s and 1950s, the farmland around Swanwyck was developed into a residential subdivision called Swanwyck Estates. An addition was built onto the northwest corner of the house around this time, including a new front entrance since the original building is now oriented sideways relative to the street.

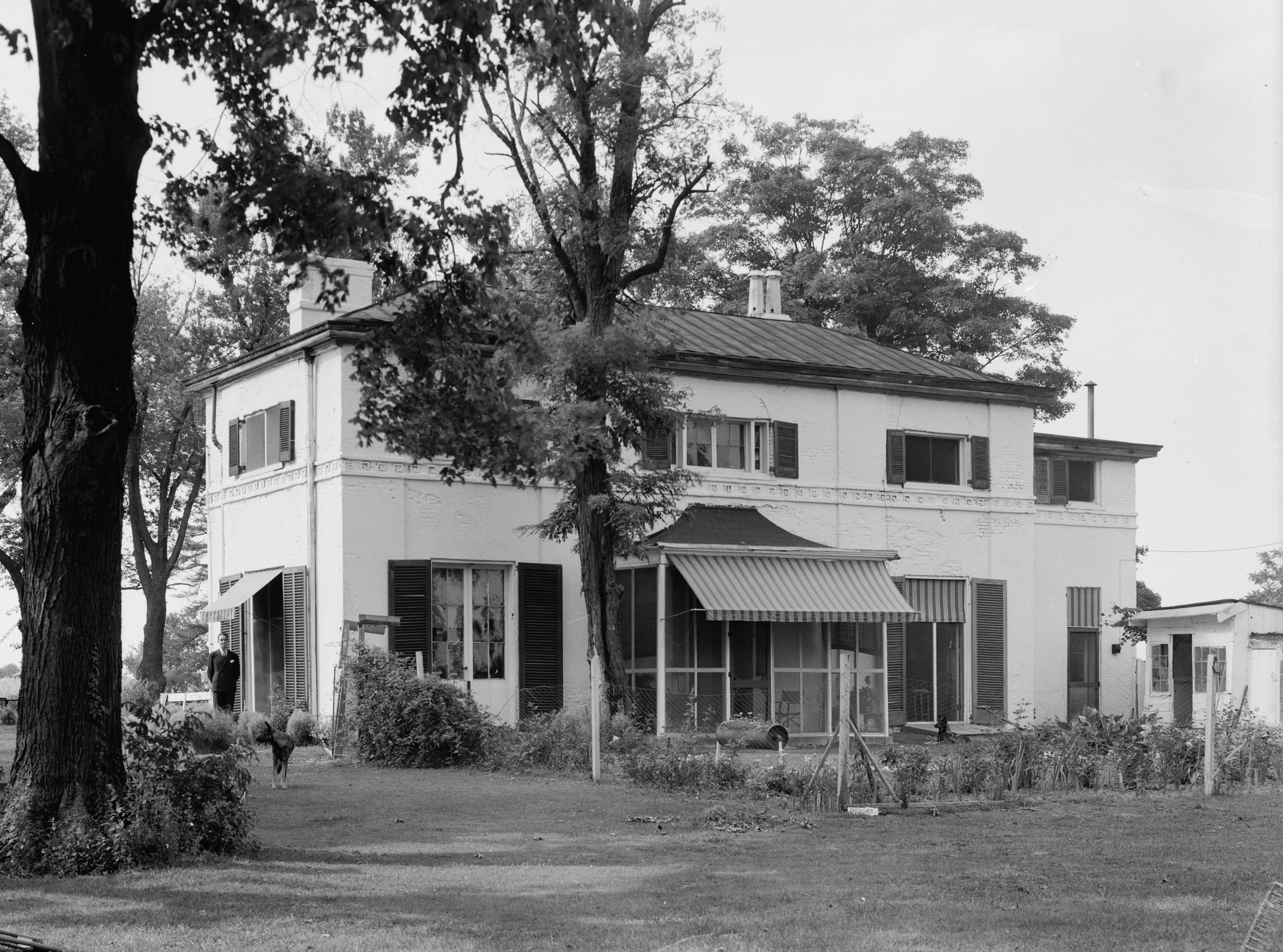
HABS photo from 1936 showing the earlier appearance of the house

== Architecture ==
Swanwyck is a two-story brick building exemplifying the British Regency style with a white stuccoed exterior and modest classical details. The main block of the house is three bays wide with subtly projecting piers and a hipped roof. The original facade has been modified by the removal of the central entrance portico and the addition of a separate second floor entrance accessed by exterior stairs. The main ornamentation consists of a prominent string course circling the entire building.

The original interior layout had three large rooms on each floor with a central hallway and staircase, but it has been considerably modified.
