= 1795 Delaware gubernatorial election =

- October 6, 1795
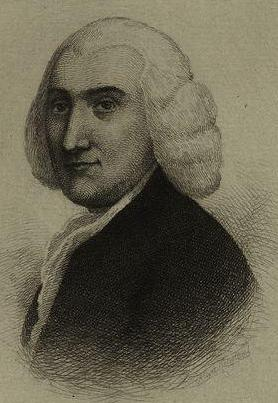

Nominee	Gunning Bedford Sr.	Archibald Alexander
Party	Federalist	Democratic-Republican
Popular vote	2,352	2,142
Percentage	52.34%	47.66%
- County results Bedford: 50–60% 60–70% Alexander: 50–60%
Governor before election
Joshua Clayton
Federalist
Elected Governor
Gunning Bedford Sr.
Federalist

The 1795 Delaware gubernatorial election was held on October 6, 1795. The Federalist former councilor Gunning Bedford Sr. defeated the Democratic-Republican senator from New Castle County Archibald Alexander.

The election was seen as a referendum on the Jay Treaty, which the Democratic-Republicans opposed. Alexander was listed as the "Anti-Treaty" candidate in the Aurora General Advertiser.

== General election ==
=== Results ===
1795 Delaware gubernatorial election
Party	Candidate	Votes	%	±%
Federalist	Gunning Bedford Sr.	2,352	52.34	▲3.99
Democratic-Republican	Archibald Alexander	2,142	47.66	▼3.99
Total votes		4,494	100.00	
Federalist hold				

=== Results by county ===
1795 Delaware gubernatorial election by county
County	Gunning Bedford Federalist		Archibald Alexander Democratic-Republican		Margin		Total
County	#	%	#	%	#	%	Total
Kent	779	51.6	731	48.4	48	3.2	1,510
New Castle	523	38.2	845	61.8	-322	-23.6	1,368
Sussex	1,050	65.0	566	35.0	484	30.0	1,616
TOTAL	2,352	52.3	2,142	47.7	210	4.6	4,494

== Bibliography ==
- Dubin, Michael J. (2003). United States Gubernatorial Elections, 1776-1860: The Official Results by State and County. Jefferson, NC: McFarland and Company. ISBN 978-0-7864-1439-0.
- Lampi, Philip J. (2012). "Delaware 1795 Governor". A New Nation Votes. American Antiquarian Society.
- Madison, James (October 18, 1795). "[Events in France, etc.]". Letter to Thomas Jefferson. Founders Online.
