= Archibald Alexander (politician) =

American politician

Dr. Alexander Archibald

Personal details
- Born: 1755 Virginia
- Died: September 12, 1822 (aged 67) New Castle County, Delaware
- Party: Democratic-Republican
- Profession: Physician

Archibald Alexander (1755 – September 12, 1822) was an American medical doctor and politician from New Castle County, Delaware, near the city of New Castle. He was a veteran of the American Revolution and a member of the Democratic-Republican Party who served in the Delaware General Assembly.

== Early life ==
Alexander was born in 1755 in Virginia into an Ulster-Scots family and moved to New Castle County, Delaware, when he was a small boy. He attended Newark Academy and studied medicine under Matthew Wilson. He was a member of the Presbyterian Church.

During the American Revolution, Alexander first served in the state militia but soon after joined the 10th Virginia Regiment of the Continental Army as a surgeon. After two years, he left the army to serve as a privateer out of Norfolk. Eventually his ship was captured and he was taken prisoner, serving out the remainder of the war in a prison ship in New York Harbor.

== Career ==
After the war, Alexander returned to New Castle County and practiced medicine. He was also active in the Democratic-Republican Party and was its first candidate for Governor of Delaware in 1795. He was able to carry heavily Presbyterian New Castle County, but lost the remainder of the state and the election to Federalist Gunning Bedford Sr. He later ran twice for Congress - for the at-large House seat in 1798, and in the 1802 special election for the U.S. Senate. A wealthy man, he was a supporter of banks and a founder of the Farmers' Bank of Delaware. He also led the effort to have a controversial bridge built over the Christiana River in Christiana, Delaware.

== Death ==
Alexander died on September 12, 1822, in New Castle County. He is buried at the Immanuel Episcopal Church cemetery.

== Public offices ==
Office	Type	Location	Elected	Took office	Left office	Notes
State Senator	Legislature	Dover	1791	October 20, 1791	January 7, 1794	
State Representative	Legislature	Dover	1794	January 6, 1795	January 5, 1796	
State Senator	Legislature	Dover	1796	January 3, 1797	January 2, 1798	
State Senator	Legislature	Dover	1797	January 2, 1798	January 6, 1801	
Prothonotary	Executive	New Castle		1801	1805	New Castle

=== Election results ===
Year	Office	Subject	Party	Votes	%	Opponent	Party	Votes	%
1795	Governor	Archibald Alexander	Democratic-Republican	2,142	48%	Gunning Bedford Sr.	Federalist	2,352	52%
1798	U.S. Representative	Archibald Alexander	Democratic-Republican	2,142	39%	James A. Bayard	Federalist	2,792	61%
1802	U.S. Senator	Archibald Alexander	Democratic-Republican	10	37%	Samuel White	Federalist	17	63%

Party political offices
Preceded by Thomas Montgomery	Democratic-Republican nominee for Governor of Delaware; 1795	Succeeded by David Hall
Political offices
Preceded by James Sykes	Governor of Delaware; 1802–1805	Succeeded by Nathaniel Mitchell
