= 1777 Delaware gubernatorial election =

- February 12, 1777
Nominee	John McKinly
Party	Nonpartisan
1st ballot	19
President before election
Office established
Elected President
John McKinly
Nonpartisan

The 1777 Delaware gubernatorial election was held on February 12, 1777. The president of the committee of safety John McKinly was elected president of Delaware for a term of three years.

McKinly, a physician and a militia officer from Wilmington, Delaware, was a political moderate chosen for his ability to appeal to all factions in the revolutionary government. His lack of distinction led critics to dismiss the incoming president as "a mere patch upon the back" of the powerful president of the Council George Read.

The election was conducted by the Delaware General Assembly. McKinly was elected with a majority on the first ballot.

== General election ==
1777 Delaware gubernatorial election
Candidate	First ballot	
Candidate	Count	Percent
John McKinly	19	82.61
Others	4	17.39
Total	23	100.00

== Bibliography ==
- Delaware (1887). Minutes of the Council of the Delaware State, from 1776 to 1792. Wilmington: Historical Society of Delaware.
- Munroe, John A. (1954). Federalist Delaware, 1775–1815. New Brunswick: Rutgers University Press.
