= Statue of Christopher Columbus (Wilmington, Delaware) =

Statue of Christopher Columbus, formerly installed in Wilmington, Delaware, U.S.

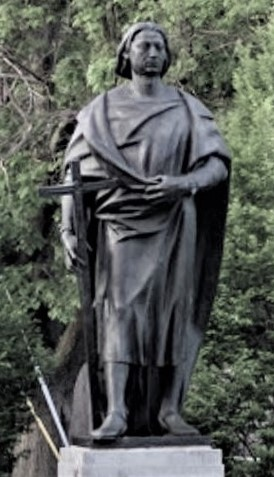
- The statue
- Artist: Egidio Giaroli
- Medium: Bronze sculpture; granite (base)
- Subject: Christopher Columbus
- Dimensions: 3.7 m (12 ft)
- Location: Wilmington, Delaware, U.S.; 39°45′12″N 75°33′31″W

A statue of Christopher Columbus was installed in Wilmington, Delaware, United States. It was produced by the sculptor Egidio Giaroli in Rome, and was cast and molded in the Italian city of Pistoia. The statue was unveiled on October 12, 1957, and was removed in June 2020, its status and future currently is unclear, and its impromptu removal controversial and the subject of political debate.

== Description ==
The statue is made of bronze and weighs 1,600 pounds (730 kg) and is twelve feet (3.7 m) high with a granite base.

== History ==
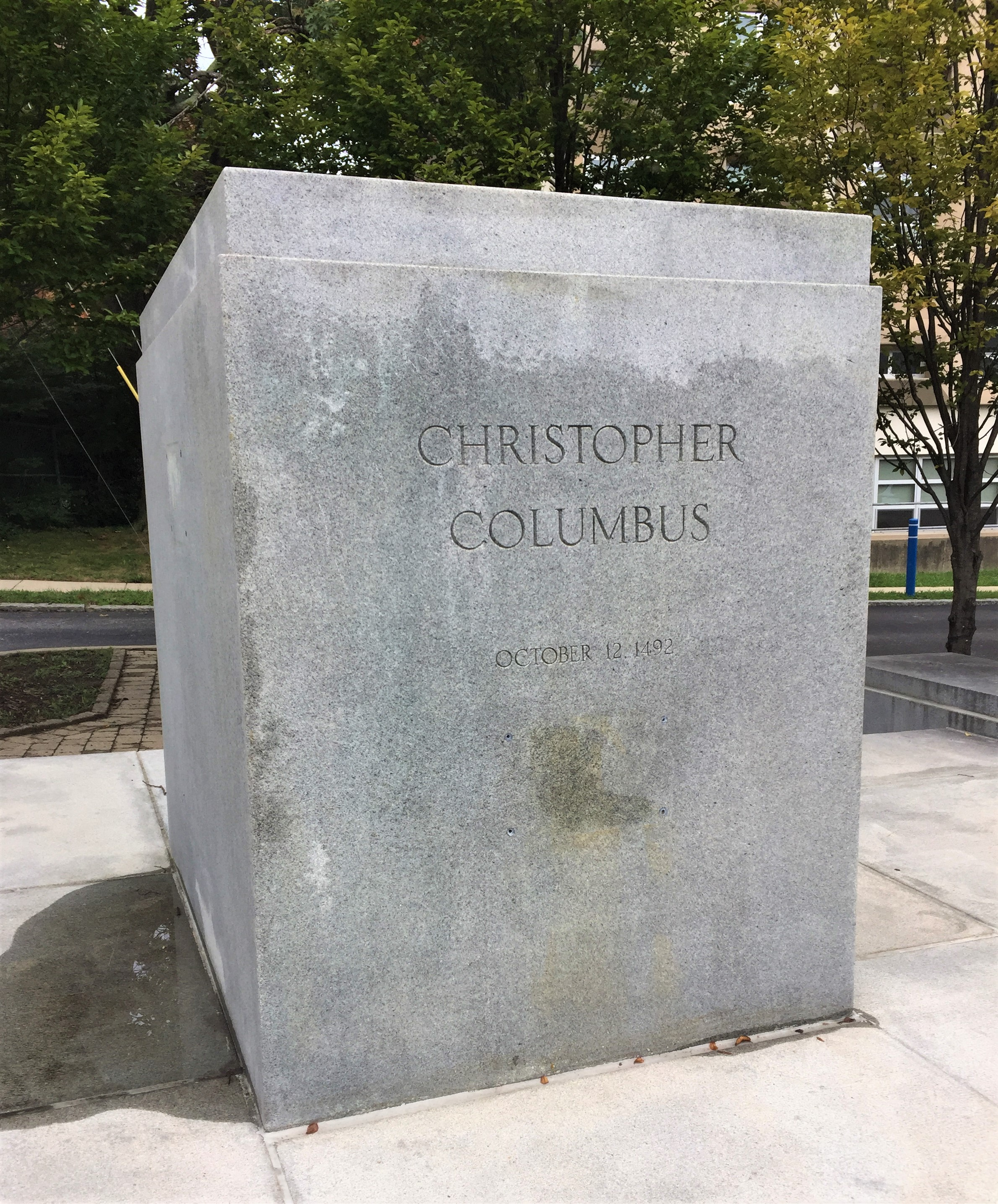
Pedestal after the statue was removed for safe keeping

The statue was created as a project through the city of Wilmington and was endorsed by the Sons of Italy, and the Knights of Columbus, with about $40,000 raised through donations. The committee to create the statue was led by Reverend Roberto Balducelli, a pastor of St. Anthony of Padua Catholic Church.

It was removed from public display on June 12, 2020, along with the equestrian statue of Caesar Rodney in Wilmington, during the protests that followed the murder of George Floyd. Both statues were quickly removed after a statue honoring law enforcement had been vandalized and destroyed with urine-soaked Delaware state flags nearby.

== See also ==
- List of monuments and memorials to Christopher Columbus
- List of monuments and memorials removed during the George Floyd protests
- Equestrian statue of Caesar Rodney, also removed in June 2020
