= Equestrian statue of Caesar Rodney =

Statue of Caesar Rodney in Washington, D.C.

Statue of Caesar Rodney
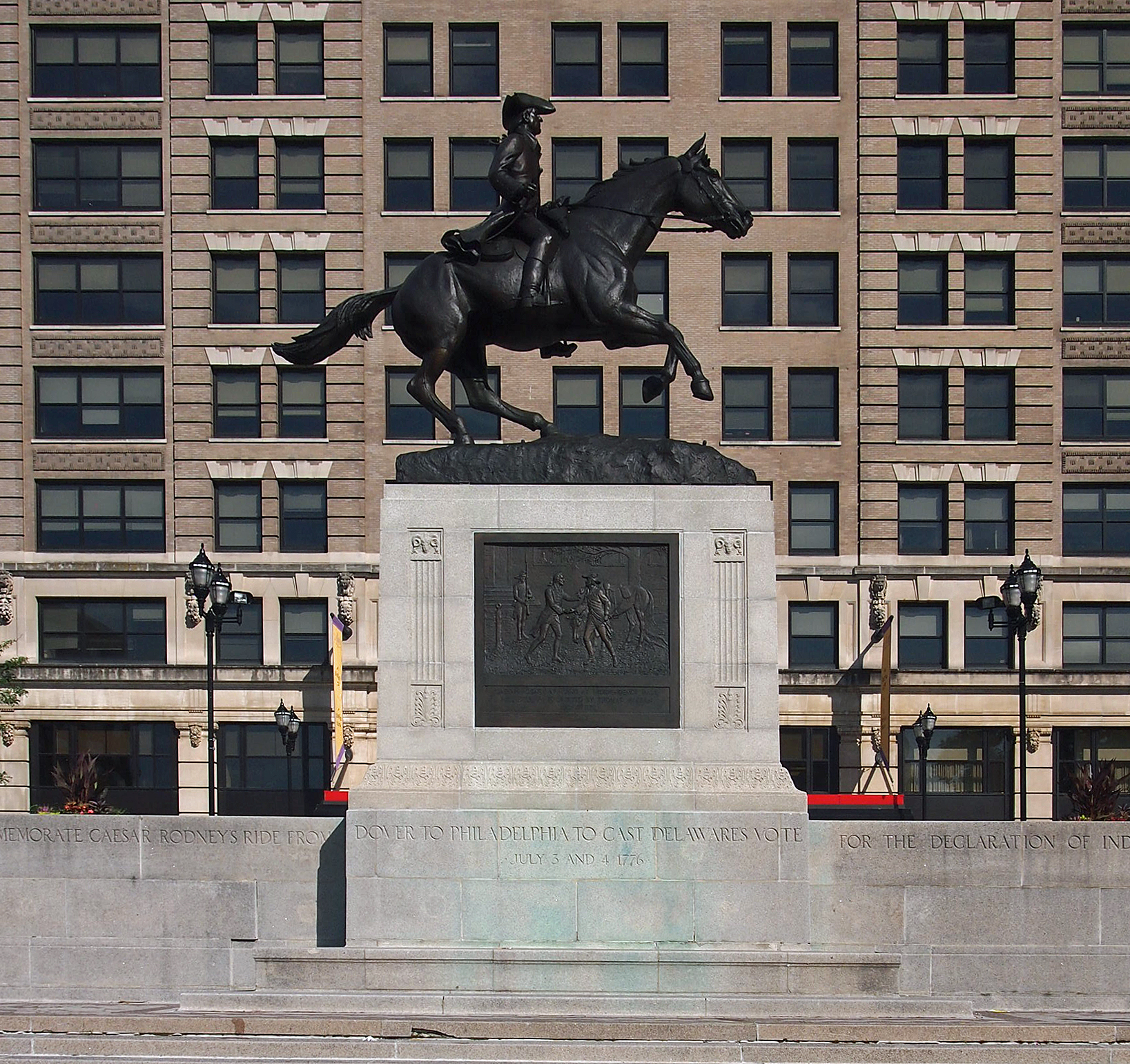
- The statue in 2016
- Artist: James E. Kelly
- Year: 1923
- Subject: Caesar Rodney
- Location: Wilmington, Delaware, U.S.; 39.74595°N 75.54730°W

A statue of Founding Father Caesar Rodney, in Freedom Plaza in Washington, D.C., was initially installed in Wilmington, Delaware, in Rodney Square on July 4, 1923. It was designed by New York sculptor James Edward Kelly. The Gorham Company in Rhode Island cast the statue and its two bronze plaques. The statue was removed from public view during the George Floyd protests in 2020. In May 2026, the statue was relocated to Freedom Plaza.

== Description ==
Bronze plaques are affixed to the northwest and southeast sides of the statue's pedestal. One depicts Thomas McKean greeting Rodney in Philadelphia; the other, Rodney casting the deciding vote of the Lee Resolution in favor of American independence. On top of the pedestal Rodney sits astride his horse, which is in full gallop with its front feet in the air, the majority of the statue's weight on the horse's hind legs. To balance the statue, Kelly heavily weighted the horse's tail and positioned Rodney upright and toward the rear of the horse.

== History ==
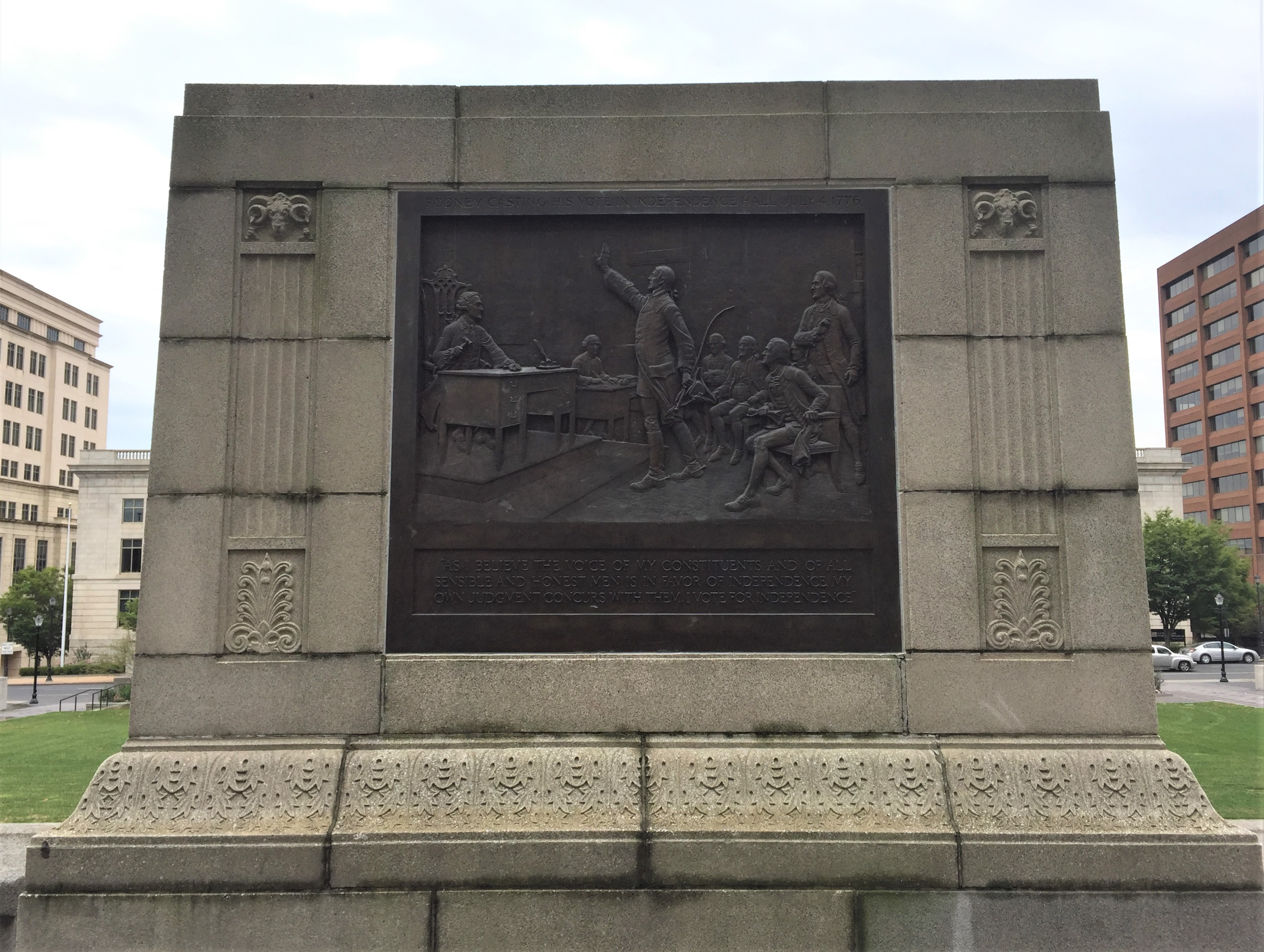
Pedestal after the statue was removed for safe keeping

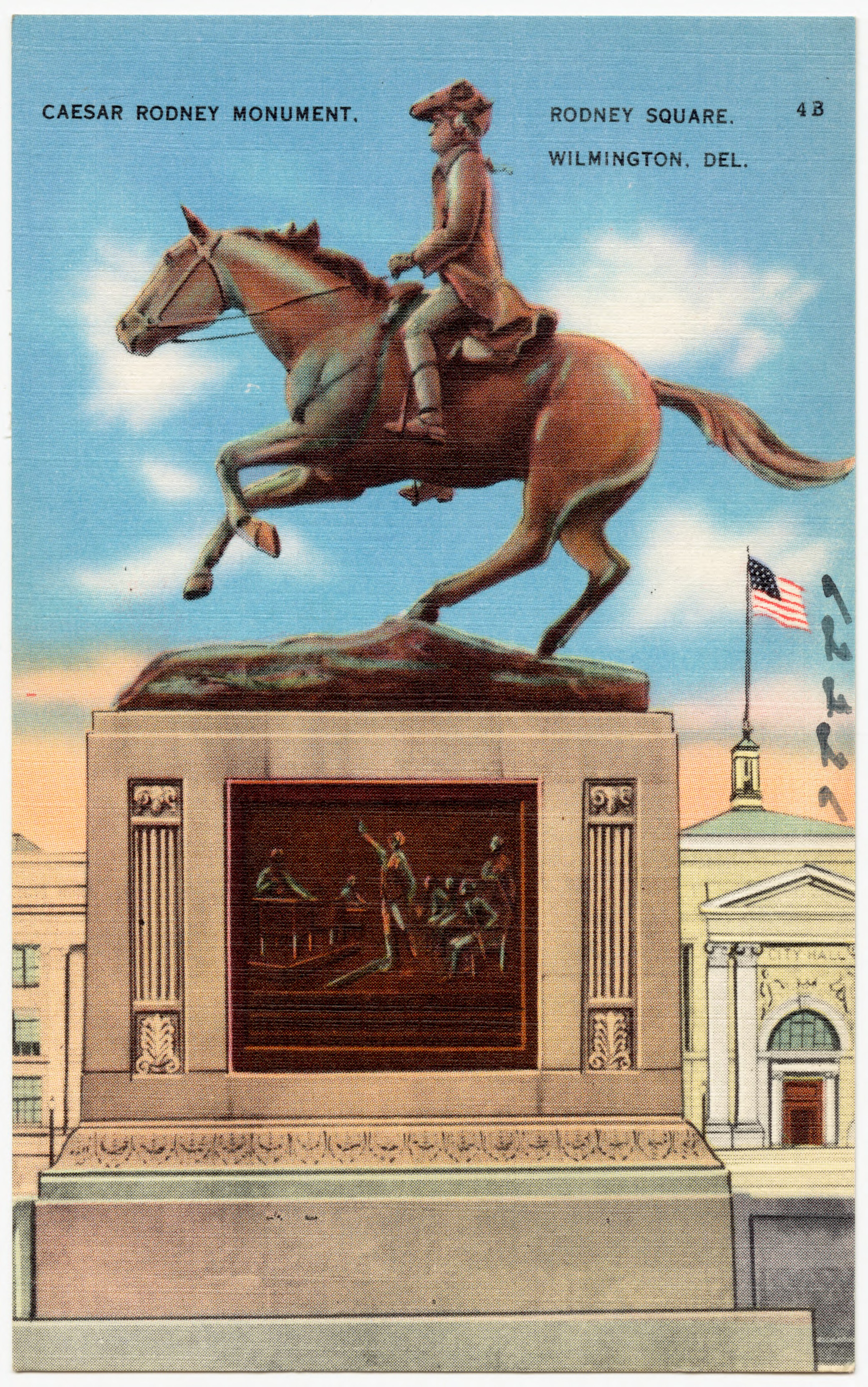
Postcard of the statue

Funds for the statue were raised by the Caesar Rodney Equestrian Statue Executive Committee to commemorate the ride of Rodney from Kent County, Delaware to Independence Hall in Philadelphia on July 1 and 2, 1776.

The statue was unveiled in Rodney Square in Wilmington, Delaware on July 4, 1923.

It was removed from public display on June 12, 2020, along with the statue of Christopher Columbus in Wilmington, Delaware in the wake of the protests following the murder of George Floyd. Both statues were temporarily removed after a Dover, Delaware statue honoring law enforcement was vandalized with an axe and urine-soaked Delaware state flags. The cost of removal was $33,561.80 and the statue was placed in a private storage facility in Swedesboro, NJ, at a cost of $100 per month.

Internal Interior Department documents made public in February 2026 stated that the Trump administration sought to give the sculpture a "position of honor" in Washington, DC, at least temporarily in Freedom Plaza, as part of the nation’s 250th birthday.

The statue was placed in Freedom Plaza in May 2026, surrounded by twelve other statues of Revolutionary War leaders.

== See also ==
- Statue of Caesar Rodney (U.S. Capitol)
- List of monuments and memorials removed during the George Floyd protests
- Statue of Christopher Columbus (Wilmington, Delaware), also removed in June 2020
