= Amstel House =

Historic house in Delaware, US

- U.S. National Register of Historic Places
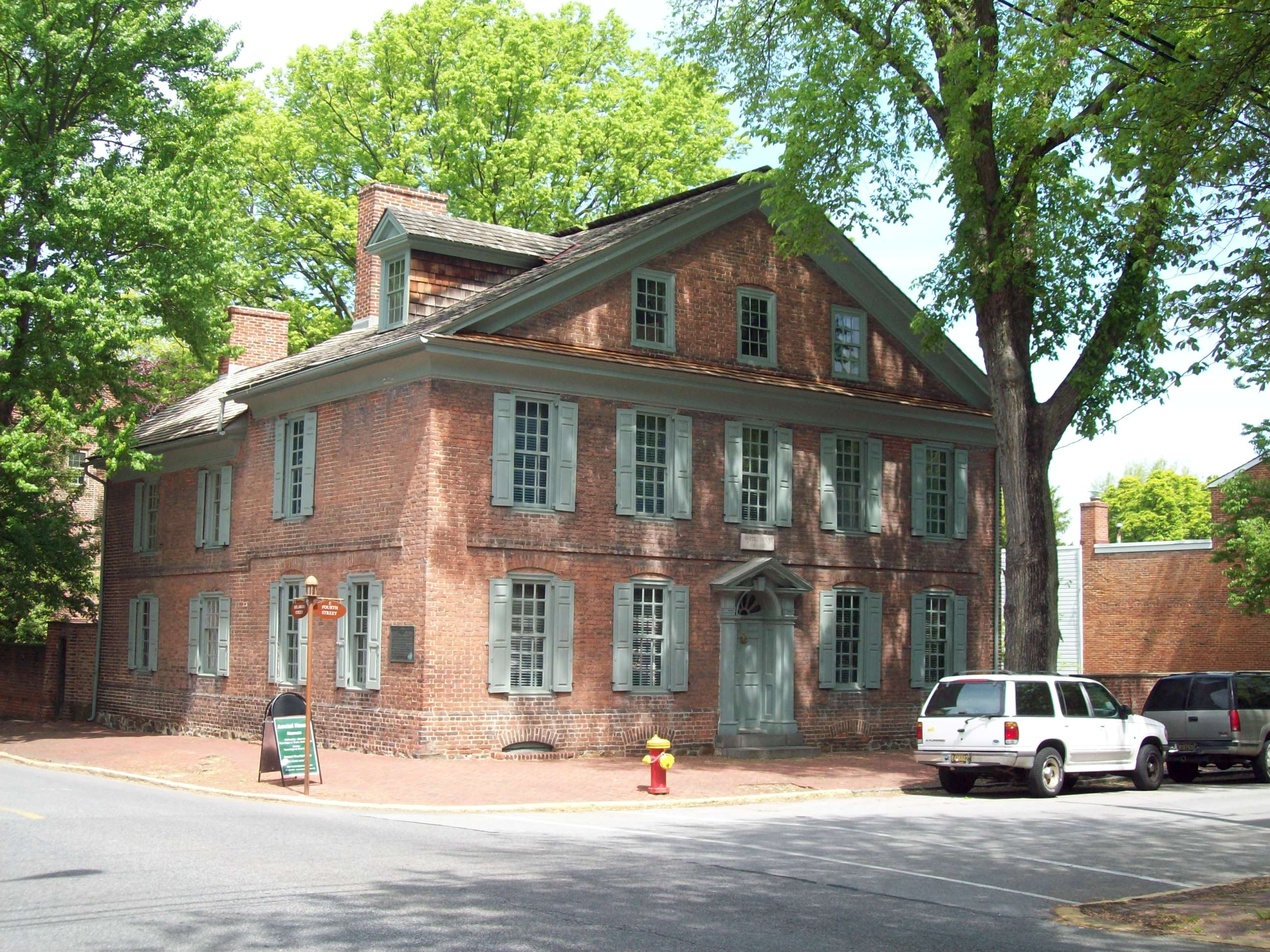
- Amstel House, May 2010

- Location within Delaware Location within the United States
- Location: 2 E 4th St., New Castle, Delaware
- Coordinates: 39.660610°N 75.564853°W
- Area: 0.5 acres (0.20 ha)
- NRHP reference No.: 77000386
- Added to NRHP: May 12, 1977

Amstel House, also known as Dr. Finney House, is a preserved building in New Castle, Delaware, United States, built in the 1730s. The decline of New Castle in the 19th century meant that many owners of homes could no longer afford to make changes to them, which is why so many buildings were preserved. That changed, however, when New Castle was "rediscovered" during the Colonial Revival phase of the 1920s and 1930s and old buildings began to be torn down and replaced by new construction.

In 1931, to protect New Castle's heritage, a group of concerned citizens raised funds to buy the Amstel House, which faced an uncertain fate. This was the town's first formal preservation effort. Shortly thereafter the group evolved into the New Castle Historical Society which, in the 75 years that have followed, has worked closely with the city and other civic organizations to save, preserve and restore many of the town's historic architectural treasures.

It was listed on the National Register of Historic Places in 1977.
