= Jehu Davis =

American politician

John (Jehu) Davis

9th President of Delaware
- In office March 29, 1789 – June 2, 1789
- Preceded by: Thomas Collins
- Succeeded by: Joshua Clayton

Personal details
- Born: 1738 Worcester County, Province of Maryland
- Died: May 11, 1802 (aged 63–64) Kent County, Delaware, US
- Spouse(s): Rhoda Laws; Sarah Douglas
- Occupation: Planter

John (Jehu) Davis (1738 – May 11, 1802) was an American planter and politician from Mispillion Hundred, in Kent County, Delaware, west of Milford. He served in the Delaware General Assembly and as President of Delaware.

== Early life and family ==
Davis was born in Worcester County, Maryland, son of Thomas Davis. His paternal grandfather was born in Wales. Jehu Davis came to Laurel, Delaware where he married Rhoda Laws. After their marriage they bought McSparren, a farm in Mispillion Hundred, 3 miles west of Milford, where they settled permanently. There they had eight children, Isaac, John, Henry, Sarah, Rhoda, Nancy, Joshua, and William. After Rhoda's death, Davis married Sarah Douglas. They were members of Christ Episcopal Church in Milford. That portion of Mispillion Hundred became Milford Hundred in 1830.

== Professional and political career ==
Davis was a member of the local militia during the American Revolution and a justice of the peace for 14 years beginning in 1777. He was elected to the 1st State House, or House of Assembly, and served ten terms from the 1776/77 session through the 1779/80 session, again in the 1782/83 and 1783/84 sessions, and finally from the 1786/87 session through the 1789/90 session. He was the Speaker in the 1788/89 session and when President Thomas Collins died in office on March 29, 1789, the Speaker's office in the State Senate or Legislative Council, was vacant. Consequently, Davis became president. He served until June 2, 1789, when the Delaware General Assembly held a special vote to choose Collins' replacement.

During Davis' short term George Washington was inaugurated the first President of the United States. The event of his passing through Wilmington on the way to New York for this ceremony caused a great deal of excitement, as described by Elizabeth Montgomery in her Reminiscences of Wilmington:

and it must have been soon after his elevation to that office, for I well remember the crowds of people rushing onto the Baltimore Road (now Maryland Avenue) to catch a glimpse as he passed...It was a day of great enjoyment, all was on tiptoe of expectation when his chariot appeared, driving slowly through the crowd, he bowing, hat in hand, and white handkerchief waving, and every face flushed, and sparkling with joy.

Afterwards, Davis served as a judge of the Court of Common Pleas from 1789 until 1792 and as a justice of the peace from 1793 until his death.

Delaware General Assembly (sessions while President)
Year	Assembly	Senate majority	Speaker	House majority	Speaker
1788/89	13th	non-partisan	George Mitchell	non-partisan	vacant

== Death and legacy ==
Davis died at McSparren, in Mispillion Hundred and is buried in the Christ (Savannah) Episcopal Church Cemetery. The cemetery is now paved over by Delaware Route 14. A man from Wales who came to America paved the road for the all-time greatest American Family.

No known portrait of Jehu Davis exists.

== Almanac ==
Elections were held October 1 and members of the General Assembly took office on October 20 or the following weekday. State Assemblymen had a one-year term. The whole General Assembly chose the State President for a three-year term. However, Davis served as State President only temporarily, filling the vacancy created by the death of Thomas Collins and awaiting the selection of a successor by the General Assembly. Judges of the Courts of Common Pleas were also selected by the General Assembly for the life of the person appointed.

Public offices
Office	Type	Location	Began office	Ended office	Notes
Judge	Judiciary	Dover	1777	1789	Justice of the Peace
Assemblyman	Legislature	New Castle	October 28, 1776	October 20, 1777	
Assemblyman	Legislature	Dover	October 20, 1777	October 20, 1778	
Assemblyman	Legislature	Dover	October 20, 1778	October 20, 1779	
Assemblyman	Legislature	Dover	October 20, 1779	October 20, 1780	
Assemblyman	Legislature	Dover	October 21, 1782	October 20, 1783	
Assemblyman	Legislature	Dover	October 20, 1783	October 21, 1784	
Assemblyman	Legislature	Dover	October 20, 1786	October 21, 1787	
Assemblyman	Legislature	Dover	October 20, 1787	October 26, 1788	
Assemblyman	Legislature	Dover	October 20, 1788	October 20, 1789	
State President	Executive	Dover	March 29, 1789	June 2, 1789	acting
Assemblyman	Legislature	Dover	October 20, 1789	October 20, 1790	
Judge	Judiciary	Dover	1789	1792	Court of Common Pleas
Judge	Judiciary	Dover	1793	1802	Justice of the Peace

Delaware General Assembly service
Dates	Assembly	Chamber	Majority	Governor	Committees	District
1776/77	1st	State House	non-partisan	John McKinly		Kent at-large
1777/78	2nd	State House	non-partisan	George Read		Kent at-large
1778/79	3rd	State House	non-partisan	Caesar Rodney		Kent at-large
1779/80	4th	State House	non-partisan	Caesar Rodney		Kent at-large
1782/83	7th	State House	non-partisan	John Cook		Kent at-large
1783/84	8th	State House	non-partisan	Nicholas Van Dyke		Kent at-large
1786/87	11th	State House	non-partisan	Thomas Collins		Kent at-large
1787/88	12th	State House	non-partisan	Thomas Collins		Kent at-large
1788/89	13th	State House	non-partisan	Thomas Collins	Speaker	Kent at-large
1789/90	14th	State House	non-partisan	Joshua Clayton	Speaker	Kent at-large

== Places with more information ==
- Delaware Historical Society; website; 505 North Market Street, Wilmington, Delaware 19801; (302) 655-7161.
- University of Delaware; Library website; 181 South College Avenue, Newark, Delaware 19717; (302) 831-2965.

Political offices
Preceded by Thomas Collins	President of Delaware; 1789	Succeeded by Joshua Clayton
