= Statue of Caesar Rodney (U.S. Capitol) =

Sculpture by Bryant Baker

Caesar Rodney
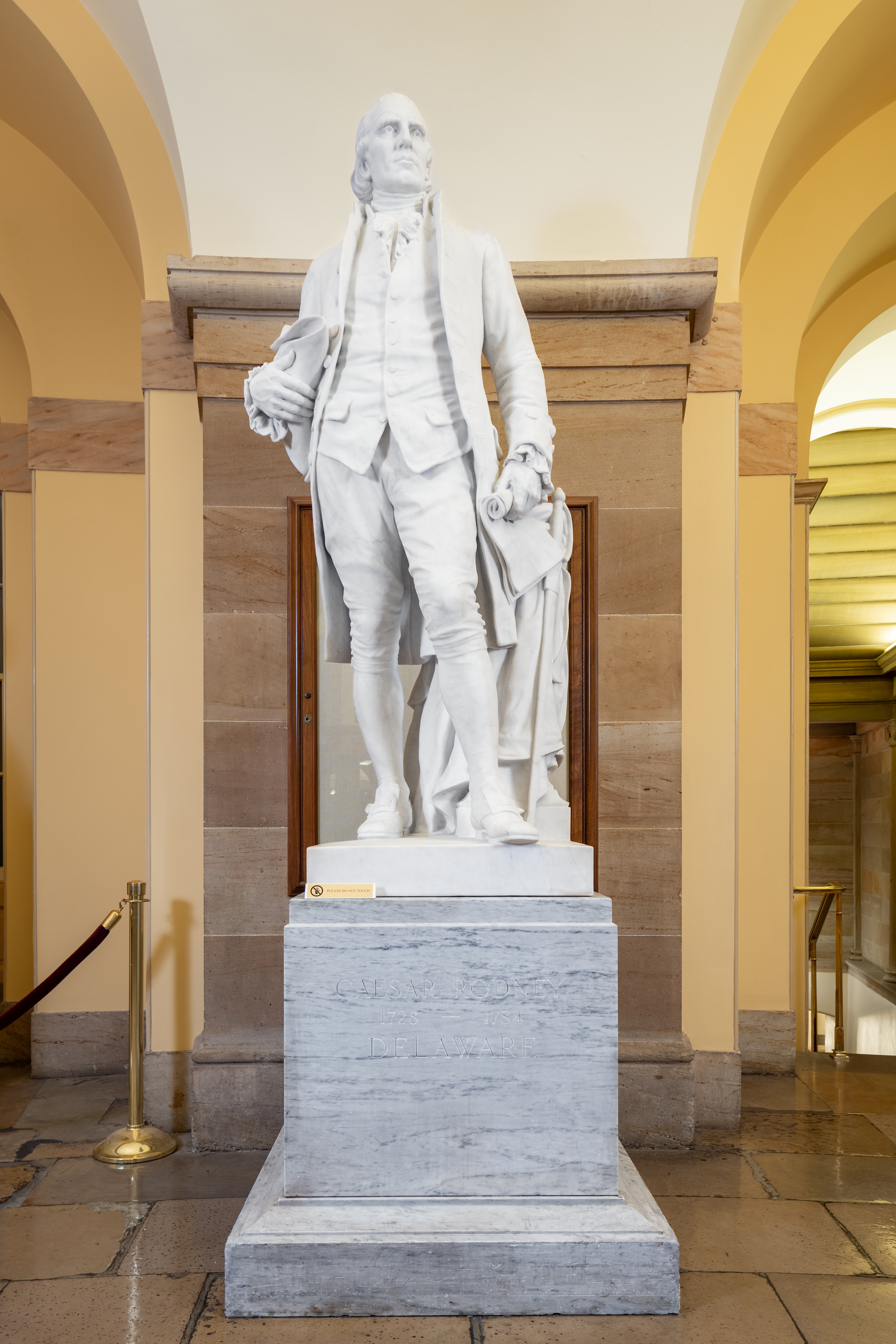
- The statue at the U.S. Capitol crypt in 2022
- Medium: Marble sculpture
- Subject: Caesar Rodney
- Location: Washington, D.C., United States

Caesar Rodney is a marble sculpture of the American Founding Father, lawyer and politician of the same name by Bryant Baker, installed in the United States Capitol's crypt, in Washington, D.C., as part of the National Statuary Hall Collection. The statue was gifted by the U.S. state of Delaware in 1934.

== See also ==
- Equestrian statue of Caesar Rodney (Washington. D.C.)
