= Duck Creek Village (Smyrna, Delaware) =

- U.S. National Register of Historic Places
- U.S. Historic district
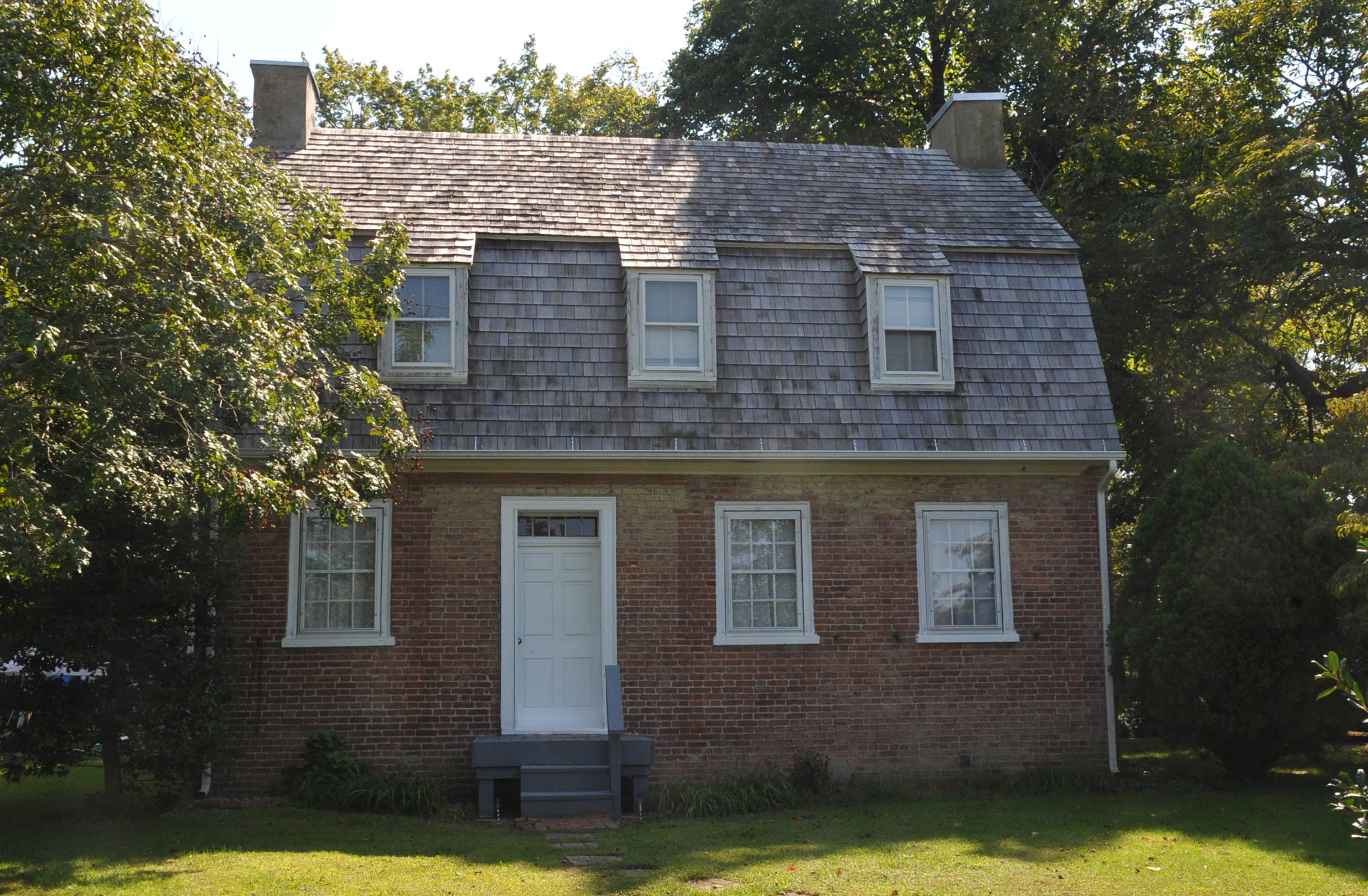
- "The Lindens," Duck Creek Village, September 2012

- Location within Delaware Location within the United States
- Location: Road 65 between Duck Creek and Green's Branch, Smyrna, Delaware
- Coordinates: 39°18′28″N 75°37′15″W
- Area: 34.3 acres (13.9 ha)
- Built: 1872
- NRHP reference No.: 72000282
- Added to NRHP: February 1, 1972

Duck Creek Village, also known as Salisbury, is a national historic district located at Smyrna, Kent County, Delaware. It encompasses three contributing buildings that are the remnants of a mid-18th century community. They are the two-story, five-bay, brick former miller's house known as "The Lindens;" a one-story, plank house with a steep gable roof; and a former grist mill measuring 80 feet by 100 feet. In 1998 and 1999, the Duck Creek Historical Society disassembled and moved the plank house to the rear yard of the Smyrna Museum Complex.

It was listed on the National Register of Historic Places in 1972.
