= Gunning Bedford Sr. =

American lawyer and politician

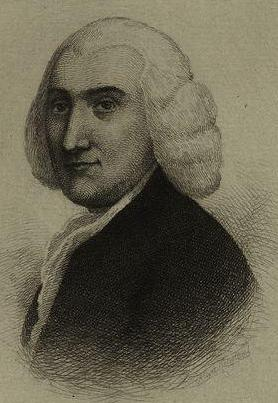

11th Governor of Delaware
- In office January 19, 1796 – September 30, 1797
- Preceded by: Joshua Clayton
- Succeeded by: Daniel Rogers

Personal details
- Born: April 7, 1742 New Castle County, Delaware Colony
- Died: September 30, 1797 (aged 55) New Castle, Delaware
- Party: Federalist
- Spouse: Mary Read
- Profession: Lawyer

Military service
- Allegiance: United States
- Branch/service: New Castle County Militia; Continental Army
- Rank: Lieutenant Colonel
- Battles/wars: French and Indian War; American Revolutionary War

Gunning Bedford Sr. (April 7, 1742 – September 30, 1797) was an American lawyer and politician from New Castle, in New Castle County, Delaware. He was an officer in the Continental Army during the American Revolution, and a member of the Federalist Party, who served in the Delaware General Assembly and as Governor of Delaware. He is often confused with his cousin, Gunning Bedford Jr., who was a delegate to the U.S. Constitutional Convention of 1787.

== Early life and family ==
Bedford was born on a farm in New Castle Hundred, near the town of New Castle, son of William and Catherine Jacquett Bedford. William Bedford was the grandson of another William Bedford who came to Delaware from Virginia around 1680, and who himself was the grandson of an English immigrant to Jamestown, Virginia, in 1621. Gunning Bedford was educated at the Academy of Pennsylvania and married Mary Read, the sister of George Read in 1769. They had no children. They lived at 6 The Strand in New Castle and were members of Immanuel Episcopal Church. He began his career as a merchant at New Castle, but later studied law, and was admitted to the Delaware Bar in 1779.

== Political career ==
Bedford was elected to four terms in the House of Assembly beginning with the 1783–84 session and serving through the 1786–87 session. He was elected a delegate to the U.S. Congress under the Articles of Confederation in 1786–87, but resigned shortly afterwards on January 15, 1787. He then was elected to a term on the Legislative Council beginning with the 1788–89 session. In October 1795 he was the Federalist candidate for governor, defeating Dr. Archibald Alexander, a retired army surgeon. He served as governor from January 19, 1796, until his death on September 30, 1797.

== Death and legacy ==
Bedford died at New Castle and is buried there in the Immanuel Episcopal Church Cemetery. He was the second Governor of Delaware to die in office.

Delaware General Assembly (sessions while Governor)
Year	Assembly	Senate majority	Speaker	House majority	Speaker
1796	20th	Federalist	Daniel Rogers	Federalist	Stephen Lewis
1797	21st	Federalist	Daniel Rogers	Federalist	Stephen Lewis

== Almanac ==
Elections were held October 1, and members of the General Assembly took office on October 20 or the following weekday. State legislative councilors had a three-year term, and state assemblymen had a one-year term.

Beginning in 1792 elections were held on the first Tuesday of October, and members of the General Assembly took office the first Tuesday of January. Also in 1792 the State Legislative Council was renamed the State Senate, and the State House of Assembly became the State House of Representatives. The State President became the governor and was popularly elected. He takes office the third Tuesday in January and had a three-year term.

Public offices
Office	Type	Location	Began office	Ended office	Notes
Assemblyman	Legislature	Dover	October 20, 1783	October 20, 1784	
Assemblyman	Legislature	Dover	October 20, 1784	October 20, 1785	
Assemblyman	Legislature	Dover	October 20, 1785	October 21, 1786	
Assemblyman	Legislature	Dover	October 20, 1786	October 21, 1787	
Councilman	Legislature	Dover	October 20, 1788	October 26, 1791	
Governor	Executive	Dover	January 19, 1796	September 28, 1797	

Delaware General Assembly service
Dates	Assembly	Chamber	Majority	Governor	Committees	District
1783/84	8th	State House	non-partisan	Nicholas Van Dyke		New Castle at-large
1784/85	9th	State House	non-partisan	Nicholas Van Dyke		New Castle at-large
1785/86	10th	State House	non-partisan	Nicholas Van Dyke		New Castle at-large
1786/87	11th	State House	non-partisan	Thomas Collins		New Castle at-large
1788/89	13th	State Council	non-partisan	Thomas Collins		New Castle at-large
1789/90	14th	State Council	non-partisan	Joshua Clayton		New Castle at-large
1790/91	15th	State Council	non-partisan	Joshua Clayton		New Castle at-large

Election results
Year	Office	Subject	Party	Votes	%	Opponent	Party	Votes	%
1795	Governor	Gunning Bedford Sr.	Federalist	2,352	52%	Archibald Alexander	Republican	2,142	48%

== Places with more information ==
- Delaware Historical Society; website; 505 North Market Street, Wilmington, Delaware 19801; (302) 655-7161.
- University of Delaware; Library website; 181 South College Avenue, Newark, Delaware 19717; (302) 831-2965.

Party political offices
Preceded by Joshua Clayton	Federalist nominee for Governor of Delaware; 1795	Succeeded by Richard Bassett
Political offices
Preceded by Joshua Clayton	Governor of Delaware; 1796–1797	Succeeded by Daniel Rogers
