= Caesar Rodney =

U.S. Founding Father (1728–1784)

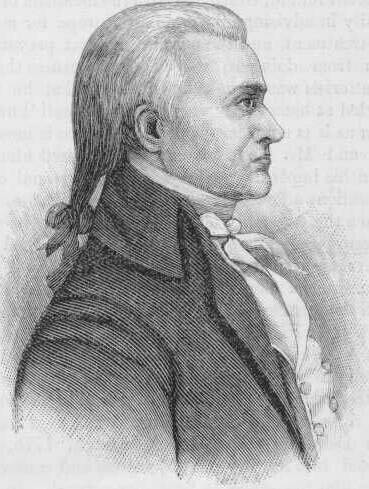
- 20th-century image; no contemporary portrait exists.

4th President of Delaware
- In office March 31, 1778 – November 6, 1781
- Preceded by: George Read
- Succeeded by: John Dickinson

Continental Congressman from Delaware
- In office August 2, 1774 – November 7, 1776

Personal details
- Born: October 7, 1728 Kent County, Delaware Colony, British America
- Died: June 26, 1784 (aged 55) Kent County, Delaware, U.S.
- Resting place: Kent County, Delaware, U.S.
- Party: Independent
- Profession: Politician; lawyer

Military service
- Branch/service: Delaware Militia
- Rank: Major General
- Battles/wars: American Revolutionary War; 1780 Black Camp Rebellion

Caesar Rodney (October 7, 1728 – June 26, 1784) was an American Founding Father, lawyer, and politician from St. Jones Neck in Dover Hundred, Kent County, Delaware. He was an officer of the Delaware militia during the French and Indian War and the American Revolutionary War, a Continental Congressman from Delaware, a signer of the Continental Association and Declaration of Independence, and president of Delaware during most of the American Revolution.

== Rodney family and early years ==
The Coat of Arms of Caesar Rodney

Rodney was born on October 7, 1728, on his family's plantation, "Byfield", on St. Jones Neck in East Dover Hundred, Kent County, Delaware. Caesar was the eldest son of 2 children of Caesar and Elizabeth Crawford Rodney and grandson of William Rodney. William Rodney emigrated to the American colonies in 1681–1682, along with William Penn, and was speaker of the Colonial Assembly of the Delaware Counties in 1704.

Rodney's mother was the daughter of the Rev. Thomas Crawford, Anglican rector of Christ Church at Dover. Among the Rodney family ancestors were the prominent Adelmare family in Treviso, Italy, as attested by genealogy studies.

Byfield was an 849 acres (344 ha) farm worked by enslaved labor. The Rodneys were, by the standards of the day, prosperous members of the local gentry. The farm earned sufficient income from the sale of wheat and barley to the Philadelphia and West Indies markets to provide enough cash and leisure to allow members of the family to participate in the social and political life of Kent County. At Rodney's death, he held 18 enslaved people. His will manumitted three of advanced age upon his death, and held the others to a manumission schedule he devised.

Caesar was educated when he was 13 or 14 years old. He attended The Latin School, part of the academy and the College of Philadelphia (now known as University of Pennsylvania) in Philadelphia, Pennsylvania until his father's death. Caesar was the only one of the Rodney children to receive anything approaching a formal education. Caesar Rodney's father died in 1746. Caesar's guardianship was entrusted to Delaware Supreme Court Justice Nicholas Ridgely by the Delaware Orphan's Court.

== Professional and political career ==
Thomas Rodney described his brother at this time as having a "great fund of wit and humor of the pleasing kind, so that his conversation was always bright and strong and conducted by wisdom..." He lived as a bachelor, was generally esteemed and was very popular. He had professed his love and affection for several Delaware ladies at various times but was never a successful suitor. He easily moved into the political world formerly occupied by his father and guardian.

At age twenty-seven in 1755, he was elected sheriff of Kent County and served the maximum three years allowed. This was a powerful and financially rewarding position, in that it supervised elections and chose the grand jurors who set the county tax rate. After serving his three years, he was appointed to a series of positions including Register of Wills, Recorder of Deeds, Clerk of the Orphan's Court, Justice of the Peace, and judge in the lower courts.

During the French and Indian War, he was commissioned captain of the Dover Hundred company in Colonel John Vining's regiment of the Delaware militia. They never saw active service. From 1769 to 1777, he was an associate justice of the Supreme Court of the Lower Counties.

Eighteenth-century Delaware was politically divided into loose factions known as the "Court Party" and the "Country Party." The majority Court Party was generally Anglican, strongest in Kent and Sussex Counties, worked well with the colonial proprietary government, and was in favor of reconciliation with the British government. The minority Country Party was largely Ulster-Scot, centered in New Castle County, and quickly advocated independence from the British. In spite of being members of the Anglican Kent County gentry, Rodney and his brother Thomas increasingly aligned themselves with the Country Party, a distinct minority in Kent County. As such, he generally worked in partnership with Thomas McKean from New Castle County and in opposition to George Read.

== American Revolution ==
In 1765, Rodney joined McKean as a delegate to the Stamp Act Congress and was a leader of the Delaware Committee of Correspondence. He began his service in the Assembly of Delaware in the 1761/1762 session and continued in office to the 1775/1776 session. Several times he served as speaker, including the momentous day of June 15, 1776, when "with Rodney in the chair and Thomas McKean leading the debate on the floor," the Assembly of Delaware voted to sever all ties with the British Parliament and King.

Declaration of Independence, by John Trumbull (1818) portrays the presentation of the Declaration of Independence to Congress. Rodney is not depicted.

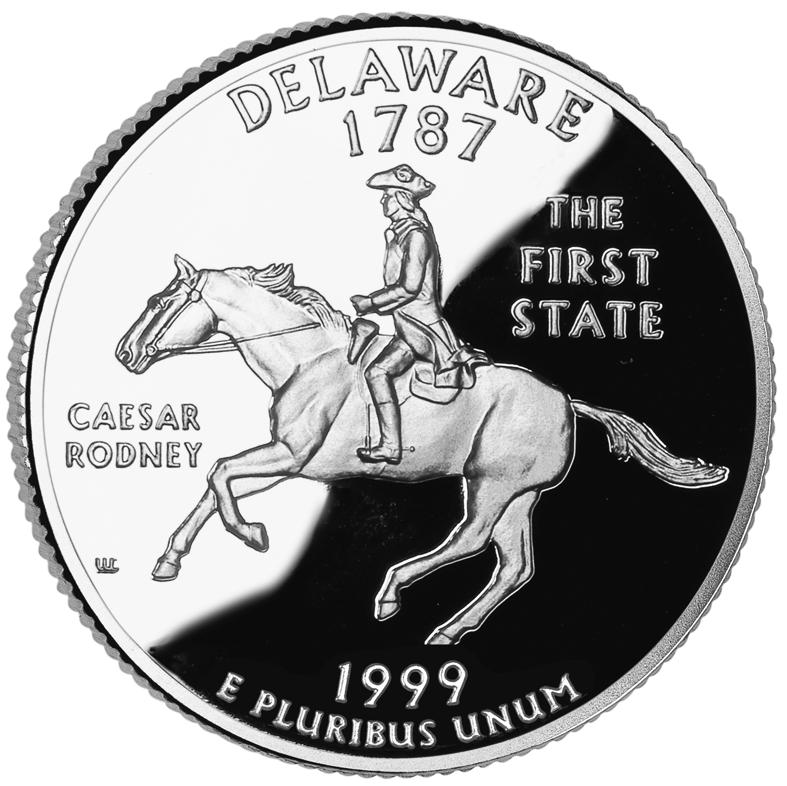
Caesar Rodney on the 1999 Delaware State Quarter.

Rodney served in the Continental Congress along with McKean and Read from 1774 to 1776. Rodney was in Dover tending to Loyalist activity in Sussex County when he received word from McKean that he and Read were deadlocked on the vote for independence. To break the deadlock, Rodney rode 70 miles (110 km) through a thunderstorm on the night of July 1, 1776, arriving in Philadelphia "in his boots and spurs" on July 2, just as the voting on the Lee Resolution had begun.

He voted with McKean and thereby allowed Delaware to join eleven other states in voting in favor of the resolution of independence. The wording of the Declaration of Independence was approved two days later. Rodney signed it on August 2. Backlash in Delaware led to Rodney's electoral defeat in Kent County for a seat in the upcoming Delaware Constitutional Convention and the new Delaware General Assembly.

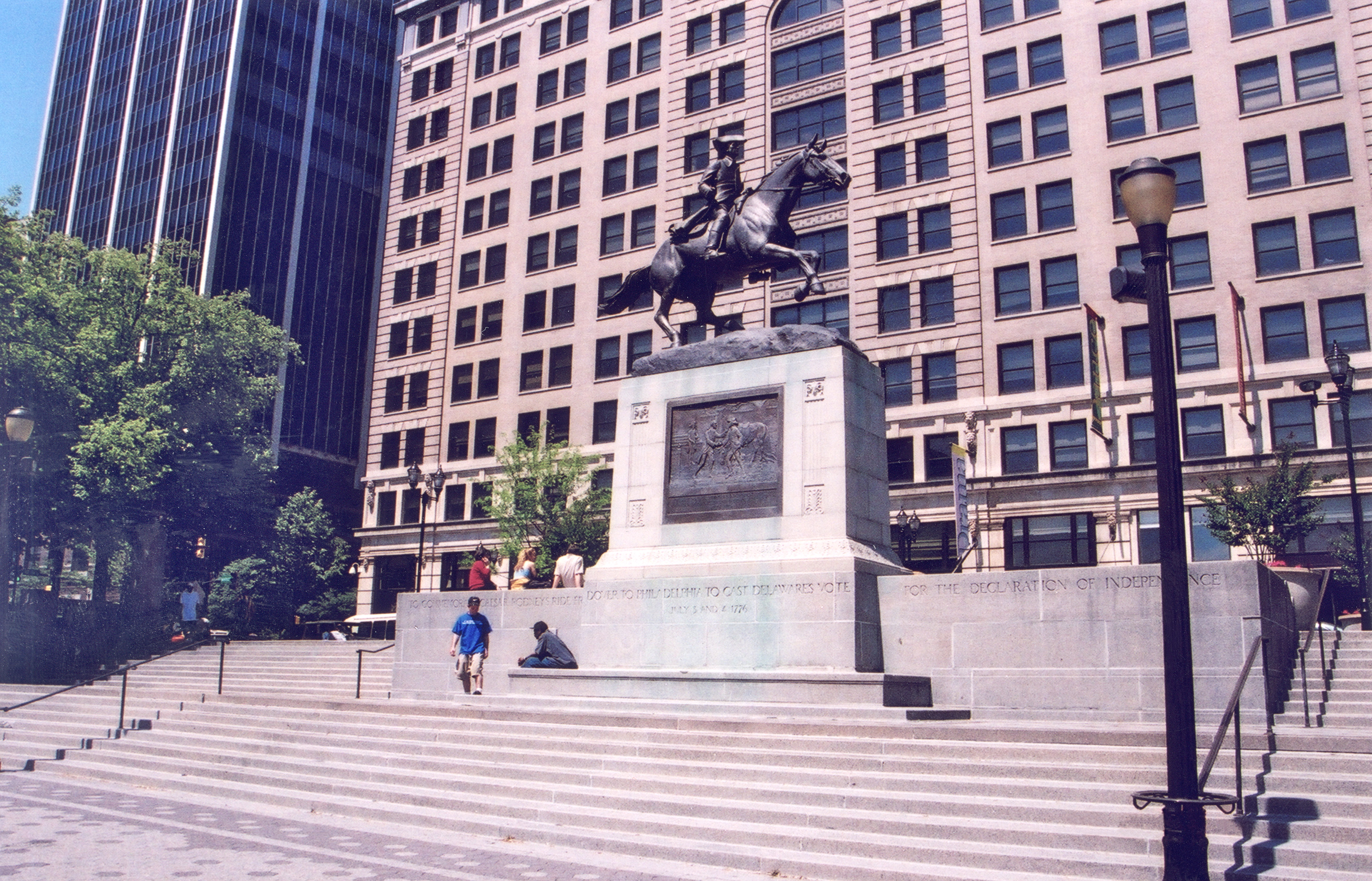
An Equestrian statue of Caesar Rodney on Rodney Square. Removed in June 2020, it is currently exhibited in Washington, D.C.’s Freedom Plaza.

Upon learning of the death of his friend John Haslet at the Battle of Princeton, Rodney rushed to the Continental Army to try to fill his place. Haslet was succeeded as colonel by David Hall, as General George Washington returned Rodney home to be Delaware's wartime governor and major-general of Delaware militia. The regiment Haslet had built was virtually destroyed at the Battle of Camden in 1780. Rodney, as major-general of the Delaware militia, protected the state from British military intrusions and controlled continued Loyalist activity, particularly in Sussex County, site of the 1780 Black Camp Rebellion.

In October 1777, amidst the catastrophic events following the Battle of Brandywine and the British occupation of Wilmington and Philadelphia, a new General Assembly was elected. It promptly put Rodney and McKean back into the Continental Congress. With state President John McKinly in captivity and President George Read completely exhausted, they elected Rodney as President of Delaware on March 31, 1778.

The office did not have the authority of a modern governor in the United States, so Rodney's success came from his popularity with the General Assembly, where the real authority lay, and from the loyalty of the Delaware militia, which was the only means of enforcing that authority. Via his distant Italian heritage, one source has identified Rodney as the first Italian-American governor of a U.S. state.

Meanwhile, Rodney scoured the state for money, supplies and soldiers to support the national war effort. Delaware Continentals had fought well in many battles from the Battle of Long Island to the Battle of Monmouth, but in 1780 the army suffered its worst defeat at the Battle of Camden in South Carolina. The regiment was nearly destroyed and the remnant so reduced it could only fight with a Maryland regiment for the remainder of the war. Rodney had done much to stabilize the situation, but his health was worsening, and he resigned his office on November 6, 1781, just after the conclusive Battle of Yorktown.

Rodney was elected by the Delaware General Assembly to the United States Congress under the Articles of Confederation in 1782 and 1783 but was unable to attend because of ill health. Two years after leaving the state presidency he was elected to the 1783/84 session of the Legislative Council. As a final gesture of respect, the council selected him to be their speaker. His health was now in rapid decline. Even though the Legislative Council met at his home for a short time, he died before the session ended.

Delaware General Assembly (sessions while President)
| Year | Assembly | Senate Majority | Speaker | House Majority | Speaker |
|---|---|---|---|---|---|
| 1777/78 | 2nd | Non-partisan | George Read | Non-partisan | Samuel West |
| 1778/79 | 3rd | Non-partisan | Thomas Collins | Non-partisan | Simon Kollock |
| 1779/80 | 4th | Non-partisan | John Clowes | Non-partisan | Simon Kollock |
| 1780/81 | 5th | Non-partisan | John Clowes | Non-partisan | Simon Kollock |

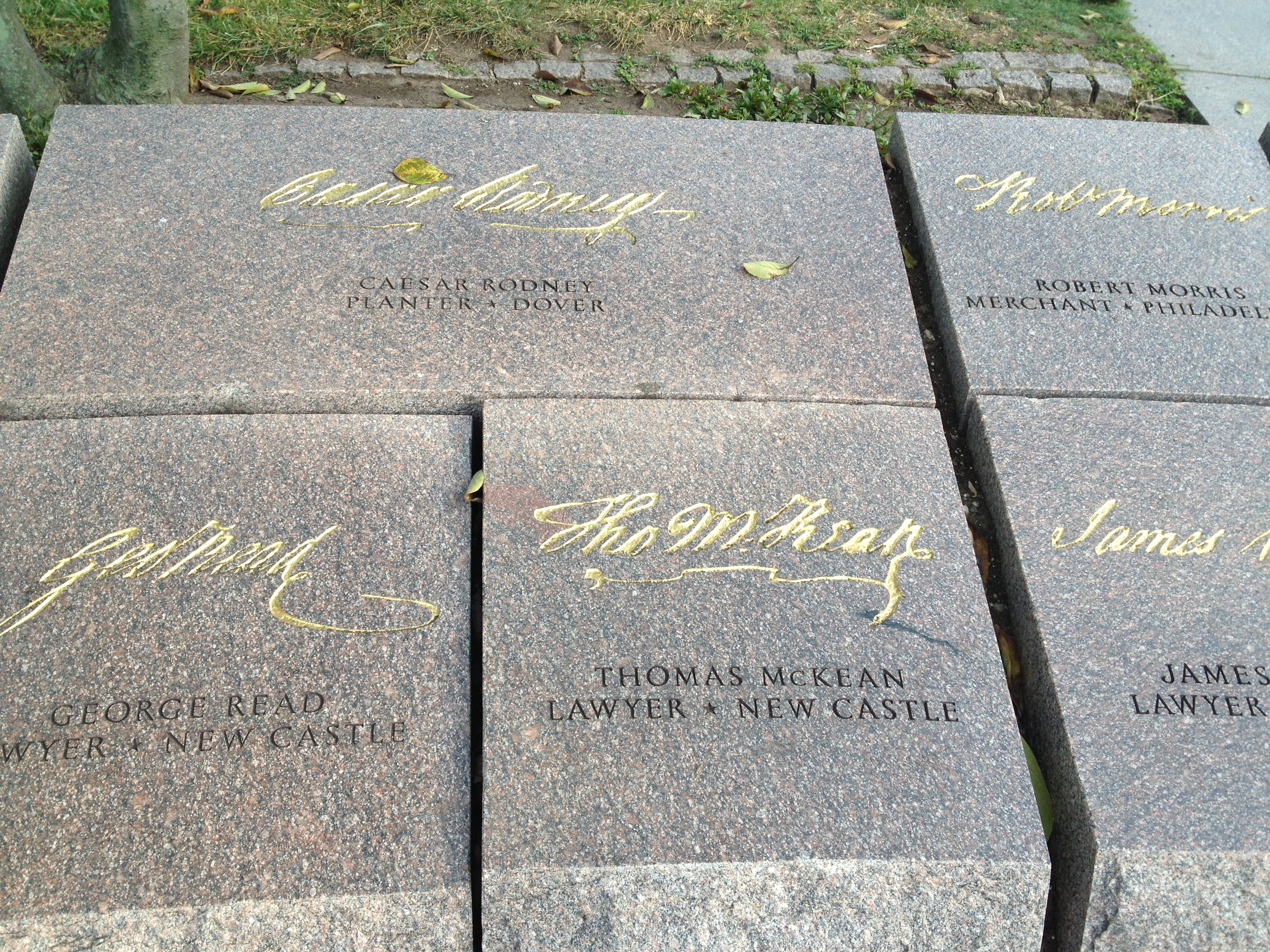
The Memorial to the 56 Signers of the Declaration of Independence in Washington, D.C., Rodney's depicted signature is at the upper left

== Death and legacy ==
Rodney was tormented throughout his life by asthma, and his adult years were plagued by a facial cancer. He experienced expensive, painful, and futile medical treatments for the cancer. Rodney wore a green scarf to hide his disfigured face. He died from the disease after eight years. His body is buried at an unmarked grave on his beloved farm, "Poplar Grove", known as "Byfield" today.

While there is a marker that appears to be a gravestone for Caesar Rodney at Christ Episcopal Church, this is merely a monument. Many sources cite that he is buried there; however, most Delaware historians believe that the remains of one of Rodney's unidentified relatives is buried there instead. Rodney is buried in an unmarked grave in his family's unmarked plot on their former 800-acre farm (320 ha) east of Dover Air Force Base.

The Caesar Rodney School District in Delaware is named after him.

A statue of Rodney riding a horse was unveiled in Rodney Square in Wilmington, Delaware on July 4, 1923. The statue was removed and placed in private storage in 2020, amidst the George Floyd protests. The statue was placed in Freedom Plaza in Washington, D.C. in May 2026, for what was intended to be a six month stay.

== Positions held ==
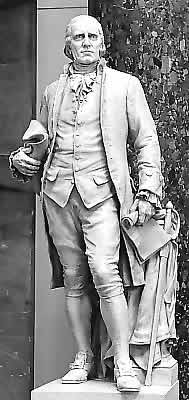
Caesar Rodney, by Bryant Baker, is exhibited in the National Statuary Hall Collection

Elections were held October 1. Members of the General Assembly took office on October 20 or the following weekday. The State Legislative Council was created in 1776. Its Legislative Councilmen had a three-year term. State Assemblymen had a one-year term.

The whole General Assembly chose the Continental Congressmen for a one-year term and the State President for a three-year term. The county sheriff had a three-year term. Associate Justices of the state Supreme Court were selected by the General Assembly for the life of the person appointed.

Public offices
| Office | Type | Location | Began office | Ended office | Notes |
|---|---|---|---|---|---|
| Sheriff | Executive | Dover | October 1, 1755 | October 1, 1756 | Kent County |
| Sheriff | Executive | Dover | October 1, 1756 | October 1, 1757 | Kent County |
| Sheriff | Executive | Dover | October 1, 1757 | October 2, 1758 | Kent County |
| Justice of the Peace | Judiciary | New Castle | 1759 | 1769 | Court of Common Pleas |
| Assemblyman | Legislature | New Castle | October 20, 1761 | October 20, 1762 | |
| Assemblyman | Legislature | New Castle | October 20, 1762 | October 20, 1763 | |
| Assemblyman | Legislature | New Castle | October 20, 1763 | October 20, 1764 | |
| Assemblyman | Legislature | New Castle | October 20, 1764 | October 20, 1765 | |
| Delegate | Legislature | New York | October 7, 1765 | October 19, 1765 | Stamp Act Congress |
| Assemblyman | Legislature | New Castle | October 20, 1765 | October 20, 1766 | |
| Assemblyman | Legislature | New Castle | October 20, 1766 | October 20, 1767 | |
| Assemblyman | Legislature | New Castle | October 20, 1767 | October 20, 1768 | |
| Assemblyman | Legislature | New Castle | October 20, 1768 | October 20, 1769 | |
| Associate Justice | Judiciary | New Castle | 1769 | 1777 | Supreme Court |
| Assemblyman | Legislature | New Castle | October 20, 1769 | October 20, 1770 | Speaker |
| Assemblyman | Legislature | New Castle | October 20, 1770 | October 20, 1771 | Speaker |
| Assemblyman | Legislature | New Castle | October 20, 1771 | October 20, 1772 | |
| Assemblyman | Legislature | New Castle | October 20, 1772 | October 20, 1773 | |
| Assemblyman | Legislature | New Castle | October 20, 1773 | October 20, 1774 | |
| Delegate | Legislature | Philadelphia | August 2, 1774 | March 16, 1775 | Continental Congress |
| Assemblyman | Legislature | New Castle | October 20, 1774 | October 20, 1775 | |
| Delegate | Legislature | Philadelphia | March 16, 1775 | October 21, 1775 | Continental Congress |
| Assemblyman | Legislature | New Castle | October 20, 1775 | June 15, 1776 | Speaker |
| Delegate | Legislature | Philadelphia | October 21, 1775 | November 7, 1776 | Continental Congress |
| Delegate | Legislature | York | December 17, 1777 | June 27, 1778 | Continental Congress (did not serve) |
| Delegate | Legislature | Philadelphia | July 2, 1778 | January 18, 1779 | Continental Congress (did not serve) |
| State President | Executive | Dover | March 31, 1778 | November 6, 1781 | |
| Delegate | Legislature | Philadelphia | February 2, 1782 | February 1, 1783 | Continental Congress (did not serve) |
| Delegate | Legislature | Philadelphia | February 1, 1783 | June 21, 1783 | Continental Congress (did not serve) |
| Delegate | Legislature | Princeton | June 30, 1783 | November 4, 1783 | Continental Congress (did not serve) |
| Delegate | Legislature | Annapolis | November 26, 1783 | April 8, 1784 | Continental Congress (did not serve) |
| Councilman | Legislature | Dover | October 20, 1783 | June 26, 1784 | |

Delaware General Assembly service
| Dates | Assembly | Chamber | Majority | Governor | Committees | District |
|---|---|---|---|---|---|---|
| 1783/84 | 8th | State Council | Non-partisan | Nicholas Van Dyke | Speaker | Kent at-large |

== In popular culture ==
Caesar Rodney appears in the 1969 Broadway musical 1776 and its 1972 film adaptation. He is portrayed as an elderly man suffering severely from facial cancer, and he has to be taken home by fellow Delaware delegate Thomas McKean. Later, John Adams sends McKean back to Delaware to bring back Rodney to break the deadlock over independence between pro-independence McKean and anti-independence George Read. He is portrayed in the musical by Robert Gaus and in the film by William Hansen.

Caesar Rodney appears in HBO's 2008 miniseries John Adams. He is played by Tim Parati.

== See also ==
- Memorial to the 56 Signers of the Declaration of Independence

== Notes ==
Political offices
| Preceded by George Read | President of Delaware; 1778–1781 | Succeeded by John Dickinson |
