= James Tilton =

American politician and physician

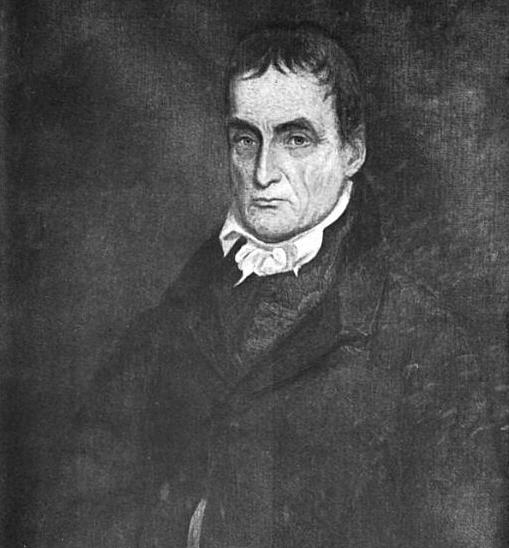

Surgeon General of the United States Army
- In office 1813–1815

Personal details
- Born: June 1, 1745
- Died: May 14, 1822 (aged 76)
- Occupation: Physician

Military service
- Allegiance: United States
- Branch/service: Army
- Battles/wars: American Revolutionary War; War of 1812

James Tilton (June 1, 1745 – May 14, 1822) was an American medical doctor and soldier from Dover, Delaware. He was a delegate for Delaware in the Continental Congress of 1783 and 1784 and served as Surgeon General of the United States Army during the War of 1812.

== Early life ==
James was born in 1745 to Thomas Tilton, a farmer in Kent County, Delaware. After attending the West Nottingham Academy in Cecil County, Maryland, he attended the College of Philadelphia, which later became the University of Pennsylvania. He graduated in 1768 and earned a degree as a Doctor of Medicine in 1771. He started a medical practice at Dover and served as an infantry Lieutenant in Dover's Company of the Kent County militia.

== American Revolutionary War ==
When the Revolutionary War began, his militia became part of the 1st Delaware Regiment of the Continental Army. Colonel John Haslet quickly reassigned him to duty as the regimental surgeon. He served with distinction and saw action at the battles of Brooklyn, White Plains, Trenton, and Princeton. Haslet's unit was virtually destroyed in the Battle of Princeton in January 1777. Colonel Haslet was killed, and the command structure was rebuilt.

Tilton remained in service with the Continental Army as the head of military hospitals, first at Princeton and later at Trenton, New Jersey and other sites. When active fighting ended in 1781, he returned to his practice at Dover.

== Later life ==
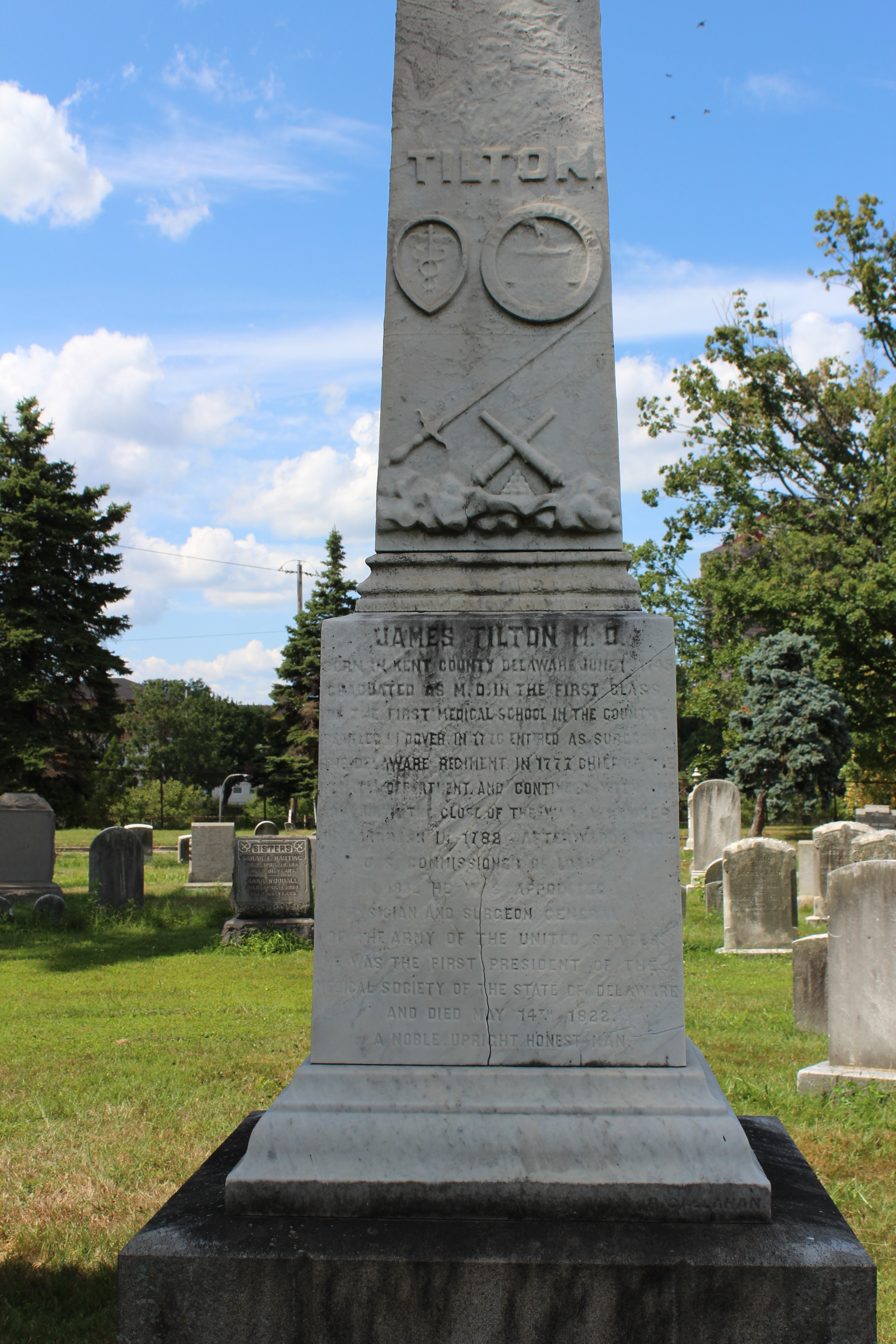
James Tilton Memorial at Wilmington and Brandywine Cemetery

As the war was ending, the surviving Delaware officers organized a chapter in the Society of the Cincinnati. Tilton was elected as its first president at a meeting in Wilmington on July 4, 1783, and served in that office until 1793. During that time, he also moved to a home and farm just outside Wilmington.

Delaware named Tilton as a delegate to the Continental Congress three times from 1783 to 1785, but he did not attend sessions in the last year. He also served several terms in the state's House of Representatives.

The War of 1812 caused the US Army to reorganize support and administrative functions in 1813, which included the creation of a position for a Surgeon General of the Army. Tilton was the first to be appointed to that position and served from June 1813 until June 15, 1815.

Tilton died in 1822 at his home just outside Wilmington. He is buried in the Wilmington and Brandywine Cemetery. He was a longtime member of the American Philosophical Society, elected in 1773 and headed the Delaware Medical Society.
