= John McKinly =

American physician and politician

1st President of Delaware
- In office February 12, 1777 – September 22, 1777
- Preceded by: Office established
- Succeeded by: Thomas McKean

Personal details
- Born: February 24, 1721 Ulster, Ireland
- Died: August 31, 1796 (aged 75) Wilmington, Delaware, U.S.
- Party: Federalist
- Spouse: Jane Richardson
- Occupation: Politician
- Profession: Physician

John McKinly (February 24, 1721 – August 31, 1796) was an American physician and politician from Wilmington, Delaware. He was a veteran of the French and Indian War, served in the Delaware General Assembly, was the first elected president of Delaware, and for a time was a member of the Federalist Party.

== Early life and family ==
McKinly was born in Ulster, Ireland and immigrated to Delaware in 1742. In 1761, he married Jane "Jenny" Richardson, a daughter of the Quaker miller, Richard Richardson. They had no children. Their home was at the northwest corner of 3rd and French Streets in Wilmington, now the location of an office building. They were members of the First Presbyterian Church, which is now known as the First and Central Presbyterian Church at Rodney Square in Wilmington. He established himself as a popular physician. In 1747 he was commissioned a lieutenant in the New Castle County militia, and in 1756, during the French and Indian War, he was commissioned again as a major. Along with others, he built a bombproof battery and magazine at the site of the old Fort Christina, in an area known as "the Rocks." It was proudly reported that it equaled if not exceeded, "any on the continent for strength and beauty."

== Political career ==
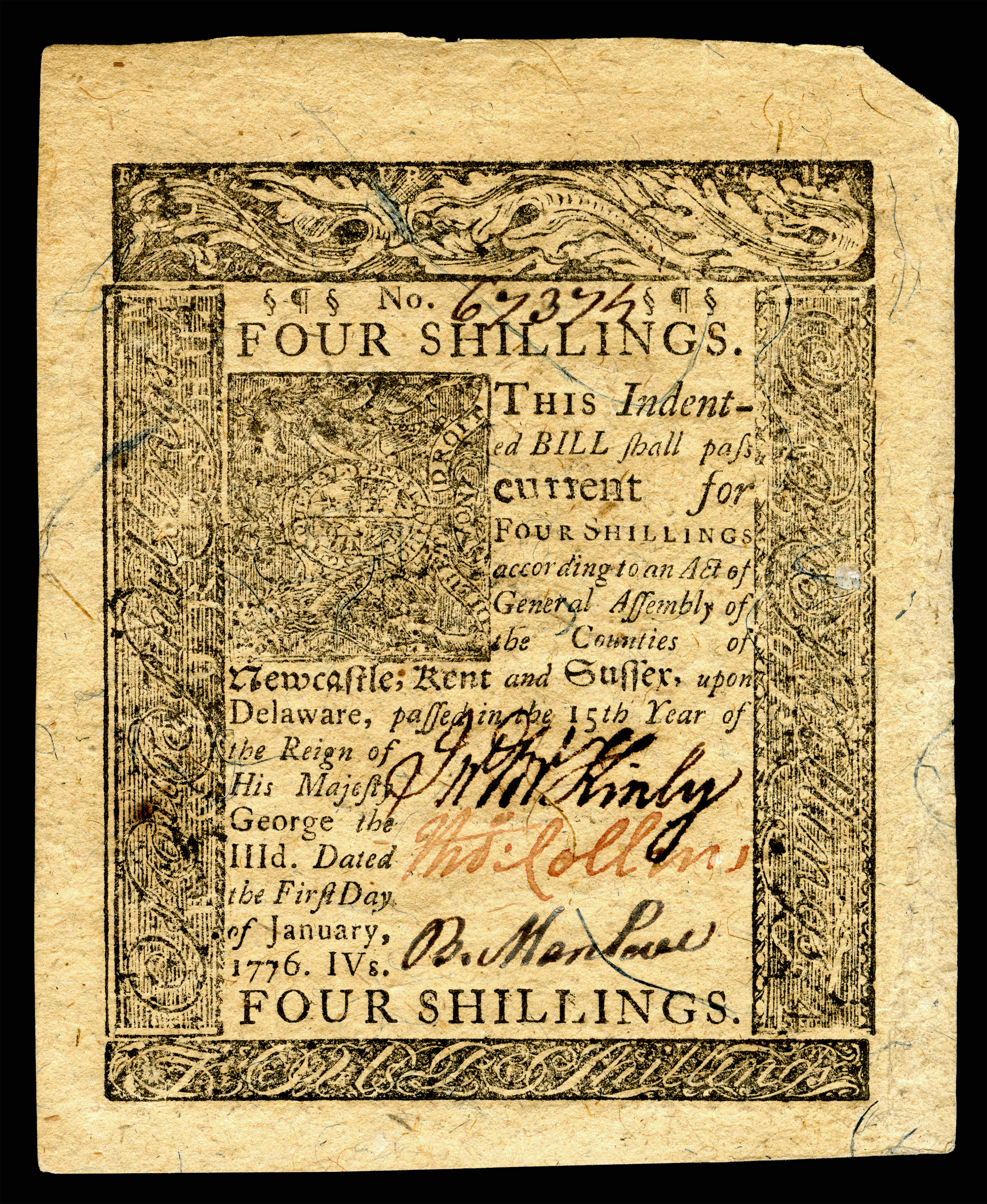
Colonial Delaware currency (1776) hand-signed by McKinly

Eighteenth century Delaware was politically divided into loose factions known as the "Court Party" and the "Country Party." The majority Court Party was generally Anglican, strongest in Kent County and Sussex County, worked well with the colonial Proprietary government, and was in favor of reconciliation with the British government. The minority Country Party was largely Ulster-Scot, centered in New Castle County, and quickly advocated the idea of independence from the British. McKinly, like most of the rest of population and the majority in the General Assembly, was associated with the Court Party and its moderate policies. However, his Ulster-Scots background and prominence in the Presbyterian Church community made him acceptable to many who normally associated themselves with the Country Party.

McKinly was elected Sheriff of New Castle County in 1757, served 4 three-year terms as Chief Burgess of the town of Wilmington between 1758 and 1776. He also represented New Castle County in the Assembly of the Delaware or Lower Counties from the 1771/72 session through the 1775/76 session. In the events leading up to the American Revolution, he became a member of the Delaware Committee of Correspondence in October 1773, and was chairman by November 1774. Meanwhile, he served as Brigadier General of the New Castle County militia.

When the Assembly of the Lower Counties declared its separation from the British government on June 15, 1776, it created a Council of Safety to run the newly independent state when the Assembly was not in session. It consisted of five members from each county. McKinly was one of those representing New Castle County, and was elected President of the committee. Then when Delaware elected its first House of Assembly in October 1776, he was again elected to represent New Castle County in the 1776/77 session, and was chosen by that body as its Speaker.

== President of Delaware ==

On February 12, 1777, the General Assembly elected him to be Delaware's first Chief Magistrate or President and he served until he was replaced on September 22, 1777. As President, he was immediately faced with an insurrection by Loyalists, particularly in Sussex County. There was also an immediate need to recruit new soldiers for the Delaware regiment in the Continental Army, as the enlistments of the original regiment had expired. However, events completely overtook him after the major British victory at the Battle of Brandywine on September 11, 1777.

The evening after the battle the 71st Regiment, Frazer's Highlanders, were sent the 10 miles to Wilmington to meet up with the British fleet on the Delaware River and establish a hospital for the wounded. In the course of doing so they found and captured the state treasury, including most of the state papers. They also found President McKinly at home in his bed, and they took him into captivity as well. He was kept as a prisoner of war on the Roebuck, and later on the Solebay in the Delaware River.

John Scharf in his History of Delaware describes the situation:

General Howe remained in camp on the Brandywine, and on the evening after the battle sent a detachment of troops to Wilmington to seize President John McKinly and secure such plunder as might fall in their way. They took the President from his bed at dead of night, and seizing a sloop that lay in the stream, loaded it with valuables stolen from the people, a large quantity of public and private money, many of the public and private records and all the papers and certificates of the loan and treasury offices. With these rich prizes the marauders returned to camp, but on the 12th and 13th the town of Wilmington was occupied in force by the British, while the men-of-war Roebuck and Liverpool laid opposite the town. Many of the British wounded had been brought into Wilmington, and the people at least knew that they were safe from bombardment so long as any of their houses were turned into British hospitals.

In an August 20, 1778 letter to Henry Laurens, the President of the Continental Congress, McKinly wrote:

Several circumstance concurred to render my staying at Wilmington necessary to the public whilst the enemy were moving toward Philadelphia, and being more solicitous to perform my duty, than for my own personal safety, I was unexpectedly made a prisoner in my own house there on the night succeeding the 12th day of September last, by the 71st British Regiment, said to contain at that time of 900 men, who were detached to take possession of that place for the accommodation of such of their Army as were wounded the day preceding, at the Battle of Brandywine. I sustained at this time some heavy losses of private property.

When the British left Philadelphia in June 1778, McKinly was transferred to Flatbush, New York. He was finally paroled in August 1778, having been exchanged for William Franklin, Loyalist Governor of New Jersey, and Benjamin Franklin's son.

Delaware General Assembly (sessions while President)
| Year | Assembly | Senate Majority | Speaker | House Majority | Speaker |
|---|---|---|---|---|---|
| 1776/77 | 1st | non-partisan | George Read | non-partisan | Thomas McKean |

== Professional career ==
After his release, McKinly returned to his medical practice and remained active in Wilmington affairs. He never held political office again, refusing an appointment to the Continental Congress and losing a General Assembly election for his old job as president in February 1783. He helped found the Delaware Medical Society in 1789 and was also a member of the Newark Academy Board of Trustees before 1783, becoming President of the Board from 1794 until his death in 1796. The Academy of Newark eventually developed into the University of Delaware. He was known to have contributed to the salaries of the teachers in the school and sponsored many students in their education.

== Death and legacy ==
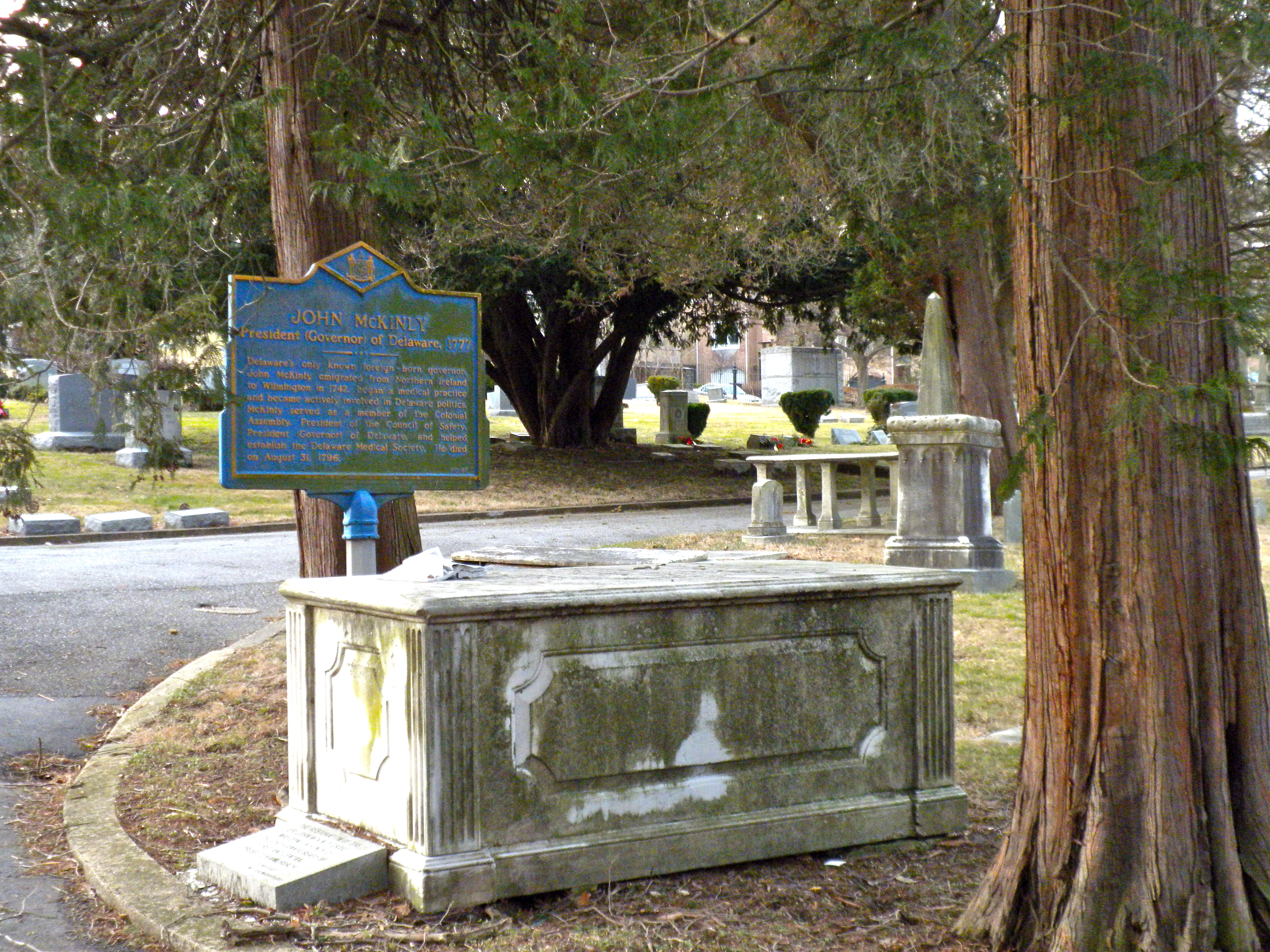
McKinly's grave in Wilmington and Brandywine Cemetery with a Delaware State historical marker

McKinly died at Wilmington and was buried first in the Presbyterian Cemetery there. This cemetery is now the location of the Wilmington Institute Library and his remains were then moved to the Wilmington and Brandywine Cemetery in 1922. There is a marker placed in his memory in the cemetery at South Park Drive, near its intersection with North Adams Street.

McKinly was the only Chief Executive of Delaware known to have been born in a foreign country. Although he was an Ulster-Scot native, and resident in New Castle County, he was a moderate on the issue of independence, viewing the break with Britain with reluctance and regret. This being the position held by most of the population, he was widely acceptable, especially in Kent County and Sussex County. George Read was his political ally and mentor, and most likely lined up the support for his election as president. Thomas McKean and his allies were, therefore, generally opponents. Ardent revolutionaries such as James Tilton referred to him as "a patch on the back of George Read," and an "old woman." McKinly always blamed Thomas McKean for the lengthy captivity he endured.

The John McKinly Laboratory at the University of Delaware is named in his honor.

There is no known portrait of John McKinly.

== Almanac ==
Elections were held October 1 and members of the General Assembly took office on October 20 or the following weekday. Provincial and State Assemblymen had a one-year term. The whole General Assembly chose the State President for a three-year term. The county sheriff and town Chief Burgess also had a three-year term.

Public offices
| Office | Type | Location | Took office | Left office | Notes |
|---|---|---|---|---|---|
| Sheriff | Judiciary | New Castle | October 4, 1757 | October 3, 1760 | New Castle County |
| Chief Burgess | Executive | Wilmington | October 20, 1758 | October 20, 1761 | Wilmington |
| Chief Burgess | Executive | Wilmington | October 20, 1766 | October 20, 1769 | Wilmington |
| Chief Burgess | Executive | Wilmington | October 20, 1770 | October 20, 1773 | Wilmington |
| Assemblyman | Legislature | New Castle | October 21, 1771 | October 20, 1772 | |
| Assemblyman | Legislature | New Castle | October 20, 1772 | October 20, 1773 | |
| Assemblyman | Legislature | New Castle | October 20, 1773 | October 20, 1774 | |
| Assemblyman | Legislature | New Castle | October 20, 1774 | October 20, 1775 | |
| Chief Burgess | Executive | Wilmington | October 20, 1774 | October 28, 1776 | Wilmington |
| Assemblyman | Legislature | New Castle | October 20, 1775 | June 15, 1776 | |
| President | Executive | New Castle | June 15, 1776 | October 28, 1776 | Council of Safety |
| Assemblyman | Legislature | New Castle | October 28, 1776 | February 12, 1777 | |
| State President | Executive | New Castle | February 12, 1777 | September 22, 1777 | |

Delaware General Assembly service
| Dates | Assembly | Chamber | Majority | Governor | Committees | District |
|---|---|---|---|---|---|---|
| 1776/77 | 1st | State House | non-partisan | none | Speaker | New Castle at-large |

== See also ==
- List of United States governors born outside the United States

== Notes ==
Political offices
| New office | President of Delaware; February 12, 1777 – September 12, 1777 | Succeeded by Thomas McKean |
