= Thomas Collins (Delaware politician) =

American politician

8th President of Delaware
- In office October 28, 1786 – March 29, 1789
- Preceded by: Nicholas Van Dyke
- Succeeded by: Jehu Davis

Personal details
- Born: 1732 Duck Creek, Delaware Colony
- Died: March 29, 1789 (aged 56–57) Smyrna, Delaware
- Resting place: Saint Peter's Cemetery, Smyrna
- Spouse: Sarah
- Profession: Planter

Thomas Collins (1732 – March 29, 1789) was an American planter and politician from Smyrna, in Kent County, Delaware. He was an officer of the Delaware militia during the American Revolution, and served in the Delaware General Assembly and as president of Delaware.

== Early life and family ==
Collins was born in Duck Creek, now Smyrna, Delaware. He married Sarah, and had four children, William, Elizabeth, Mary, and Sarah. His sister was the wife of former Governor John Cook. Collins was trained in the law, but never practiced, and must have had considerable wealth available to him as he purchased several large tracts of land in the Duck Creek area early in life. They lived first at Gloster on the south side of Dawson's Branch and after 1771 at Belmont Hall, now on U.S. Highway 13, south of Smyrna. They were members of St. Peter's Episcopal Church.

== Military career ==
Collins began his military career during the American Revolution as lieutenant colonel in Caesar Rodney's Upper Kent militia and within a year was a brigadier general of the Delaware Militia. Collins served with General George Washington in New Jersey in 1777, but returned home to contend with loyalist uprisings in Sussex County. He was probably involved in the efforts to block General William Howe on his march from the Elk River, but there is no evidence that he was at the actual Battle of Brandywine.

== Professional and political career ==
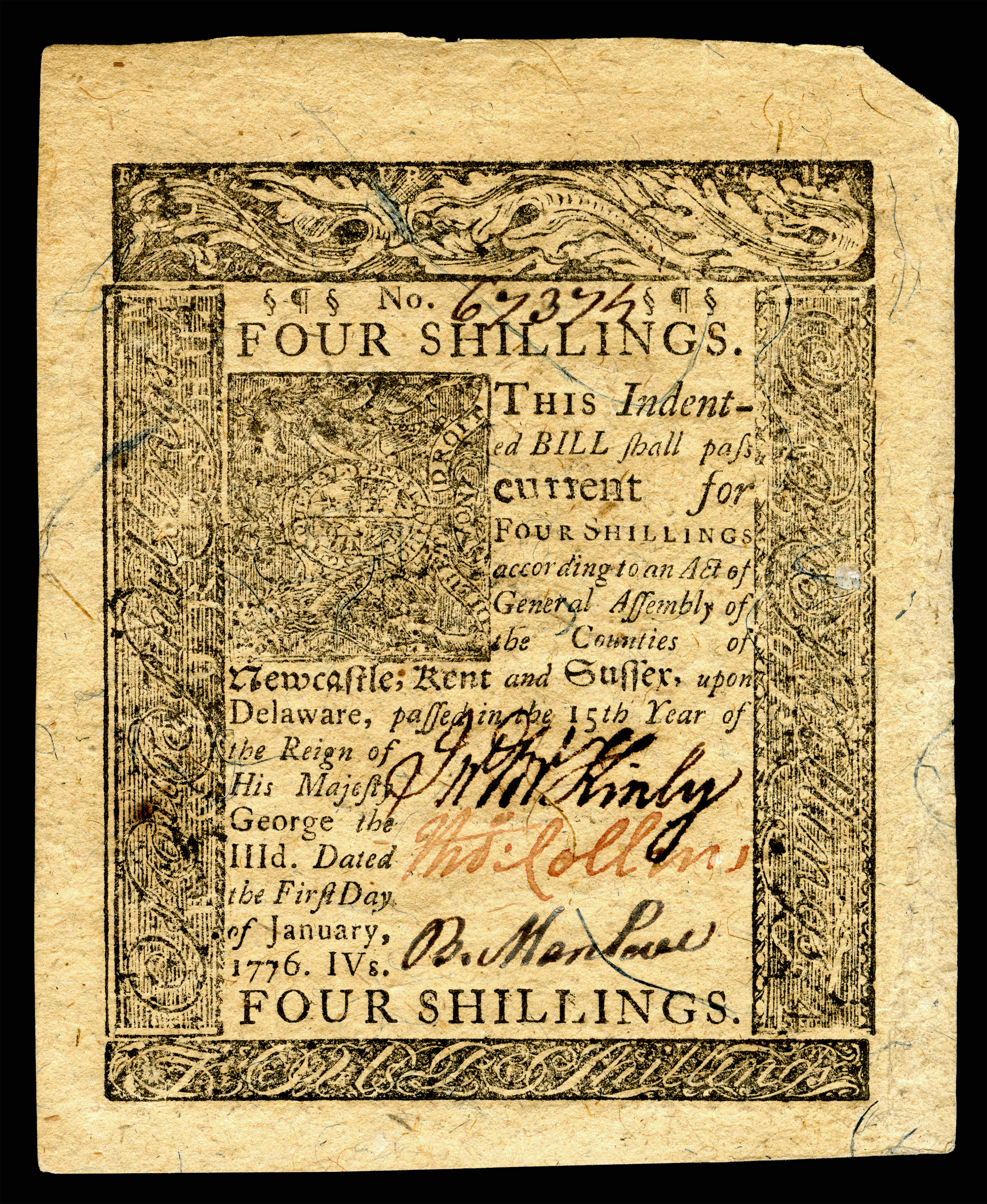
Colonial Delaware currency (1776) signed by Collins

Collins served as sheriff of Kent County from 1764 until 1767, and was a member of the Colonial Assembly in five of the nine annual sessions during the period from the 1767/68 session through the 1775/76 session. He was a member of the Delaware Constitutional Convention of 1776 and was elected to two terms in the Legislative Council beginning with the 1776/77 session and continuing through the 1782/83 session, serving as the Speaker in the 1778/79 session and in the 1781/82 session. In 1782, he became a Judge of the Court of Common Pleas. The Delaware General Assembly unanimously elected him state president in 1786 and he served from October 28, 1786 until his death on March 29, 1789. It was during his term of office that Delaware became the first state to ratify the U.S. Constitution on December 7, 1787.

Delaware General Assembly (sessions while president)
Year	Assembly	Senate majority	Speaker	House majority	Speaker
1786/87	11th	non-partisan	George Craighead	non-partisan	John Cook
1787/88	12th	non-partisan	Thomas McDonough	non-partisan	Thomas Rodney
1788/89	13th	non-partisan	George Mitchell	non-partisan	Jehu Davis

== Death and legacy ==
Collins died at Duck Creek, now Smyrna. He was buried in the Collins Family Cemetery, but his remains were later moved into the St. Peter's Episcopal Church Cemetery at Smyrna. He was the first State President to die in office.

The Thomas Collins state office building on U.S. Highway 13 in Dover is named in his honor.

== Almanac ==
Elections were held October 1 and members of the General Assembly took office on October 20 or the following weekday. State Legislative Councilmen had a three-year term and State Assemblymen had a one-year term. The whole General Assembly chose the State President for a three-year term. The county sheriff also had a three-year term. Judges of the Courts of Common Pleas were also selected by the General Assembly for the life of the person appointed.

Public offices
Office	Type	Location	Began office	Ended office	Notes
Sheriff	Judiciary	Dover	1764	1767	Kent County
Assemblyman	Legislature	New Castle	October 20, 1767	October 21, 1768	
Assemblyman	Legislature	New Castle	October 21, 1768	October 20, 1769	
Assemblyman	Legislature	New Castle	October 21, 1769	October 20, 1770	
Assemblyman	Legislature	New Castle	October 21, 1772	October 20, 1773	
Assemblyman	Legislature	New Castle	October 21, 1775	June 15, 1776	
Delegate	Convention	Dover	August 27, 1776	September 20, 1776	State Constitution
Councilman	Legislature	New Castle	October 20, 1776	October 20, 1779	
Councilman	Legislature	Dover	October 20, 1779	October 20, 1782	
Judge	Judiciary	Dover	1782	1786	Court of Common Pleas
State President	Executive	Dover	October 28, 1786	March 29, 1789	

Delaware General Assembly service
Dates	Assembly	Chamber	Majority	Governor	Committees	District
1776/77	1st	State Council	non-partisan	John McKinly		Kent at-large
1777/78	2nd	State Council	non-partisan	George Read		Kent at-large
1778/79	3rd	State Council	non-partisan	Caesar Rodney	Speaker	Kent at-large
1779/80	4th	State Council	non-partisan	Caesar Rodney		Kent at-large
1780/81	5th	State Council	non-partisan	Caesar Rodney	Speaker	Kent at-large
1781/82	6th	State Council	non-partisan	John Dickinson	Speaker	Kent at-large

Political offices
Preceded by Nicholas Van Dyke	President of Delaware; 1786–1789	Succeeded by Jehu Davis
