= John Cook (Delaware politician) =

American planter and politician

6th President of Delaware
- In office November 4, 1782 – February 1, 1783
- Preceded by: John Dickinson
- Succeeded by: Nicholas Van Dyke

Personal details
- Born: 1730 Smyrna, Delaware Colony
- Died: 1789 (aged 58–59) Smyrna, Delaware, U.S.
- Spouse: Elizabeth Collins
- Occupation: Planter

John Cook (1730–1789) was an American planter and politician from Smyrna, in Kent County, Delaware. He served in the Delaware General Assembly and as Governor of Delaware.

== Early life and family ==
Cook was born in Duck Creek, now Smyrna, son of Michal and Lois Cook. He was first cousin to Thomas Collins, the State President. He supposedly married Elizabeth Collins, the sister of Thomas Collins, and if so, married his first cousin. They had five children: Sarah, Margaret, Elizabeth, Michael, and Robert. He was a prosperous farmer and tanner and gradually acquired a considerable amount of land in the area. Included in the property at one time was Belmont Hall,. The Cook home, however, was probably to the west of the present U.S. Highway 13, across the road from Belmont Hall. They were members of St. Peter's Episcopal Church in Smyrna.

== Professional and political career ==
Cook was Sheriff of Kent County from 1772 until 1778, just before the American Revolution. Like many of his Anglican neighbors in Kent County, Cook was fundamentally opposed to the break with Great Britain and was counted among the conservatives whose loyalty to the new government was suspect. However, he was personally liked and was elected to the more conservative Delaware Constitutional Convention of 1776 and to the first State House for the 1776/77 session.

In July 1777 Cook was named one of the associate justices of the new State Supreme Court. Before he was allowed to take office, however, the appointment was blocked and David Finney, the cousin of Thomas McKean, was given the seat. At the height of the American Revolution, no one lukewarm to the cause would be able to get such a position easily.

Regardless, he was popular enough in Kent County to be elected again to the House of Assembly for the 1778/79 session, and in the 1780/81 session he began a term in the Legislative Council, later known as the State Senate. Cook was Speaker in the 1782/83 session when President John Dickinson resigned, thereby becoming President of Delaware himself. His succession was controversial, however, and was not generally agreed to until he agreed to serve only until a special election could be held to select a president. He served as president from November 4, 1782, until February 1, 1783, when the special election was held. He was back in the State House for a term in 1783/84, and again in 1786/87, and finished his legislative career with two years in the Legislative Council, beginning with the 1787/88 session. He was still in office when he died.

During his tenure as president the noted loyalist Cheney Clow was brought to trial for treason. The trial was presided over by two ardent revolutionaries, William Killen and David Finney. During the proceedings Clow was able to produce papers to prove his claim to have had a British commission and the jury acquitted him. In spite of this his enemies insisted on continuing to hold him in prison for reimbursement of damages caused.

Delaware General Assembly (sessions while President)
| Year | Assembly | Senate majority | Speaker | House majority | Speaker |
|---|---|---|---|---|---|
| 1782/83 | 7th | non-partisan | John Cook | non-partisan | Simon Kollock |

== Death and legacy ==
Cook died at Duck Creek, now Smyrna, and was buried there in an unmarked grave at St. Peter's Episcopal Church Cemetery. His daughter, Sarah, married future Governor John Clark.

No known portrait of John Cook exists.

== Almanac ==
Elections were held October 1 and members of the General Assembly took office on October 20 or the following weekday. The State Legislative Council was created in 1776 and its Legislative Councilmen had a three-year term. State Assemblymen had a one-year term. The whole General Assembly chose the State President for a three-year term. The county sheriff also had a three-year term. However, Cook served as State President only temporarily, filling the vacancy created by the resignation of John Dickinson and awaiting the selection of a successor by the General Assembly.

Public offices
| Office | Type | Location | Began office | Ended office | Notes |
|---|---|---|---|---|---|
| Sheriff | Judiciary | Dover | 1772 | 1778 | Kent County |
| Delegate | Convention | Dover | August 27, 1776 | September 20, 1776 | State Constitution |
| Assemblyman | Legislature | New Castle | October 20, 1776 | October 20, 1777 | |
| Assemblyman | Legislature | Dover | October 20, 1778 | October 20, 1779 | |
| Councilman | Legislature | Dover | October 20, 1780 | November 4, 1782 | |
| State President | Executive | Dover | November 7, 1782 | February 1, 1783 | acting |
| Assemblyman | Legislature | Dover | October 20, 1783 | October 21, 1784 | |
| Assemblyman | Legislature | Dover | October 20, 1786 | October 21, 1787 | |
| Councilman | Legislature | Dover | October 20, 1787 | October 26, 1789 | |

Delaware General Assembly service
| Dates | Assembly | Chamber | Majority | Governor | Committees | District |
|---|---|---|---|---|---|---|
| 1776/77 | 1st | State House | non-partisan | John McKinly | | Kent at-large |
| 1778/79 | 3rd | State House | non-partisan | Caesar Rodney | | Kent at-large |
| 1780/81 | 5th | State Council | non-partisan | Caesar Rodney | | Kent at-large |
| 1781/82 | 6th | State Council | non-partisan | Caesar Rodney | | Kent at-large |
| 1782/83 | 7th | State Council | non-partisan | Nicholas Van Dyke | Speaker | Kent at-large |
| 1783/84 | 8th | State House | non-partisan | Nicholas Van Dyke | | Kent at-large |
| 1786/87 | 11th | State House | non-partisan | Thomas Collins | Speaker | Kent at-large |
| 1787/88 | 12th | State Council | non-partisan | Thomas Collins | | Kent at-large |
| 1788/89 | 13th | State Council | non-partisan | Thomas Collins | | Kent at-large |

Political offices
| Preceded by John Dickinson | President of Delaware; 1782–1783 | Succeeded by Nicholas Van Dyke |
