= Nicholas Van Dyke (politician, born 1738) =

American Founding Father and politician

7th President of Delaware
- In office February 1, 1783 – October 26, 1786
- Preceded by: John Cook
- Succeeded by: Thomas Collins

Continental Congressman from Delaware
- In office February 22, 1777 – February 2, 1782

Personal details
- Born: September 25, 1738 New Castle County, Delaware Colony, British America
- Died: February 19, 1789 (aged 50) New Castle County, Delaware, U.S.
- Resting place: Immanuel Episcopal Churchyard, New Castle
- Spouse(s): Elizabeth Nixon; Charlotte Stanley
- Profession: Lawyer

Nicholas Van Dyke (September 25, 1738 – February 19, 1789) was an American Founding Father, lawyer, and politician from New Castle in New Castle County, Delaware. He served in the Delaware General Assembly, in the Continental Congress, where he signed the Articles of Confederation, and as president of Delaware.

== Early life and family ==
Van Dyke was born at Berwick, his family's home in St. George's Hundred, New Castle County, Delaware, near the present location of Delaware City. He was the son of Nicholas and Rachael Alee Van Dyke, whose father, Andrew Van Dyke, had moved there from Long Island in New York in 1704. Young Nicholas was educated at home, then read law in Philadelphia where he was admitted to the Pennsylvania Bar in 1765.

Van Dyke returned to New Castle where he lived with his family and began a law practice. He married twice, first in 1766 to Elizabeth Nixon who died in 1770, two weeks after the birth of their son Nicholas. After her death he married Charlotte Stanley. They made their home in New Castle and had several more children. They were members of Immanuel Episcopal Church.

== Professional and political career ==
Van Dyke entered political life in 1774 as a member of the Boston Relief Committee in Delaware. He then was a member of the Delaware Constitutional Convention of 1776 and served in the State Council for two years beginning with the 1776–77 session. That same year he was appointed judge of Delaware's Admiralty Court, and on February 22, 1777, he was elected to the Continental Congress to replace John Evans who had declined to serve. He remained in Congress through 1781 and signed the Articles of Confederation for Delaware. For five sessions, from 1778–79 until he became president of Delaware in 1783, he served in the State House and was the speaker in the 1780–81 session.

A few months after John Dickinson resigned as president of Delaware in 1782, the Delaware General Assembly held a special vote to choose a successor to the conservative President John Cook. The conservative faction tried to elect John McKinly, who had been the first president, but the Patriot faction won by electing Van Dyke. He took office February 1, 1783, and served until October 27, 1786.

It was during his tenure as president of Delaware that the American Revolution officially ended with the signing of the Treaty of Paris in September 1783. In an attempt to solve one problem resulting from the war, Van Dyke proposed and carried out a plan to pay Delaware's portion of the war debt. Another difficult unresolved war problem was the fate of Loyalist Cheney Clow. Arrested in 1778, tried for and acquitted of treason in 1782, he was then charged with the murder of a member of the posse sent to capture him in 1778. Though there was no evidence that Clow actually killed the man, in May 1783 a jury convicted him and sentenced him to death. Unable politically to pardon Clow, but aware that many responsible people, including Caesar Rodney's brother, Thomas Rodney, believed the man innocent, Van Dyke postponed the execution indefinitely.

Van Dyke returned to the State Senate for single session tenures in 1786–87 and briefly until his death in the 1788–89 session, when he was the speaker.

Delaware General Assembly (sessions while President)
Year	Assembly	Senate majority	Speaker	House majority	Speaker
1782–83	7th	non-partisan	John Cook	non-partisan	vacant
1783–84	8th	non-partisan	Caesar Rodney	non-partisan	Robert Bryan
1784–85	9th	non-partisan	Thomas McDonough	non-partisan	Thomas Duff
1785–86	10th	non-partisan	Thomas McDonough	non-partisan	Thomas Duff

== Death and legacy ==
Van Dyke died at Berwick and was buried there. Later his remains were removed to the Immanuel Episcopal Church Cemetery at New Castle.

His son, also Nicholas, later represented Delaware in the U.S. House and U.S. Senate. His daughter, Nancy Ann, married Kensey Johns at a 1784 wedding in the Amstel House in New Castle that was attended by General George Washington. Their son, Kensey Johns Jr., would later serve in the U.S. House.

Much of the property surrounding Van Dyke's original home Berwick was taken in 1829 for the Chesapeake & Delaware Canal, but the house remained through the American Civil War. All the remaining lands and home are believed to have been taken when the canal was expanded in 1929. His New Castle home, now known as the Amstel House, still stands on Fourth Street in New Castle and is open to the public.

No known portrait of Nicholas Van Dyke exists.

== Almanac ==
Elections were held October 1 and members of the General Assembly took office on October 20 or the following weekday. State Legislative Councilmen had a three-year term and State Assemblymen had a one-year term. The whole General Assembly chose the Continental Congressmen for a one-year term and it chose the State President for a three-year term.

Public Offices
Office	Type	Location	Began office	Ended office	notes
Delegate	Convention	Dover	August 27, 1776	September 20, 1776	State Constitution
Councilman	Legislature	New Castle	October 20, 1776	October 20, 1778	
Delegate	Legislature	Philadelphia	February 22, 1777	March 1, 1781	Continental Congress
Delegate	Legislature	Philadelphia	March 1, 1781	November 3, 1781	Continental Congress
Delegate	Legislature	Philadelphia	November 3, 1781	February 2, 1782	Continental Congress
Assemblyman	Legislature	Dover	October 20, 1778	October 20, 1779	
Assemblyman	Legislature	Dover	October 20, 1779	October 20, 1780	
Assemblyman	Legislature	Dover	October 20, 1780	October 20, 1781	
Assemblyman	Legislature	Dover	October 20, 1781	October 20, 1782	
Assemblyman	Legislature	Dover	October 20, 1782	February 1, 1783	
State President	Executive	Dover	February 1, 1783	October 26, 1786	
Councilman	Legislature	Dover	October 20, 1786	October 21, 1787	
Councilman	Legislature	Dover	October 20, 1788	February 19, 1789	

Delaware General Assembly service
Dates	Assembly	Chamber	Majority	Governor	Committees	District
1776–77	1st	State Council	non-partisan	John McKinly		New Castle at-large
1777–78	2nd	State Council	non-partisan	George Read		New Castle at-large
1778–79	3rd	State House	non-partisan	Caesar Rodney		New Castle at-large
1779–80	4th	State House	non-partisan	Caesar Rodney		New Castle at-large
1780–81	5th	State House	non-partisan	Caesar Rodney		New Castle at-large
1781–82	6th	State House	non-partisan	John Dickinson		New Castle at-large
1782–83	7th	State House	non-partisan	John Cook	Speaker	New Castle at-large
1786–87	11th	State Council	non-partisan	Thomas Collins		New Castle at-large
1787–88	12th	State Council	non-partisan	Thomas Collins		New Castle at-large
1788–89	13th	State Council	non-partisan	Thomas Collins		New Castle at-large

Political offices
Preceded by John Cook	President of Delaware; 1783–1786	Succeeded by Thomas Collins
