= Erik Björck =

Clergyman (1668–1740) in Delaware and Sweden

Magister Erik Björck
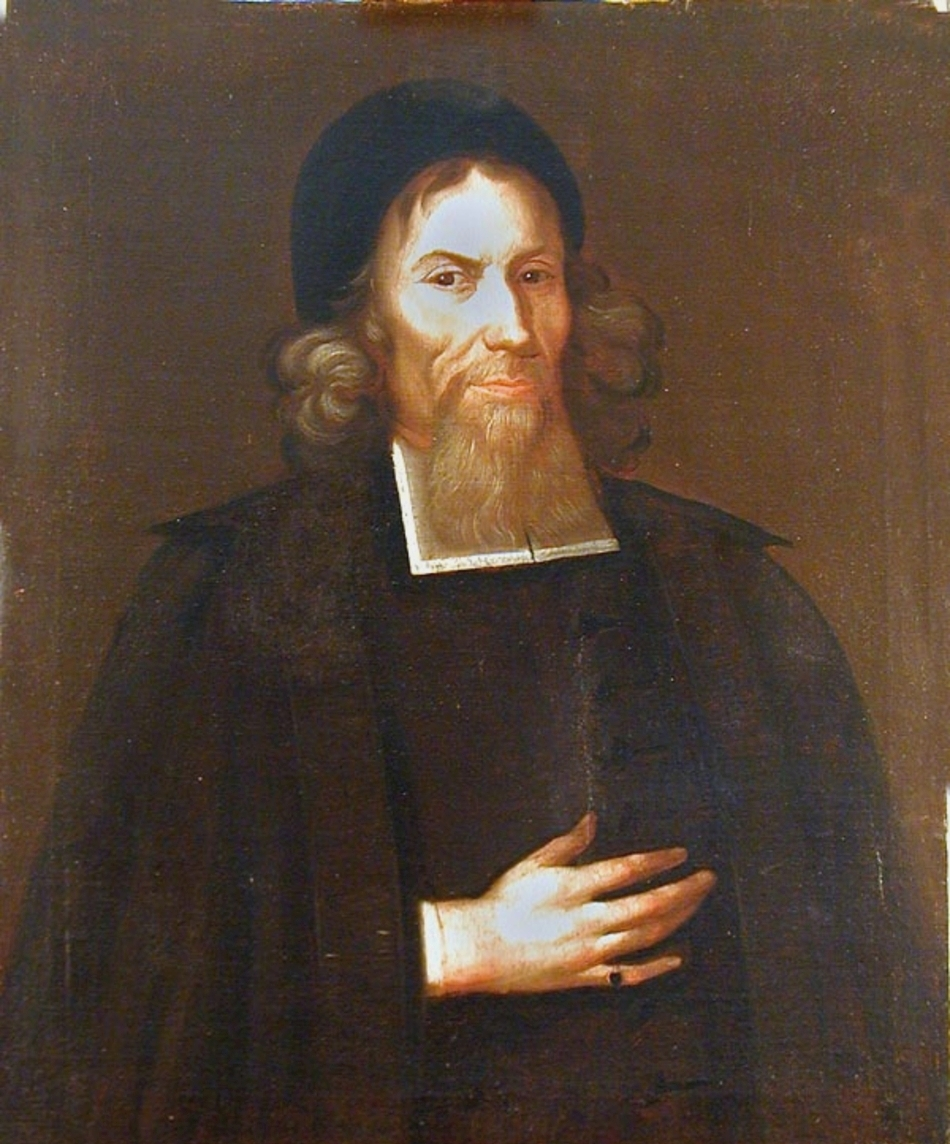
- Born: Erik Björck; January 13, 1668; Köping, Sweden
- Died: August 21, 1740 (aged 72); Falun, Sweden
- Education: Uppsala University
- Occupation: Minister
- Parent(s): Tobias Andreæ Björck; Magdalena Rudelia

Ecclesiastical career
- Religion: Lutheranism
- Church: Church of Sweden
- Ordained: May 11, 1696
- Congregations: Holy Trinity Church (1696-1713); Falu Kristine, Stora Kopparberg and Aspeboda (1713-1740).
- Offices held: Provost of the Swedish Lutheran congregations in America (1711-1713)
- Title: Filosofie magister 1721

Notes
- Signature of Eric Björck, from the 14 October 1699 church book of the Christiana Church, Crane Hook, New Sweden

Erik Björck (born January 13, 1668, in Köping, died August 21, 1740, in Falun), was a Swedish clergyman. He was active in the former Swedish colony on the Delaware from 1697 to 1714, and then until his death in 1740 as parish priest in Falun.

== Early life ==
Erik Björck's father was the Rector Scholæ in Köping, later the parish priest of Björskog, Tobias Andreæ Björck who died in 1683 at the age of 55, leaving his wife and children in poverty; his mother was Magdalena Rudelia, daughter of the parish priest of Munktorp Ericus Andreæ Sala-Montanus.

With meager resources, Björck went through Trivial school and Gymnasium in Västerås, but got a good place as a tutor for the son and nephews of Jesper Swedberg when he began his studies at Uppsala University in 1687. The position was crucial for his future. Surrounded by Quakers and Calvinists the Swedish Lutherans in America wrote to the old country asking for herders to keep their flock together. Swedberg persuaded King Charles XI of Sweden to heed their plea, and the King in 1696 ordered the Archbishop of Uppsala to appoint two or three suitable clergymen for America. The choice fell primarily on Andreas Rudman, and next to him was Swedberg's proposal Björck. They were joined by a third theologian, Jonas Aurén, whose actual task was to bring home more detailed information about the distant land. Equipped with funds and a large shipment of religious literature intended for distribution, the young clergymen set sail in August 1696 from Sweden.

== The years in America ==
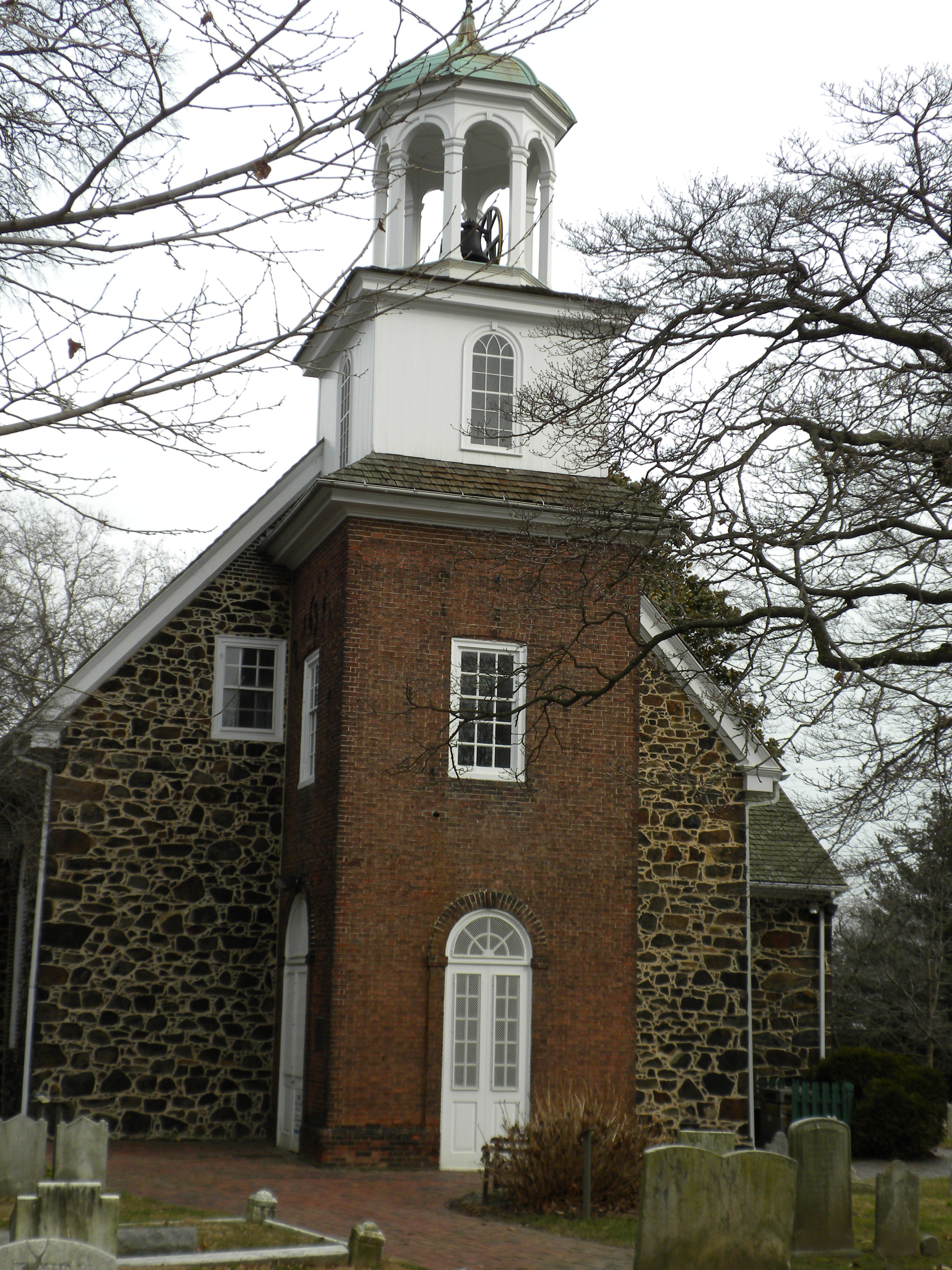
Holy Trinity church in Wilmington.

After a lengthy stay in London, in order to receive King William III of England's permission for the undertaking, Björck and his associates landed in the New World on June 4, 1697. Courtesly received by the governor of Maryland, they proceeded to Philadelphia where they paid their respects to the deputy governor. Between them, the tasks were distributed in such a way that Björck was responsible for the area around present-day Wilmington, Rudman was responsible for the area around present-day Philadelphia and Aurén was to devote himself to missions among the American Indians. Björck quickly took up his duties in the congregation in Crane Hook. May 28, 1698, the foundation of a new stone church was laid which was consecrated on 4 July 1699, as a replacement for a dilapidated wooden church. The church was consecrated on Trinity Sunday and was therefore called Holy Trinity church. The Anglican clergy originally met the new Swedish Lutheran clergymen with distrust and doubts about their orthodoxy concerning predestination and communion, but the Lutherans and the Anglicans soon became close associates; preaching in each other's churches, and the Swedes participating in the meetings of the local Anglican synod.

Björck found his wife among the congregation and told in a letter to Sweden: My particular condition is so far changed, that the child of a prominent man of my congregation, now in her 16th year, Kristina Stalcop called, through her honorable actions and extraordinary wit in all kinds of things has at last bound my mind to her [...]. His wife belonged to a respectable and well-to-do family of Swedish origin, and he found in her relatives good support. In his associate Andreas Rudman, Björck had a trusted friend until his death in 1708, just as he became a close friend of Andreas Sandel, who in 1702 replaced the sickly Rudman. Jonas Aurén failed in his mission to spread Christianity among the Conestoga and joined a Seventh-day Sabbatarian group. In 1711, Björck was appointed provost and overseer of the Swedish congregations in America by Jesper Swedberg, who was then bishop of Skara and in charge of the Swedish Lutheran congregations in America.

== Returning to Sweden ==
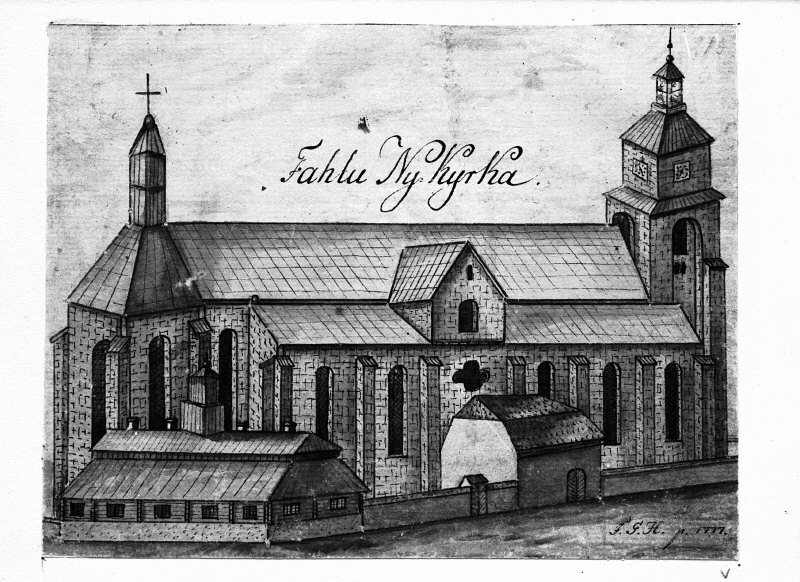
Falu Kristine church as it looked like when Björck was parish priest there.

On May 23, 1713, Björck was appointed parish priest in Falun by King Charles XII. He and his family left Wilmington on June 29, 1714. Besides his wife, the company contained his son Tobias, his daughters Magdalena, Katarina and Kristina, his wife's cousin Anna Stedham and sister Maria Stalcop and her husband Johan van der Weer, besides the orphan child Anna Stedham. After a visit to Jesper Swedberg in Skara, Björck and family arrived in Falun, December 8, 1714. He gave his first sermon in Kristine Church on the third Sunday in Advent 1714. He was installed by bishop in 1717 and was appointed filosofie magister on April 1, 1721. His wife died in 1720 and in 1722 he married Sara Elvia, daughter of the provost Gustav Johan Elvius of Rättvik, who died just three years later.

During his time as parish priest, Björck came to pursue the issue of Sabbath peace in his parishes. In a sermon in 1725, he complained about the desecration of the Sabbath with travel and household chores, with trade and wandering, with shouting and swarming in taverns and alehouses. His complaints prompted the governor to arrange stricter vigilance in Falun on Sundays and holidays. Through his influence, Stora Kopparbergs Bergslag in 1718 presented to Christina Church a large chalice in silver together with a paten and a pyx in gilt silver. Until 1736, Björck had only one curate although he served three congregations and when old age made him request an additional, he wrote: I never have a Sunday off, not to write or preach in either church. In particular, he considered the service in Aspeboda church outside town to be burdensome. He died on August 21, 1740. Andreas Sandel, then parish priest in Hedemora, officiated at the funeral.
