= Springer Hoax =

Genealogy

The Springer Hoax was a scam starting in the mid 19th century, often using a phony genealogy in various ways to collect money based on the supposed estate of prominent colonialist Charles (Carl Christopher) Springer and debts said to be owed to him by various government agencies of Wilmington, Delaware, and Stockholm, Sweden. The alleged estate was said to include 1,900 acres of land, 228 acres of which ran through the center of Wilmington, worth up to $150,000,000. Other claims included $100,000,000 deposited in a Stockholm bank. It is notable today primarily as the result of mistaken reliance on the various fraudulent and/or erroneous Springer genealogies going back to Adam and Eve via Emperor Charlemagne.

Wilmington's supposed debt was related to land purportedly owned by Springer. The land actually had belonged to Old Swedes' Church. Springer was merely a life trustee for the land. The tie to Sweden was based on a phony genealogy used to claim that Springer was part of the Swedish aristocracy.

In one version of the scam from the 1850s, people claiming to be Springer heirs sold stock in the "Springer Heirs Corporation", supposedly to file court cases to prove their alleged ownership of large sections of real estate in the downtown area of Wilmington, Delaware or the royal jewels of Sweden. The corporation folded after a few minor court cases for several small, unclaimed estates.

A later version of the scam was started in 1913, targeting actual and possible descendants of Springer. Again, the estate was said to hold legitimate title to large sections of land in Wilmington. Victims were enticed into buying shares in the "Springer Heirs Corporation 1913 U.S. American and Canada".

When indicted for charges of larceny, several perpetrators of the scam claimed that their story was essentially true and the truth was being hidden by a conspiracy involving the courts, the government of Wilmington, and the Old Swedes' Church.
