= Oldest buildings =

Wikipedia has several lists of oldest buildings:

- List of the oldest buildings in the world
- Oldest buildings in Canada by province or territory
  - List of oldest buildings and structures in Toronto
- List of oldest buildings and structures in Macau
- Oldest buildings in the United Kingdom
  - Oldest buildings in Scotland
- Oldest buildings in the United States
  - List of the oldest buildings in Connecticut
  - List of the oldest buildings in Delaware
  - List of the oldest buildings in Massachusetts
  - List of the oldest buildings in New Jersey
  - List of the oldest buildings in New York
  - List of the oldest buildings in Pennsylvania
  - List of the oldest buildings in Rhode Island
  - List of the oldest buildings in Virginia

== See also ==
- List of the oldest churches in the United States
- List of the oldest churches in the world
- List of the oldest mosques in the world
- Oldest synagogues in the world
