= Town Point =

Town Point may refer to:

- Spencers Wharf, Maryland, a hamlet formerly named Town Point
- Town Point (Dover, Delaware), listed on the National Register of Historic Places in Kent County, Delaware

== See also ==
- Town Point Park, a park in Norfolk, Virginia
