= Dutch House (New Castle, Delaware) =

Historic home

Coordinates: 39.6609°N 75.5634°W

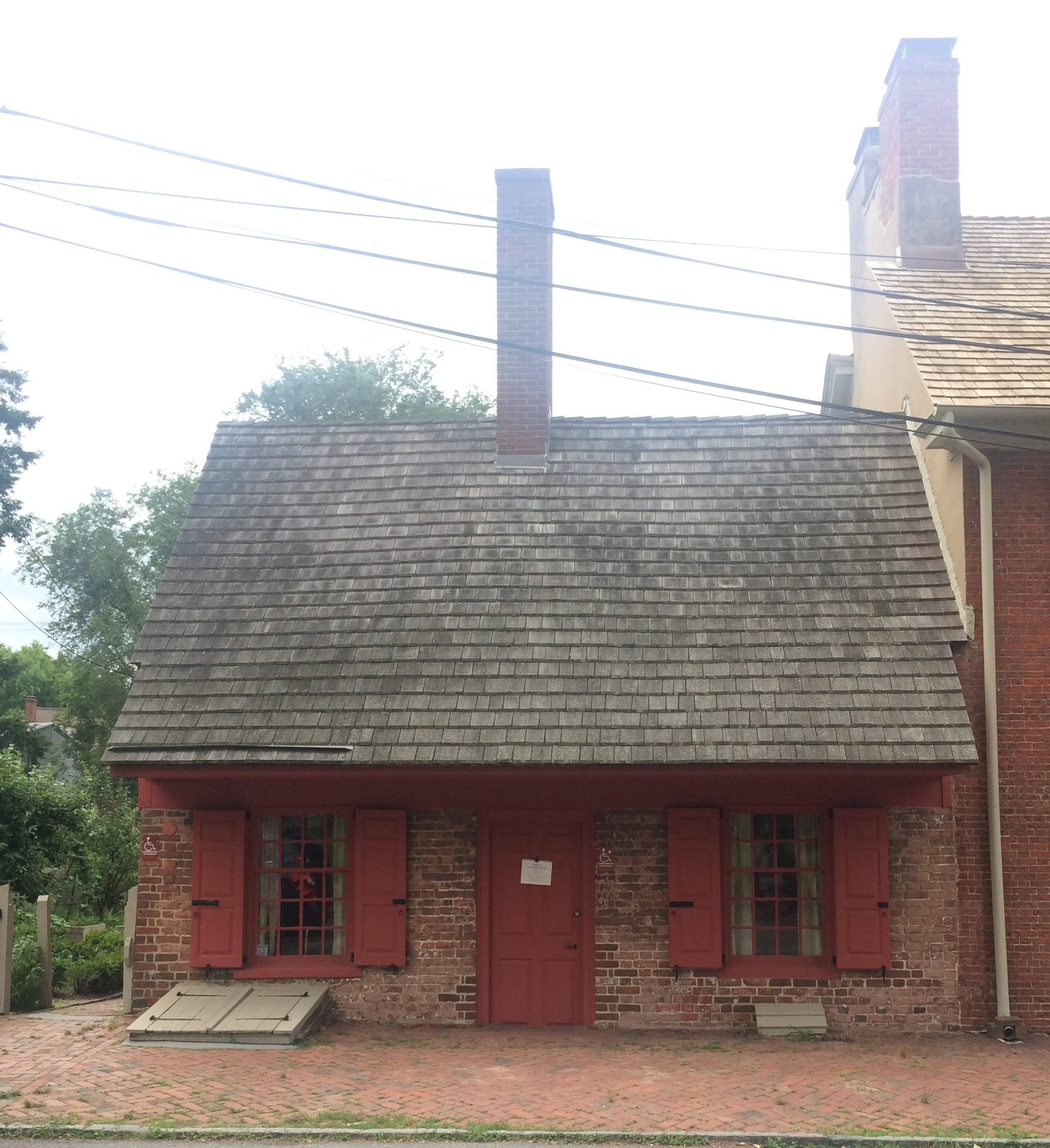
The Dutch House in New Castle, possibly the oldest building in the state of Delaware

The Dutch House is a late-17th-century house in New Castle in the U.S. state of Delaware. Built during New Castle's colonial period, it is considered one of the oldest houses in the state. The house has been used for various purposes throughout its history, including as a rental property, storehouse, and historic house museum. The Dutch House is currently managed by the New Castle Historical Society.

== History ==
The earliest records of any building on the property refer to "George Moore's log house" in the early 1680s. The current structure is believed to have been built in the late 17th century in the Federal period and has a distinct brick exterior. The interior of the house features both Dutch and English building traditions, with decorative finishes and exposed ceiling beams. It is often contested whether the Dutch House or the Ryves Holt House is the oldest house in the state of Delaware. Although the house is recorded as being built for a Dutch family, it was built using English methods during the English occupation (1663–1673) of the colony; this was not discovered until the house was undergoing restoration.

The house is located across the street from the New Castle town green, and its doorstep is located below street level on account of the street's having been raised in the mid-18th century. It was at this time that a cellar was excavated and three sides of the house were wrapped in a brick exterior. In 1823, a full second floor was added, and the house was remodeled in the Federal style.

In the late 19th century, the house was rented out and used as a storehouse for the Immanuel Episcopal Church.

The house was privately owned until 1937, when it was purchased by the Delaware Society for the Preservation of Antiquities who had it restored and put under the management of the New Castle Historical Society. Today, the Dutch House is open to the public as a museum.

== See also ==
- List of the oldest buildings in Delaware
