= Ryves Holt House =

Building in Delaware, United States

Coordinates: 38.775922°N 75.140992°W

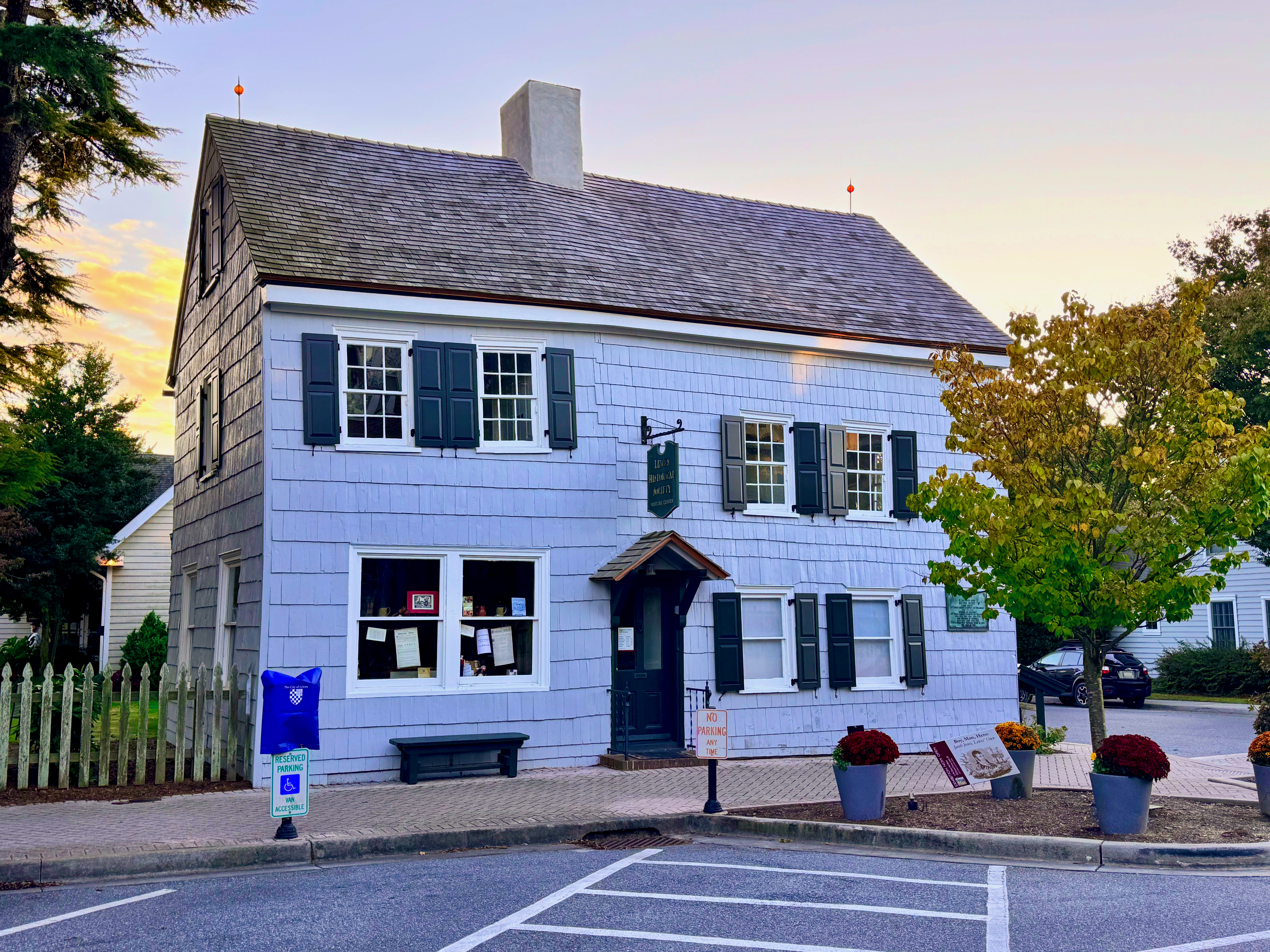
The Ryves Holt House in 2023.

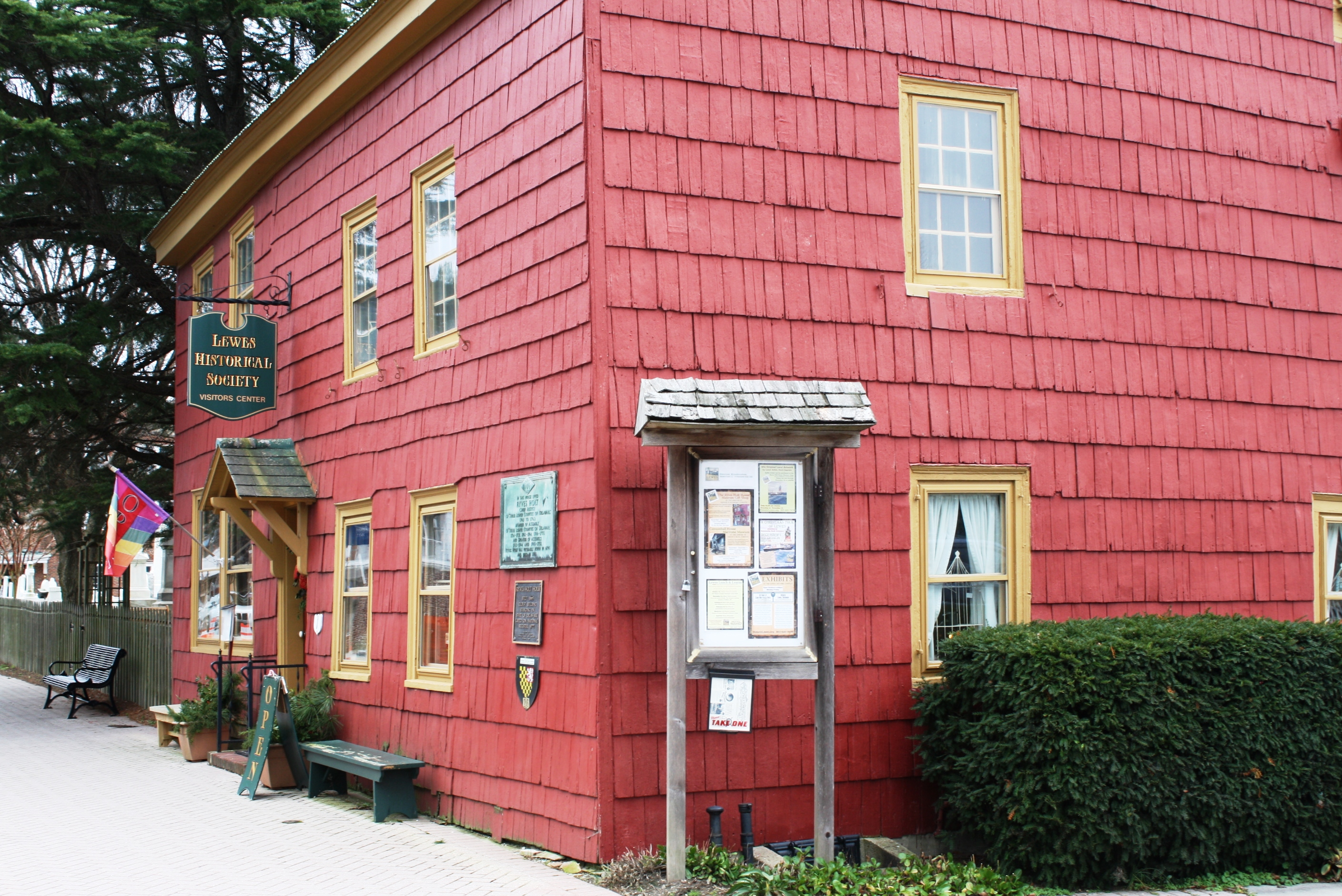
Ryves Holt House

Ryves Holt House (1680) is purportedly the oldest surviving house in the U.S. state of Delaware. It is located at 218 Second Street in Lewes, Delaware.

The building, which has been dated to 1680 using dendrochronology, served as one of the earliest inns in the region. It was run for a time as an ordinary by Philip Russell, who was "recorded as a cupbearer to William Penn". After coming to "Port Lewes" in 1721, Ryves Holt, the first Chief Justice of Sussex County, purchased the house. The Lewes Historical Society currently owns and operates the building. On December 30, 2014, the Ryves Holt House was added to the First State National Historical Park.

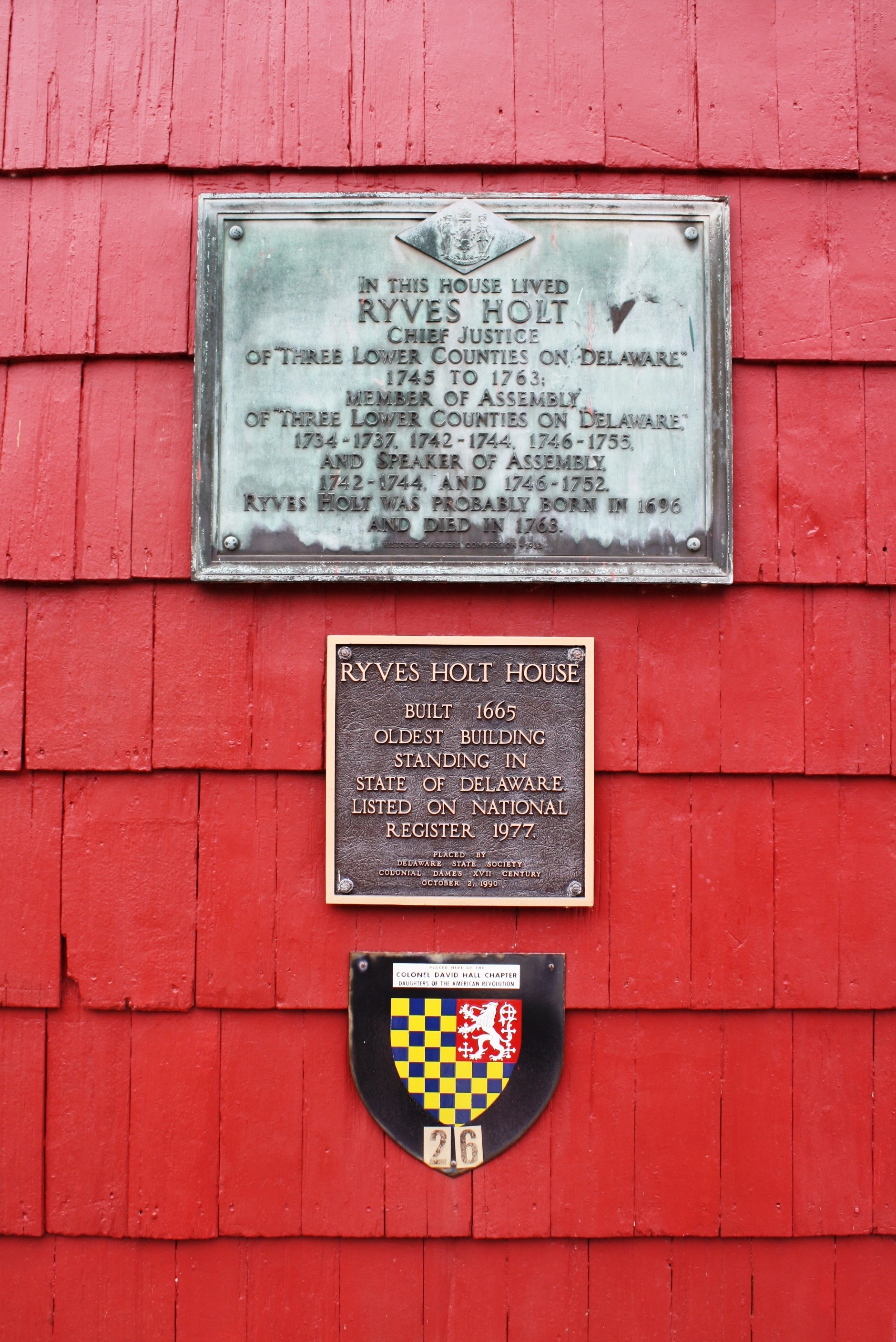
Ryves Holt House

== See also ==
- List of the oldest buildings in Delaware
