= Holy Trinity Church (Old Swedes) =

Church in Wilmington, Delaware

- Holy Trinity (Old Swedes) Church
- U.S. National Register of Historic Places
- U.S. National Historic Landmark
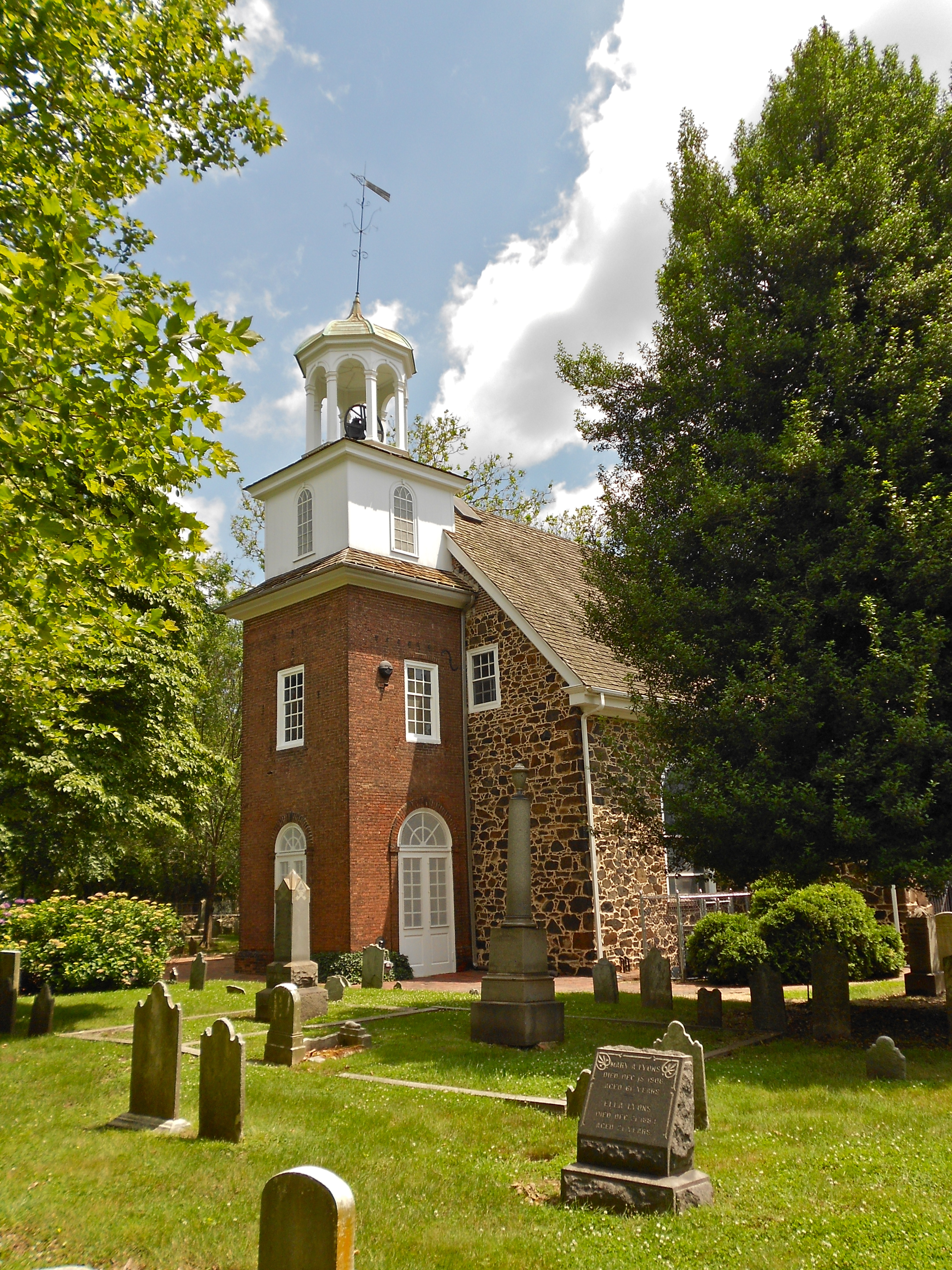
- Holy Trinity Church (Old Swedes) in June 2013

- Location within Delaware Location within the United States
- Location: E. 7th St. and Church St., Wilmington, Delaware
- Coordinates: 39°44′18.7″N 75°32′26.0″W
- Built: 1698
- NRHP reference No.: 66000261

Significant dates
- Added to NRHP: October 15, 1966
- Designated NHL: November 5, 1961

Holy Trinity Church, also known as Old Swedes, is a historic church at East 7th and Church Street in Wilmington, Delaware. It was consecrated on Trinity Sunday, June 4, 1699, by a predominantly Swedish congregation formerly of the colony of New Sweden. The church is among the few surviving public buildings that reflect the Swedish colonial effort. It remains open for tours and religious activities. The church was designated a National Historic Landmark in 1961 and became part of First State National Historical Park in 2013. The church appears on the obverse of the 1937 Delaware Tercentenary half dollar.

The church reported 822 members in 2021 and 436 members in 2023; no membership statistics were reported in 2024 parochial reports. Plate and pledge income reported for the congregation in 2024 was $367,899 with average Sunday attendance (ASA) of 127 persons. This was a relative decrease from ASA of 200 reported in 2015.

== History ==
The church was built in 1698–99 in territory that had been the colony of New Sweden until 1655. The building materials were local blue granite and Swedish bricks that had been used as ship's ballast. The church is situated on the site of the Fort Christina's burial ground, which dates to 1638. The church claims to be "the nation's oldest church building still used for worship as originally built". There are reportedly over 15,000 burials in the churchyard. Lutheran church services were held in the Swedish language well into the 18th century.

John Hansson Steelman provided significant donations which enabled the construction of the church, including £320 for the purchase of land for the church at Fort Christina and for the building of the church: £220 by loans and £100 by gift. In return, he was promised that he and his wife would be buried within the church, which was not done, as they moved to Pennsylvania in the 1730s.

In 1697, the Church of Sweden renewed its commitment to Swedish settlers in the Delaware Valley and sent three missionaries, Jonas Auren, Eric Bjork, and Andreas Rudman, to the area. A total of three churches with similar architecture were built or established by Swedish communities in the area about the same time. All are generally known as "Old Swedes" and later joined the Episcopal Church. Gloria Dei (Old Swedes') Church in Philadelphia was founded in 1697 and the building was completed in 1700. Trinity Church in Swedesboro, New Jersey was founded in 1703, with its current building completed in 1784.

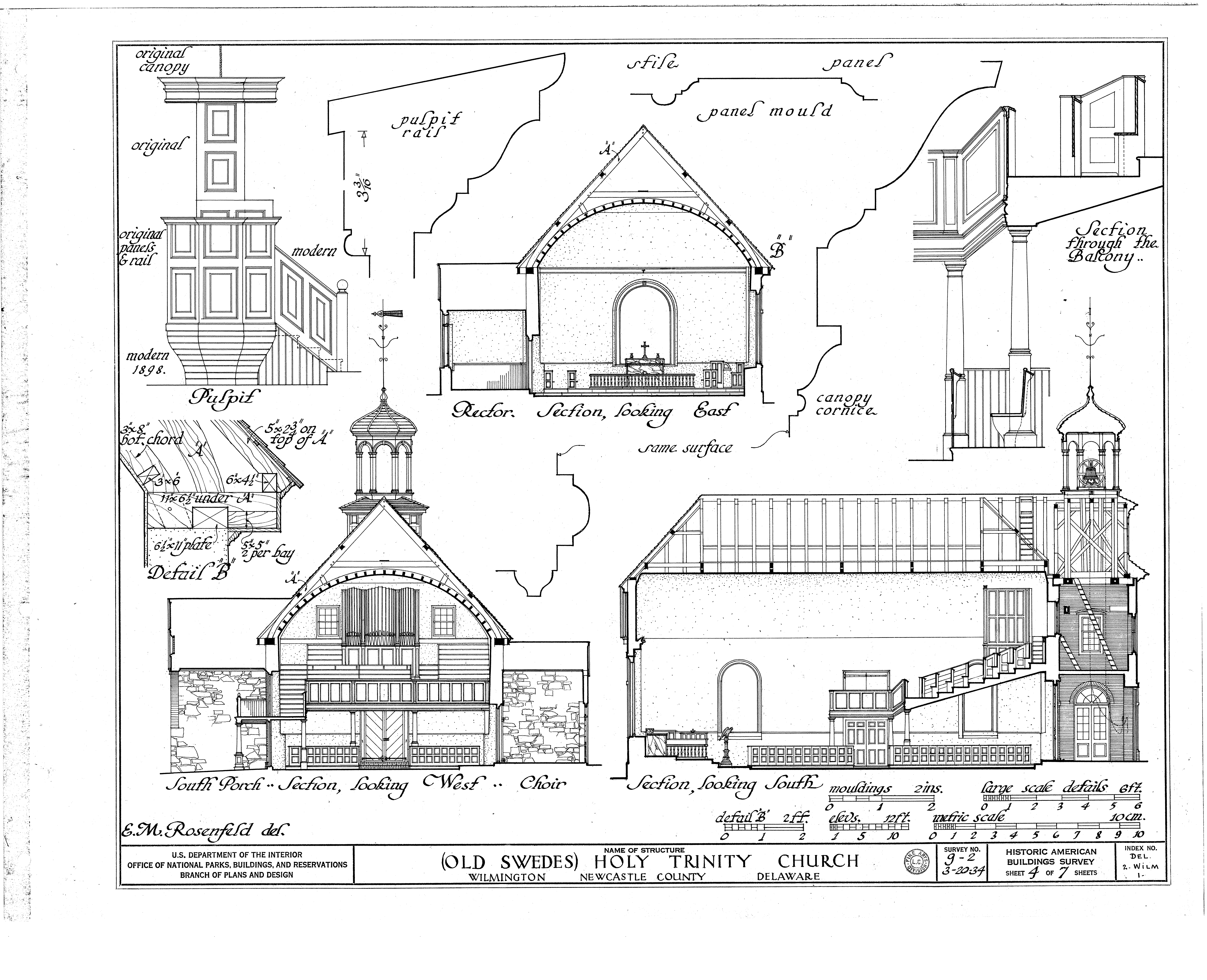
HABS architectural drawing of the church

Five other Swedish churches were founded in the 18th century: St. Mary Anne's Episcopal Church in North East, Maryland; Old St. Gabriel's Episcopal Church in Douglassville, Pennsylvania; St. George's Episcopal in Churchtown, New Jersey; St. James Kingsessing in Philadelphia; and Christ Church (Old Swedes) in Upper Merion Township, Pennsylvania.

Holy Trinity in Wilmington has housed an Episcopal parish since 1791 and is now part of the Episcopal Diocese of Delaware. An earlier church in New Sweden was built in Swanwyck, near New Castle about 1662, which was replaced by a combined church and fort at Crane Hook in 1667. In 1958, the historic Hendrickson House was moved to the grounds of the church. The church building was declared a National Historic Landmark in 1961. Trinity Parish operates two church buildings in Wilmington, both listed on the National Register of Historic Places: the main building on North Adams, and Old Swedes at East 7th and Church Streets.

== Burials in churchyard ==
Notable burials include:

- Alexis Irenee du Pont Bayard (1918–1985), lieutenant governor of Delaware
- Elizabeth Bradford du Pont Bayard (1880–1975)
- James A. Bayard (1799–1880), U.S. Senator
- James Asherton Bayard (1859–1919), secretary of Arizona Territory
- Richard Bayard (1796–1868), first mayor of Wilmington, U.S. Senator
- Thomas F. Bayard, Sr. (1828–1898), secretary of state under President Cleveland
- Thomas F. Bayard, Jr. (1868–1942), U.S. Senator
- Dr. Joseph Capelle, a Revolutionary War veteran
- Catharina and Britta Cock (d. 1726)
- Major Peter Jaquett, a Revolutionary War veteran
- The Right Reverend Alfred Lee, first bishop of the Episcopal Diocese of Delaware
- Ignatius Grubb (1841–1927), justice of the Delaware State Supreme Court.
- George R. McLane (1819–1855), American physician and politician
- Captain Hugh Montgomery, captain of the brig Nancy, raised the first American flag in a foreign port
- Elizabeth Montgomery, daughter of Captain Hugh Montgomery
- Hans Jurgen Smidt (1696-1753) and Mary Stalcop (1696-1750), ancestors of Devil Anse Hatfield of the Hatfield-McCoy feud.
- Carl Christopher Springer, first warden
- William Vandever (d. 1718), grave marked with the oldest legible stone
- Samuel White (1770–1809), U.S. Senator
- James Harrison Wilson (1837–1925) Union general in the Civil War
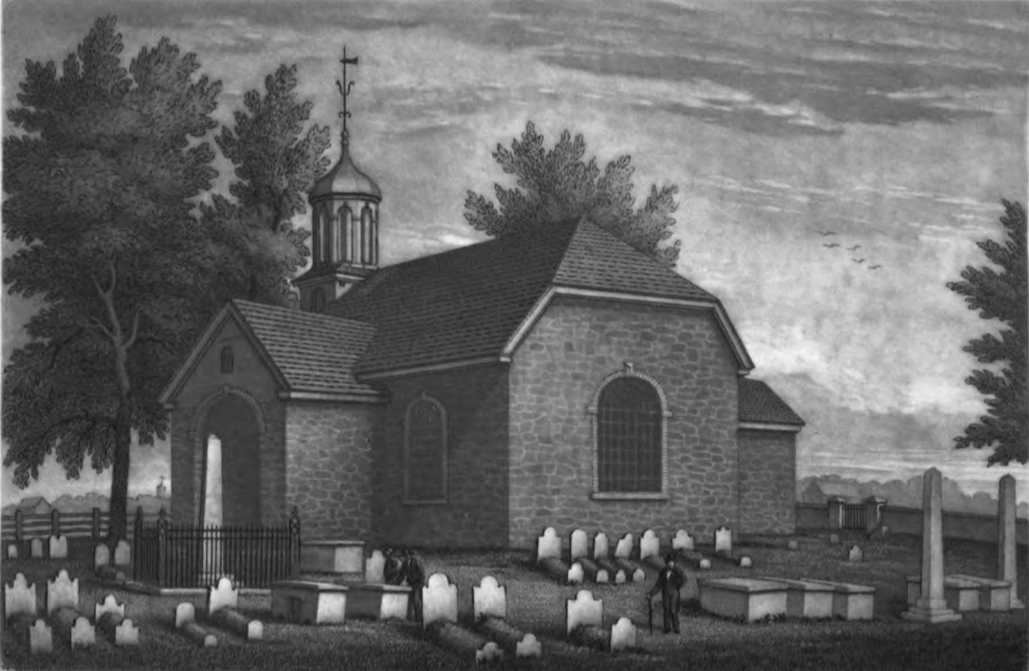
"Swede's Church" by John Sartain (1845)

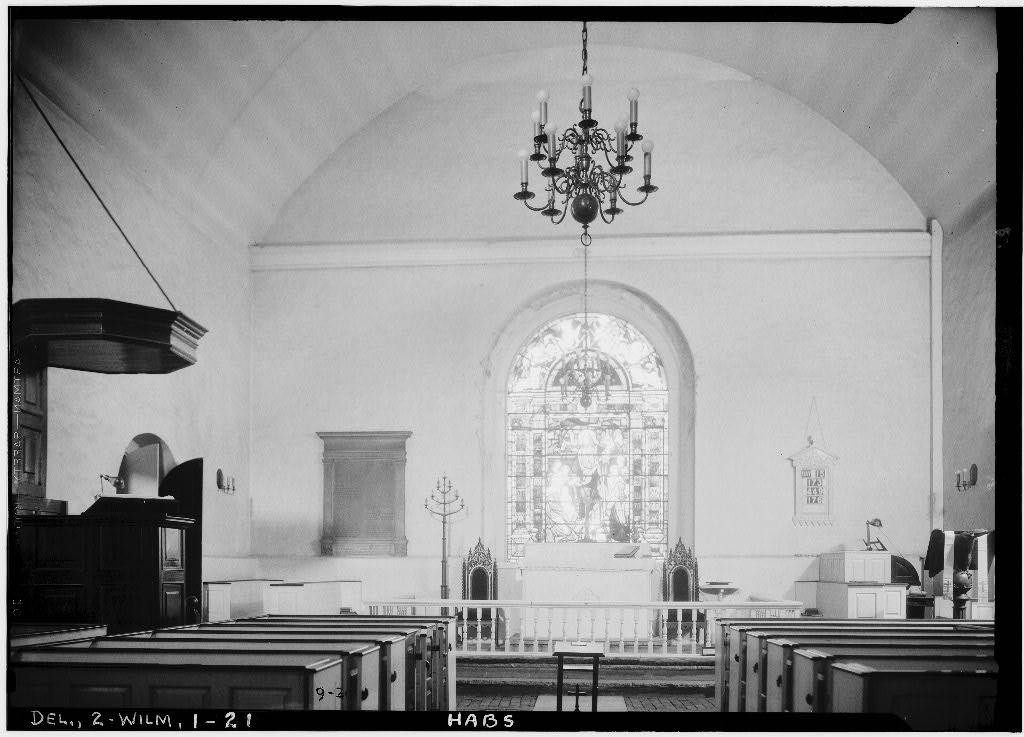
Interior of Old Swedes Church. From the Historic American Buildings Survey, Edward M. Rosenfeld, Photographer, April 20, 1934

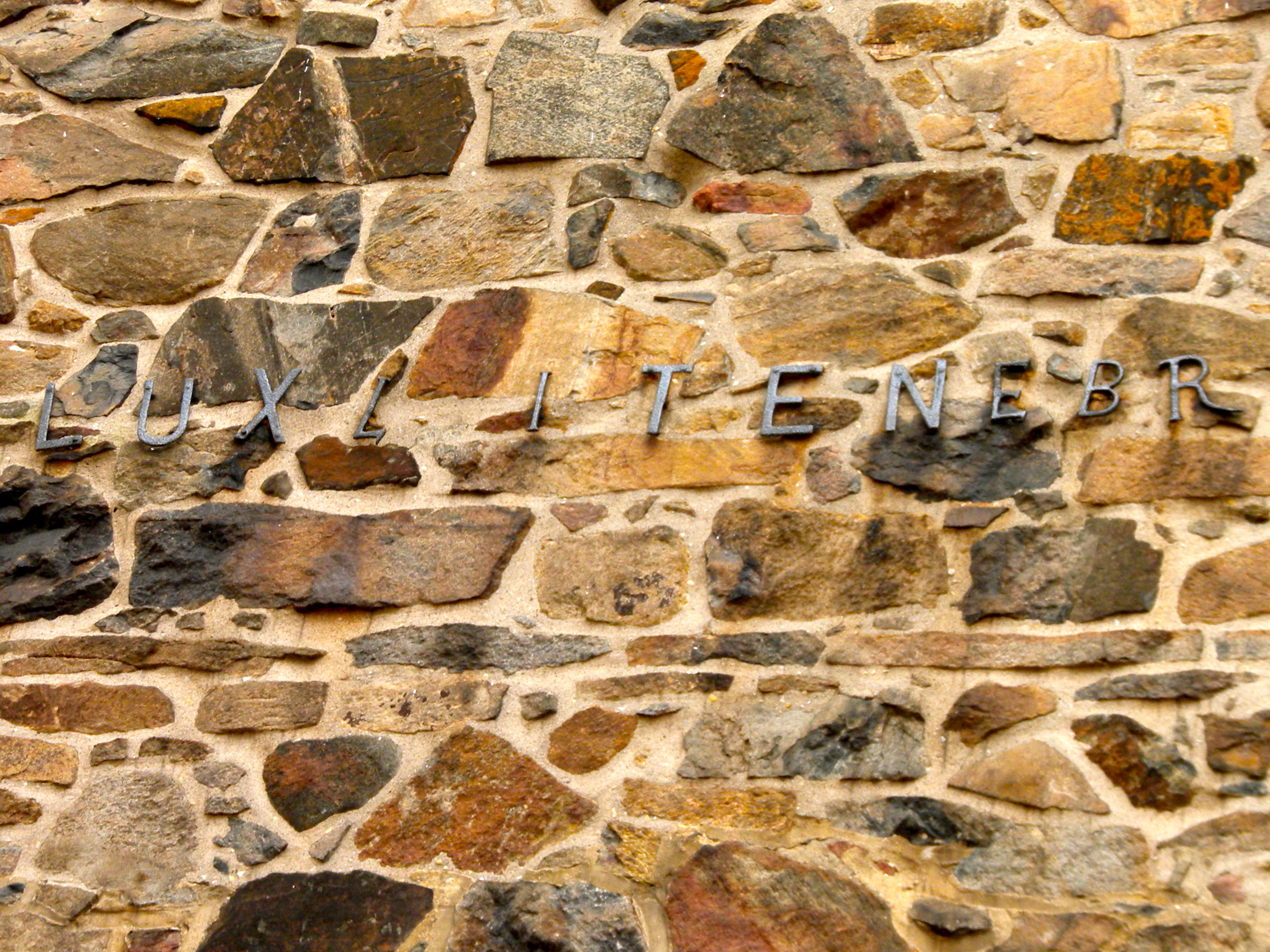
Iron letters on the east wall of the church dating from 1698, spelling in Latin "LUX-L.I. TENEBR ORIENS- EX ALTO" which translates to "Light from on high shines in the darkness"

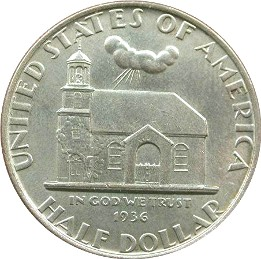
Old Swedes Church depicted on the 1937 Delaware Tercentenary half dollar

== See also ==
- National Register of Historic Places listings in Wilmington, Delaware
- List of National Historic Landmarks in Delaware
- List of the oldest buildings in Delaware
- List of cemeteries in Delaware
- Oldest churches in the United States
- Gloria Dei (Old Swedes') Church — in Philadelphia, Pennsylvania
