= First State National Historical Park =

National Park Service unit in Delaware and Pennsylvania, United States

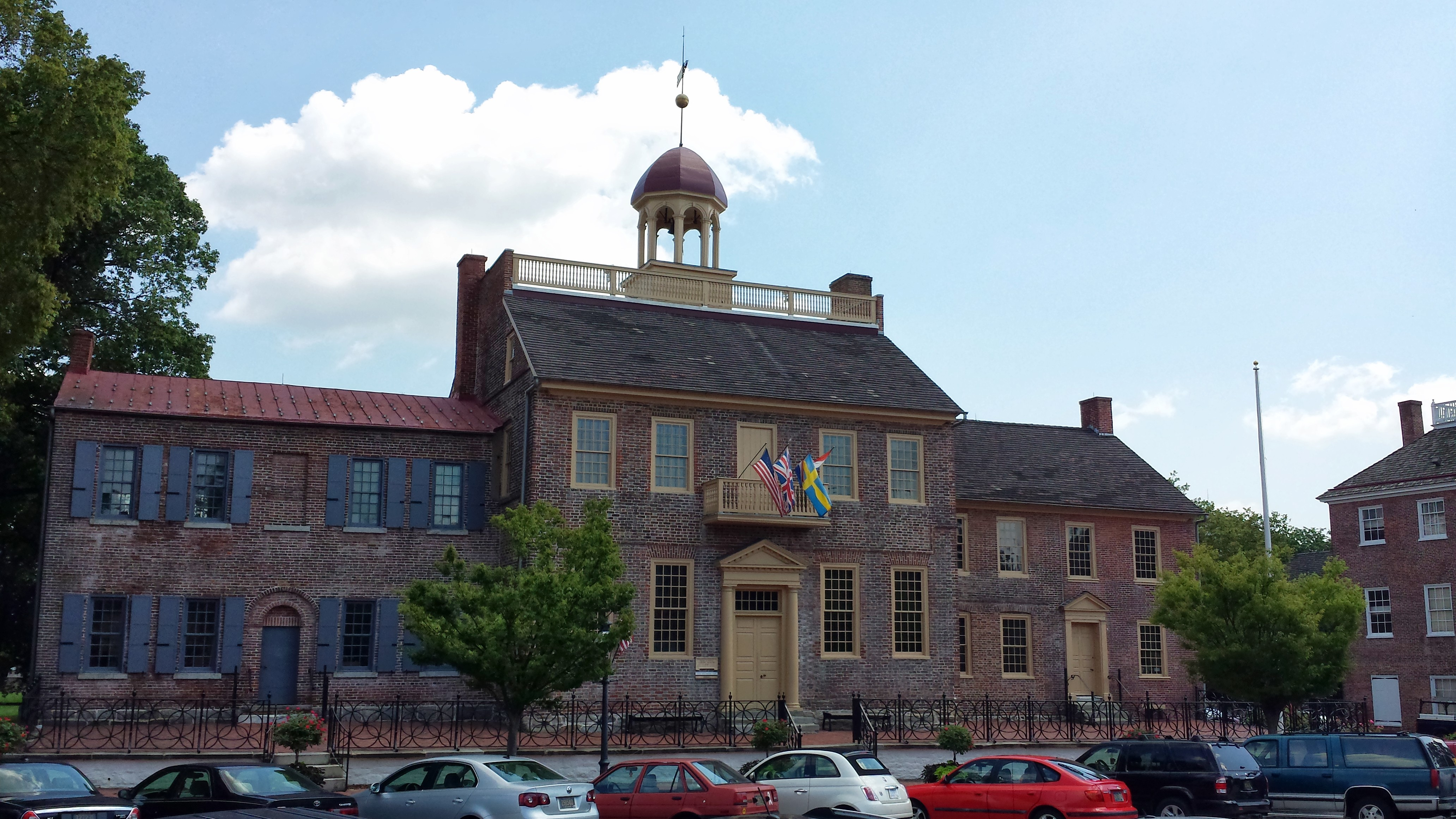
- New Castle Court House

- Location within Delaware Location within the United States
- Location: New Castle / Kent / Sussex counties, Delaware and Delaware County, Pennsylvania, United States
- Nearest city: Dover, Lewes, New Castle, and Wilmington, Delaware
- Coordinates: 39°39′53″N 75°33′55″W
- Created: March 25, 2013
- Visitors: 200,173 (in 2025)
- Governing body: National Park Service, State
- Website: First State National Historical Park

First State National Historical Park is a National Park Service unit which lies primarily in the state of Delaware but which extends partly into Pennsylvania in Chadds Ford. Initially created as First State National Monument by President Barack Obama under the Antiquities Act on March 25, 2013, the park was later redesignated as First State National Historical Park by Congress.

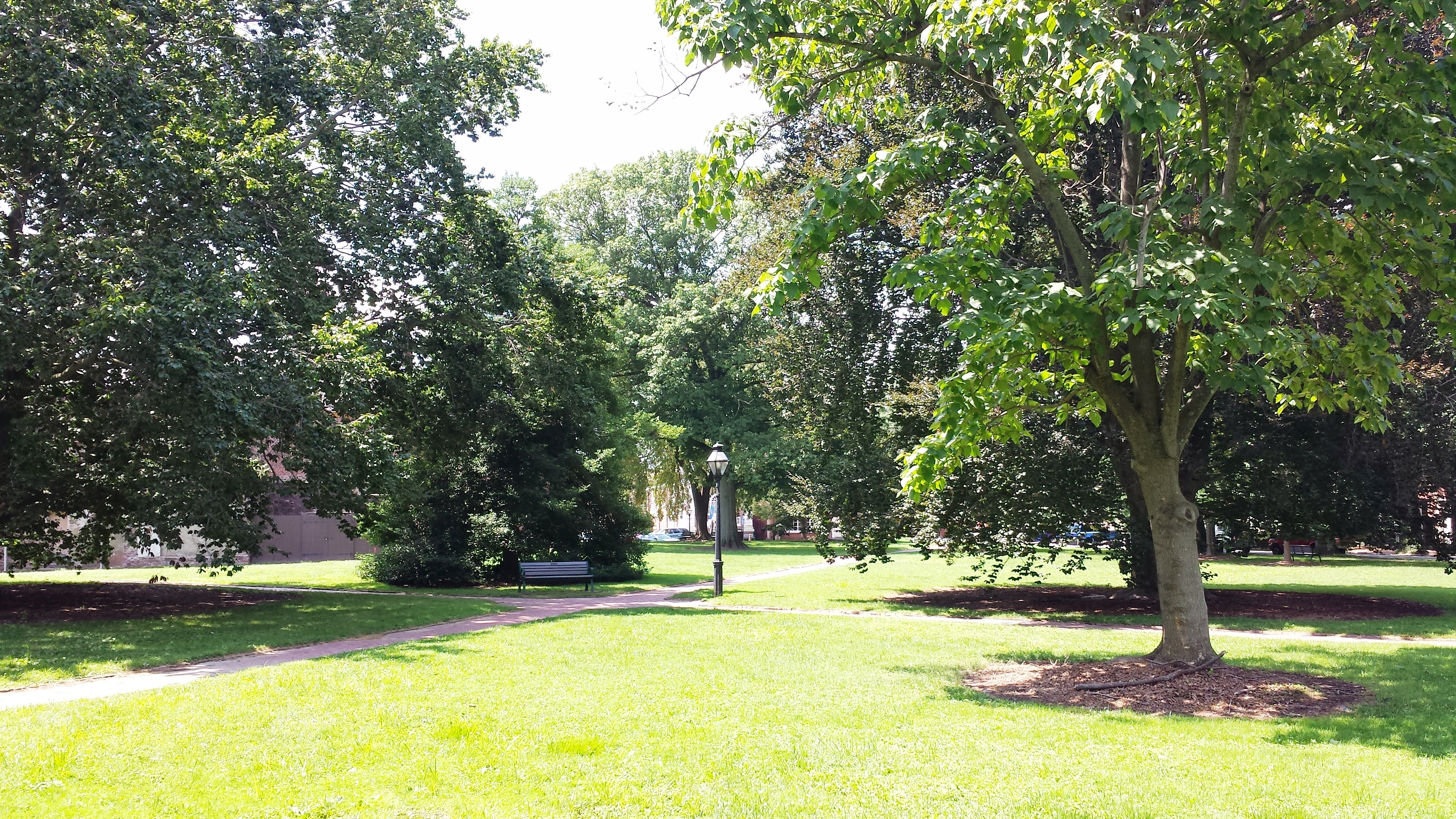
New Castle Green

== Description ==
The park covers the early colonial history of Delaware and the role Delaware played in the establishment of the nation, leading up to it being the first state to ratify the U.S. Constitution. It tells the unique story of the early settlement of the Delaware Valley by the Dutch, Swedes, Finns, and English and their relationship with Native Americans. It also seeks to preserve the cultural landscape of the Brandywine River Valley.

Russ Smith, the park's first superintendent, described its mission in part as, "I think it's... the recognition that it's not all about Jamestown and Plymouth Rock. There were 13 different traditions established in the 1600s that came together in 1776. The designation helps shine a light on that story. The way this place differs from other places is the diversity of the settlement. You had Dutch, Swedes, Finns, then the English, the Germans. The Netherlands were like the melting pot of Europe. So you had the Germans there, the French, the Belgians, and all these people were here in the Delaware Valley in the 1600s. You had that diversity and you also had a tradition of tolerance. As I tell people, while Virginia was jailing Baptists and New England was burning Quakers, there was freedom of religion on the Delaware River even before William Penn arrived. There is a common misconception that the English were the only ones who had any kind of representative government, and so that's where we got it. Well, the Netherlands were a Republic. The Swedes were not an absolute monarchy, so there was a tradition of self-determination as well."

== Sites ==
The sites contained within the park are:

=== New Castle Court House, Green, and Sheriff's House ===
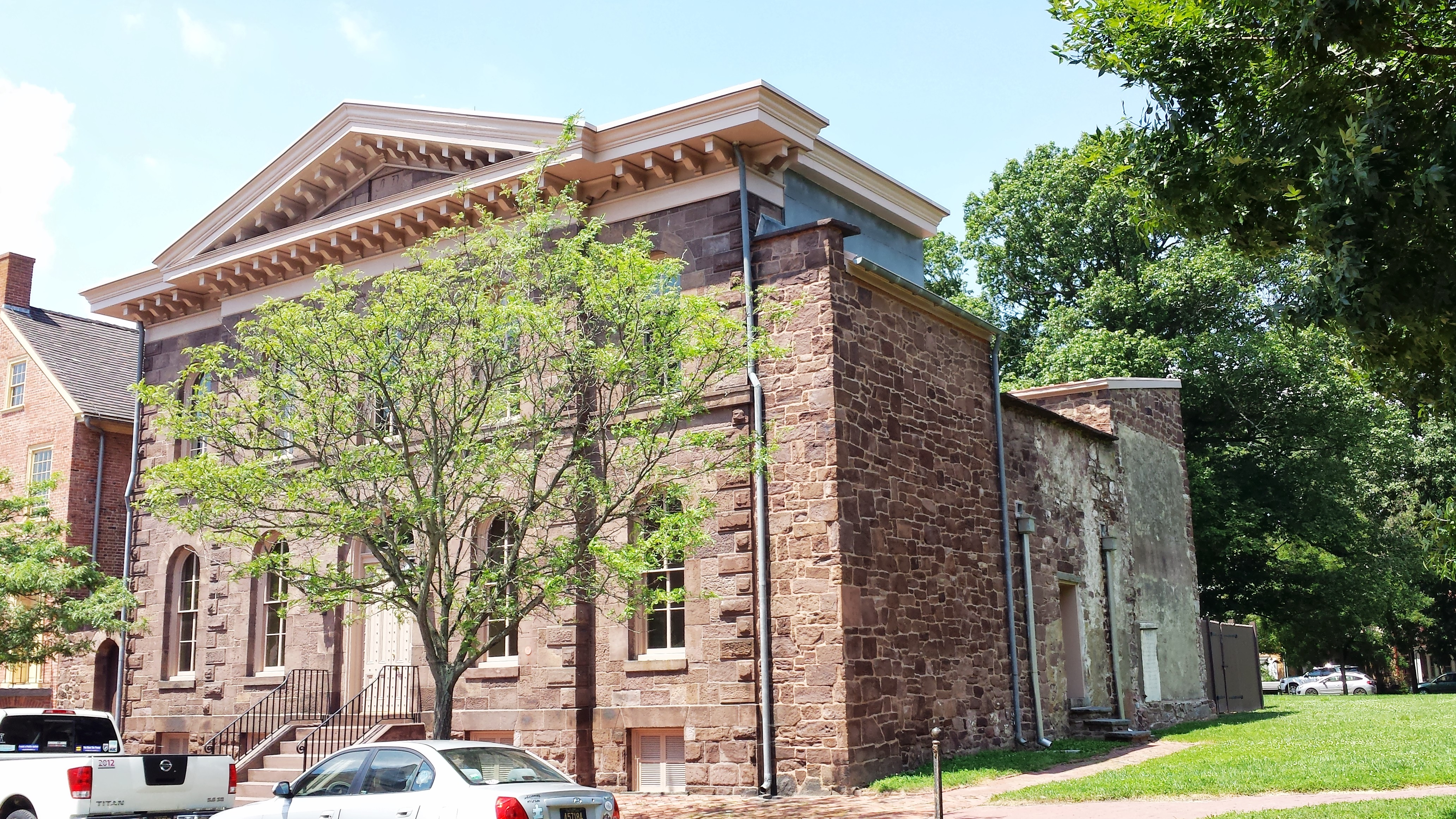
Sheriff's House

The New Castle Court House, which dates back to 1730, is one of the oldest courthouses in the country and played a role in a number of historic events that shaped the nation. The cupola of the Court House is the center of a 12 mile circle that forms the border between Delaware, Pennsylvania, and Maryland; the most famous attempt to survey these borders, incorporating the circle, was the Mason–Dixon line. The building was used as the meeting place for Delaware's colonial assembly, and was where the assembly voted in favor of independence from both Pennsylvania and England in 1776. The Declaration of Independence was read from the Court House's second floor balcony, and Delaware's first Constitution was drafted and adopted here. U.S. Supreme Court Justice Samuel Chase was impeached over his actions in the Court House during a trial in 1800. In 1848, U.S. Chief Justice Roger Taney presided over a series of trials in the Court House when prominent Quaker abolitionists and Underground Railroad conductors Thomas Garrett and John Hunn were accused of violating the Fugitive Slave Act. The Garrett trial was an inspiration to Harriet Beecher Stowe for certain scenes in Uncle Tom's Cabin.

The New Castle Green was first laid out as a town common in the 1650s by the Dutch colonists who founded New Castle. It is located a block away from the spot where William Penn first arrived in America in 1682, and is bounded by several historic structures, including the Court House, the 1809 federal Arsenal, and the 1703 Immanuel Episcopal Church on the Green where founder George Read is buried. The Sheriff's House, built in 1857, abuts the Court House and will eventually serve as First State National Historical Park's headquarters and Visitor Center.

The Court House and the Green are owned by the state of Delaware, with the National Park Service owning a conservation easement on them. The Sheriff's House is owned by the National Park Service.

=== Dover Green ===
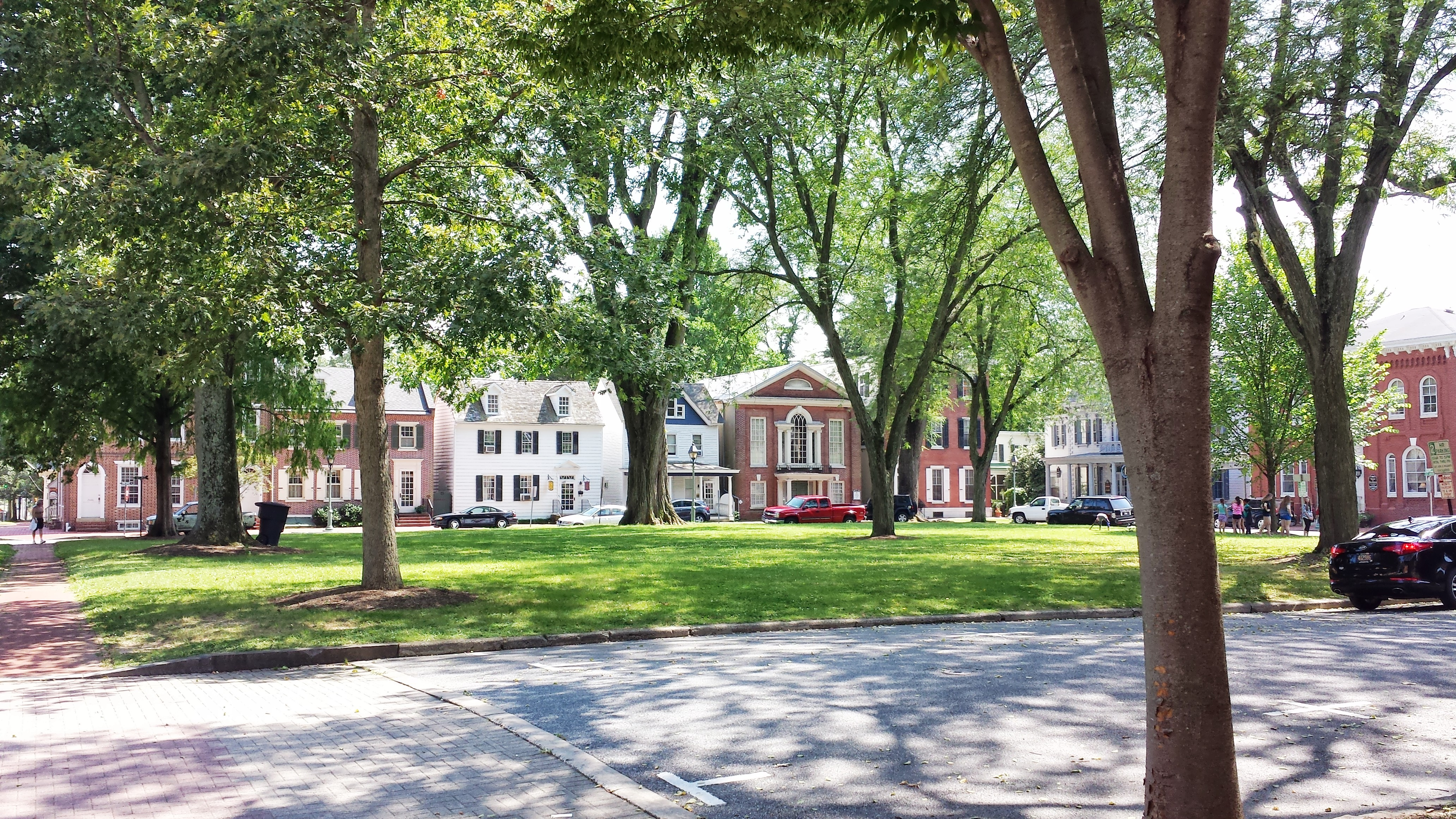
Dover Green

The Dover Green was first laid out as a public space in 1717 by William Penn's surveyors, and has been host to several historic events. The Declaration of Independence was read to the citizens of Dover from the Green in 1776, and it was the site of the mustering of a Continental Army regiment during the Revolution. When the proximity of the British navy threatened New Castle, the state changed its capital city to Dover in 1777, and a State House was built just off the Green in 1787. At a tavern which once stood on the Green, a convention ratified the Constitution on December 7, 1787, making Delaware the first state.

The Green is owned by the city of Dover, with the National Park Service owning a conservation easement. It is approximately 40 miles south of the park headquarters in New Castle.

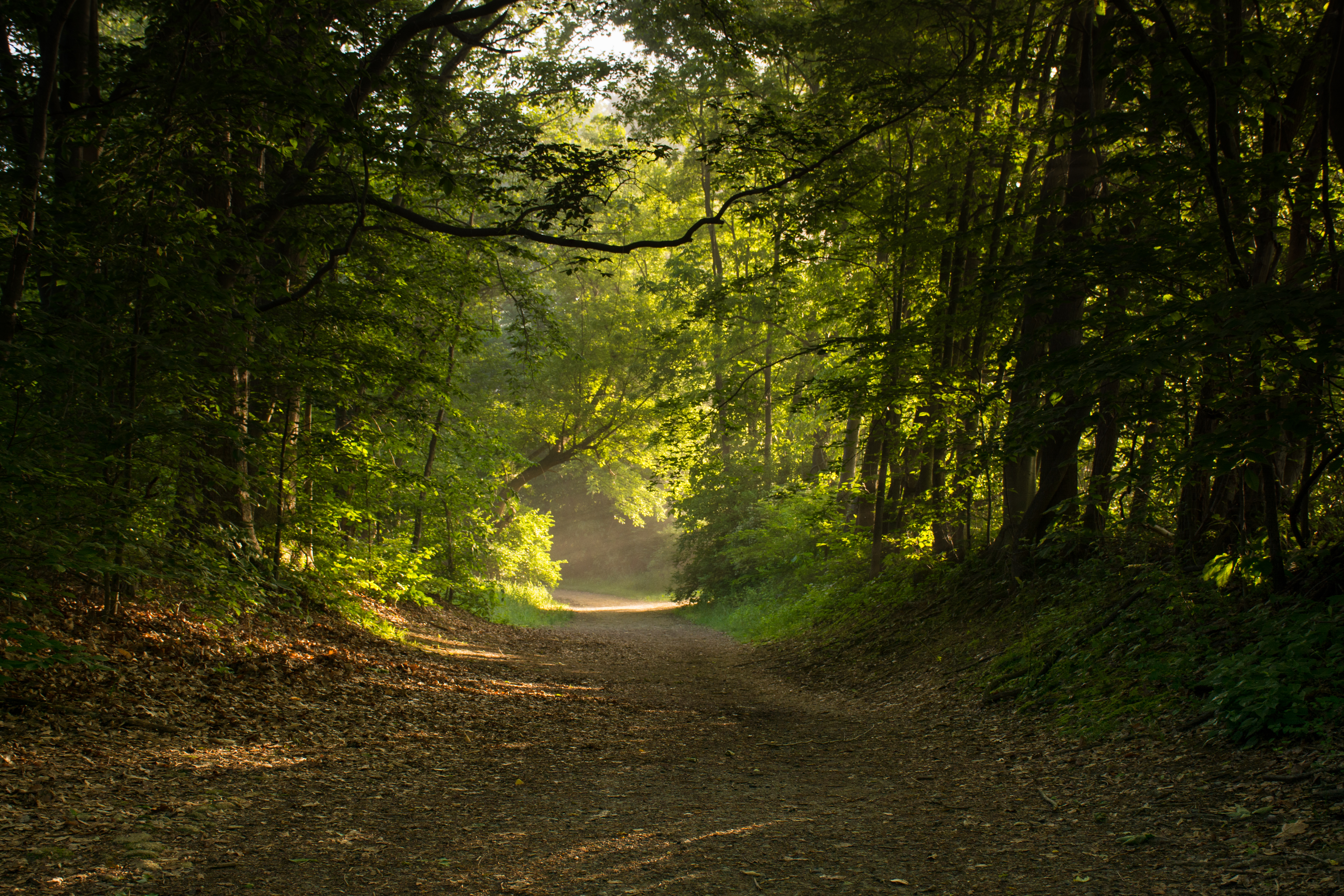
Beaver Valley

=== Brandywine Valley ===
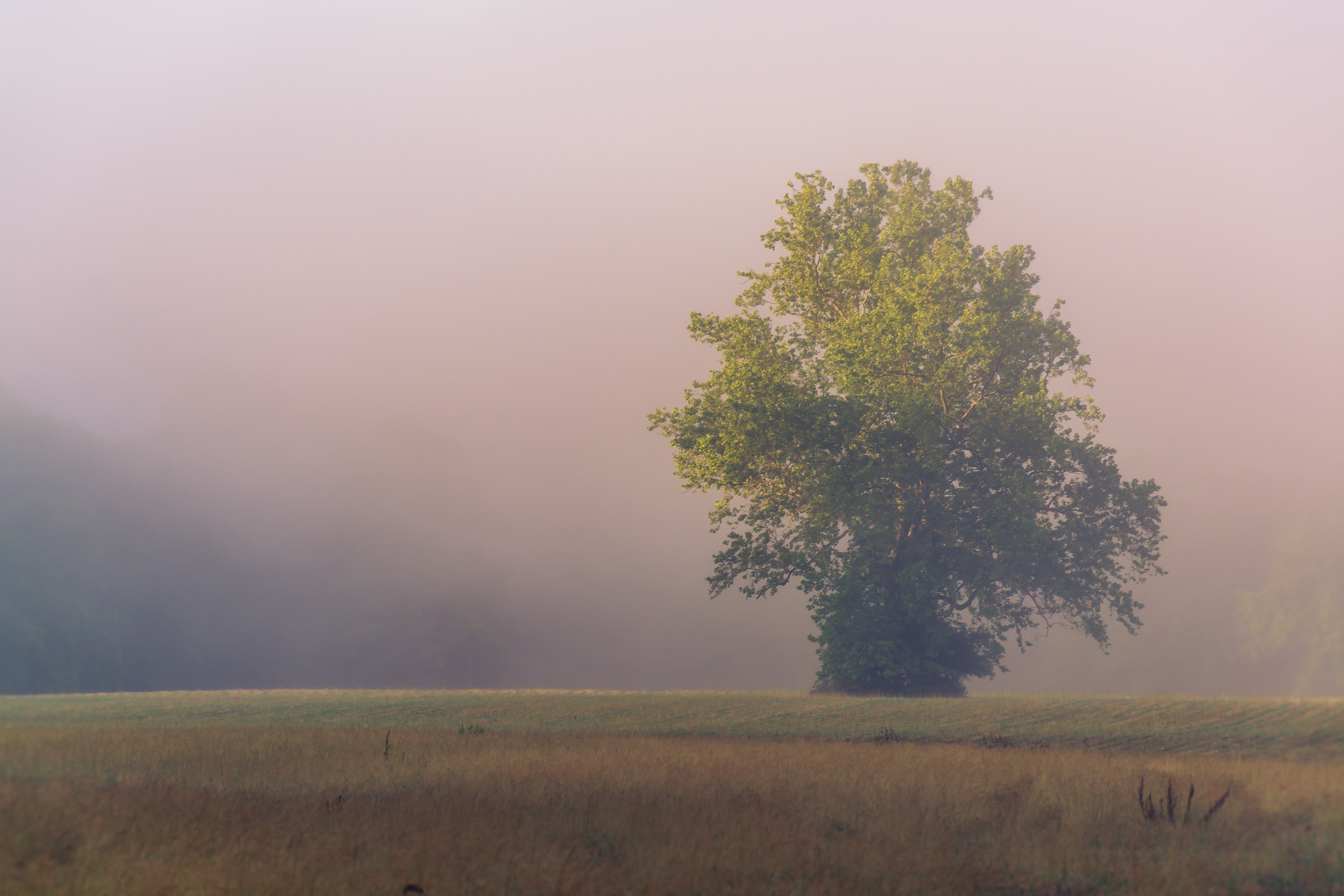
Brandywine Valley

Brandywine Valley (formerly Beaver Valley) consists of land originally purchased in the early 1900s by Quaker industrialist and conservationist William Poole Bancroft, whose goal it was to preserve as much land as possible along the Brandywine River to ensure its scenic rural beauty remained for future generations as the cities of Wilmington and Philadelphia continued to expand. Much of the land has remained unchanged since it was set aside for preservation, and it includes forests and rolling farmsteads that were once primarily settled by the Quakers who followed Penn to America. The tract is adjacent to Delaware's Brandywine Creek State Park, and the Brandywine Valley National Scenic Byway runs through it.

Brandywine Valley is owned by the National Park Service. It is approximately 12 miles north of the park headquarters in New Castle. Brandywine Valley is the largest component of First State National Historical Park, comprising 1,100 acres (220 of which extend into southeastern Pennsylvania). It is open for recreational activities such as hiking, horseback riding, biking, and kayaking.

=== Fort Christina ===
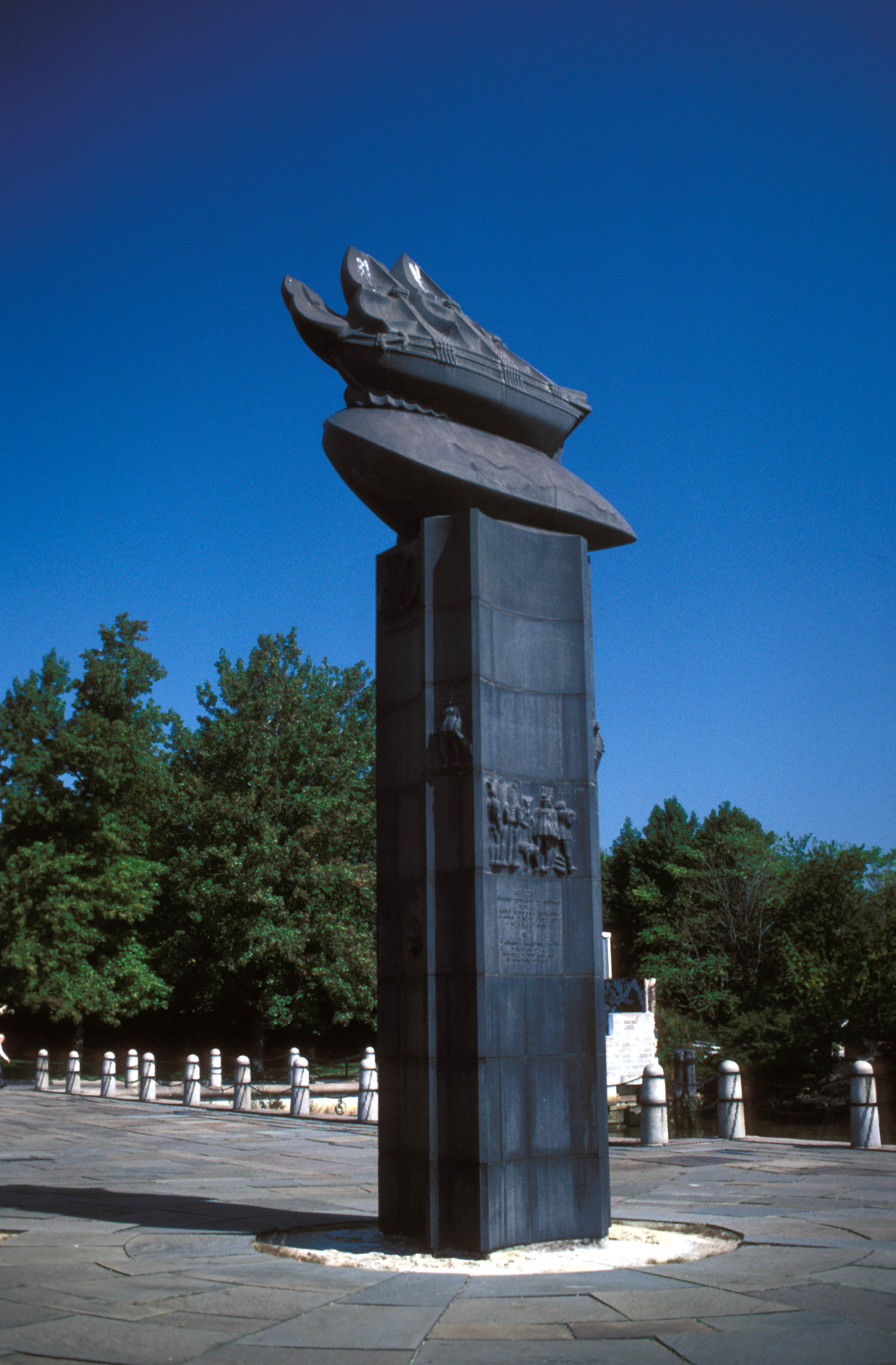
Fort Christina monument

Located in Wilmington, Fort Christina is an enclosed park that preserves the original landing site, known as "The Rocks," of the colonists who established New Sweden in 1638, the first European settlement in the Delaware Valley. After negotiating with the local Leni Lenape to purchase the land, the settlers disembarked from their ships, the Fogel Grip and Kalmar Nyckel, and built a fort and town at this site. As the colony grew, more settlers arrived and spread out, establishing outposts in New Jersey, outside present-day Philadelphia, and along the Brandywine River.

The park is a National Historic Landmark and includes a monument by Swedish sculptor Carl Milles that was donated by Sweden for the colony's tricentennial anniversary.

=== Old Swedes' Church ===
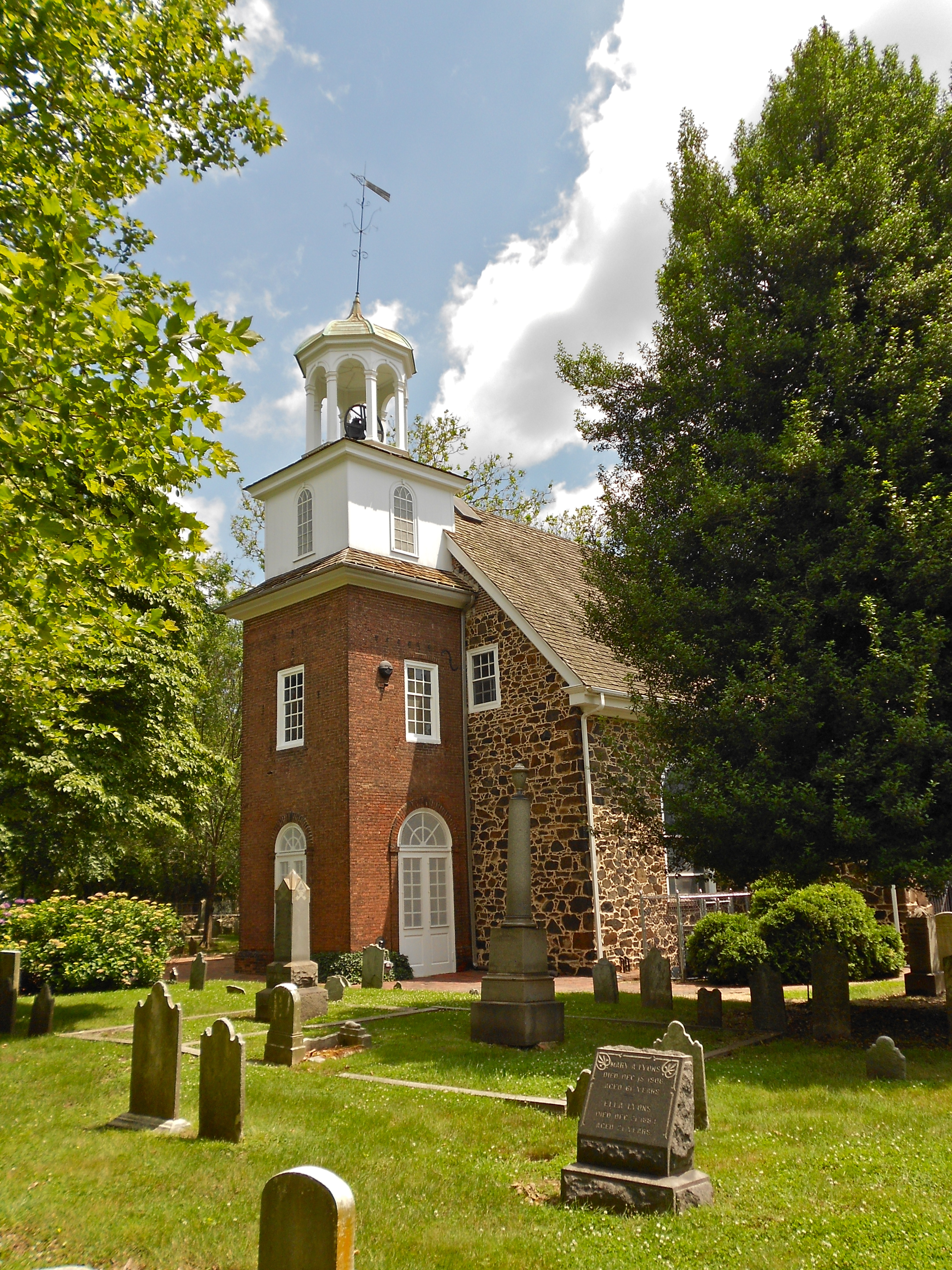
Old Swedes' Church

Old Swedes' Church is located in Wilmington about a block from Fort Christina, where the New Sweden colony was first established. Built in 1698, it is one of the oldest churches in the United States. It was built on the original burial site for Fort Christina and so its cemetery contains graves dating back to the 1630s. The pulpit was carved in 1698 and is believed to be the oldest in the United States by the NPS. The church itself is built from Swedish bricks that had originally been used as ballast by the ships which brought the colonists to America.

The churchyard includes the Hendrickson House, a Swedish home dating back to 1690 and believed to be one of the oldest Swedish homes remaining in existence in the country. The house serves as a museum dedicated to interpreting early Swedish colonial life.

Old Swedes' Church is a National Historic Landmark, and is not to be confused with another church known as Old Swedes', located in Philadelphia.

=== John Dickinson Plantation ===
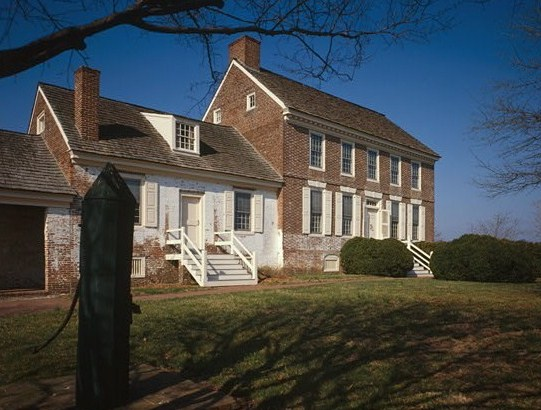
John Dickinson House

This plantation house, built in 1740 outside of Dover, was the boyhood home and country estate of John Dickinson, known as "the Penman of the Revolution" and considered one of the foremost founding fathers of the country. His Letters from a Farmer in Pennsylvania and "The Liberty Song" (which included the first use of the phrase "united we stand, divided we fall"), were early articulations of the rights of the British citizens in America. As a delegate to the Continental Congress, Dickinson authored the Olive Branch Petition and the Declaration of the Causes and Necessity of Taking Up Arms. Later he was also the primary author of the Articles of Confederation, and was one of the drafters of the U.S. Constitution.

The plantation is a National Historic Landmark.

== Park history ==
Prior to the creation of the First State National Monument, Delaware did not have a unit of the National Park System within its borders, a fact which was troubling to U.S. Senator Tom Carper. Beginning in 2002, Carper began holding hearings around the state and soliciting suggestions from residents for sites that would be worthy of inclusion in a new National Park unit. These efforts culminated in 2006, when Congress directed the National Park Service to conduct a special resource study of historic and scenic sites in Delaware's coastal areas. After concluding its study in 2009, the National Park Service recommended the creation of a National Historical Park including the New Castle Court House Museum, the Dover Green, Fort Christina, Old Swedes' Church, the John Dickinson Plantation, Stonum (home of founder George Read), Lombardy Hall (home of founder Gunning Bedford Jr.) and the Ryve's Holt House. Following the conclusion of the study, Carper and other members of Delaware's congressional delegation proposed the First State National Historical Park Act of 2011, which included the aforementioned sites but did not include the Woodlawn tract at Beaver Valley which was eventually included in the National Monument.

The act garnered high-profile support from former Delaware resident Ken Burns, who had recently earned critical acclaim for his documentary The National Parks: America's Best Idea. Burns stated, "We have been able to, as an expansive country, drink in our entire history, good and bad, and embrace it all. We Americans are bound together not only in geography but in time by these places. It is so, so important that this state, where it all began, has sites that reflect our extraordinarily old, among the oldest, histories of settlement on this continent and that we unite with all the other states in celebrating that." Despite this, while the bill was approved by the Senate Energy and Natural Resources Committee, it failed to pass in the full Senate and was not approved in the House committee.

The Mt. Cuba Center donated over $20 million to The Conservation Fund enabling it to purchase the Woodlawn Tract in Beaver Valley with the intention of including it in a future park once the land became available for donation at the end of 2012. In February 2013, the First State National Historical Park Act was proposed again in the new Congress. The revised legislation included the Woodlawn property but dropped Stonum and Lombardy Hall. The bill was approved in Senate committee on March 14, 2013, but the Conservation Fund could not continue to hold onto the Woodlawn property, increasing the urgency. This led to the presidential proclamation on March 25 creating the National Monument. The Conservation Fund donated the 1,100 acres of Woodlawn land to the National Park Service, becoming the Brandywine Valley unit.

Language redesignating the First State National Monument as the First State National Historical Park was included in the National Defense Authorization Act for 2015. The bill also added the Dickinson Plantation, Fort Christina, and Old Swedes' Church to the park. The NDAA was approved by Congress and signed into law by President Obama.
