= Lombardy Hall =

Historic house in Fairfax, Delaware, USA

- U.S. National Register of Historic Places
- U.S. National Historic Landmark
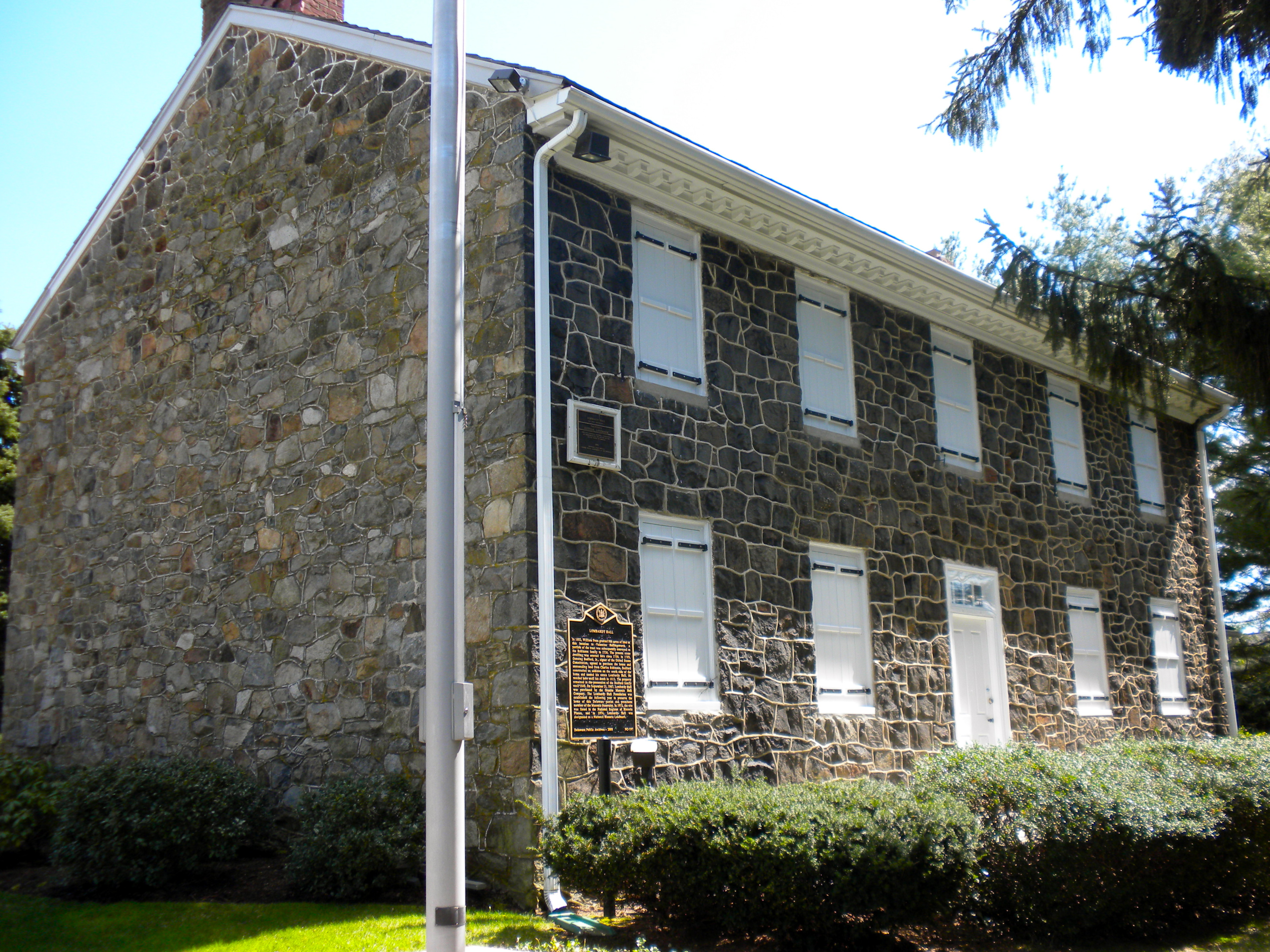
- Location: 1611 Concord Pike, Fairfax, Delaware
- Coordinates: 39°46′53″N 75°32′43″W
- Area: 1.5 acres (0.61 ha)
- Built: 1750
- Architectural style: Georgian
- NRHP reference No.: 72000292

Significant dates
- Added to NRHP: December 05, 1972
- Designated NHL: December 2, 1974

Lombardy Hall is a historic house at 1611 Concord Pike in Fairfax, New Castle County, Delaware, United States. Probably built about 1750, this stone house is notable as the home of U.S. Founding Father Gunning Bedford Jr. (1747-1812), a delegate to the Constitutional Convention and a signer of the U. S. Constitution. It was declared a National Historic Landmark in 1974.

== Description and history ==
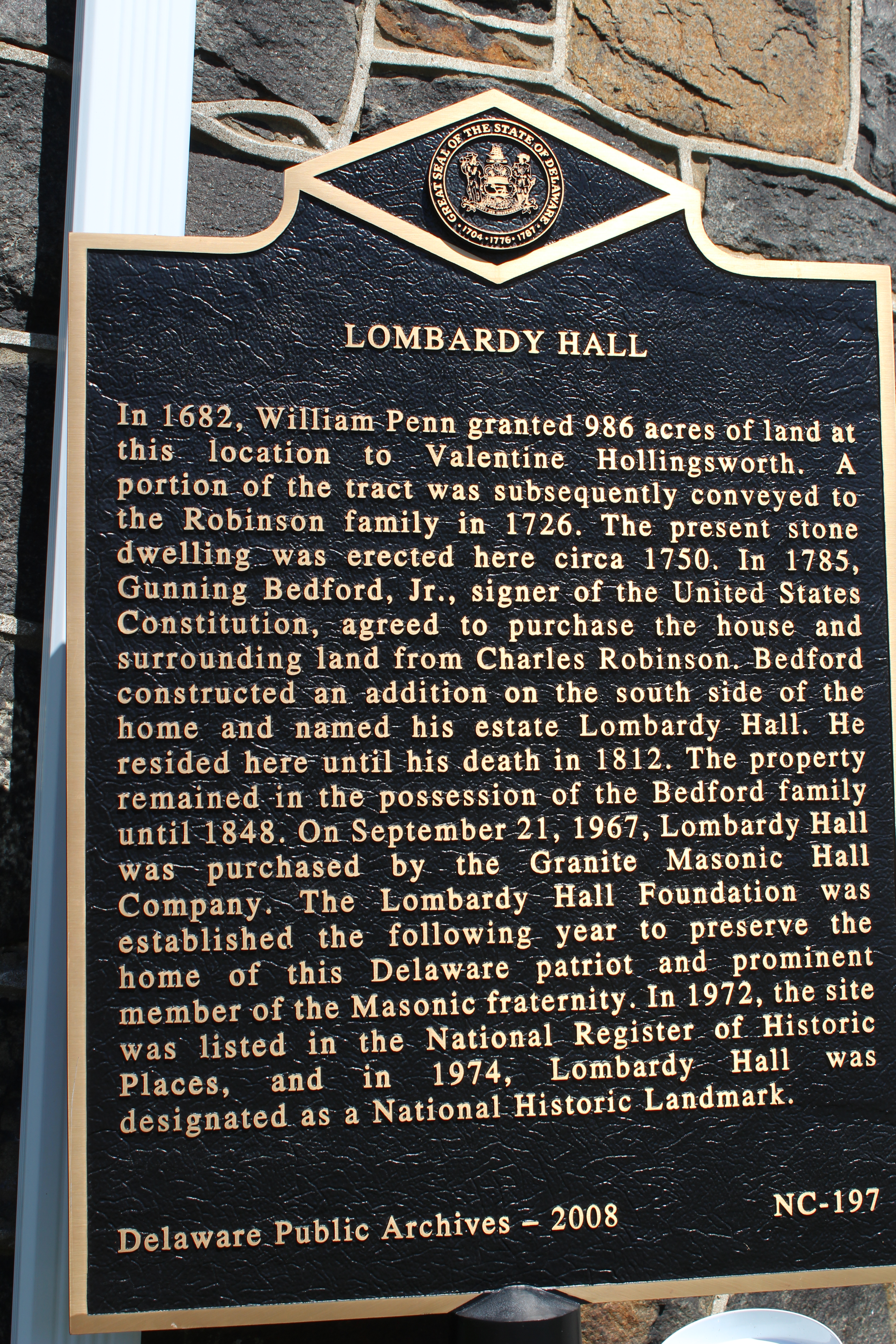
Plaque at Lombardy Hall

Lombardy Hall is located in Brandywine Hundred north of Wilmington, Delaware, on the east side of Concord Pike (United States Route 202, north of its junction with Foulk Road (Delaware Route 261). It is a 2 1/2-story stone structure, with a slate side gable roof and brick chimneys. The main facade is five bays wide, with a center entrance topped by a four-light transom window. Interior features include original wooden paneling, cornice moulding, staircases, and trim. The main ballroom has a particularly fine Federal style fireplace mantel.

This property, once much larger, was purchased in 1785 by Gunning Bedford Jr. At the time, it had a three-bay stone house, which Bedford had enlarged to its present five-bay size by the addition of the ballroom wing. Bedford was one of Delaware's delegates to the Philadelphia Convention, whose principal outcome was the United States Constitution. At the convention, Bedford gave a particularly impassioned speech arguing for better representation in the government of small states, contributing to the eventual adoption of the per-state equal representation in the United States Senate. Bedford later served as a federal judge, and divided his residency between this house and a townhouse in Wilmington.

Since 1968, the house has been owned by a local Masonic lodge, which in the late 20th century oversaw its restoration. Bedford was the first Grand Master of the Delaware Masons.

== See also ==
- List of the oldest buildings in Delaware
- List of National Historic Landmarks in Delaware
- National Register of Historic Places listings in northern New Castle County, Delaware
