= Hendrickson House =

Building in Delaware, United States

Coordinates: 39.7385°N 75.5414°W

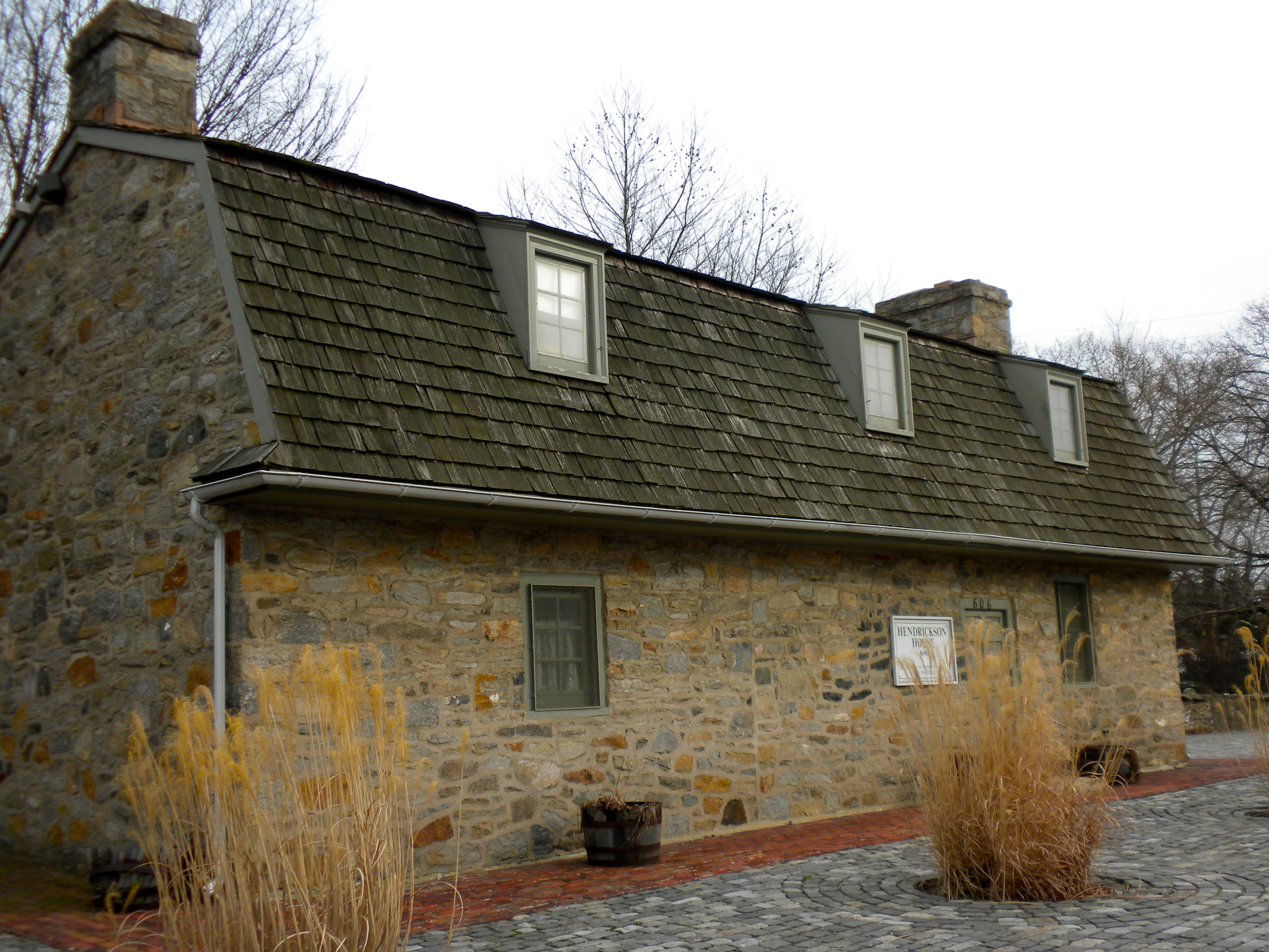
Hendrickson House

Hendrickson House is one of the oldest houses in the U.S. state of Delaware and one of the oldest surviving Swedish-American homes in the United States.

The house was originally built in the early 18th century in Chester, Pennsylvania as the home of Swedish farmer Andrew Hendrickson and his wife, Brigitta Morton, who were both born in the New Sweden colony. In 1958 the house was moved to Wilmington, Delaware. The Hendrickson House is part of Old Swedes Historic Site, which includes Holy Trinity Church (Old Swedes) (1698–99) and burial ground (1638), a National Historic Landmark.

== See also ==
- List of the oldest buildings in Delaware
- List of the oldest buildings in Pennsylvania
