= List of the oldest buildings in Delaware =

This article attempts to list the oldest extant buildings surviving in the state of Delaware in the United States of America, including the oldest houses in Delaware and any other surviving structures. Some dates are approximate and based upon dendrochronology, architectural studies, and historical records. Sites on the list are generally from the First Period of American architecture or earlier. To be listed here a site must:

- date from prior to 1776; or
- be the oldest building in a county, large city, or oldest of its type (church, government building, etc.),

Building	Image	Location	First Built	Use	Notes
Block House		Claymont, Delaware	1654	Defense	Possibly the oldest building in Delaware, however, some date the building to ca. 1723
Ryves Holt House		Lewes, Delaware	1665	Residence	Likely the oldest house in Delaware
Town Point		Dover, Delaware	1677	Residence	
Lombardy Hall		Wilmington, Delaware	1683 (earliest part)	Residence	National Historic Landmark (NHL), home to Gunning Bedford Jr., a delegate to the Constitutional Convention and a signer of the U.S. Constitution.
Belmont Hall		Smyrna, Delaware	1685 (earliest part)	Residence	large Georgian addition built about 1753 by Thomas Collins, who would become the sixth governor of Delaware.
Hendrickson House		Wilmington, Delaware from Chester, Pennsylvania	1690	Residence	Moved from Chester, PA to Wilmington, DE in 1958
Holy Trinity Church (Old Swedes)		Wilmington, Delaware	1698	Religious	Oldest Swedish Church in the United States
Brecknock		Camden, Delaware	ca. 1700	Residence	
Dutch House		Newcastle, Delaware	1701	Residence	Built either in the mid 1690s or 1701. Historic home and museum
Maston House		Seaford, Delaware	1703	Residence	
Woodstock (Wilmington, Delaware)		Wilmington, Delaware	1727	Residence	
New Castle County Court House		New Castle, Delaware	1732	Government	One of the oldest continuously used courthouses in America
Prince George's Chapel		Dagsboro, Delaware	1755	Religious	Episcopal chapel of ease
Barratt's Chapel		Frederica, Delaware	1780	Religious	Oldest Methodist church building in the U.S.
Pratt House		Milford, Delaware	1785	Residential	Former home of the influential Pratt family.

== See also ==
- List of the oldest buildings in the United States
- National Register of Historic Places listings in Delaware
