= Kristine Church, Falun =

Coordinates: 60.6078°N 15.6311°E

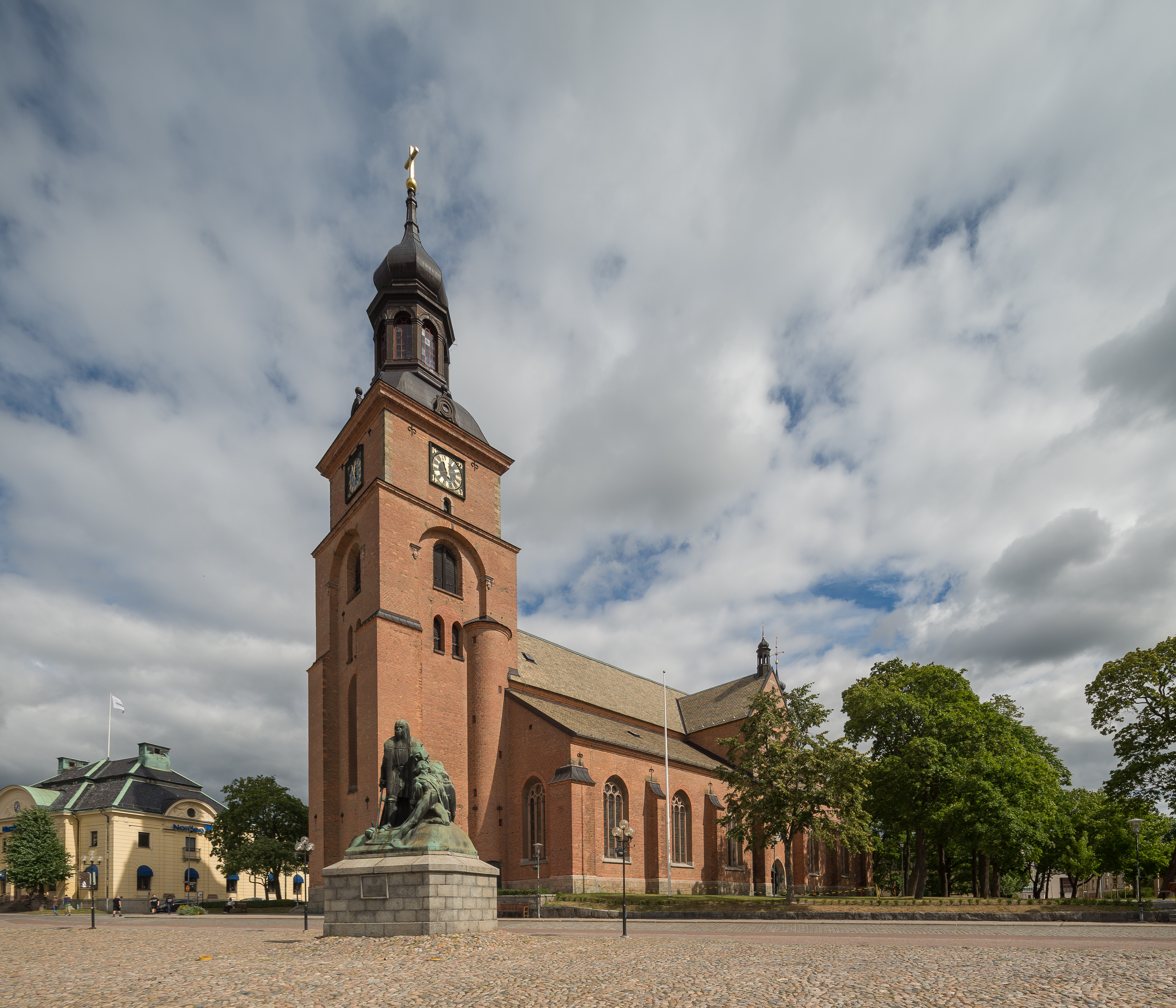
Kristine Church, Falun

Kristine Church is the parish church of Falu Kristine in the Diocese of Västerås of the Church of Sweden in Falun.

== Construction ==
Construction of the Kristine Church started in 1642 and it was ready for use in 1655 under the name of The New Church of Falun. One of the instigators of building the church, County Governor Johan Berndes, had chosen the name Kristine Church as an hommage to Queen Christina in 1651 but the name had to be altered after the queen abdicated and converted to Catholicism in 1654. The name Kristine Church was reintroduced during the late 1700s. The tower was built during the years 1658 - 1660. The bricks of which the church was built were handmade in Rankhyttan, 25 kilometers from Falun. Limestone for the pillars of the church was taken from Rättvik.

== Interior ==
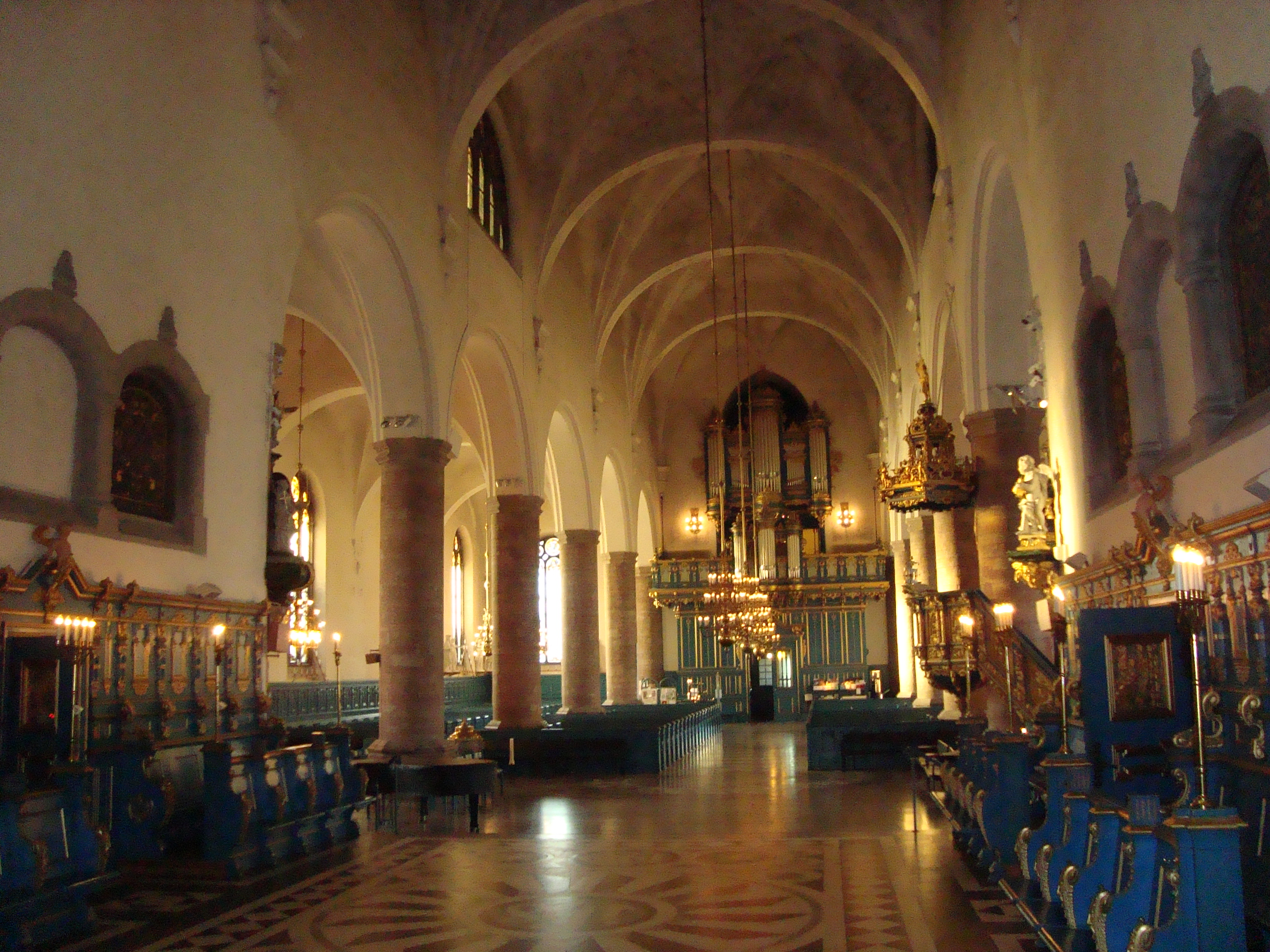
Kristine Church interior

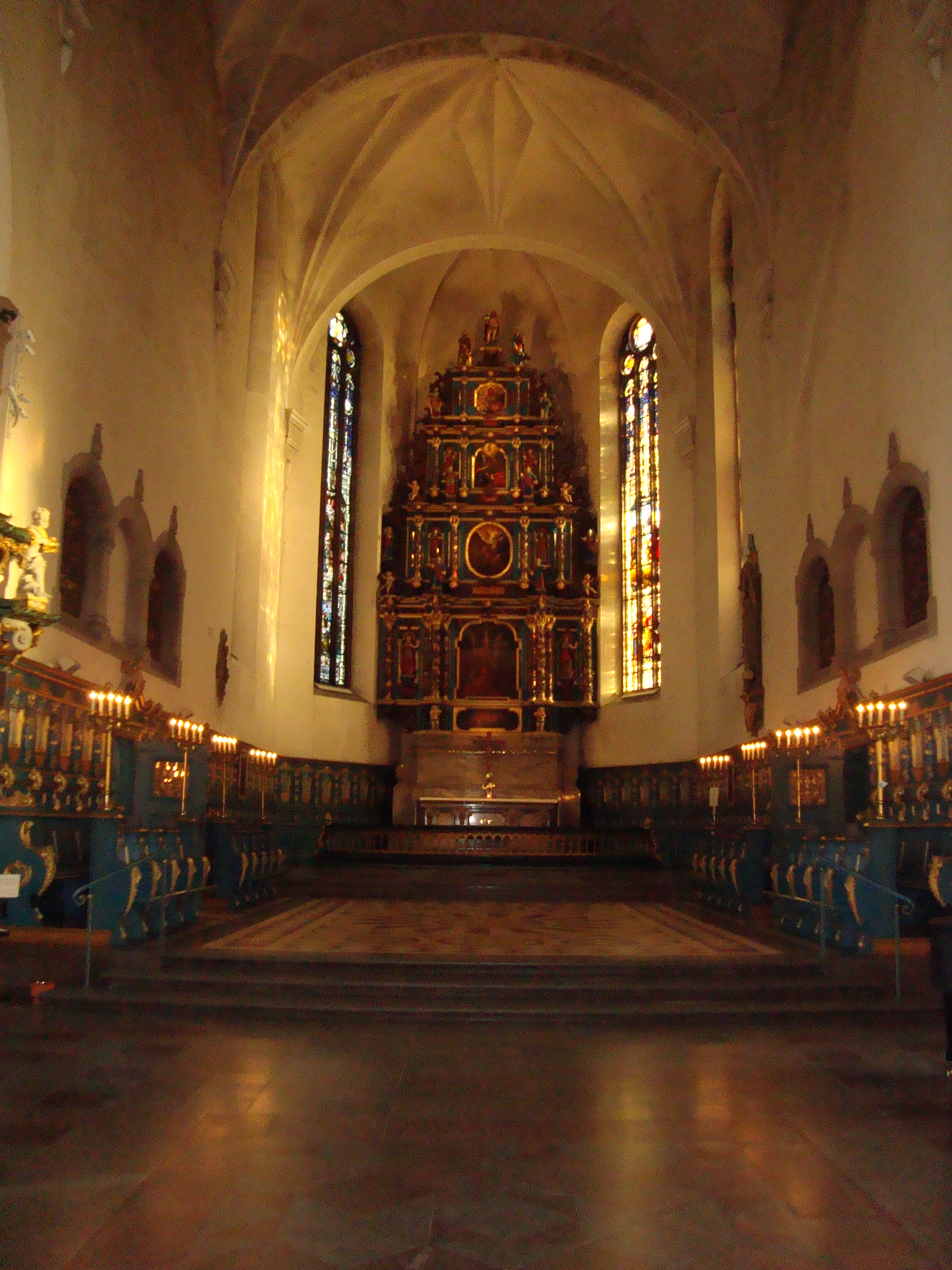
Kristine Church interior

The interior was considerably altered by the restoration in 1905: A new organ and organ balcony were built. The enclosed pews were exchanged for open ones. The doors of the old pews as well as the endpieces were used as panelling around the walls. The interior woodwork, which to begin with was unpainted and then later was painted white, received at this time its blue and gold colours. The old copper portals were exchanged for new ones. The latest restoration took place in 1965.

The Kristine Church is an expression of the City of Falun's esteem and importance during the 1600 and is also an eminent representative of the later part of The Younger Wasa Period.

The altarpiece and the pulpit were made in 1669 by the German sculptor Ewerdt Friis.

The two chandeliers toward the front of the nave were donated to the church in 1844 and the one in the rear was purchased by the parish in 1950.

The wooden sculptures in the southwest corner were originally part of the old organ balcony and were made in 1687.

The sepulchral tablets are from the latter part of the 1600 and the 1700. The windows in the sanctuary were made in Munich in 1905.

== Textiles ==
Prominent among the church's textiles are a chasuble and a cope, both from 1666.

== Church silver ==
Outstanding among the church's silver pieces are a chalice with paten from around 1550, a wine decanter made around 1600 and a christening bowl from 1659.

== Christening font ==
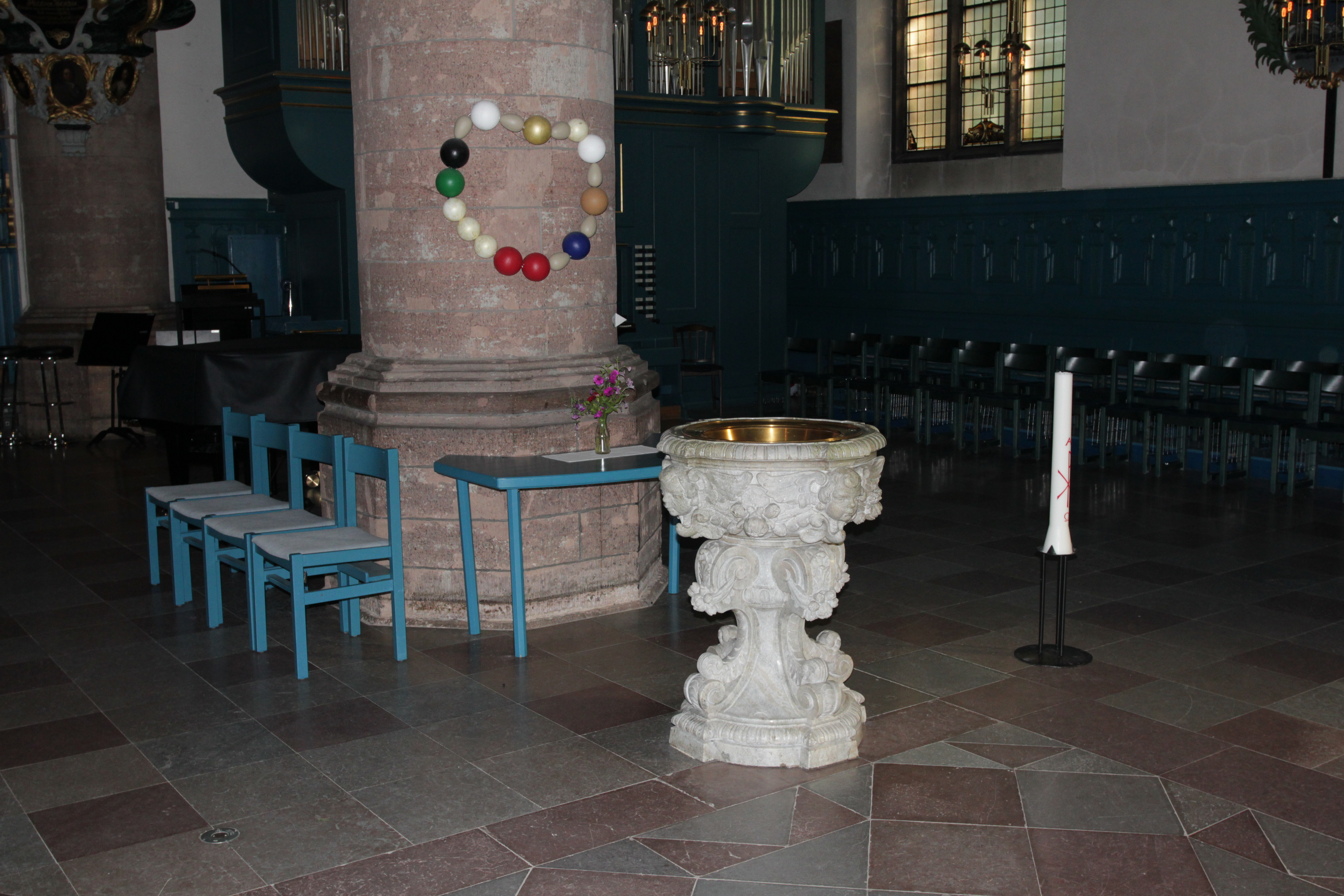
Christening font

The christening font is made of Swedish marble in 1906.

== Bells ==
There are three church bells, originally cast in 1658, but all of them have since been recast.

== Organs ==
The balcony organ was built 1905 - 1906 by E A Setterquist and son, Örebro. It was restored 1979 - 80 by A Magnusson's organ works in Mölndal and is entire in its original form. The organ in the lower sanctuary was built by Magnusson's organ works and was inaugurated in 1982. In tone and outer design it is built similar to a baroque organ and thus harmonizes with the rest of the church. The nearest prototype is the organ built by the famous Johan Niclas Cahman in the Kristine Church 1724. Out of the new organ's 1.905 pipes almost 300 come from the organ from 1724.
