= Town Point (Dover, Delaware) =

Historic house in Delaware, United States

- U.S. National Register of Historic Places
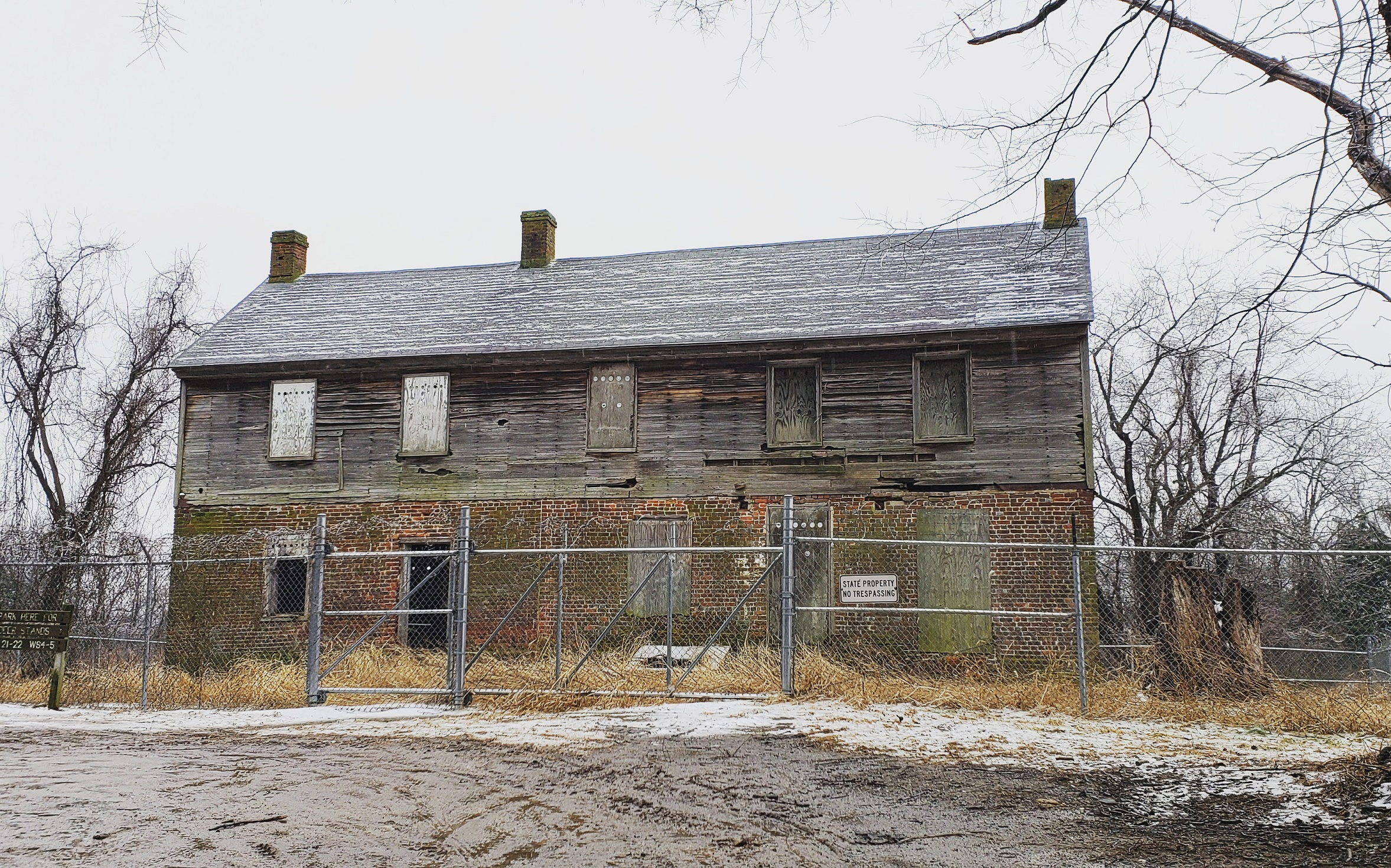

- Location within Delaware Location within the United States
- Location: Kitts Hummock Rd., Dover, Delaware
- Coordinates: 39°4′53″N 75°25′44″W
- Area: 1 acre (0.40 ha)
- Built: c. 1677
- NRHP reference No.: 72000280
- Added to NRHP: December 5, 1972

Town Point, also known as Kingston-upon-Hull and Logan's Lane, is a historic home located at Dover, Kent County, Delaware. It is one of the oldest buildings in Delaware. It was built in three sections, with the earliest dated to about 1677. The oldest section is a brick, three bay structure consisting of two rooms and a center hall. A one-story, brick kitchen wing was added to the original section at an early date. A five-bay frame second story was added early in the 19th century.

It was added to the National Register of Historic Places in 1972. It currently sits in a state of disrepair.

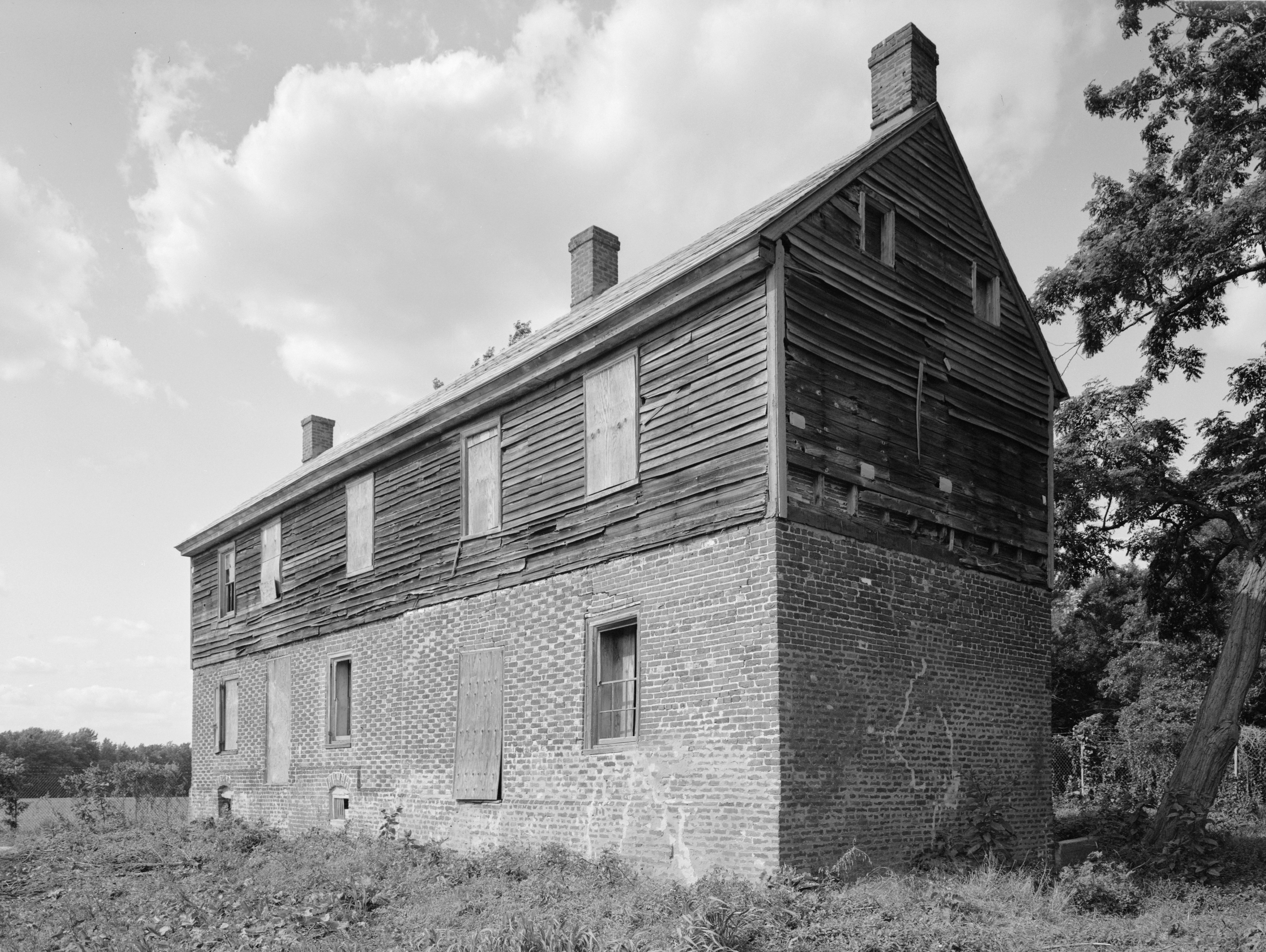
Town Point, HABS Photo, July 1982

== See also ==
- List of the oldest buildings in Delaware
