= William Carlisle =

William Carlisle may refer to:

- Bill Carlisle (1908–2003), American country music singer, songwriter, comedian and guitarist popular in the late 1940s and 1950s
- William L. Carlisle (1890–1964), one of the last train robbers in America
