= Secretary of State of Delaware =

U.S. state government position

- Incumbent; Charuni Patibanda-Sanchez since January 28, 2025
- Department of State
- Type: Secretary of State
- Formation: 1778
- First holder: James Booth Sr.
- Succession: Second

The secretary of state of Delaware is the head of the Department of State of the U.S. state of Delaware. The department is in charge of a wide variety of public and governmental services, and is divided into the following divisions:

- Delaware Division of Libraries
- Delaware Division of the Arts
- Delaware Public Archives
- Delaware State Banking Commissioner
- Conference Centers(Buena Vista/Belmont Hall)
- Division of Corporations(handles business records, including lien statements under the Uniform Commercial Code)
- Government Information Center
- Delaware Heritage Commission
- Historical & Cultural Affairs
- Human Relations
- Merit Employee Relations Board
- Notaries Public
- Delaware Board of Pardons
- Professional Regulation
- Delaware Public Advocate
- Public Employment Relations Board
- Delaware Public Integrity Commission
- Delaware Public Service Commission
- Delaware Commission of Veterans Affairs
- Delaware Veterans Home
- Delaware Commission for Women

Some of the most important responsibilities of the secretary of state involve registry of businesses and corporations, monitoring banks, and other commercial activities. However, unlike many other U.S. secretaries of state, the Delaware secretary of state is not in charge of administering elections in Delaware. The Delaware Department of Elections is a separate agency from the Department of State.

== Secretaries of state (years served in office) ==
- James Booth Sr. (1778–1799)
- Abraham Ridgely (1799–1802)
- William B. Shields (1802)
- John Fisher (1802–1805, 1811–1812)
- William Hazzard (1805)
- Peter Robinson (1805–1808, 1814–1817, 1822–1823)
- William Warner (1808)
- Thomas Clayton (1808–1810)
- John Barratt (1810–1811)
- Willard Hall (1812–1814, 1821–1822)
- Henry M. Ridgely (1817–1821, 1824–1826)
- Henry H. Wells (1823–1824)
- John M. Clayton (1826–1828)
- Samuel Maxwell Harrington (1828–1830)
- Caleb S. Layton (1830–1833, 1836)
- James Rogers (1833–1835)
- William Hemphill Jones (1835–1836)
- John Brinkloe (1836)
- Robert Frame (1836–1837)
- Charles Marim (1837–1841)
- John W. Houston (1841–1845)
- John Wales (1845–1846)
- George P. Fisher (1846–1847)
- Daniel Moore Bates(1847–1851)
- Alfred P. Robinson (1851–1855)
- James R. Lofland (1855–1859)
- Edward Ridgely (1859–1863)
- Nathaniel B. Smithers (1863, 1895)
- Samuel M. Harrington Jr. (1863–1865)
- Custis W. Wright (1865–1871)
- John H. Paynter (1871–1875)
- Ignatius Cooper Grubb (1875–1879)
- James L. Wolcott (1879–1883)
- William R. Causey (1883–1887)
- John P. Saulsbury (1887–1889)
- John F. Saulsbury (1889–1891)
- David T. Marvel (1891–1893)
- John D. Hawkins (1893–1895)
- J. Harvey Whiteman (1895–1897)
- William H. Boyce (1897)
- James H. Hughes (1897–1901)
- Caleb R. Layton (1901–1905)
- Joseph L. Cahall (1905–1909)
- Daniel O. Hastings (1909)
- William T. Smithers (1909–1911)
- Charles S. Richards (1911–1913)
- Thomas W. Miller (1913–1915)
- George H. Hall ((1915–1917)
- Everett C. Johnson (1917–1921)
- Alden R. Benson (1921–1925)
- William G. Taylor (1925)
- Fannie Herrington (1925–1926)
- Sylvester D. Townsend Jr. (1926–1927)
- Charles H. Grantland (1927–1934)
- Walter Dent Smith ((1934–1937)
- Charles L. Terry Jr. (1937–1938)
- Josiah Marvel Jr.(1938–1941)
- Earle D. Willey (1941–1942)
- William J. Storey (1942–1949)
- Harris B. McDowell Jr. (1949–1953)
- John N. McDowell (1953–1958)
- George J. Schultz (1958–1961)
- Elisha C. Dukes (1961–1969)
- Eugene Bunting (1969–1971)
- Walton H. Simpson (1971–1973)
- Robert H. Reed (1973–1977)
- Glenn C. Kenton (1977–1985)
- Michael E. Harkins (1985–1991)
- Michael Ratchford (1992)
- William T. Quillen (1993–1994)
- Edward J. Freel (1994–2001)
- Harriet Smith Windsor (2001–2009)
- Jeffrey W. Bullock (2009–2025)
- Charuni Patibanda-Sanchez (2025–present)

== See also ==
- List of company registers
