= Charuni Patibanda-Sanchez =

American lawyer and politician

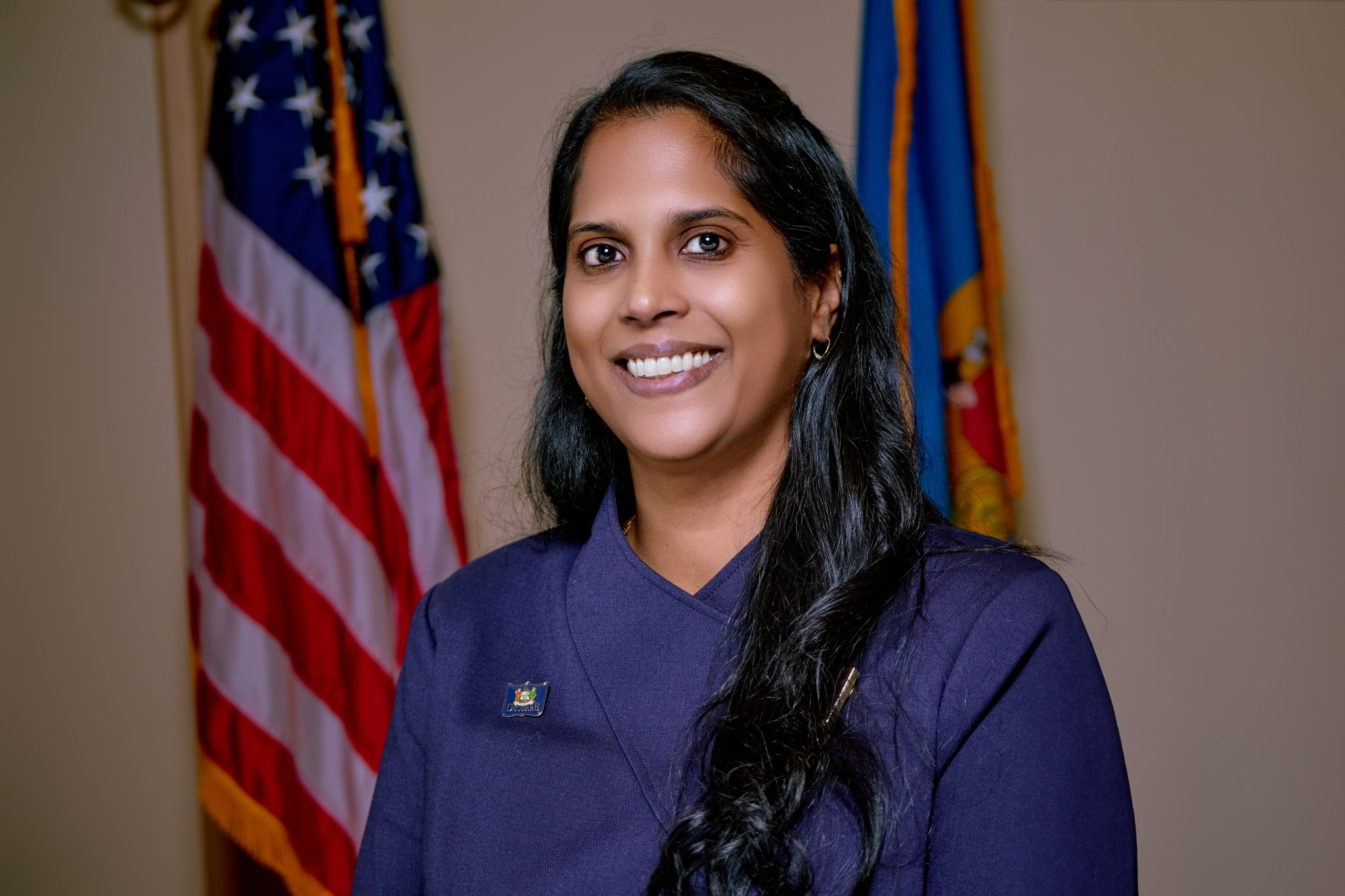
- Official Portrait, 2025

81st Secretary of State of Delaware
- Incumbent
- Assumed office January 28, 2025
- Governor: Matt Meyer
- Preceded by: Jeffrey W. Bullock

Personal details
- Born: New Castle County, Delaware, U.S.
- Political party: Democratic
- Spouse: Marcos Sanchez
- Education: University of Southern California (BA, MA); Emory University (JD)

Charuni Patibanda-Sanchez is an American lawyer and politician from the state of Delaware. Patibanda-Sanchez, a Democrat, is the Secretary of State of Delaware, an appointment she has held since January 28, 2025.

== Early life and career ==
Patibanda-Sanchez was born and raised in New Castle County, Delaware. She earned bachelor's and master's degrees in Economics from the University of Southern California and subsequently earned a juris doctor degree in 2011 from Emory University.

Following her graduation from law school in 2011, Patibanda-Sanchez began her public service career as a judiciary fellow with Senator Chris Coons.

During the period between her graduation from law school and her return to Delaware in 2021, Patibanda-Sanchez served as an associate attorney for law firms Sheppard Mullin and Glaser Weil, both in Los Angeles, where she practiced in land use, regulatory matters, and government contracts. During her residence in Los Angeles, Patibanda-Sanchez co-founded The McOsker Group, a government affairs and lobby consulting firm, where she served as the company's President.

On February 2, 2021, Matt Meyer, then New Castle County Executive, appointed Patibanda-Sanchez to the position of New Castle County Economic Development Director. In June 2023, Matt Meyer appointed Patibanda-Sanchez to the position of General Manager of the New Castle County Department of Land Use, a position that she would hold until her appointment as Secretary of State in 2025. also serves as the Chairman of the Board of Directors for the Diamond State Port Corporation.

== Delaware Secretary of State ==
On December 11, 2024, Delaware Governor-elect Matt Meyer announced Patibanda-Sanchez as his nominee for the role of Secretary of State of Delaware. She was sworn in as the Secretary of State of Delaware by the Delaware Senate on January 28, 2025.

== Personal life ==
Patibanda-Sanchez resides in Pike Creek, Delaware, with her husband Marcos.

Political offices
Preceded by Jeffrey W. Bullock	Secretary of State of Delaware; 2025–present	Incumbent
