= 1984 Delaware gubernatorial election =

- November 6, 1984
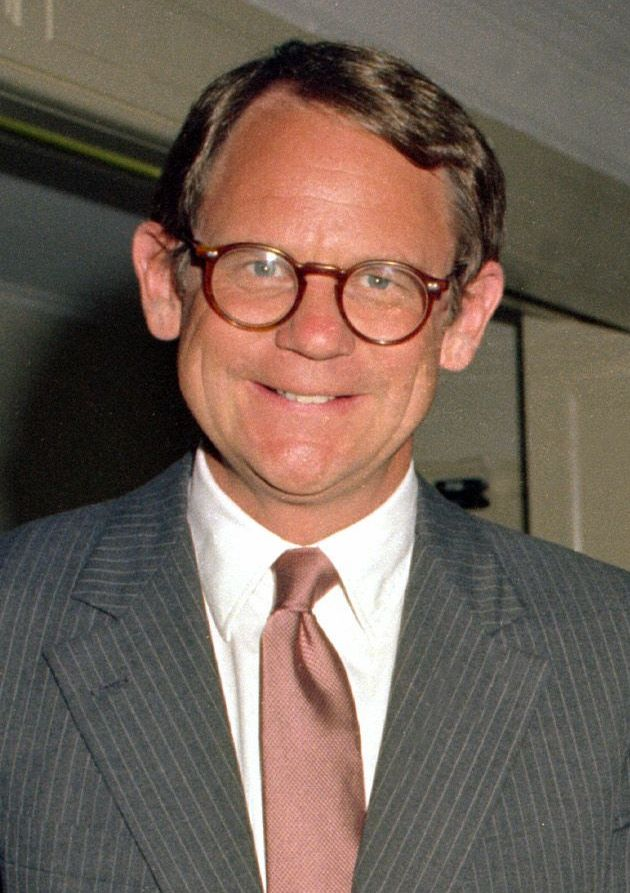

Nominee	Mike Castle	William T. Quillen
Party	Republican	Democratic
Popular vote	135,250	108,315
Percentage	55.53%	44.47%
- Castle: 50–60% 60–70% 70–80% Quillen: 50–60% 60–70% 80–90%
Governor before election
Pierre S. duPont IV
Republican
Elected Governor
Mike Castle
Republican

The 1984 Delaware gubernatorial election took place on November 6, 1984. Incumbent Republican governor Pierre S. duPont IV was barred from seeking a third term in office. Lieutenant Governor Mike Castle was elected to succeed him, defeating State Supreme Court Justice William T. Quillen.

This was the last time that a gubernatorial nominee and a lieutenant gubernatorial nominee of different political parties were elected simultaneously in Delaware.

== Results ==
1984 Delaware gubernatorial election
Party	Candidate	Votes	%	±%
Republican	Mike Castle	135,250	55.53%	
Democratic	William T. Quillen	108,315	44.47%	
Republican hold		Swing		

=== By county ===
County	Mike Castle Republican		William Quillen Democratic	
County	#	%	#	%
Kent	17,894	55.7%	14,234	44.3%
New Castle	93,393	54.5%	77,866	45.5%
Sussex	23,963	59.6%	16,215	40.4%
Totals	132,250	55.0%	108,315	45.0%
