= Gunning Bedford Jr. =

American Founding Father and judge

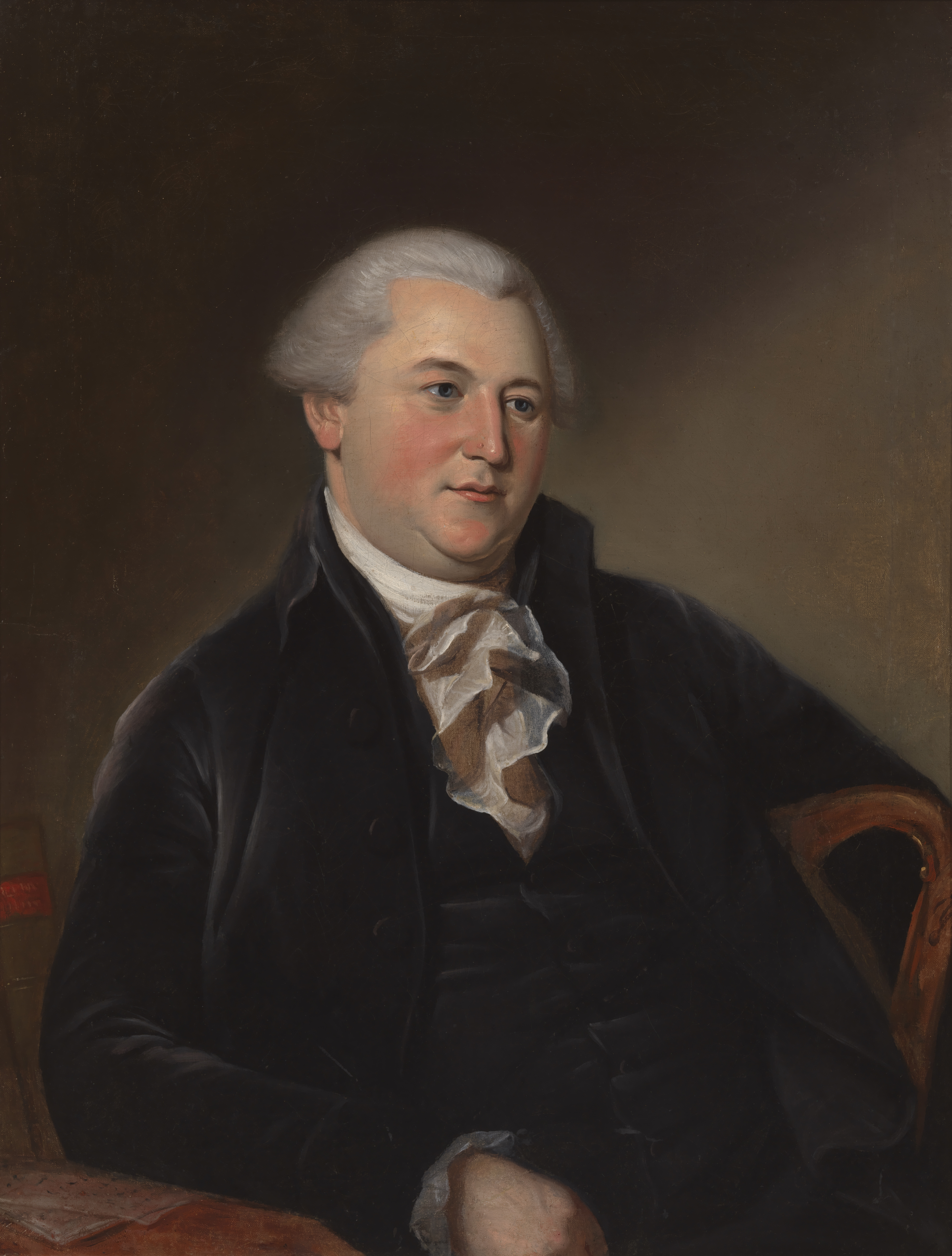
- Portrait by Charles Willson Peale, c. 1785–1795

Judge of the United States District Court for the District of Delaware
- In office September 26, 1789 – March 30, 1812
- Appointed by: George Washington
- Preceded by: Seat established by 1 Stat. 73
- Succeeded by: John Fisher

Delegate to the Continental Congress from Delaware
- In office October 26, 1784 – October 27, 1786
- In office February 1, 1783 – April 8, 1784

Personal details
- Born: Gunning Bedford Jr. 1747 Philadelphia, Province of Pennsylvania, British America
- Died: March 30, 1812 (aged 64–65) Wilmington, Delaware, U.S.
- Resting place: Wilmington and Brandywine Cemetery; Wilmington, Delaware
- Relatives: Gunning Bedford Sr.; Gertrude Franklin
- Education: Princeton University read law
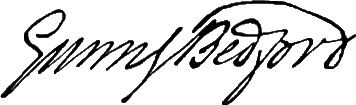
- Signature

Gunning Bedford Jr. (1747 – March 30, 1812) was an American Founding Father, delegate to the Congress of the Confederation (Continental Congress), Attorney General of Delaware, a delegate to the Constitutional Convention in 1787 which drafted the United States Constitution, a signer of the United States Constitution, and a United States district judge of the United States District Court for the District of Delaware.

== Education and career ==
Coat of arms of Gunning Bedford Jr.

Bedford was born in 1747, in Philadelphia, Province of Pennsylvania, British America, the fifth of eleven children to a wealthy family. He graduated from the College of New Jersey (now Princeton University) on September 25, 1771, with honors, as a classmate of James Madison. He was admitted to the Delaware bar and entered private practice in Dover from 1779 to 1783.

On July 17, 1775, the Second Continental Congress resolved to elect Bedford to deputy-muster-general for New York in the Continental Army, during the American Revolutionary War. On February 28, 1776, he was assigned to the northern army in Canada to muster troops there monthly. On June 18, 1776, he was promoted to muster-master-general and assigned to New York. He served briefly as an aide to General George Washington.

He was a delegate to the Congress of the Confederation from 1783 to 1785. He was Attorney General of Delaware from April 26, 1784, to September 26, 1789. He was appointed a commissioner to the Annapolis Convention in September 1786 but did not attend. He was a delegate to the Constitutional Convention in 1787, which drafted the United States Constitution and was a signer of the Constitution. During the convention, Bedford's threat, "the small ones would find some foreign ally of more honor and good faith, who will take them by the hand and do them justice" was shouted down as treasonous by the other delegates.

He was a member of the Delaware convention which ratified the Constitution in 1787. He was a member of the Delaware Legislative Council (now the Delaware Senate) in 1788, and was a candidate in the 1789 United States House of Representatives election for Delaware's at-large seat. Bedford was nominated by President George Washington on September 24, 1789, to the United States District Court for the District of Delaware, to a new seat authorized by 1 Stat. 73. He was confirmed by the United States Senate on September 26, 1789, and received his commission the same day. Bedford was a leading advocate for the abolition of slavery.

== Family ==
Bedford was a cousin of Gunning Bedford Sr., a Governor of Delaware. In late 1772 or early 1773, Bedford married Jane Ballareau Parker, the daughter of James Parker, a printer who had learned his trade from Benjamin Franklin. He had 5 children, none of whom married. In 1793, he purchased Lombardy Hall on 250 acres in Brandywine Hundred.

== Death and legacy ==
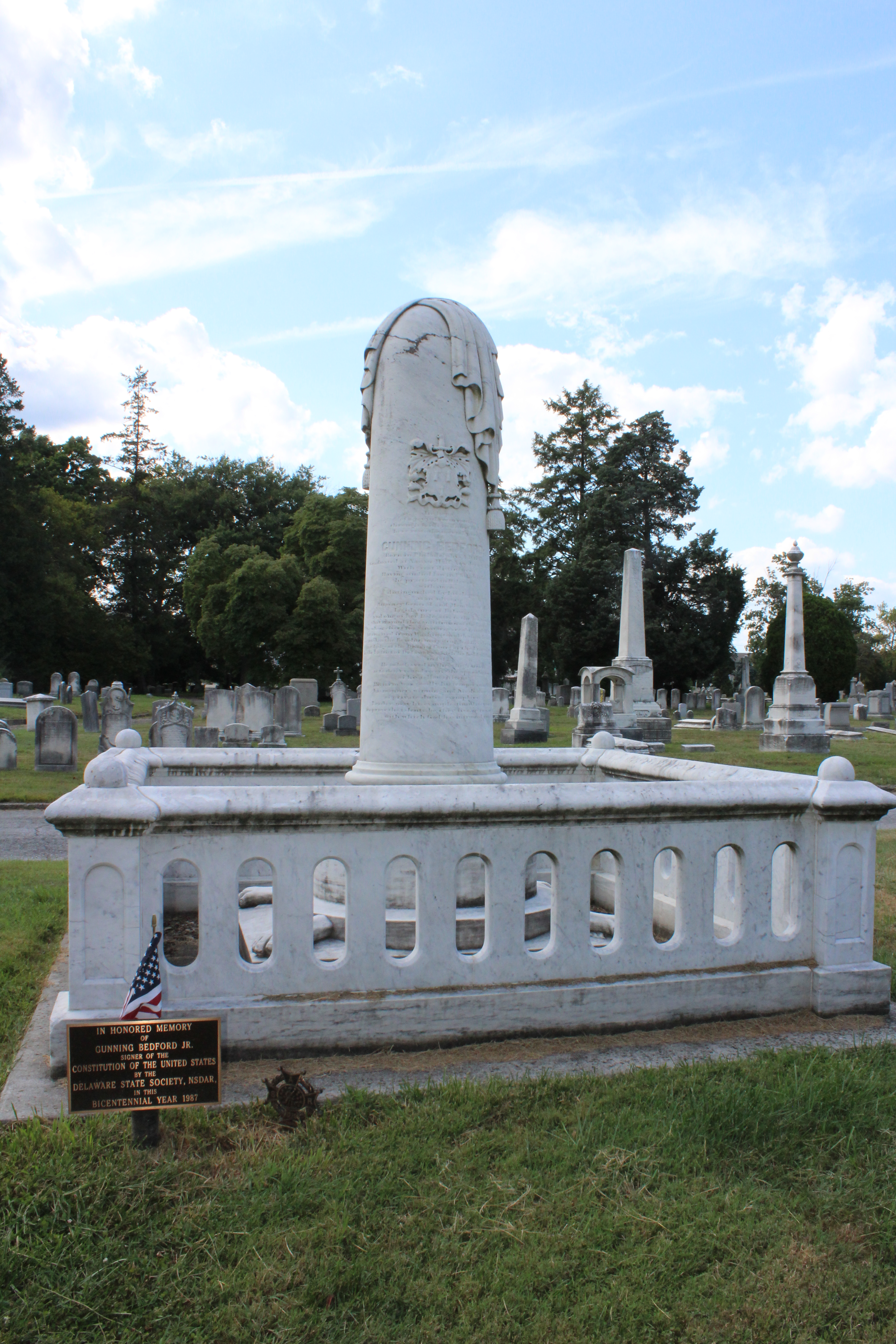
Gunning Bedford Jr. Memorial at Wilmington and Brandywine Cemetery

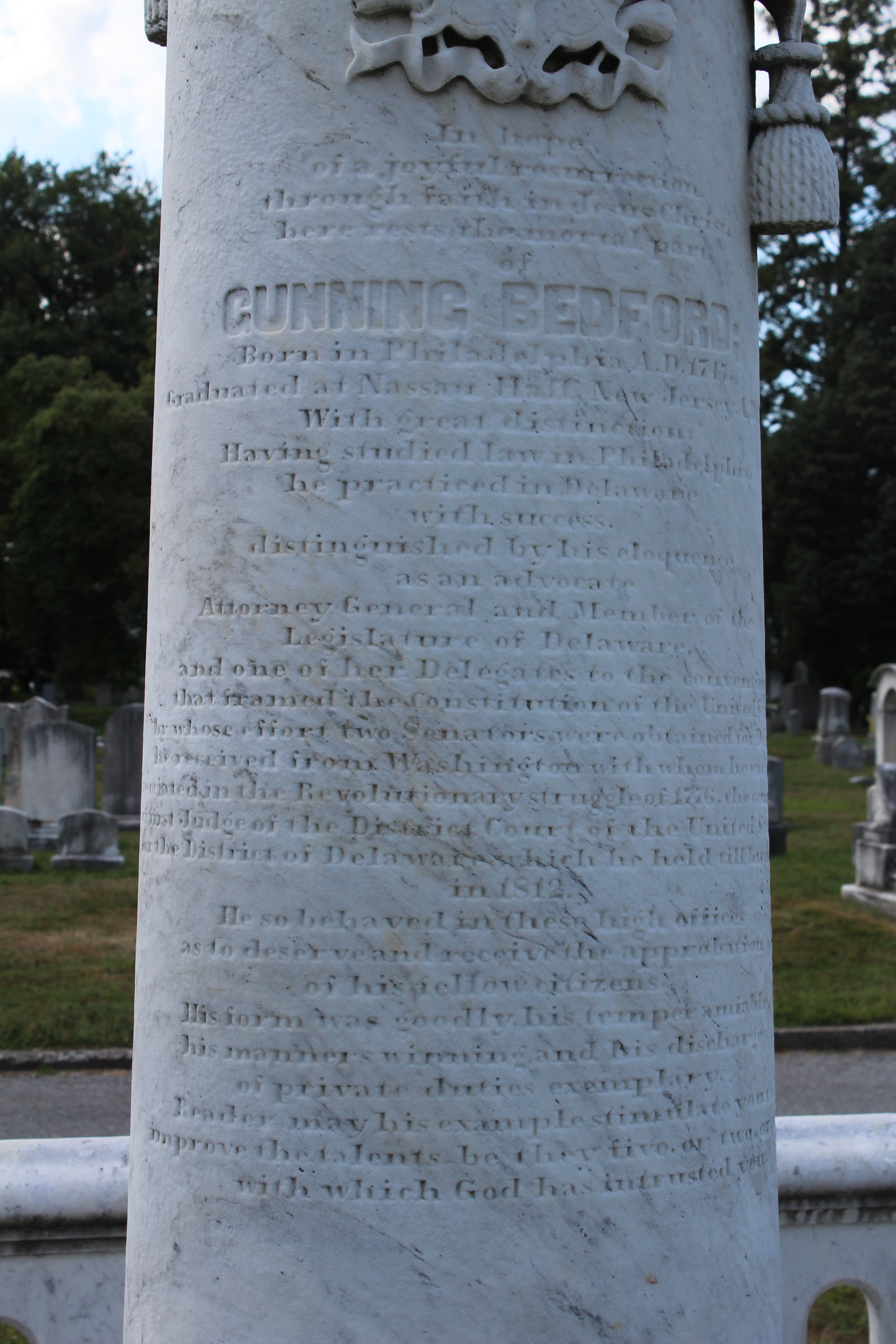
Close-up of Gunning Bedford Jr. Memorial

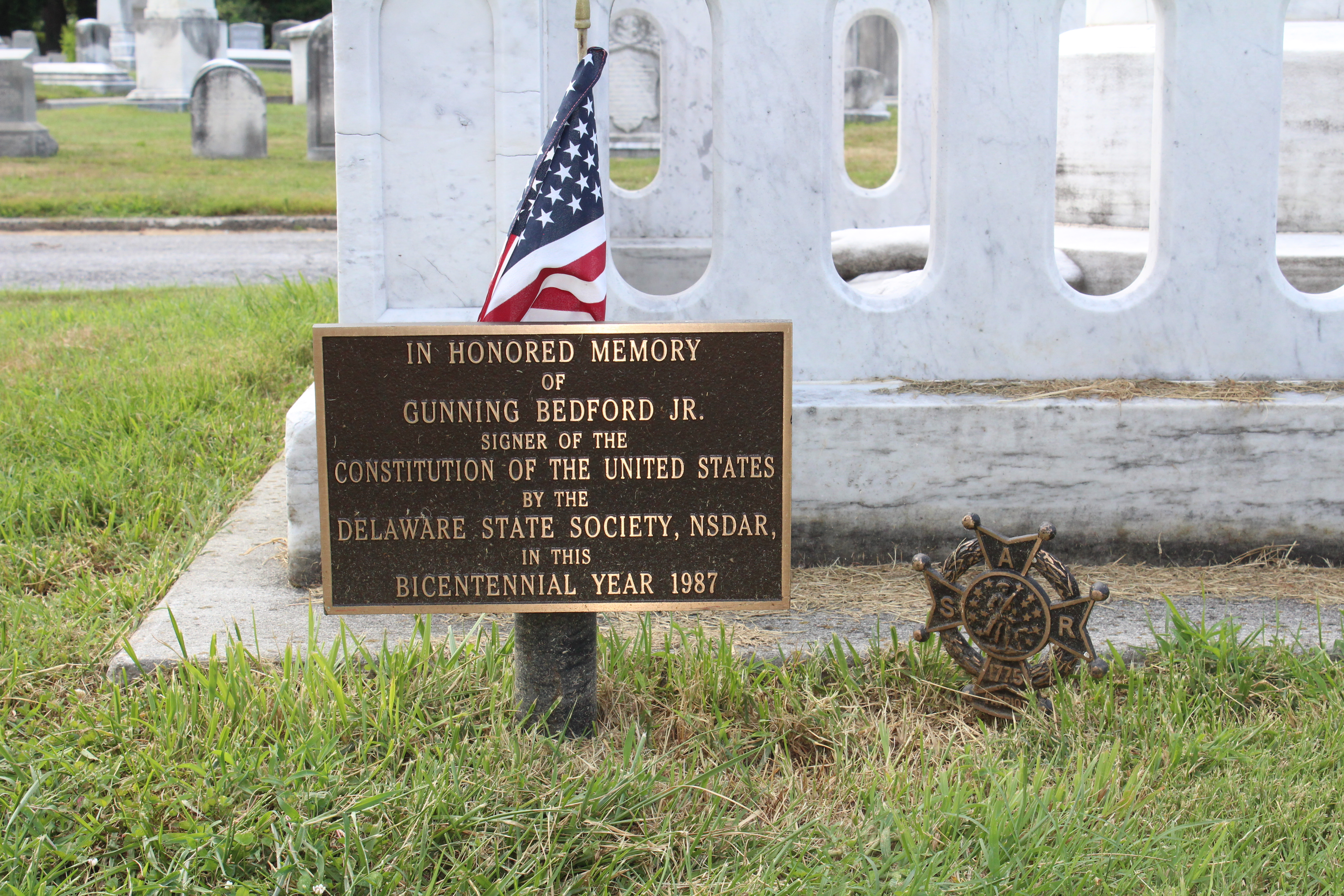
Close-up of plaque at base of Gunning Bedford Jr. Memorial

He died in office as a federal judge on March 30, 1812. He was interred first in the Presbyterian Cemetery in Wilmington. His remains were moved to the Masonic Home Cemetery at Christiana, Delaware. The cemetery is now the location of the Wilmington Institute Library.

== Notes ==
Legal offices
Preceded by Seat established by 1 Stat. 73	Judge of the United States District Court for the District of Delaware; 1789–1812	Succeeded by John Fisher
