= SS Willard Hall =

Liberty ship of WWII

History

United States
- Name: John Woolman, before 14 October 1942; Willard Hall, renamed 14 October 1942
- Namesake: John Woolman; Willard Hall
- Owner: War Shipping Administration (WSA)
- Operator: Stockard Steamship Corp.
- Ordered: as type (EC2-S-C1) hull, MCE hull 930
- Awarded: 30 January 1942
- Builder: Bethlehem-Fairfield Shipyard, Baltimore, Maryland
- Cost: $1,076,324
- Yard number: 2080
- Way number: 16
- Laid down: 29 November 1942
- Launched: 28 December 1942
- Completed: 11 January 1943
- Identification: Call sign: KKGE
- Fate: Laid up in Reserve Fleet, 14 June 1946, sold for scrap 22 March 1966

General characteristics
- Class & type: Liberty ship; type EC2-S-C1, standard
- Tonnage: 10,865 LT DWT; 7,176 GRT
- Displacement: 3,380 long tons (3,434 t) (light); 14,245 long tons (14,474 t) (max)
- Length: 441 feet 6 inches (135 m) oa; 416 feet (127 m) pp; 427 feet (130 m) lwl
- Beam: 57 feet (17 m)
- Draft: 27 ft 9.25 in (8.4646 m)
- Installed power: 2 × Oil fired 450 °F (232 °C) boilers, operating at 220 psi (1,500 kPa); 2,500 hp (1,900 kW)
- Propulsion: 1 × triple-expansion steam engine, (manufactured by Worthington Pump & Machinery Corp, Harrison, New Jersey); 1 × screw propeller
- Speed: 11.5 knots (21.3 km/h; 13.2 mph)
- Capacity: 562,608 cubic feet (15,931 m^{3}) (grain); 499,573 cubic feet (14,146 m^{3}) (bale)
- Complement: 38–62 USMM; 21–40 USNAG
- Armament: Varied by ship; Bow-mounted 3-inch (76 mm)/50-caliber gun; Stern-mounted 4-inch (102 mm)/50-caliber gun; 2–8 × single 20-millimeter (0.79 in) Oerlikon anti-aircraft (AA) cannons and/or, 2–8 × 37-millimeter (1.46 in) M1 AA guns

SS Willard Hall was a Liberty ship built in the United States during World War II. She was named after Willard Hall, a Delaware attorney and politician from Wilmington in New Castle County. He was a member of the Democratic-Republican Party, who served in the Delaware Senate, as a United States representative from Delaware and as a United States district judge of the United States District Court for the District of Delaware.

== Construction ==
Willard Hall was laid down on 29 November 1942, under a Maritime Commission (MARCOM) contract, MCE hull 930, by the Bethlehem-Fairfield Shipyard, Baltimore, Maryland; she was launched on 28 December 1942.

== History ==
She was allocated to the Stockard Steamship Corp., on 11 January 1943.

On 14 June 1946, she was laid up in the Hudson River Reserve Fleet, in Hoboken, New Jersey. On 5 December 1946, she was towed to Norfolk, Virginia, for an estimated $44,088 in repairs. On 6 January 1947, there was a pending sale to Marine Transport Line Inc., but on 9 January 1947, she was reallocated to Stockard SS Co. On 2 October 1947, she was laid up in the Wilmington Reserve Fleet in Wilmington, North Carolina. On 2 February 1966, she was sold to Union Minerals & Alloys Corp., for $46,400, to be scrapped.

== Bibliography ==
- "Bethlehem-Fairfield, Baltimore MD". www.ShipbuildingHistory.com. 7 August 2021.
- Maritime Administration. "Willard Hall". Ship History Database Vessel Status Card. U.S. Department of Transportation, Maritime Administration.
- Davies, James (May 2004). "Specifications (As-Built)" (PDF). p. 23.
- "SS Willard Hall".
