= Harriet Smith Windsor =

American politician

Secretary of State of Delaware
- In office January 3, 2001 – January 20, 2009
- Governor: Ruth Ann Minner
- Preceded by: Edward J. Freel
- Succeeded by: Jeffrey Bullock

Personal details
- Born: June 30, 1940 (age 86) Millsboro, Delaware, US
- Party: Democratic
- Education: Juniata College (BA); University of Delaware (MA, PhD)

Harriet N. Smith Windsor was the Delaware Secretary of State from 2001 through 2009. Windsor is a Democrat and currently services as the Vice Chair of the Delaware Democratic Party. In 2008 Windsor was an elector for Barack Obama.

== Early life and education ==
Windsor was born in Millsboro, Delaware. She earned a Bachelor of Arts from Juniata College before going on to obtain an M.A. and PhD from the University of Delaware.

== Political experience ==
Windsor served as Delaware Secretary of State from 2001 to 2009.

== Personal life ==
Windsor is married to Richard, and together they have two children named James and Julia. She lives in Lewes, Delaware. She is a member of the United Methodist Church.
