= Willard Hall =

American judge

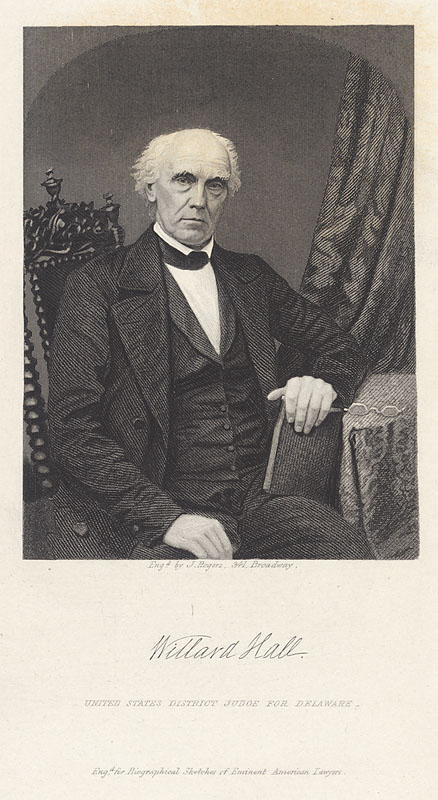

Judge of the U.S. District Court for the District of Delaware
- In office May 6, 1823 – December 6, 1871
- Appointed by: James Monroe
- Preceded by: John Fisher
- Succeeded by: Edward Green Bradford

Member of the U.S. House of Representatives from Delaware's at-large district
- In office March 4, 1817 – January 22, 1821
- Preceded by: Thomas Cooper
- Succeeded by: Caesar Augustus Rodney

Personal details
- Born: Willard Hall; December 24, 1780 Westford, Massachusetts
- Died: May 10, 1875 (aged 94) Wilmington, Delaware, US
- Resting place: Wilmington & Brandywine Cemetery, Wilmington, Delaware
- Party: Democratic-Republican
- Education: Harvard University read law

Willard Hall (December 24, 1780 – May 10, 1875), was a Delaware attorney and politician from Wilmington in New Castle County. He was a member of the Democratic-Republican Party, who served in the Delaware Senate, as a United States representative from Delaware and as a United States district judge of the United States District Court for the District of Delaware. He served as the first President of the Delaware Historical Society, was President of the state Bible society, and was instrumental in the formation of the Wilmington Savings Fund Society as a community bank, serving as its president for more than 40 years.

== Education and career ==
Born on December 24, 1780, in Westford, Massachusetts, Hall attended the public schools and Westford Academy. He graduated from Harvard University in 1799 and read law in 1803. He was admitted to the bar and entered private practice in Dover, Delaware, from 1803 to 1823. He was Secretary of State of Delaware from 1811 to 1814, and from 1821 to 1823.

== Congressional service ==
Hall was elected as a Democratic-Republican from Delaware's at-large congressional district to the United States House of Representatives of the 15th United States Congress. He was reelected to the 16th United States Congress and served from March 4, 1817, until January 22, 1821, when he resigned. He was an unsuccessful candidate in 1820 for reelection to the 17th United States Congress. He was a member of the Delaware Senate in 1822. He was the compiler of the Revised Code of Delaware in 1829. He was a delegate to the Delaware constitutional convention in 1821.

== Federal judicial service ==
Hall received a recess appointment from President James Monroe on May 6, 1823, to a seat on the United States District Court for the District of Delaware vacated by Judge John Fisher. He was nominated to the same position by President Monroe on December 5, 1823. He was confirmed by the United States Senate on December 9, 1823, and received his commission the same day. His service terminated on December 6, 1871, due to his retirement.

== Other service ==
Hall was President of the Wilmington School Board from 1852 to 1870. Hall was also the first President of the Delaware Historical Society. In September 1831, Hall was among twenty-five founding members elected to serve on the board of the newly formed Wilmington Savings Fund Society, a community bank designed to provide persons with only modest savings a safe place to deposit their funds. On October 1, 1831, Hall was elected president of the bank, a position he held until 1872, when he retired at the age of 92.

== Death ==
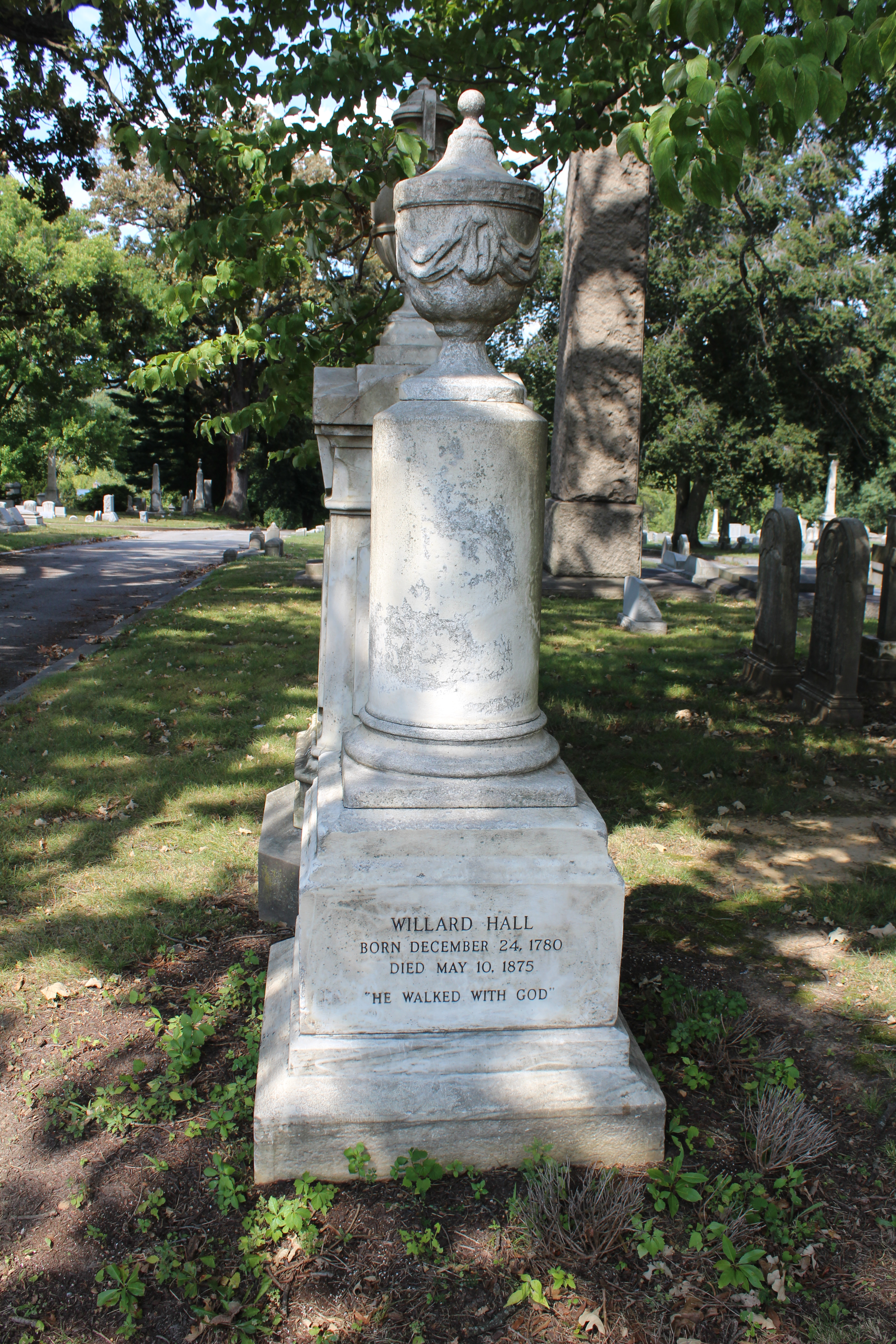
Willard Hall Grave in Wilmington and Brandywine Cemetery

Hall died on May 10, 1875, in Wilmington, Delaware, where he had moved in 1825. He was interred in the Wilmington and Brandywine Cemetery in Wilmington.

== Family ==
In 1806, Hall married Junia Killen, the daughter of Chancellor William Killen and they had a daughter, Lucinda. Junia died in 1826 and Hall married Harriet Hillyard.

== Religious service ==
Hall served as a ruling elder and Sunday School teacher in the Presbyterian Church.

== Legacy ==
The World War II Liberty Ship SS Willard Hall was named in his honor.

== Electoral history ==
Election results
| Year | Office | Subject | Party | votes | % | Opponent | Party | votes | % |
|---|---|---|---|---|---|---|---|---|---|
| 1814 | U.S. Representative | Willard Hall | Republican | 2,547 | 20% | Thomas Cooper | Federalist | 3,960 | 30% |
| 1816 | U.S. Representative | Willard Hall | Republican | 3,534 | 24% | Caleb Rodney | Federalist | 3,433 | 23% |
| 1818 | U.S. Representative | Willard Hall | Republican | 3,007 | 25% | Thomas Clayton | Federalist | 2,902 | 23% |
| 1820 | U.S. Representative | Willard Hall | Republican | 3,525 | 24% | Louis McLane | Federalist | 3,918 | 27% |

== See also ==
- List of United States federal judges by longevity of service

== Sources ==
- Conrad, Henry C. (1908). History of the State of Delaware. Lancaster, Pennsylvania: Wickersham Company.
- Hall, David Brainerd (1883). The Halls of New England: Genealogical and Biographical. Albany, New York: J. Munsell's Sons.
- Hoffecker, Carol E. (2004). Democracy in Delaware. Wilmington, Delaware: Cedar Tree Books. ISBN 1-892142-23-6.
- Martin, Roger A. (1984). A History of Delaware Through its Governors. Wilmington, Delaware: McClafferty Press.
- Scharf, John Thomas (1888). History of Delaware 1609–1888. 2 vols. Philadelphia: L. J. Richards & Co.
- Wilson, Emerson. (1969). Forgotten Heroes of Delaware. Cambridge, Massachusetts: Deltos Publishing Company.

== Places with more information ==
- Delaware Historical Society; website; 505 North Market Street, Wilmington, Delaware 19801; (302) 655-7161.
- University of Delaware; Library website; 181 South College Avenue, Newark, Delaware 19717; (302) 831–2965.

U.S. House of Representatives
| Preceded by Thomas Cooper | Member of the U.S. House of Representatives from Delaware's at-large congressional district 1817–1821 | Succeeded by Caesar Augustus Rodney |
Legal offices
| Preceded by John Fisher | Judge of the U.S. District Court for the District of Delaware; 1823–1871 | Succeeded by Edward Green Bradford |
