= Old First Presbyterian Church (Wilmington, Delaware) =

Historic church in Delaware, United States

- Old First Presbyterian Church of Wilmington
- U.S. National Register of Historic Places
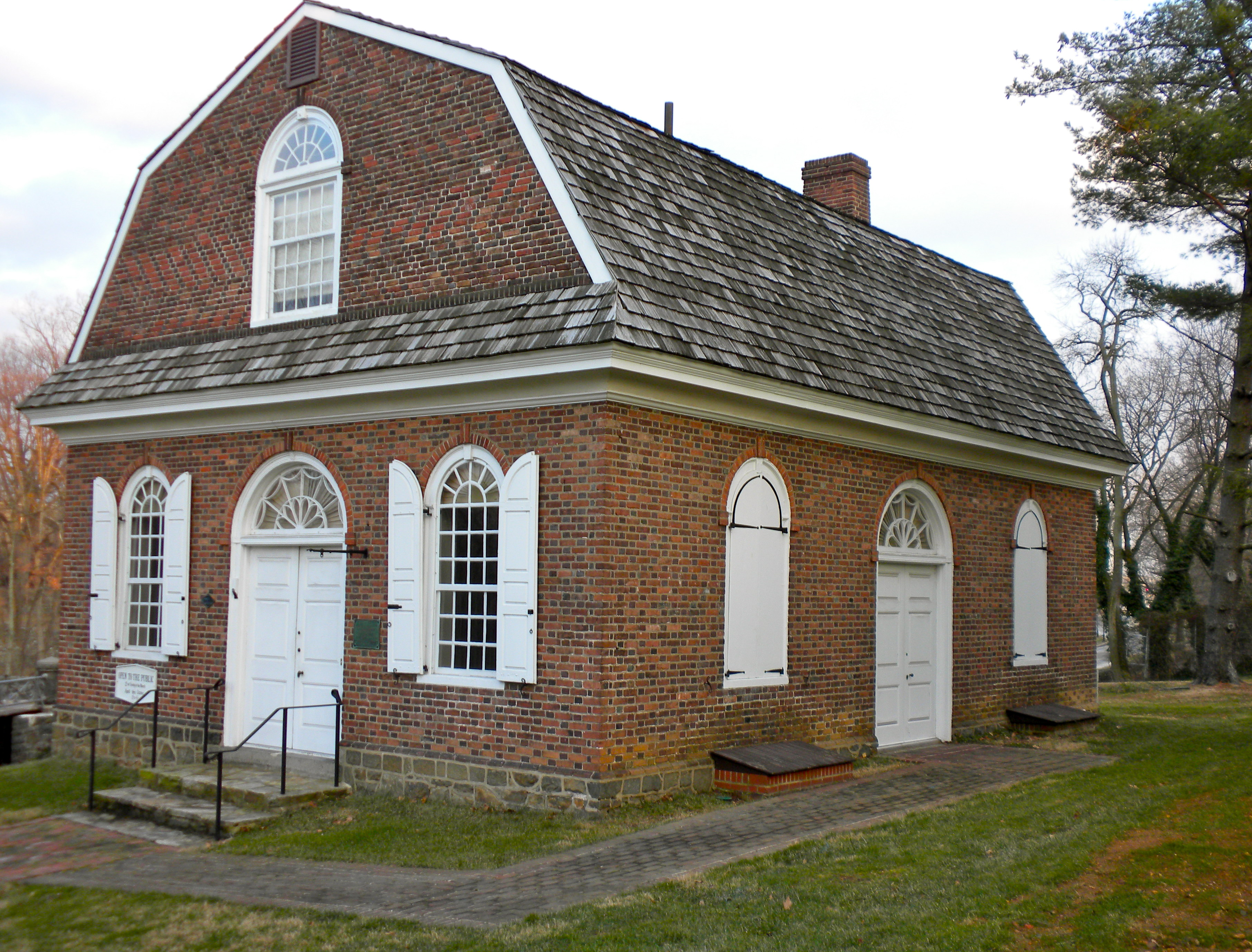
- Old First Presbyterian Church of Wilmington, January 2010

- Location within Delaware Location within the United States
- Location: West St. on Brandywine Park Dr., in the Wilmington, Delaware, neighborhood of Midtown Brandywine
- Coordinates: 39.750772°N 75.547472°W
- Area: 1 acre (0.40 ha)
- Built: 1740
- NRHP reference No.: 72000295
- Added to NRHP: April 13, 1972

Old First Presbyterian Church of Wilmington is a historic Presbyterian church located on West Street on Brandywine Park Drive in Wilmington, New Castle County, Delaware.

Built in 1740, the one-story brick structure measures 30 feet by 40 feet and has a gambrel roof. Originally located on the east side of Wilmington's Market Street between 9th and 10th Streets, the building was used during the American Revolution by British troops as a prison and hospital during the occupation of Wilmington after the Battle of Brandywine, September 12, 1777. It remained a house of worship until 1840. A cemetery on the site was the final resting place of many noted Wilmingtonians which were reinterred to Wilmington and Brandywine Cemetery and Riverview Cemetery.

It was moved to its present site in 1916. In order to move it, it was dismantled and rebuilt with its re-dedication in 1918. It was given to the National Society of the Colonial Dames of America in the State of Delaware to maintain and restore. They currently [when?] use it as their headquarters and have it open to the public on 2nd Sundays, April–October, 2-4pm.

It was added to the National Register of Historic Places in 1972. The National Society of the Colonial Dames of America restored the interior to its original condition in 1981.
