= Jeffrey W. Bullock =

American politician

Jeffrey Bullock
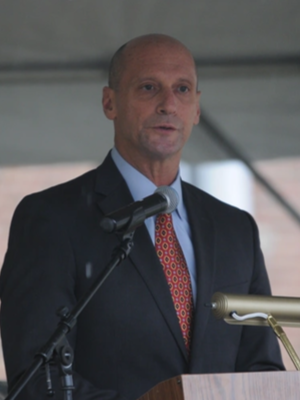

Secretary of State of Delaware
- In office January 20, 2009 – January 28, 2025
- Governor: Jack Markell; John Carney; Bethany Hall-Long; Matt Meyer
- Preceded by: Harriet Smith Windsor
- Succeeded by: Charuni Patibanda-Sanchez

Personal details
- Born: July 1960 (age 65) Claymont, Delaware, U.S.
- Party: Democratic
- Education: University of Delaware (BA)

Jeffrey W. Bullock is an American politician and former Secretary of State of Delaware.

== Biography ==
Bullock is from Claymont, Delaware. He holds a degree from the University of Delaware in economics and political science.

Bullock served as chief of staff under Tom Carper when he was Governor of Delaware. In 2006, New Castle county executive Chris Coons appointed Bullock to be the county's chief administrative officer. Governor Jack Markell appointed Bullock as Secretary of State in January 2009. In 2024, governor-elect Matt Meyer announced he would appoint Charuni Patibanda-Sanchez to replace Bullock as secretary of state.

Political offices
Preceded by Harriet Smith Windsor	Secretary of State of Delaware; 2009–2025	Succeeded by Charuni Patibanda-Sanchez
