= Riverview Cemetery (Wilmington, Delaware) =

Historic cemetery in Wilmington, Delaware, US

- U.S. National Register of Historic Places
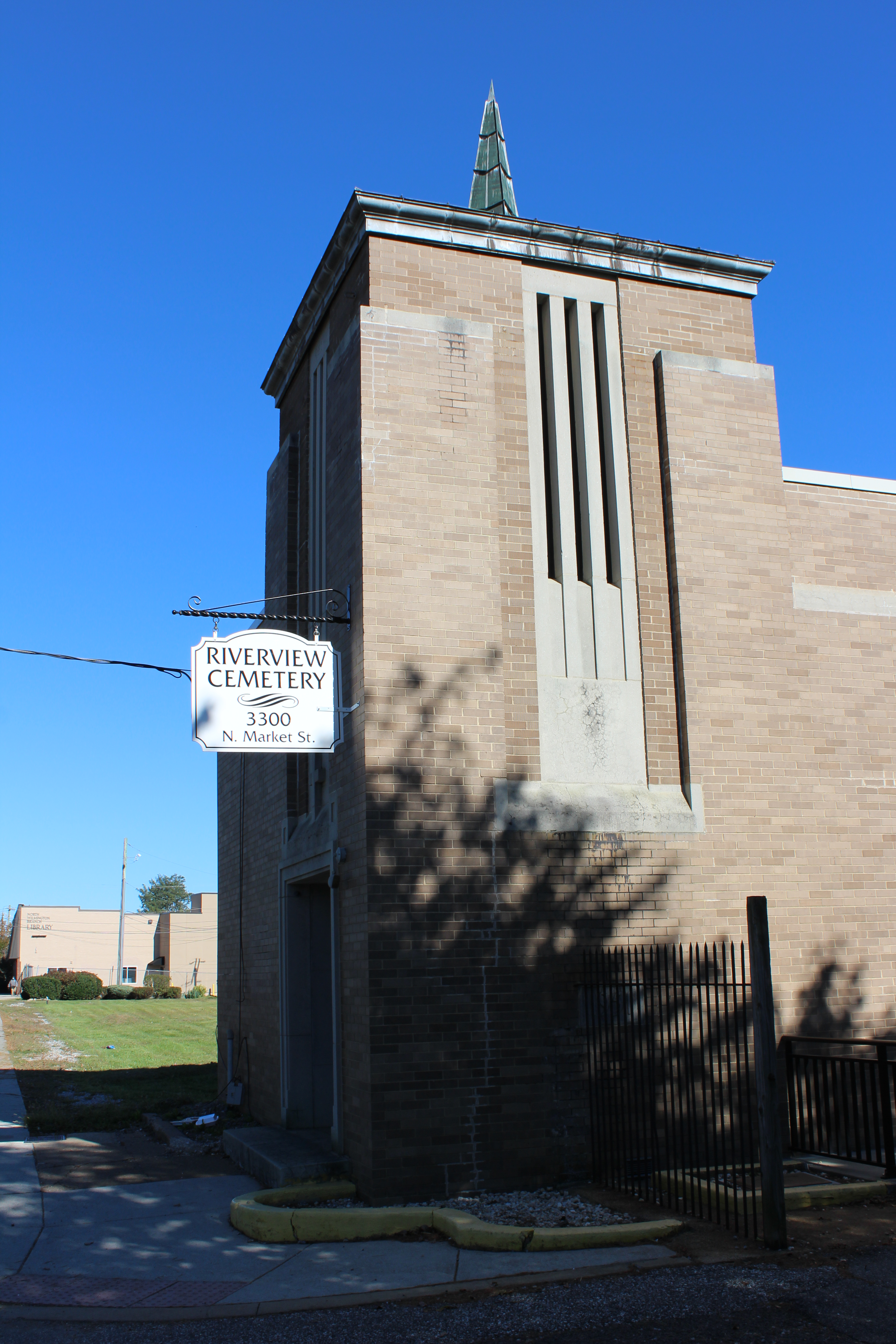
- Riverview Cemetery Entranceway sign

- Location within Delaware Location within the United States
- Location: 3300 North Market Street, Wilmington, Delaware, U.S.
- Coordinates: 39°45′27″N 75°31′42″W
- Area: 42 acres (17 ha)
- Website: www.riverviewcem.com
- NRHP reference No.: 12000378
- Added to NRHP: July 3, 2012

Riverview Cemetery is a historic cemetery located at 3300 North Market Street in Wilmington, Delaware.

== Description ==
The cemetery is 42 acres in size and contains over 36,000 burials. The cemetery was founded in 1872 by a consortium of eighteen fraternal organizations of the Independent Order of Odd Fellows and the Knights of Pythias. It is currently owned and operated by the Friends of Historic Riverview Cemetery.

The cemetery consists of two plots intersected by North Market Street. The southeast section consists of a long, roughly rectangular plot and the landscaping of this area was designed by Herman J. Schwarzmann. It is the only known example of his work in Delaware. The northeast section of the cemetery is a trapezoidal shaped parcel that was purchased in 1899 and laid out by the cemetery's superintendent, Goldsmith C. Nailor. The northeast section contains the state's first community mausoleum, a Classical Revival structure built in 1917 to a pattern design by the American Mausoleum Company of Clyde, Ohio.

Riverview Cemetery received two patents; one in 1921 for the manufacture of cement vaults and a second in 1922 for a joint that prevented moisture seepage into cement vaults. In 1921, the First and Central Presbyterian church in Rodney Square was demolished and half of the burials in the graveyard were moved to section G of Riverview Cemetery.

There are 35 American Civil War veterans buried in Riverview Cemetery.

In the 1950s, Riverview Cemetery was the first cemetery in Delaware to be racially integrated.

A chapel and office was built near the entrance to the cemetery in 1951 and was renovated into a visitor and information center in 2018.

The cemetery was added to the National Register of Historic Places in 2012.

== Notable burials ==
- William L. Carlisle (1890-1964), train robber of the American West
- Richard McMullen (1868–1944), Delaware Governor
- John Shilling (1832–1884), American Civil War Medal of Honor recipient
- George Lovington "Sassafrass" Winter (1878–1951), Major League Baseball pitcher

== Gallery ==
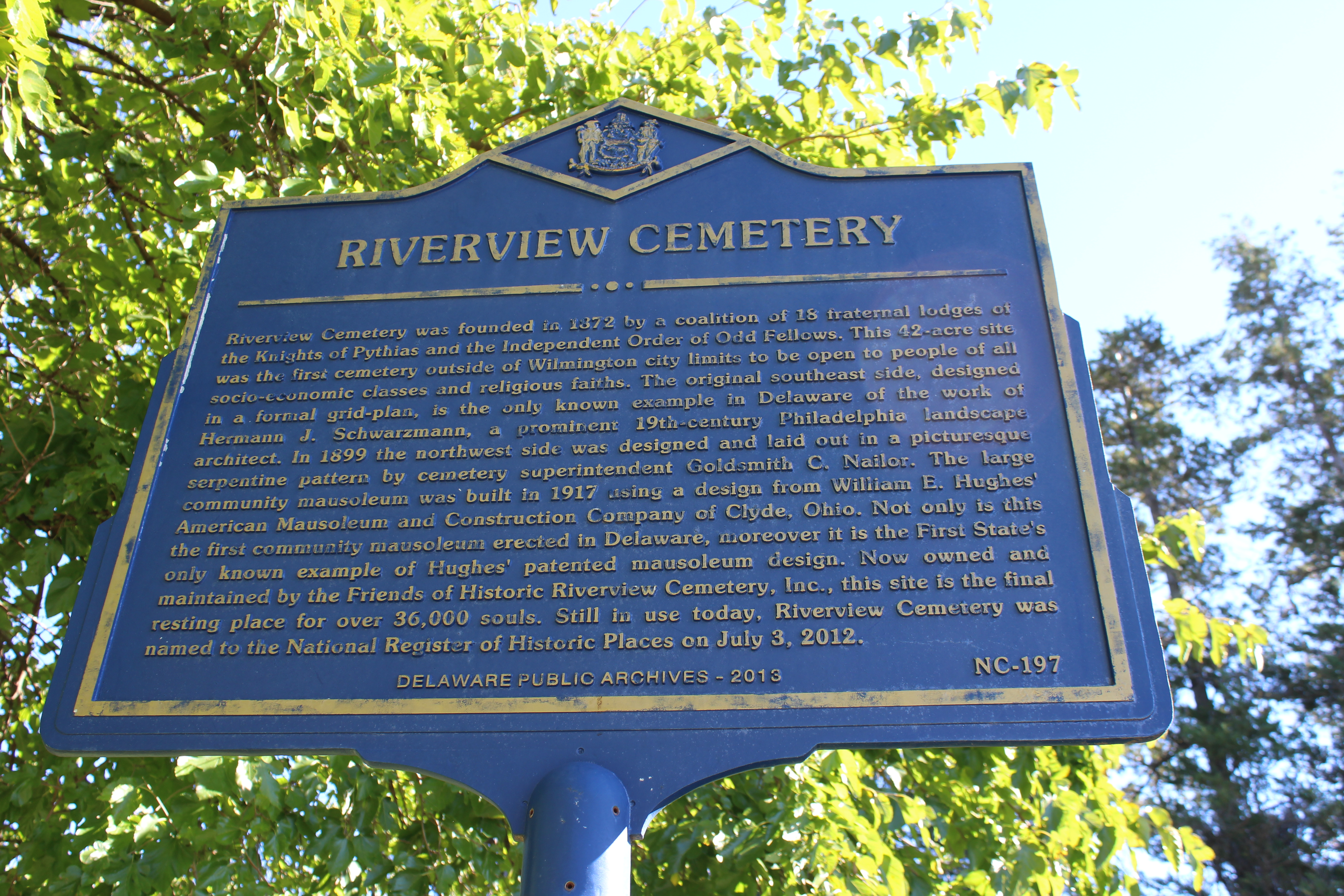
Historical Marker

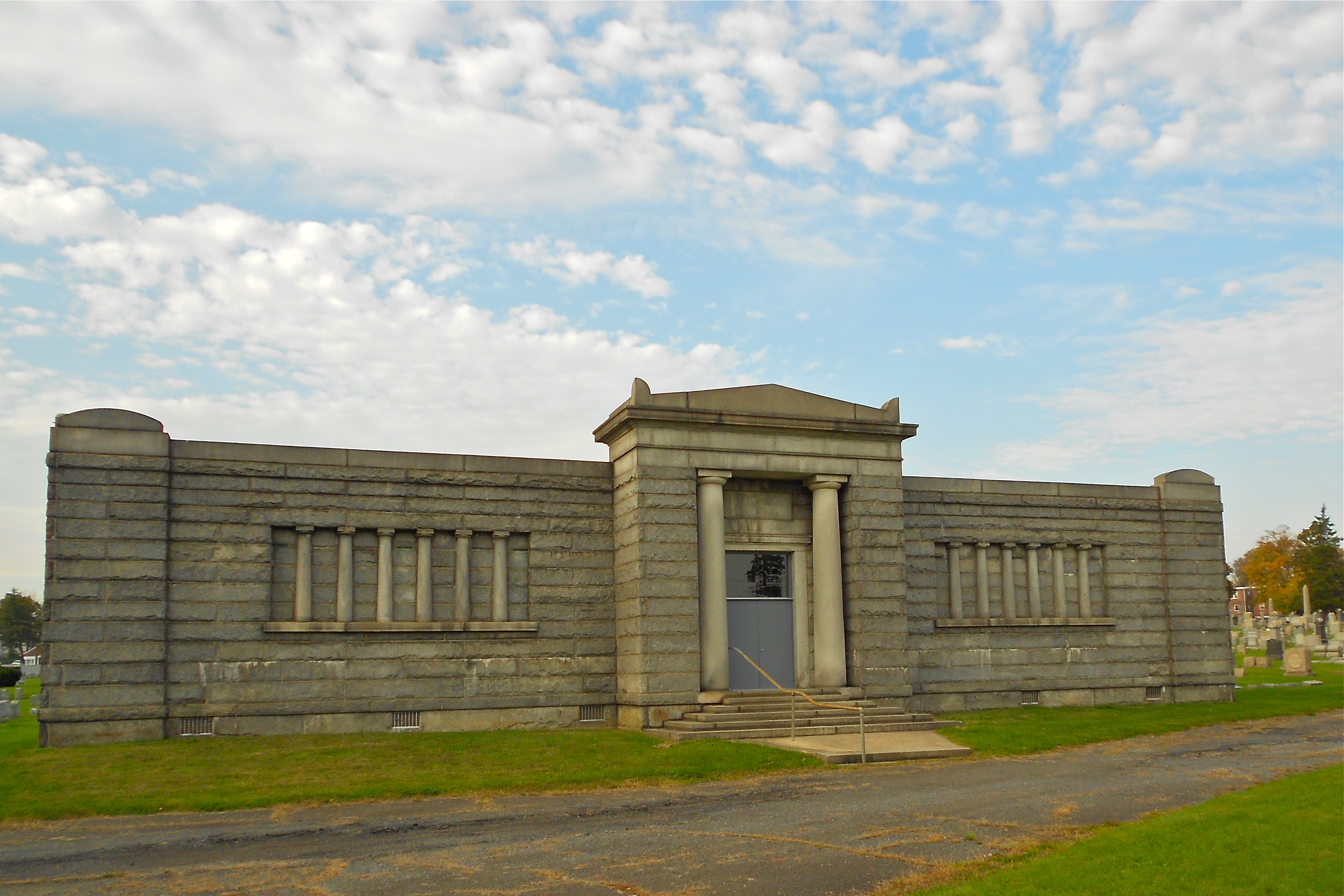
Community mausoleum

== See also ==
- National Register of Historic Places listings in Wilmington, Delaware
