= Daniel Moore Bates =

American lawyer

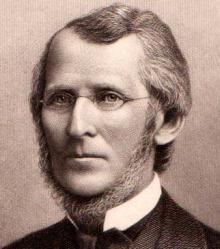

United States Attorney for the District of Delaware
- In office 1855–1861
- President: Franklin Pierce; James Buchanan
- Preceded by: Thomas F. Bayard
- Succeeded by: Edward Green Bradford

Secretary of State of Delaware
- In office 1847–1851
- Appointed by: William Tharp
- Preceded by: George P. Fisher
- Succeeded by: Alfred P. Robinson

Personal details
- Born: Daniel Elzey Moore; January 28, 1821 Laurel, Delaware
- Died: March 28, 1879 (aged 58) Richmond, Virginia
- Party: Democratic
- Spouse: Margaret Handy (married 1844; died 1869)
- Education: Dickinson College (1839); Dickinson College (1869) (honorary doctorate)
- Occupation: Lawyer politician

Daniel Moore Bates (January 28, 1821 – March 28, 1879) was an American lawyer who served as the U.S. Attorney for the District of Delaware. He also served as the Secretary of State of Delaware amongst other positions.

== Early life ==
Daniel Moore Bates was born Daniel Elzey Moore in Laurel, Delaware on January 28, 1821. The son of a Maryland Methodist minister Jacob Moore. His mother died when he was young and his father died when he was only eight. He was adopted by, Martin Waltham Bates and Mary Hillyard Bates a lawyer and housewife from Dover, Delaware. They became his family and he took their last name, becoming Daniel Moore Bates. The Bates were an influential and wealthy couple, and with their help, Daniel enrolled in Dickinson College when he was fourteen graduating in 1839.

== Career ==
He went back to Dover and became a member of the bar there in 1842, after studying law under his father. He began his career in his father's law firm. In 1843, he was a founding member of the State Colonization Society of Delaware, an organization encouraging repatriation of African Americans to Africa. Governor William Tharp, named him Secretary of State for Delaware in January 1847 a position he held until 1851 (the end of Tharp's term). In 1855, President Franklin Pierce appointed him as the United States Attorney for the district of Delaware and he stayed in this post until 1861. After his appointment he went to Europe to deal with some medical issues, something he would do again later in life. He was one of the Delaware commissioners dispatched to a Peace Conference in February 1861 attempting to avoid the breakup of the Union and the Confederacy's formation. He was one of nine that offered a plan to appease the southern states. After the Civil War, he was named unanimously to fill the post of chancellor of the Delaware and served in that post until 1873.

== Personal life ==
Bates married Margaret Handy of Snow Hill, Maryland on November 7, 1844. The couple had 5 children. In 1869, he was awarded by Dickinson College with an Honorary Doctorate. His wife died in October 1869. In March 1879, he was traveling to a court case in Richmond, Virginia, when he became sick and, after two weeks with the illness, he died on March 28, 1879.
