= Michael Ratchford (politician) =

American politician

Secretary of State of Delaware
- In office 1992–1993
- Governor: Mike Castle
- Preceded by: Michael E. Harkins
- Succeeded by: William T. Quillen

Michael Ratchford is an American politician. He served as Secretary of State of Delaware in 1992 during the administration of Gov. Michael Castle.
