= Fannie Herrington =

American politician

Fannie S. Herrington (1869–1931) buried at Barratt's Chapel. She was Secretary of State of Delaware from November 1925 until March 1926. She was the second wife of Dr. Caleb R. Layton, married October 2, 1926.
