= William T. Quillen =

American judge from Delaware (1935–2016)

The Honorable William T. Quillen

Secretary of State of Delaware
- In office 1993–1994
- Governor: Tom Carper
- Preceded by: Michael Ratchford
- Succeeded by: Edward J. Freel

Personal details
- Born: January 15, 1935
- Died: August 19, 2016 (aged 81)
- Children: Carol and Tracey
- Relatives: John Carney (son-in-law)

Associate Justice of the Delaware Supreme Court
- In office October 30, 1978 – February 28, 1983
- Nominated by: Charles L. Terry Jr.
- In office November 23, 1994 – August 30, 2000
- Nominated by: Tom Carper

William Tatem Quillen (January 15, 1935 – August 19, 2016) was an American politician and jurist from Delaware. He served on the Delaware Supreme Court from 1978 to 1983, and as Secretary of State of Delaware from 1993 to 1994, during the administration of Governor Tom Carper. His older daughter, Carol Quillen, was the first female president of Davidson College. His younger daughter, Tracey Carney, is married to former Governor and current Wilmington Mayor John Carney.

He earned degrees from Williams College (BA), Harvard Law School (LLB), and University of Virginia School of Law (LLM).

Political offices
| Preceded by Michael Ratchford | Secretary of State of Delaware; 1993–1994 | Succeeded by Edward J. Freel |
Party political offices
| Preceded by William J. Gordy | Democratic nominee for Governor of Delaware; 1984 | Succeeded by Jacob Kreshtool |
