= Edward J. Freel =

American politician

The Honorable Edward J. Freel

Secretary of State of Delaware
- In office 1994–2001
- Governor: Tom Carper
- Preceded by: William T. Quillen
- Succeeded by: Harriet Smith Windsor

Personal details
- Education: University of Delaware

Edward J. Freel is an American politician. He served as Secretary of State of Delaware from 1994 to 2001, during the administration of Gov. Tom Carper. He has received degrees from Gannon University and the University of Delaware, where he is currently a Senior Fellow for the Institute for Public Administration.
