= John Fisher (Delaware judge) =

American judge (1771–1823)

Judge of the United States District Court for the District of Delaware
- In office April 23, 1812 – April 22, 1823
- Appointed by: James Madison
- Preceded by: Gunning Bedford Jr.
- Succeeded by: Willard Hall

Personal details
- Born: John Fisher; May 22, 1771 Lewes, Delaware Colony, Province of Pennsylvania, British America
- Died: April 22, 1823 (aged 51) Smyrna, Delaware, US
- Education: read law

John Fisher (May 22, 1771 – April 22, 1823) was a United States district judge of the United States District Court for the District of Delaware.

== Education and career ==
Born on May 22, 1771, near Lewes, Delaware Colony, province of Pennsylvania, British America, Fisher read law in 1791. He entered private practice in Dover, Delaware from 1791 to 1812. He was clerk for the Delaware General Assembly. He was Secretary of State of Delaware starting in 1802, and again starting in 1811.

== Federal judicial service ==
Fisher was nominated by President James Madison on April 22, 1812, to a seat on the United States District Court for the District of Delaware vacated by Judge Gunning Bedford Jr. He was confirmed by the United States Senate on April 23, 1812, and received his commission the same day. His service terminated on April 22, 1823, due to his death in Smyrna, Delaware.

== Sources ==
Legal offices
Preceded by Gunning Bedford Jr.	Judge of the United States District Court for the District of Delaware; 1812–1823	Succeeded by Willard Hall
