= Wilmington and Brandywine Cemetery =

Cemetery in Wilmington, Delaware

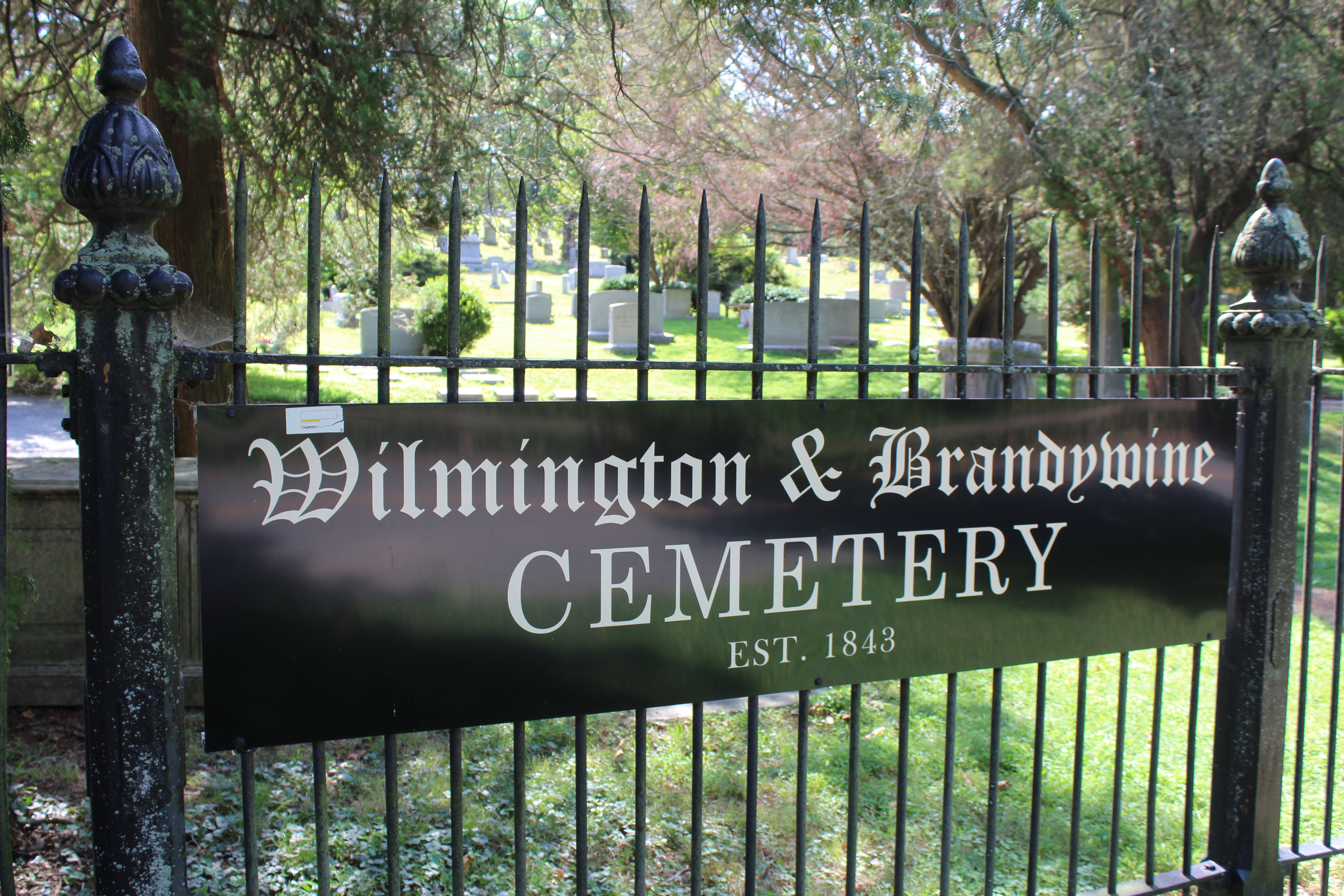
- Interactive map of Wilmington and Brandywine Cemetery

Details
- Established: 1843
- Location: 701 Delaware Avenue, Wilmington, Delaware
- Country: United States
- Coordinates: 39.7508°N 75.5533°W
- Type: private
- Size: 25 acres
- No. of graves: 21,000+
- Website: http://wilmingtonbrandywinecemetery.org/
- Find a Grave: Wilmington and Brandywine Cemetery

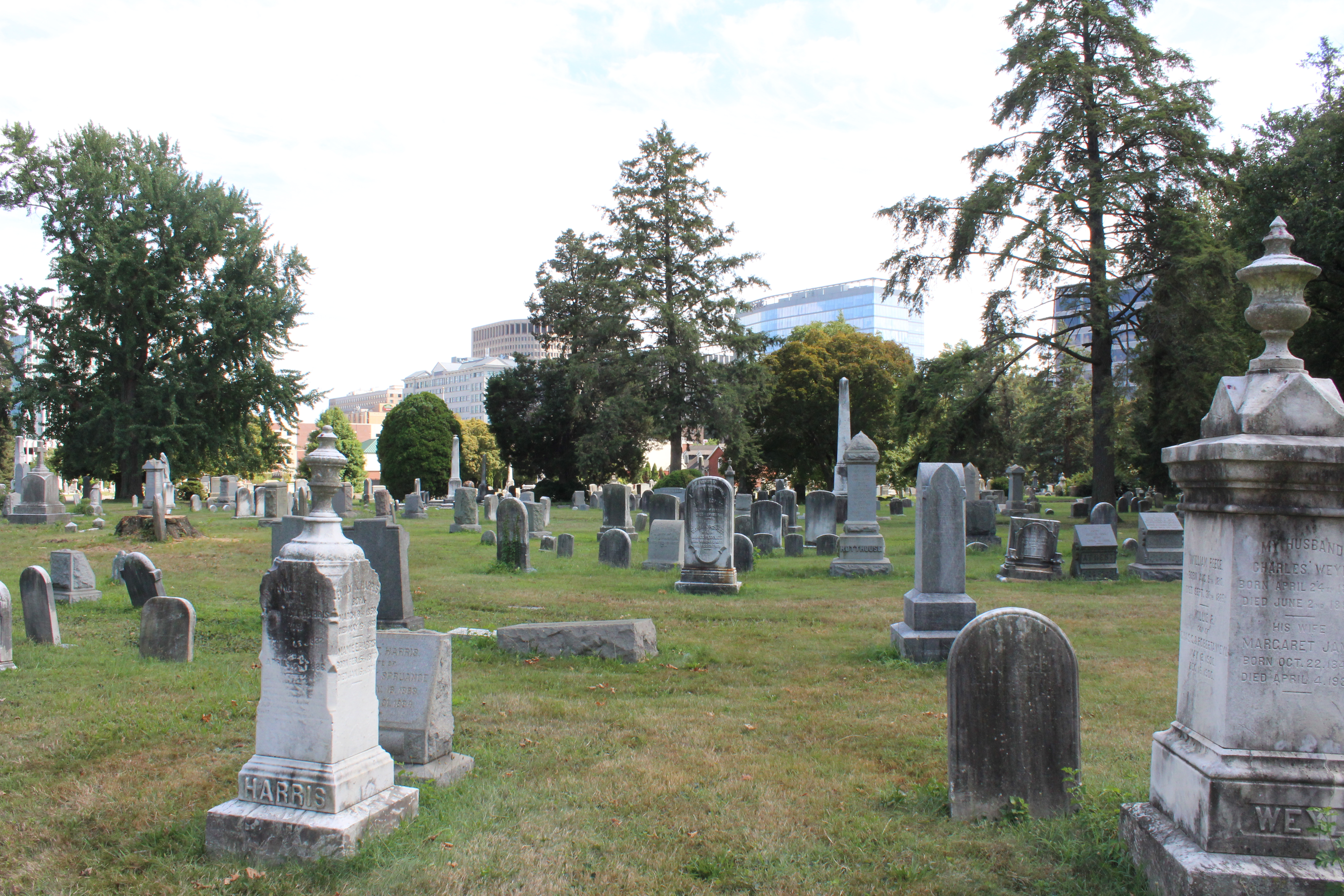
Wilmington and Brandywine Cemetery

Wilmington and Brandywine Cemetery is a rural cemetery at 701 Delaware Avenue in Wilmington, Delaware. Founded in 1843, it contains over 21,000 burials on about 25 acres.

== History ==
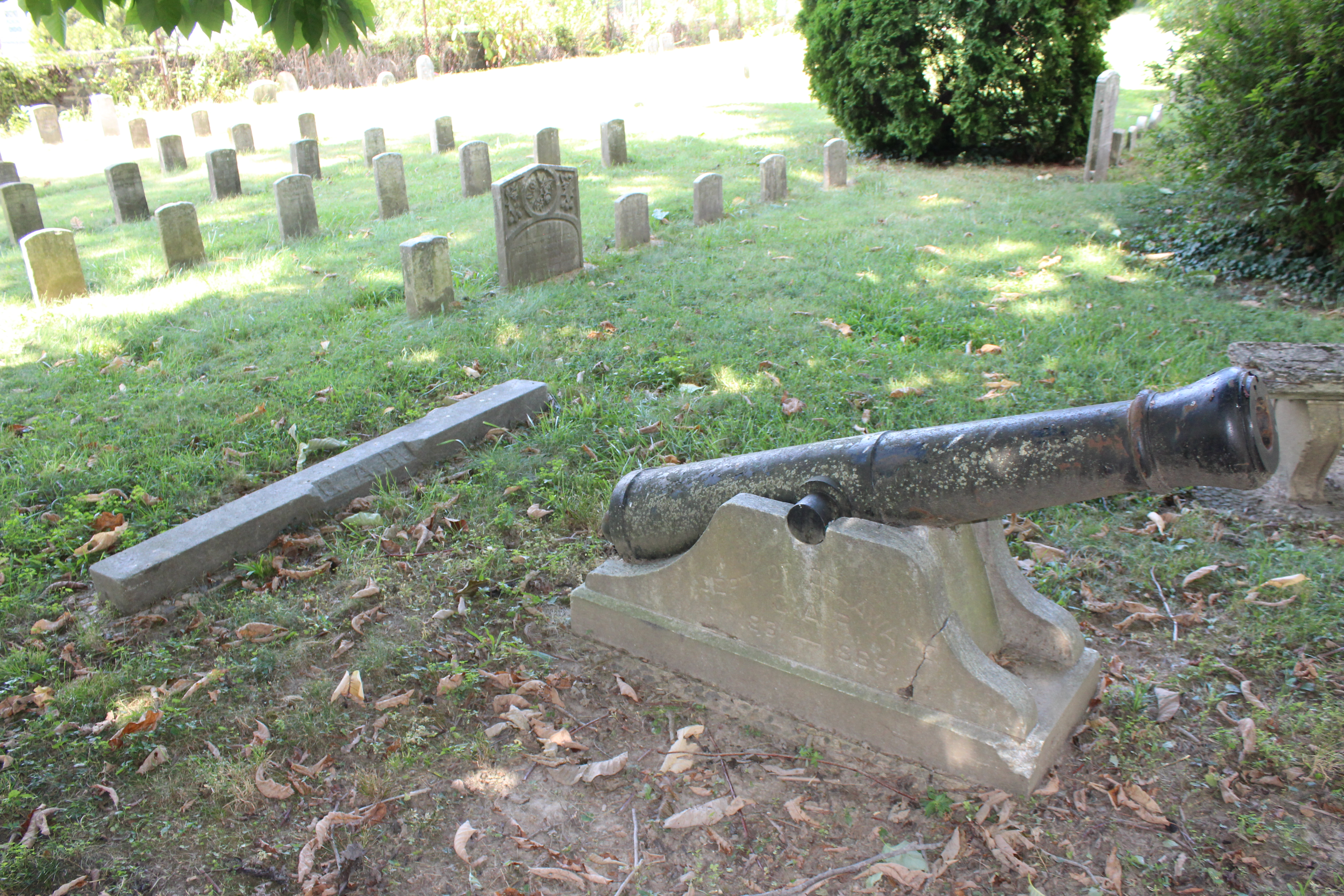
Soldier's Graveplot where 121 U.S. Civil War soldiers are buried

The cemetery was envisioned in 1843 by Sam Wollaston, who sought to establish one of Delaware's first non-sectarian cemeteries on 10 acres of his farm, which was outside the city of Wilmington at the time. His venture was quickly a success, and the following year, Wollaston formed a company to expand and landscape the site with Willard Hall serving as president. Engineer George Read Riddle was hired to design the cemetery. In 1850, James Canby planted an imported cedar of Lebanon at the entrance of the cemetery.

One corner of the cemetery, named Soldier's Graveplot, contains the remains of 121 U.S. Civil War soldiers who died from their wounds or war-related illnesses at the old Delaware Hospital.

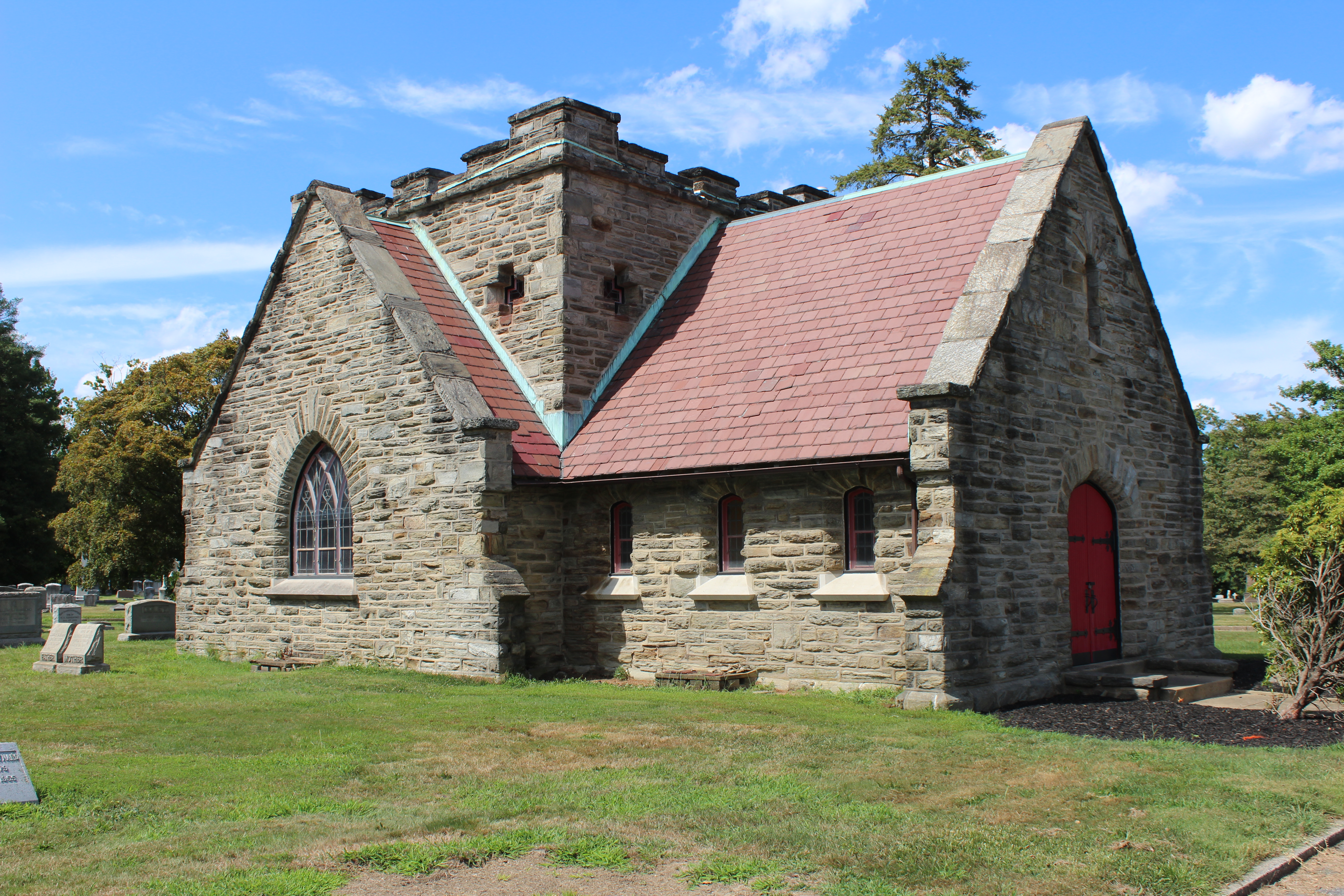
Chapel at Wilmington and Brandywine Cemetery, August 2019

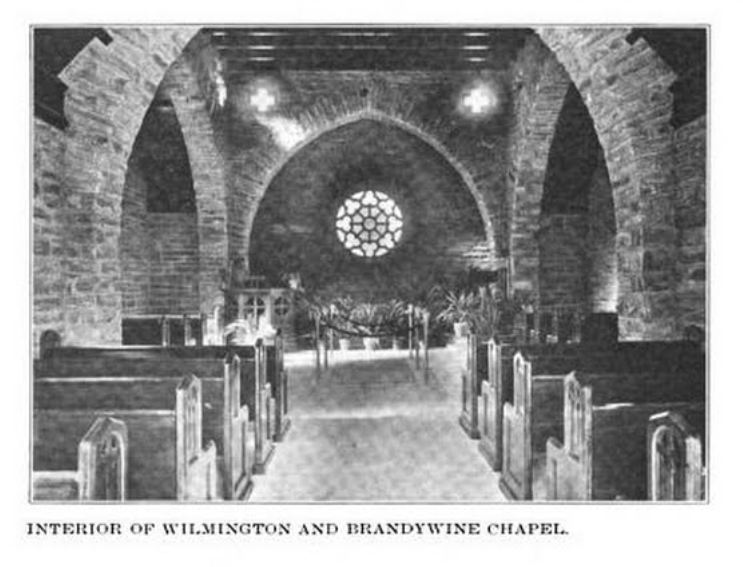
Interior of chapel June 1914

The cemetery's chapel, designed by architect Elijah Dallett Jr., was built in 1913 of Foxcroft stone with window sills of Indiana limestone.

In 1917, the cemetery received remains originally interred at the 18th-century First Presbyterian Church in Wilmington's Rodney Square. The church was moved to Park Drive to make room for a new library.

In 2014, the cemetery launched the Eternal Rest 5K Walk/Run to raise money to maintain the cemetery.

== Notable burials ==
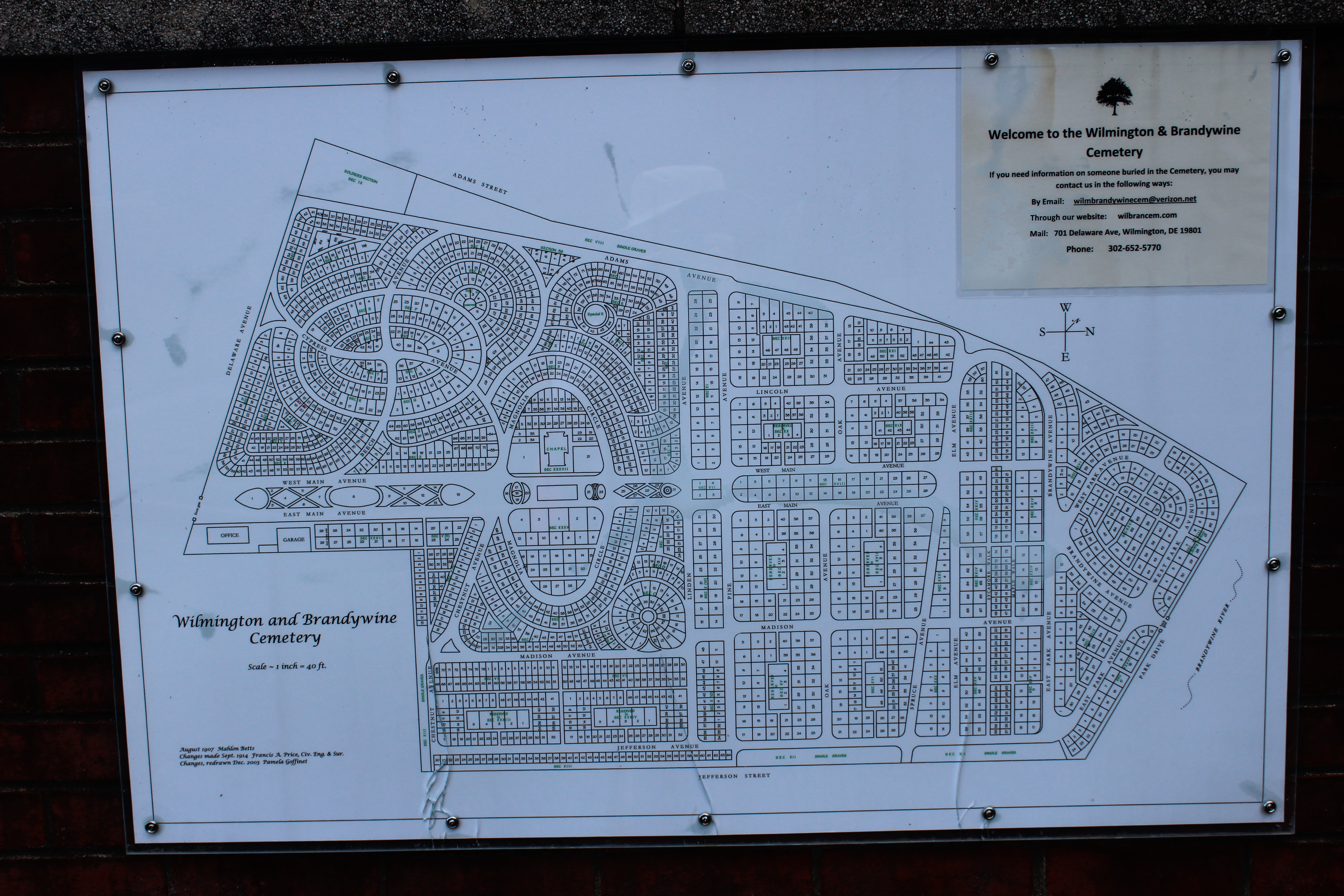
Map of Wilmington and Brandywine Cemetery

- William Hepburn Armstrong (1824–1919), U.S. Congressman
- Richard Bassett (1745–1815), U.S. Senator and Governor of Delaware, signer of the United States Constitution
- James A. Bayard Sr. (1767–1815), U.S. Senator and Congressman
- Richard H. Bayard (1796–1868), U.S. Senator
- Gunning Bedford Jr. (1747–1812), Signer of the U.S. Constitution
- Emily Bissell (1861–1948), Social reformer, introduced Christmas Seals to the United States
- Levi Clark Bootes (1809–1896), Civil War Brevet Brigadier General
- James Canby (1781–1858), early American railroad executive
- John P. Gillis (1803–1873), Commodore in the U.S. Navy
- Willard Hall (1780–1875), U.S. Congressman
- Bill Hawke (1870–1902), Major League Baseball pitcher
- William H. Heald (1864–1939), U.S. Congressman
- Jacob Jones (1768–1850), U.S. Naval Officer
- Flip Lafferty (1854–1910), professional baseball player
- Henry Latimer (1752–1819), U.S. Senator and Congressman
- Preston Lea (1841–1916), 52nd Governor of Delaware
- Eleazer McComb (1740–1798), Continental Congressman
- John McKinly (1721–1796), President of Delaware
- Charles R. Miller (1857–1927), 54th Governor of Delaware
- John J. Milligan (1795–1875), U.S. Congressman
- Alice Dunbar Nelson (1875–1935), poet, journalist and political activist
- Hezekiah Niles (1777–1839), editor and poet of the Weekly Register
- James P. Postles (1840–1908), American Medal of Honor recipient
- George R. Riddle (1817–1867), U.S. Senator and Congressman
- Robert P. Robinson (1869–1939), 57th Governor of Delaware
- John Ross (1790–1866), Cherokee nation chief
- Thomas Alfred Smyth (1832–1865), brigadier general in the Union Army
- James Tilton (1745–1822), Continental Congressman
- John Wales (1783–1863), U.S. Senator
- Henry Winfield Watson (1856–1933), U.S. Congressman
