= John Shilling =

English-born American lieutenant (1832–1884)

First Lieutenant John Shilling
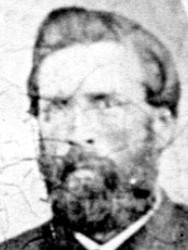
- Born: 15 February 1832; England
- Died: 22 July 1884 (aged 52); Wilmington, Delaware, U.S.
- Burial place: Riverview Cemetery, Wilmington, Delaware, U.S.
- Military career
- Allegiance: United States (Union)
- Branch: Army
- Service years: 1861-1865
- Rank: First Lieutenant
- Units: Company H, 3rd Delaware Infantry
- Conflicts: Weldon Railroad, Virginia (1864)
- Awards: Medal of Honor

John Shilling (15 February 1832 – 22 July 1884) was a first lieutenant of the United States Army who was awarded the Medal of Honor for gallantry during the American Civil War. He was awarded the medal on 6 September 1864 for actions performed on 21 August 1864 during the Second Battle of Globe Tavern in Virginia.

== Personal life ==
Shilling was born in England on 15 February 1832. In 1853, he married Margaret Kirkbride and they had seven children. After her death (date unknown), he married Emma Massey on July 27, 1869, who lived until 1935. They had four children. He died of a brain tumor on 22 July 1884, in Wilmington, Delaware and is buried in Riverview Cemetery in Wilmington.

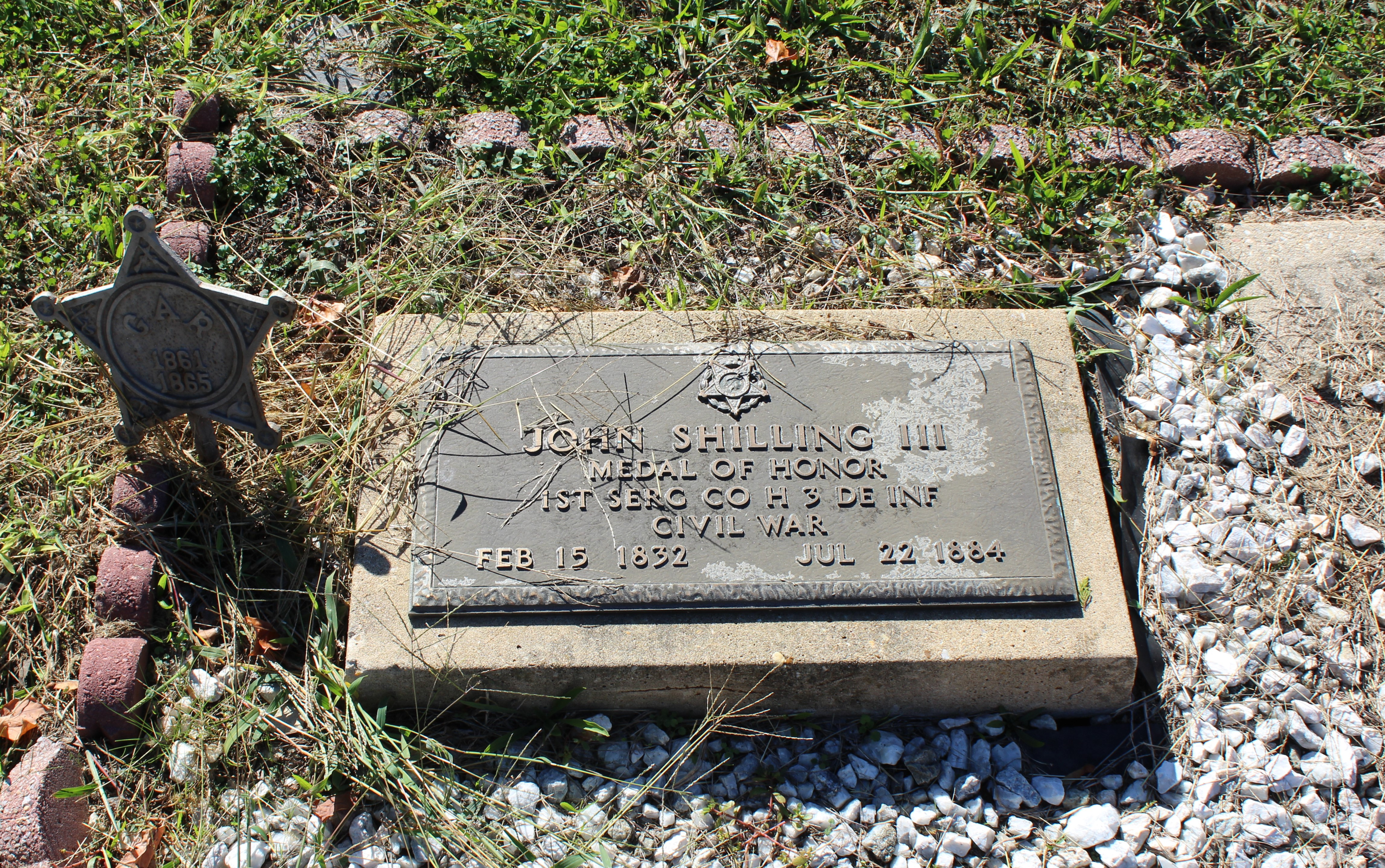
John Shilling gravestone at Riverview Cemetery in Wilmington, Delaware

== Military service ==
Shilling enlisted in Felton, Delaware with H Company of the 3rd Delaware Infantry on 30 December 1861. Shortly after the Battle of Antietam (also known as the Battle of Sharpsburg) on September 17, 1862, Shilling became a first sergeant. On 21 August 1864, in a battle with Confederate General Johnson Hagood's forces, a Carolinian flag captured by Captain Dennis Daily was retaken by Hagood. Taking advantage of the confusion, Shilling ran forward and captured a South Carolinian flag, an action that won him the Medal of Honor. It is unknown when Shilling was promoted to second lieutenant, but he was promoted to first lieutenant on 2 October 1864.

Shilling's Medal of Honor citation reads:

The President of the United States of America, in the name of Congress, takes pleasure in presenting the Medal of Honor to First Sergeant John Shilling, United States Army, for extraordinary heroism on 21 August 1864, while serving with Company H, 3d Delaware Infantry, in action at Weldon Railroad, Virginia, for capture of flag.

— E. M. Stanton, Secretary of War

Shilling was mustered out of the Army on 3 June 1865. His Medal of Honor is attributed to Delaware.
