= James P. Postles =

American soldier

James Parke Postles
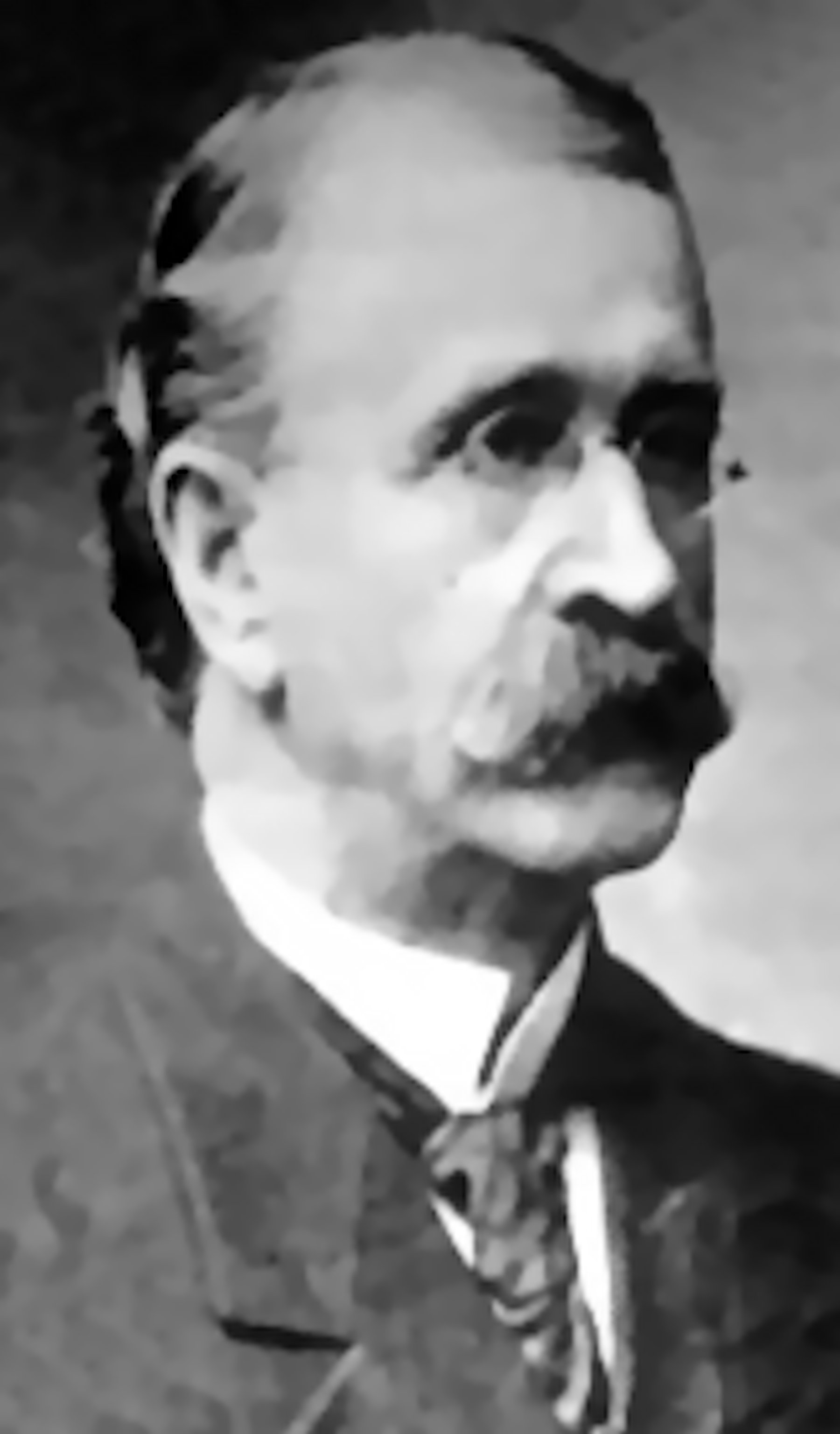
- Born: September 28, 1840; Camden, Delaware, US
- Died: May 27, 1908 (aged 67); Wilmington, Delaware, US
- Burial place: Wilmington and Brandywine Cemetery
- Military career
- Allegiance: United States of America
- Branch: United States Army
- Rank: Captain
- Unit: Company A 1st Delaware Infantry
- Conflicts: Battle of Gettysburg; American Civil War
- Awards: Medal of Honor

James P. Postles (September 28, 1840 – May 27, 1908) was an American soldier who fought with the Union Army in the American Civil War. Postles received his country's highest award for bravery during combat, the Medal of Honor, for actions taken on July 2, 1863 during the Battle of Gettysburg.

== Civil War service ==
Postles joined Company C of the 1st Delaware Regiment in Wilmington, Delaware. After a three-month enlistment, Postles was mustered out as a 1st Sergeant. When the regiment reorganized, Postles was placed in Company A as a 1st Lieutenant.

Postles' first major conflict was at the Battle of Antietam. During an attack in the Sunken Road, Company A lost roughly half its men, including its captain. Following the battle, Postles was lauded by his commanding officer as behaving with "exemplary coolness and bravery", and was named the new Captain for Company A. Postles also received commendations during the Battle of Gettysburg when he volunteered to ride on horseback to deliver a letter in the face of heavy enemy fire, and returned unharmed. For this action, Postles was awarded the Medal of Honor.

== Medal of Honor citation ==
The President of the United States of America, in the name of Congress, takes pleasure in presenting the Medal of Honor to Captain (Infantry) James Parke Postles, United States Army, for extraordinary heroism on 2 July 1863, while serving with Company A, 1st Delaware Infantry, in action at Gettysburg, Pennsylvania. Captain Postles voluntarily delivered an order in the face of heavy fire of the enemy.

== Personal life ==
Following the war, Postles returned to Delaware where we entered into his father's leather business. In 1878, he served as Adjutant General of Delaware. He was a companion of the Pennsylvania Commandery of the Military Order of the Loyal Legion of the United States.

Postles died of a brain concussion after falling down a set of stairs at the Wilmington Masonic Temple. He was interred at the Wilmington and Brandywine Cemetery.
