= William L. Carlisle =

Train robber of the American West (1890-1964)

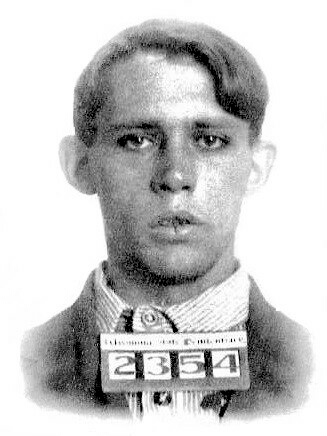
- "Wild Bill" Carlisle, from a wanted poster of 1919
- Born: May 4, 1890; Chester County, Pennsylvania, U.S.
- Died: June 19, 1964 (aged 74); Pennsylvania, U.S.
- Resting place: Riverview Cemetery, Wilmington, Delaware, U.S.
- Known for: Train robberies
- Spouse: Lillian Lavina Berquest
- Criminal charge: Robbery
- Penalty: Life imprisonment (commuted to 25–50 years)
- Escaped: 15 November 1919
- Escape end: 2 December 1919

William L. "Wild Bill" Carlisle (May 4, 1890 – June 19, 1964) was one of the last train robbers of the American West known as the "Robin Hood of the Rails" and "The White-Masked Bandit".

== Early years ==
Bill Carlisle (Note: Some sources claim he was born as Walter Lawrence Cottrell) born in Chester County in Pennsylvania in 1890, the youngest of five children born to David Cottrell, a 60-year-old Civil War veteran and his 37-year-old wife Salome Lentz Cottrell. Some sources claim he was born as Walter Lawrence Cottrell. His mother died when he was nine months old and because of his father's ill-health he and his siblings were taken to an orphanage. In 1893 aged 3 he was claimed by his family but was passed from relative to relative. As a teenager he began to ride the freight trains and by 1905 he was a hobo. In 1907 aged 17 he rode the train to Montana to work as a ranch hand.

== Train robber ==
By early 1916 he was destitute, with only a nickel in his pocket; he decided the quickest way to obtain cash was to hold up a train. Carlisle robbed his first train in Wyoming on 9 February 1916 wearing a white bandana over his face and armed with a toy pistol and a .32-caliber pistol. During the robbery he gave coins to a guard to make up for his lost tips, gave a dollar to a man to pay for his breakfast and bowed to a woman who tried to take his gun from him. He held up two more trains over the next two months. He was caught on 22 April 1916 and was sentenced to life imprisonment in the Wyoming State Penitentiary in Rawlins on 10 May 1916 after a two-day trial, even though he never shot anyone during the robberies and did not take money from women, children or servicemen. In prison he worked in the shirt factory.

== Escape ==
Because of his good behavior in prison, in 1919 his life sentence was commuted to 25–50 years. However, Carlisle decided he could not wait that long to be released, and on 15 November 1919 he escaped from Wyoming State Penitentiary by being carried outside the walls in a packing crate with a shipment of shirts. He again robbed a train on November 18 but found most of the passengers were soldiers and sailors returning from service in France during World War I; Carlisle did not take money from these. When a young man pointed a revolver at him Carlisle knocked it away, but it went off and injured his left hand. He was arrested again on 2 December 1919 in a cabin near Glendo, Wyoming having been hunted by a posse who shot him through the lung while capturing him, necessitating his being carried down from the cabin strapped to the back of a pack horse. Following surgery to remove the bullets in his lung and hand and a 33-day stay in hospital he returned to Wyoming State Penitentiary on 18 December 1919.

== Later life ==
Bill Carlisle in his later years

Carlisle was paroled on 8 January 1936 for good behavior and on 23 December 1936 he married Lillian Lavina Berquest (died 1962), the superintendent of the local nursing home who took care of him after an operation for a ruptured appendix. The couple raised an adopted daughter and opened a cigar shop and newsstand in Kemmerer, Wyoming before moving to Laramie, Wyoming where they opened a gas station and later a motel, which flourished partly because of his train-robbing reputation. During the 1940s he toured the United States to promote Westerns. The rights to his story were bought in 1950 but the film was never made. He wrote his autobiography in 1946, and received a full pardon from the Governor of Wyoming in 1947. Carlisle sold his motel in Laramie in 1956.

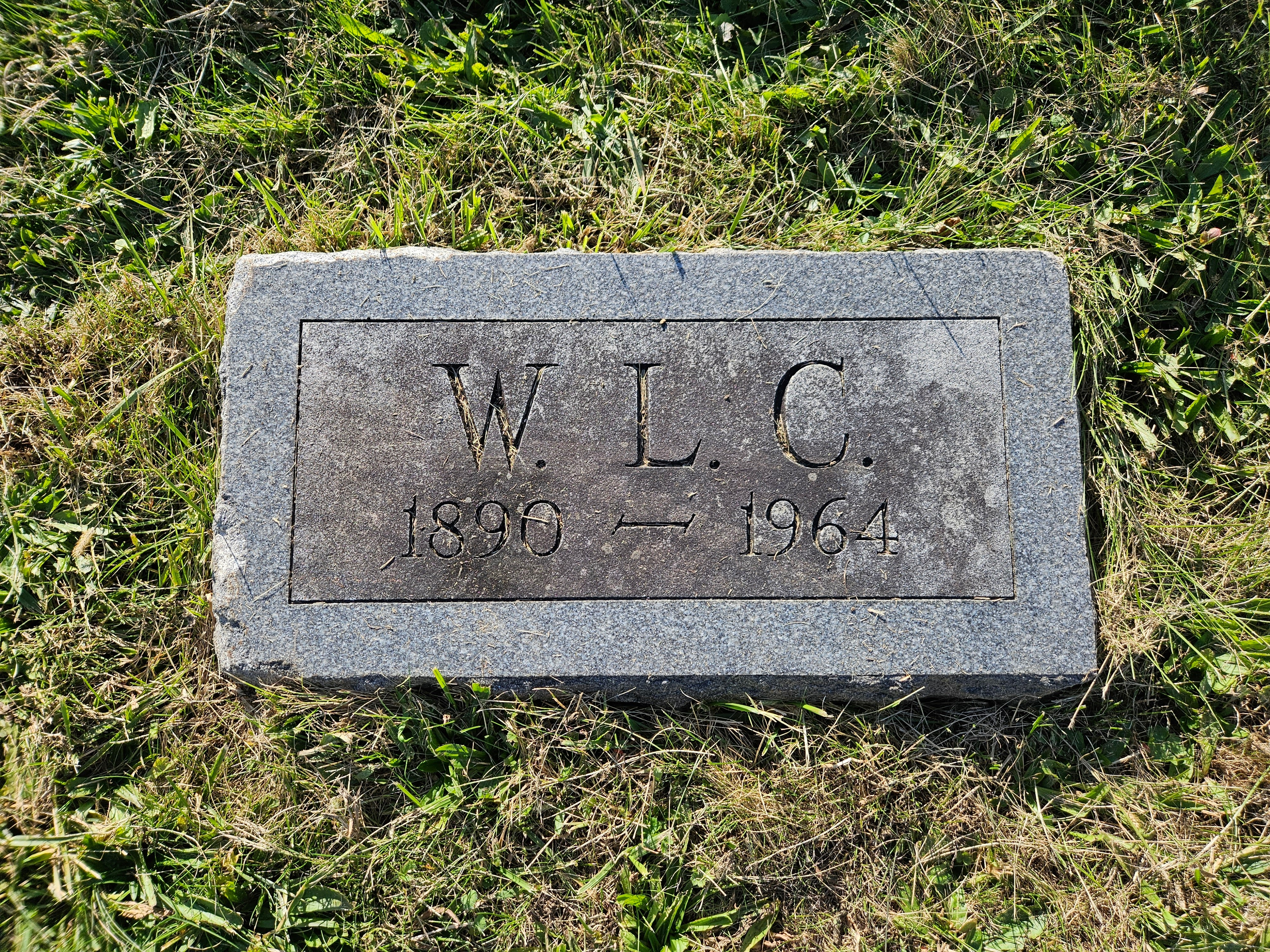
William L. Carlisle grave in Riverview Cemetery, Wilmington, Delaware

After his wife's death in 1962 he returned to Pennsylvania and died there from cancer in 1964 aged 74 in the home of his niece, Mrs. Hilda Cammie and her husband Francis. He was interred at Riverview Cemetery in Wilmington, Delaware.
