= List of presidential trips made by Joe Biden (2021) =

This is a list of presidential trips made by Joe Biden during 2021, the first year of his presidency as the 46th president of the United States. Due to the COVID-19 pandemic, travel and many in-person meetings were curtailed and replaced with telephone calls and virtual meetings.

This list excludes trips made within Washington, D.C., the U.S. federal capital in which the White House, the official residence and principal workplace of the president, is located. Also excluded are trips to Camp David, the country residence of the president, as well as Joint Base Andrews. International trips are included. The number of visits per state or territory where he traveled are:

- One: California, Colorado, Florida, Idaho, Kentucky, Massachusetts, Minnesota, Missouri, New Hampshire, Oklahoma, South Carolina and Texas
- Two: Connecticut, Georgia, Illinois, Louisiana, New Jersey, North Carolina and Wisconsin
- Three: New York and Ohio
- Five: Michigan
- Nine: Maryland and Pennsylvania
- Twelve: Virginia
- Thirty-one: Delaware
- International: 2 trips to 5 countries

Locations in the contiguous United States that President Joe Biden has visited in 2021.

January (blue) – February (yellow) – March (brown) – April (pink) – May (grey) – June (orange) – July (purple) – August (light blue) – September (magenta) – October (green) – November (red) –

December (light green)

Map of trips made by Joe Biden within the United States in 2021, as of September 11th, 2021 (missing several states) Washington, D.C. 7 or more visits 6 visits 5 visits 4 visits 3 visits 2 visits 1 visit No visits

== January ==
Country/ U.S. state	Areas visited	Dates	Details	Image
Virginia	Arlington	January 20	President Biden participated in a wreath-laying ceremony at the Tomb of the Unknown Soldier in Arlington National Cemetery following his inauguration. He was joined by Vice President Harris and former Presidents Bill Clinton, George W. Bush, and Barack Obama.	
Maryland	Bethesda	January 29	President Biden traveled to Walter Reed National Military Medical Center to visit wounded troops. This was President Biden's first trip aboard Marine One.	

== February ==
Country/ U.S. state	Areas visited	Dates	Details	Image
Delaware	Wilmington, Greenville	February 5–8	Arriving via Wilmington-New Castle Airport, President Biden visited his Delaware home for the weekend. First trip on Air Force One, flying the Boeing C-32 aircraft usually used as Air Force Two. On Sunday, he attended Mass at his home parish, St. Joseph on the Brandywine in Greenville.	
Virginia	Arlington	February 10	President Biden visited the headquarters of the Department of Defense at The Pentagon with Vice President Harris and Secretary of Defense Austin.	
Maryland	Bethesda	February 11	President Biden visited the headquarters of the National Institutes of Health.	P20210211AS-1401 - 50970923622
Wisconsin	Milwaukee	February 16	Arriving via Milwaukee Mitchell International Airport, President Biden participated in a town hall event organized by CNN at the Pabst Theater with Anderson Cooper. First official presidential trip, and first trip aboard the Boeing VC-25 normally used as Air Force One.	
Michigan	Portage	February 19	Arriving via Kalamazoo/Battle Creek International Airport, President Biden visited the COVID-19 vaccine maker Pfizer in Portage with Michigan Governor Gretchen Whitmer.	
Texas	Houston	February 26	Arriving via Ellington Field Joint Reserve Base, President Biden and First Lady Jill Biden visited Texas and surveyed damage sustained during the February 13–17, 2021 North American winter storm. They were greeted by Texas Governor Greg Abbott and US Representative Sheila Jackson Lee upon arrival. Locations visited include Harris County Emergency Operations Center, Houston Food Bank, and the NRG Stadium COVID-19 vaccination facility.	P20210226AS-0930 (51013222636)
Delaware	Wilmington, Greenville	February 27–28	Arriving via Wilmington-New Castle Airport, President Biden and First Lady Jill Biden visited their Delaware home for the weekend. On Sunday, President Biden attended Mass at his home parish, St. Joseph on the Brandywine in Greenville.	

== March ==
Country/ U.S. state	Areas visited	Dates	Details	Image
Delaware	Wilmington, Greenville	March 1	President Biden and First Lady Jill Biden continued their weekend stay at their Delaware home, before returning to Washington, D.C., on Monday.	
Delaware	Wilmington, Greenville	March 12–14	Arriving via Wilmington-New Castle Airport on Marine One, President Biden and First Lady Jill Biden visited their Delaware home for the weekend. On Saturday, President Biden attended Mass with his grandchildren Natalie and Hunter of the late Beau Biden at his home parish, St. Joseph on the Brandywine in Greenville.	
Pennsylvania	Chester	March 16	Arriving via Philadelphia International Airport, President Biden made his first visit to his native state since becoming president. It is the first stop of his "Help is Here Tour," promoting the recently signed American Rescue Plan. He visited a small business which received benefits from the recently passed legislation.	
Delaware	Wilmington, Greenville	March 16–17	Arriving via Wilmington-New Castle Airport on Marine One, President Biden spent the night at his Delaware home following his visit to Pennsylvania. On Wednesday, he attended Mass in honor of St. Patrick’s Day at St. Joseph on the Brandywine in Greenville.	
Georgia	Atlanta	March 19	Arriving via Dobbins Air Reserve Base and flying to DeKalb–Peachtree Airport on Marine One, President Biden traveled to Atlanta with Vice President Harris to get an update from health and medical experts in the fight against COVID-19 at CDC headquarters. They also met with Georgia Asian American leaders at Emory University in the aftermath of the 2021 Atlanta spa shootings. President Biden then traveled to Camp David for the weekend.	
Ohio	Columbus	March 23	Arriving via John Glenn Columbus International Airport, President Biden traveled to Columbus as part of his "Help is Here Tour". He toured and delivered remarks at The James Cancer Hospital.	
Delaware	Wilmington, Greenville	March 26–28	Arriving via Wilmington-New Castle Airport, President Biden and his son Hunter Biden visited their Delaware home for the weekend. On Saturday, President Biden attended Mass at St. Joseph on the Brandywine in Greenville.	
Pennsylvania	Pittsburgh	March 31	Arriving via Pittsburgh International Airport, President Biden visited Pittsburgh as part of his "Help is Here Tour." He delivered remarks at the Carpenters Pittsburgh Training Center.	

== April ==
Country/ U.S. state	Areas visited	Dates	Details	Image
Virginia	Alexandria	April 6	President Biden visited a COVID-19 vaccination site at Virginia Theological Seminary.	
Virginia	Arlington	April 14	President Biden visited Section 60 of the Arlington National Cemetery to pay his respects to U.S. troops killed since the "war on terror".	
Delaware	Wilmington, Greenville	April 16–18	Arriving via Wilmington-New Castle Airport on Marine One, President Biden visited his Delaware home for the weekend. On Saturday, he played a round of golf at Wilmington Country Club with Steve Ricchetti. On Sunday, he and First Lady Jill Biden attended the confirmation of his grandson Hunter, the son of the late Beau Biden, at St. Joseph on the Brandywine.	
Delaware	Wilmington, Greenville	April 24–25	Arriving via Wilmington-New Castle Airport on Marine One, President Biden and First Lady Jill Biden visited their Delaware home for the weekend. Upon arrival, President Biden attended Mass at St. Joseph on the Brandywine in Greenville.	
Georgia	Plains, Duluth	April 29	Arriving via Lawson Army Airfield and flying to Jimmy Carter Regional Airport on Marine One, President Biden and First Lady Jill Biden visited former President Jimmy Carter and former First Lady Rosalynn Carter at their home in Plains. They then flew to Duluth, GA on Marine One via Gwinnett County Airport for a drive-in rally at Infinite Energy Arena to mark the first 100 days of his administration and as part of his "Getting America Back on Track Tour" to promote the American Jobs Plan and the American Families Plan. They returned to Washington, D.C., via Dobbins Air Reserve Base.	
Pennsylvania	Philadelphia	April 30	Arriving via Philadelphia International Airport, President Biden traveled Philadelphia as part of his "Getting America Back on Track Tour" to promote the American Jobs Plan and the American Families Plan. He delivered remarks an event marking the 50th anniversary of Amtrak at William H. Gray III 30th Street Station. He then traveled from Philadelphia to Wilmington.	
Delaware	Wilmington	April 30	Arriving via Wilmington-New Castle Airport on Marine One, President Biden and First Lady Jill Biden visited their Delaware home for the weekend.	

== May ==
Country/ U.S. state	Areas visited	Dates	Details	Image
Delaware	Wilmington, Greenville	May 1–2	President Biden and First Lady Jill Biden continued their weekend stay at their Delaware home before returning to Washington, D.C., on Sunday. On Saturday, President Biden attended Mass at his home parish, St. Joseph on the Brandywine in Greenville and played a round of golf at the Fieldstone Golf Club.	
Virginia	Yorktown, Portsmouth	May 3	Arriving via Newport News/Williamsburg International Airport, President Biden and First Lady Jill Biden visited Yorktown Elementary School. They also delivered remarks at the Portsmouth Campus of Tidewater Community College as part of his "Getting America Back on Track Tour".	
Louisiana	Lake Charles, New Orleans	May 6	Arriving via Chennault International Airport, President Biden delivered remarks to promote the American Jobs Plan as part of his "Getting America Back on Track Tour". Then flying to Louis Armstrong New Orleans International Airport, President Biden toured Carrollton Water Plant in New Orleans.	
Delaware	Wilmington, Greenville	May 15–17	Arriving via Wilmington-New Castle Airport on Marine One, President Biden and First Lady Jill Biden visited their Delaware home for the weekend. On Sunday, President Biden attended Mass at his home parish, St. Joseph on the Brandywine in Greenville and played a round of golf at the Wilmington Country Club.	
Michigan	Dearborn	May 18	Arriving via Detroit Metropolitan Wayne County Airport, President Biden visited and delivered remarks at the Ford Rouge Electric Vehicle Center in Dearborn ahead of the company's unveiling of the all-electric Ford F-150 Lightning.	
Connecticut	New London	May 19	Arriving via Quonset State Airport and flying to the United States Coast Guard Academy on Marine One, President Biden delivered the commencement address at the United States Coast Guard Academy graduation.	
Delaware	Wilmington	May 25	Arriving via Wilmington-New Castle Airport on Marine One, President Biden and his son Hunter Biden made a brief visit to Delaware to attend the funeral service of President Biden's former Senate staff.	
Ohio	Cleveland	May 27	Arriving via Cleveland Hopkins International Airport, President Biden visited and delivered remarks on the economy at Cuyahoga Community College.	
Virginia	Alexandria, Hampton	May 28	President Biden visited a business in Alexandria and he and Virginia Governor Ralph Northam delivered remarks to celebrate the significant progress Virginia has made in the fight against COVID-19. President Biden and First Lady Jill Biden flew to Joint Base Langley–Eustis and delivered remarks. They flew from Hampton to Wilmington.	
Delaware	Wilmington, Greenville, New Castle	May 28–31	Arriving via Wilmington-New Castle Airport, President Biden and First Lady Jill Biden visited their Delaware home for Memorial Day weekend. On Sunday, President Biden delivered remarks on Memorial Day at Veterans Memorial Park at the Delaware Memorial Bridge. Then, he and First Lady Jill Biden later visited the burial site of their late son Beau Biden at their home parish, St. Joseph on the Brandywine in Greenville, on the sixth anniversary of his death.	
Virginia	Arlington	May 31	President Biden and First Lady Jill Biden participated in a wreath-laying ceremony at the Tomb of the Unknown Soldier in Arlington National Cemetery on Memorial Day. He was joined by Vice President Harris, Secretary of Defense Austin and Chairman General Milley. President Biden delivered the Memorial Day address at the Memorial Amphitheater.	

== June ==
Country/ U.S. state	Areas visited	Dates	Details	Image
Oklahoma	Tulsa	June 1	Arriving via Tulsa International Airport, President Biden delivered remarks to commemorate the 100th anniversary of the Tulsa race massacre at Greenwood Cultural Center. He was joined by HUD Secretary Marcia Fudge, Domestic Policy Advisor Susan Rice, and Director of the Office of Public Engagement Cedric Richmond.	
Delaware	Rehoboth Beach	June 2–4	Arriving via Cape Henlopen State Park on Marine One, President Biden and First Lady Jill Biden visited their Delaware beach home and celebrated her 70th birthday on June 3. On Thursday, they went on a bike ride at Cape Henlopen State Park. They flew on Marine One to Dover Air Force Base and returned to Washington, D.C., on Air Force One on Friday.	
United Kingdom	Mildenhall, St Ives, Bodelva, Windsor	June 9–13	President Biden and First Lady Jill Biden traveled to the United Kingdom to attend the 47th G7 summit at the Carbis Bay Hotel near St Ives. They stopped at RAF Mildenhall to meet with United States Air Force personnel and their families stationed there. They flew to St Ives via Newquay Airport where he stayed at Tregenna Castle. On June 10, President Biden held a bilateral meeting with Prime Minister Boris Johnson. Both Biden and Johnson would issue a revision of the Atlantic Charter which had previously been issued by U.S. President Franklin Roosevelt and British Prime Minister Winston Churchill eighty years prior. On June 11, he participated in a meeting with G7 leaders and members of the Royal Family at the Eden Project at Bodelva. On June 13, he traveled to Windsor Castle arriving at Heathrow Airport and flying on Marine One to meet with Queen Elizabeth II at Windsor Castle, before flying to Brussels for the night.	
Belgium	Brussels	June 13–15	Arriving via Brussels Airport, President Biden stayed at the U.S. Embassy in Brussels. On June 14, President Biden held multilateral meetings with the leaders of the Baltic States, Secretary General of NATO Jens Stoltenberg, and Turkish President Recep Erdoğan, and participated in the 2021 Brussels summit. On June 15, he met with King Philippe of Belgium and Belgian Prime Minister Alexander De Croo at the Royal Palace of Brussels. He also participated in a EU–U.S. summit with European Council president Charles Michel and European Commission president Ursula von der Leyen at the Europa Building, before departing for Geneva in the afternoon.	
Switzerland	Geneva	June 15–16	Arriving via Geneva Airport, President Biden held a bilateral meeting with Swiss President Guy Parmelin and Swiss Foreign Minister Ignazio Cassis at the InterContinental Geneva where he stayed for the night. On June 16, President Biden attended the summit meeting with Russian President Vladimir Putin at Villa La Grange, before returning to Washington, D.C., that evening.	
Delaware	Wilmington, Greenville	June 18–20	Arriving via Wilmington-New Castle Airport on Marine One, President Biden visited his Delaware home for the weekend. On Saturday, he attended Mass at St. Joseph on the Brandywine in Greenville. He also confirmed the older of his two dogs Champ had died peacefully at home. On Sunday, he played a round of golf with his grandson Hunter, the son of the late Beau Biden at the Fieldstone Golf Club.	
North Carolina	Raleigh	June 24	Arriving via Raleigh–Durham International Airport, President Biden visited a mobile vaccination unit and meets with frontline workers and volunteers. President Biden delivered remarks on highlighting the importance of getting vaccinated and kicking off a community canvassing event at Green Road Community Center.	
Wisconsin	La Crosse	June 29	Arriving via La Crosse Regional Airport, President Biden toured and delivered remarks on highlighting the benefits the bipartisan infrastructure framework that would deliver to communities across the country at La Crosse Municipal Transit Utility.	

== July ==
Country/ U.S. state	Areas visited	Dates	Details	Image
Florida	Surfside	July 1	Arriving via Miami International Airport, President Biden and First Lady Jill Biden visited the site of the Surfside condominium building collapse.	
Michigan	Traverse City, Central Lake	July 3	Arriving via Cherry Capital Airport and flying to Antrim County Airport on Marine One. President Biden toured a local cherry farm with Michigan Governor Gretchen Whitmer as part of "America's Back Together" tour to celebrate the country's progress against COVID-19. He also stopped at a local ice cream shop before departing for Wilmington.	
Delaware	Wilmington	July 3–4	Arriving via Wilmington-New Castle Airport, President Biden visited his Delaware home for Independence Day weekend. He played golf at Wilmington Country Club before returning to Washington, D.C., on Sunday.	
Illinois	Crystal Lake	July 7	Arriving via O'Hare International Airport and flying to McHenry County College on Marine One, President Biden delivered remarks on the Build Back Better Plan agenda.	
Delaware	Wilmington, Greenville	July 9–11	Arriving via Wilmington-New Castle Airport, President Biden visited his Delaware home for weekend. On Saturday, he attended Mass at St. Joseph on the Brandywine in Greenville. On Saturday and Sunday, he played golf at Fieldstone Golf Club.	
Pennsylvania	Philadelphia	July 13	Arriving via Philadelphia International Airport, President Biden delivered remarks on protecting the sacred, constitutional right to vote at National Constitution Center.	
Ohio	Cincinnati, Delhi	July 21	Arriving via Cincinnati/Northern Kentucky International Airport, President Biden visited IBEW / NECA Electrical Training Center to discuss his Build Back Better Plan agenda. He then participated in a town hall event organized by CNN at Mount St. Joseph University with Don Lemon in Delhi.	
Virginia	Arlington	July 23	President Biden held a campaign event for former Virginia Governor and Virginia Gubernatorial candidate Terry McAuliffe at Lubber Run Park for the upcoming 2021 Virginia gubernatorial election.	
Delaware	Wilmington, Greenville	July 23–25	Arriving via Wilmington-New Castle Airport on Marine One, President Biden visited his Delaware home for weekend. On Saturday, he played golf at Fieldstone Golf Club and he attended Mass at St. Joseph on the Brandywine in Greenville.	
Pennsylvania	Kennett Square	July 24	President Biden visited the residence of his younger sister Valerie Biden Owens in Kennett Square for dinner. He then returned to Wilmington.	
Virginia	McLean	July 27	President Biden visited and addressed the Intelligence Community workforce and its leadership at office of the Director of National Intelligence.	
Pennsylvania	Macungie	July 28	Arriving via Lehigh Valley International Airport, President Biden visited and delivered remarks on American Manufacturing at Mack Truck - Lehigh Valley Operations Manufacturing Facility to promote buying American-made products.	
Maryland	Bethesda	July 29	President Biden traveled to Walter Reed National Military Medical Center on Marine One to visit and pick up First Lady Jill Biden following a procedure on her injured foot.	

== August ==
Country/ U.S. state	Areas visited	Dates	Details	Image
Maryland	Lanham	August 4	President Biden visited the Plumbers & Gasfitters Local 5 Training Facility.	
Delaware	Wilmington, Greenville	August 6–10	Arriving via Wilmington-New Castle Airport on Marine One, President Biden visited his Delaware home for a long weekend until Tuesday. On Saturday, he played golf at Fieldstone Golf Club and attended Mass at St. Joseph on the Brandywine in Greenville.	
Delaware	Wilmington	August 12–13	Flying from Fort Lesley J. McNair to Wilmington-New Castle Airport on Marine One, President Biden and First Lady Jill Biden visited their Delaware home for the night. On Friday, they traveled to Camp David for a weekend vacation.	
Delaware	Dover	August 29	President Biden and First Lady Jill Biden flew to Dover Air Force Base with Secretary of Defense Austin to receive the remains and meet with the families of fallen American service members who died in the Kabul Airport Suicide Bombing.	

== September ==
Country/ U.S. state	Areas visited	Dates	Details	Image
Maryland	Bethesda	September 2	President Biden and First Lady Jill Biden traveled to Walter Reed National Military Medical Center to visit wounded service members from the Kabul Airport Suicide Bombing.	
Louisiana	LaPlace, Galliano	September 3	Arriving via Louis Armstrong New Orleans International Airport and flying to Port of South Louisiana Executive Regional Airport on Marine One, President Biden toured a neighborhood and delivered remarks on the response to Hurricane Ida in LaPlace and inspected and surveyed the damage from the storm. He then flew to South Lafourche Airport and then met with local leaders from impacted communities at the Lafourche Parish in Galliano.	Biden in LaPlace, Louisiana
Delaware	Wilmington, Greenville, New Castle	September 3–6	Arriving via Philadelphia International Airport and flying to Wilmington-New Castle Airport on Marine One, President Biden visited his Delaware home Labor Day weekend. On Saturday, he attended Mass at St. Joseph on the Brandywine in Greenville and he played a round of golf at the Fieldstone Golf Club. On Monday, he stopped by at International Brotherhood of Electrical Workers.	
New Jersey	Hillsborough Township, Manville	September 7	Arriving via John F. Kennedy International Airport and flying to Central Jersey Regional Airport on Marine One, President Biden received a briefing from local leaders on the impacts of Hurricane Ida at Somerset County Emergency Management Training Center. He toured a neighborhood on the response to Hurricane Ida in Manville.	
New York	Queens	September 7	Arriving via LaGuardia Airport on Marine One, President Biden toured the Queens neighborhood of East Elmhurst and delivered remarks on the response to Hurricane Ida in Queens.	
New York	New York City	September 10–11	Arriving via LaGuardia Airport, President Biden and First Lady Jill Biden spent the night at InterContinental New York Barclay Hotel. On September 11, they participated in a memorial ceremony at the World Trade Center Memorial. They were joined by former Presidents Bill Clinton and Barack Obama and former First Ladies Hillary Clinton and Michelle Obama.	
Pennsylvania	Shanksville	September 11	Arriving via Pennsylvania Air National Guard, and flying to the Flight 93 National Memorial on Marine One, President Biden and First Lady Jill Biden participated in a wreath-laying ceremony in honoring the victims of United Airlines Flight 93 which crashed into a field in Somerset County on September 11, 2001. They were joined by Vice President Harris, Second Gentleman Doug Emhoff, former President George W. Bush and former First Lady Laura Bush. They also stopped at Shanksville Volunteer Fire Department.	
Virginia	Arlington	September 11	Arriving at The Pentagon on Marine One, President Biden and First Lady Jill Biden participated in a wreath-laying ceremony at the Pentagon Memorial. They were joined by Vice President Harris, Second Gentleman Doug Emhoff and Secretary of Defense Austin.	
Delaware	Wilmington, Greenville	September 11–13	Flying from The Pentagon to Brandywine Creek State Park on Marine One, President Biden and First Lady Jill Biden visited their Delaware home for the weekend. On Sunday, President Biden attended Mass at St. Joseph on the Brandywine in Greenville and he played a round of golf at the Fieldstone Golf Club with former Delaware Senator Ted Kaufman.	
Idaho	Boise	September 13	Arriving via Boise Airport, President Biden visited and received a briefing from Federal and state fire agency officials at National Interagency Fire Center.	
California	Mather, Long Beach	September 13–14	Arriving via Sacramento Mather Airport, President Biden received a briefing from local, state, and Federal emergency response personnel on the impacts of Caldor Fire and surveyed damage from the fire. He delivered remarks on his Administrations response to recent wildfires, and how the investments he is proposing in his bipartisan infrastructure deal and Build Back Better Plan agenda. He then flew to Long Beach Airport with California Governor Gavin Newsom and held a campaign event for him at Long Beach City College for the upcoming recall election. He spent the night at The Westin Long Beach Hotel.	
Colorado	Arvada	September 14	Arriving via Denver International Airport, President Biden visited and delivered remarks on Bipartisan Infrastructure Deal and Build Back Better Plan agenda at National Renewable Energy Laboratory.	
Delaware	Rehoboth Beach	September 17–20	Arriving via Dover Air Force Base and flying to Cape Henlopen State Park on Marine One, President Biden and First Lady Jill Biden visited their Delaware beach home for the weekend. On Saturday, they attended mass at St. Edmond Catholic Church. On Sunday they went on a bike ride at Cape Henlopen State Park. They flew back to Washington, D.C., on Marine One on Monday.	
New York	New York City	September 20–21	Arriving via John F. Kennedy International Airport, President Biden was greeted by New York Governor Kathy Hochul upon arrival. He then flew to Manhattan Harbor on Marine One and held bilateral meeting with United Nations Secretary-General António Guterres and he spent the night at InterContinental New York Barclay Hotel. On September 21, President Biden addressed at the United Nations General Assembly at the Headquarters of the United Nations. He held bilateral meetings with Australia Prime Minister Scott Morrison and Iraq president Barham Salih.	

== October ==
Country/ U.S. state	Areas visited	Dates	Details	Image
Delaware	Wilmington, Greenville	October 2–4	Arriving via Wilmington-New Castle Airport on Marine One, President Biden and First Lady Jill Biden visited their Delaware home for weekend. Upon arrival, President Biden played a round of golf at the Fieldstone Golf Club with Steve Ricchetti. On Sunday, he attended Mass at St. Joseph on the Brandywine in Greenville, then he stopped for brunch at Brew HaHa at the Powder Mill Square.	
Michigan	Howell	October 5	Arriving via Capital Region International Airport, President Biden visited and delivered remarks on his bipartisan infrastructure bill and Build Back Better Plan agenda at International Union of Operating Engineers Local 324 training facility.	
Illinois	Elk Grove Village	October 7	Arriving via O'Hare International Airport, President Biden was greeted by Chicago Mayor Lori Lightfoot and Illinois Governor J. B. Pritzker upon arrival. He then delivered remarks on the importance of COVID-19 vaccine requirements at Clayco construction side.	
Delaware	Wilmington, Greenville	October 8–11	Arriving via Brandywine Creek State Park on Marine One, President Biden visited his Delaware home for Columbus Day weekend. On Sunday, he attended Mass with his granddaughters Natalie of the late Beau Biden and Finnegan Biden of Hunter Biden at St. Joseph on the Brandywine in Greenville.	
Pennsylvania	Kennett Square	October 11	President Biden attended his nephew's wedding at the residence of his younger sister Valerie Biden Owens in Kennett Square. He then returned to Wilmington.	
Connecticut	Hartford, Storrs	October 15	Arriving via Bradley International Airport and flying to the University of Connecticut on Marine One, President Biden delivered remarks promoting his Build Back Better Plan agenda and importance of child care at Capitol Child Development Center. He also delivered remarks at the dedication of the Dodd Center for Human Rights at the University of Connecticut.	
Pennsylvania	Scranton	October 20	Arriving via Wilkes-Barre/Scranton International Airport, President Biden delivered remarks promoting his bipartisan infrastructure deal and Build Back Better Plan agenda at Electric City Trolley Museum.	
Maryland	Baltimore	October 21	Arriving via Fort McHenry on Marine One, President Biden participated in a town hall event organized by CNN at the Baltimore Center Stage with Anderson Cooper.	
Delaware	Wilmington, Middletown, Greenville	October 22–25	Arriving via Wilmington-New Castle Airport on Marine One, President Biden and First Lady Jill Biden visited their Delaware home for the weekend. On Saturday, they attended their granddaughter Natalie Biden’s field hockey game at St. Andrew's School and also they attended Mass at St. Joseph on the Brandywine in Greenville. On Sunday, President Biden hosted Senators Chuck Schumer and Joe Manchin at his home to discuss his domestic agenda. On Monday, he traveled to New Jersey via Air Force One.	
New Jersey	Plainfield, Kearny	October 25	Arriving via Newark Liberty International Airport and flying to Cedar Brook Park on Marine One, President Biden visited and highlight his Build Back Better Plan agenda at East End Elementary School. He delivered remarks on promoting his Bipartisan Infrastructure Deal and Build Back Better Plan agenda at NJ TRANSIT Meadowlands Maintenance Complex.	
Virginia	Arlington	October 26	President Biden held a campaign event for former Virginia Governor and Virginia Gubernatorial candidate Terry McAuliffe at Virginia Highlands Park for the upcoming 2021 Virginia gubernatorial election.	
Vatican City	Vatican City	October 29	Arriving via Rome–Fiumicino International Airport, President Biden and First Lady Jill Biden spent the night at the Ambassador's residence at Villa Taverna. On Friday, they visited and had an audience with Pope Francis at the Apostolic Palace. President Biden also held a bilateral meeting with Cardinal Secretary of State Pietro Parolin.	
Italy	Rome	October 28–November 1	President Biden held bilateral meetings with Italian President Sergio Mattarella at Quirinale Palace, Italian Prime Minister Mario Draghi at Chigi Palace, and French President Emmanuel Macron at the Embassy of France. On October 30, President Biden participated in the G20 Summit at La Nuvola in Rome. He met with Italian Prime Minister Mario Draghi, took the customary photo with other world leaders, and attended an event on supporting women-owned businesses. He met with British Prime Minister Boris Johnson, French President Emmanuel Macron, and outgoing German Chancellor Angela Merkel to discuss the path to resuming negotiations for a return to the Iran nuclear deal and their shared concerns about the state of Iran's nuclear program. The President and First Lady attended mass at San Patrizio. They attended gala dinner with other Heads of State at Quirinal Palace. On October 31, President Biden held a bilateral meeting with Turkish President Recep Tayyip Erdoğan, and hosted event on global supply chain resilience through the pandemic and recovery on the margins of G20.	

== November ==
Country/ U.S. state	Areas visited	Dates	Details	Image
United Kingdom	Glasgow	November 1–2	Arriving via Edinburgh Airport, President Biden participated in COP26 at the Scottish Event Campus. He met with British Prime Minister Boris Johnson and UN Secretary-General António Guterres. He delivered the COP26 Leader Statement. He held a bilateral meeting with Indonesian President Joko Widodo. He then attended reception with Prime Minister Johnson at Kelvingrove Art Gallery and Museum. He spent the night at Dalmahoy Hotel & Country Club. On November 2, President Biden delivered remarks on U.S. plan to preserve global forests at the Action on Forests and Land-Use. He participated a meeting on Build Back Better World. He also delivered remarks on highlighting the progress of the Global Methane Pledge. And also delivered remark on Accelerating Clean Technology Innovation and Deployment before returning to Washington later that evening.	
Delaware	Rehoboth Beach	November 6–8	Arriving via Cape Henlopen State Park on Marine One, President Biden and First Lady Jill Biden visited their Delaware beach home for the weekend. Upon arrival, President Biden attended mass at St. Edmond Catholic Church.	
Delaware	Milford	November 10	Arriving via Greater Milford Boys & Girls Club on Marine One, President Biden attended funeral of former Delaware Governor Ruth Ann Minner at Church of Nazarene.	
Maryland	Baltimore	November 10	Arriving via Port of Baltimore on Marine One, President Biden delivered remarks on the Bipartisan Infrastructure Deal.	
Virginia	Arlington	November 11	President Biden and First Lady Jill Biden participated Presidential Armed Forces Full Honor wreath-laying ceremony on the centennial anniversary of the Tomb of the Unknown Soldier in Arlington National Cemetery on Veterans Day and he delivered the Veterans Day address at the Memorial Amphitheater.	
New Hampshire	North Woodstock	November 16	Arriving via Manchester–Boston Regional Airport and flying to Bradley Field on Marine One, President Biden delivered remarks on the Infrastructure Investment and Jobs Act at the Pemigewasset River bridge of New Hampshire Route 49.	
Michigan	Detroit	November 17	Arriving via Detroit Metropolitan Airport, President Biden visited the General Motors Detroit/Hamtramck Assembly Factory ZERO and delivered remarks on the Infrastructure Investment and Jobs Act.	
Maryland	Bethesda	November 19	President Biden visited Walter Reed National Military Medical Center for his annual physical examination.	
Delaware	Wilmington, Greenville	November 19–21	Arriving via Brandywine Creek State Park on Marine One, President Biden visited his Delaware home for weekend and celebrated his 79th birthday. On Saturday, he attended Mass with his daughter Ashley Biden at St. Joseph on the Brandywine in Greenville.	
North Carolina	Fort Bragg	November 22	Arriving via Pope Field, President Biden and First Lady Jill Biden celebrated Thanksgiving with service members and military families as part of the Joining Forces initiative.	
Massachusetts	Nantucket	November 23–28	Arriving via Nantucket Memorial Airport, President Biden, First Lady Jill Biden, their son Hunter Biden, their daughter Ashley Biden and their grandchildren traveled to Nantucket for the Thanksgiving Holiday and they stayed at David Rubenstein's home. On November 25, they visited US Coast Guard Station Brant Point. On November 26, they attended Christmas tree lighting ceremony. On November 27, they attended Mass at St. Mary, Our Lady of the Isle Catholic Church.	
Minnesota	Rosemount	November 30	Arriving via Minneapolis–Saint Paul Joint Air Reserve Station, President Biden delivered remarks on the Infrastructure Investment and Jobs Act at Dakota County Technical College.	

== December ==
Country/ U.S. state	Areas visited	Dates	Details	Image
Maryland	Bethesda	December 2	President Biden flew on Marine One to visit and he delivered remarks on the emerging Omicron variant at the National Institutes of Health.	
Missouri	Kansas City	December 8	Arriving via Kansas City International Airport, President Biden delivered remarks on the Infrastructure Investment and Jobs Act at Kansas City Area Transportation Authority.	
Delaware	Wilmington, Greenville	December 10–12	Arriving via Brandywine Creek State Park on Marine One, President Biden and First Lady Jill Biden visited their Delaware home for weekend. Upon arrival, President Biden appeared on The Tonight Show Starring Jimmy Fallon virtually. On Saturday, he delivered remarks at Chase Center on the Riverfront and he attended Mass at St. Joseph on the Brandywine in Greenville.	
Kentucky	Fort Campbell, Mayfield, Dawson Springs	December 15	Arriving via Campbell Army Airfield, President Biden visited and surveyed damage from the Tornado outbreak of December 10–11, 2021 via an areal tour. He flew to Mayfield Graves County Airport on Marine One to receive a briefing from local leaders on the impacts of the 2021 Western Kentucky tornado. He then flew to Princeton-Caldwell County Airport on Marine One, toured a neighborhood and delivered remarks in Dawson Springs.	
South Carolina	Orangeburg	December 17	Arriving via Columbia Metropolitan Airport, President Biden delivered remarks at a commencement ceremony at SHM Memorial Center on the campus of South Carolina State University. He then traveled to Wilmington via Philadelphia International Airport.	
Delaware	Wilmington, Greenville	December 17–20	Arriving via Philadelphia International Airport and flying to Wilmington-New Castle Airport on Marine One, President Biden and First Lady Jill Biden visited their Delaware home for the weekend. On Saturday, they both attended Mass and visited the burial site of President Biden's first wife Neilia Hunter Biden and first daughter Naomi at their home parish, St. Joseph on the Brandywine in Greenville with their son Hunter Biden on their 49th anniversary of their death.	
Delaware	Rehoboth Beach, Wilmington	December 27–31	Arriving via Cape Henlopen State Park on Marine One, President Biden and First Lady Jill Biden spent the night at their Delaware beach home. On December 29, they celebrated New Year's Holiday in Wilmington at their Delaware home. On December 30, President Biden held a phone call with Russian President Vladimir Putin. On December 31, they stopped for brunch of lunch at Banks' Seafood Kitchen.	

== See also ==
- List of international presidential trips made by Joe Biden
- Lists of presidential trips made by Joe Biden
