= Hallie Olivere Biden =

American school counselor (born 1973)

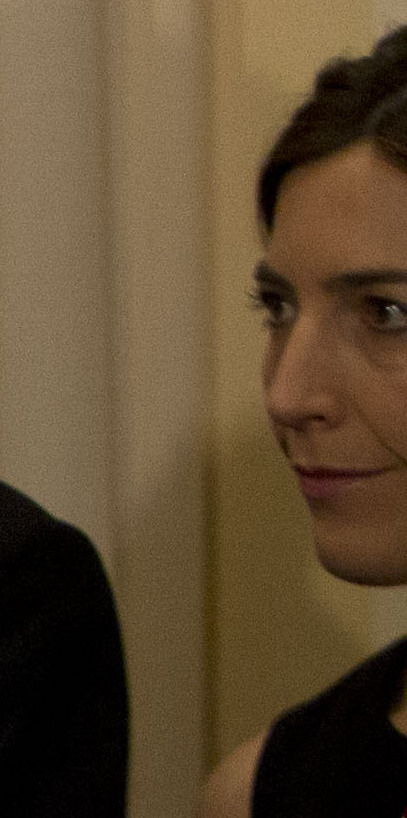
- Biden in 2013
- Born: July 6, 1973 (age 53); Greenville, Delaware, U.S.
- Education: Tatnall School
- Occupations: School counselor; nonprofit executive
- Political party: Democratic
- Spouses: Beau Biden (m. 2002; died 2015) John Hopkins Anning (m. 2024)
- Partner: Hunter Biden (2016–2019)
- Children: 2

Hallie Olivere Biden (née Olivere; born July 6, 1973) is an American school counselor, nonprofit executive, and member of the Biden family. She worked as a school counselor at the Tatnall School in Wilmington, Delaware, and at Archmere Academy in Claymont, Delaware. In 2002, she married Beau Biden, a son of U.S. President Joe Biden and Neilia Hunter Biden. They lived in Wilmington while her husband served as the Attorney General of Delaware.

After her husband's death from glioblastoma in 2015, Biden became the chairwoman of the board of directors for the Beau Biden Foundation for the Protection of Children. She received media attention and scrutiny for her romantic relationship with Beau's brother Hunter Biden from 2016 to 2019.

== Early life and education ==
Biden was born on July 6, 1973, in Greenville, Delaware, to Louis Ronald "Ron" Olivere and Joan Berger. Her mother, who was a childhood friend of Joe Biden, owned a dry-cleaning business. Her mother is of Jewish descent. She was educated at the Tatnall School, a private college preparatory school near Wilmington.

== Career ==
Biden worked as an admissions counselor at her alma mater, the Tatnall School, and as a guidance counselor at Archmere Academy. She chairs the Board of Directors for the Beau Biden Foundation For the Protection of Children.

== Personal life ==
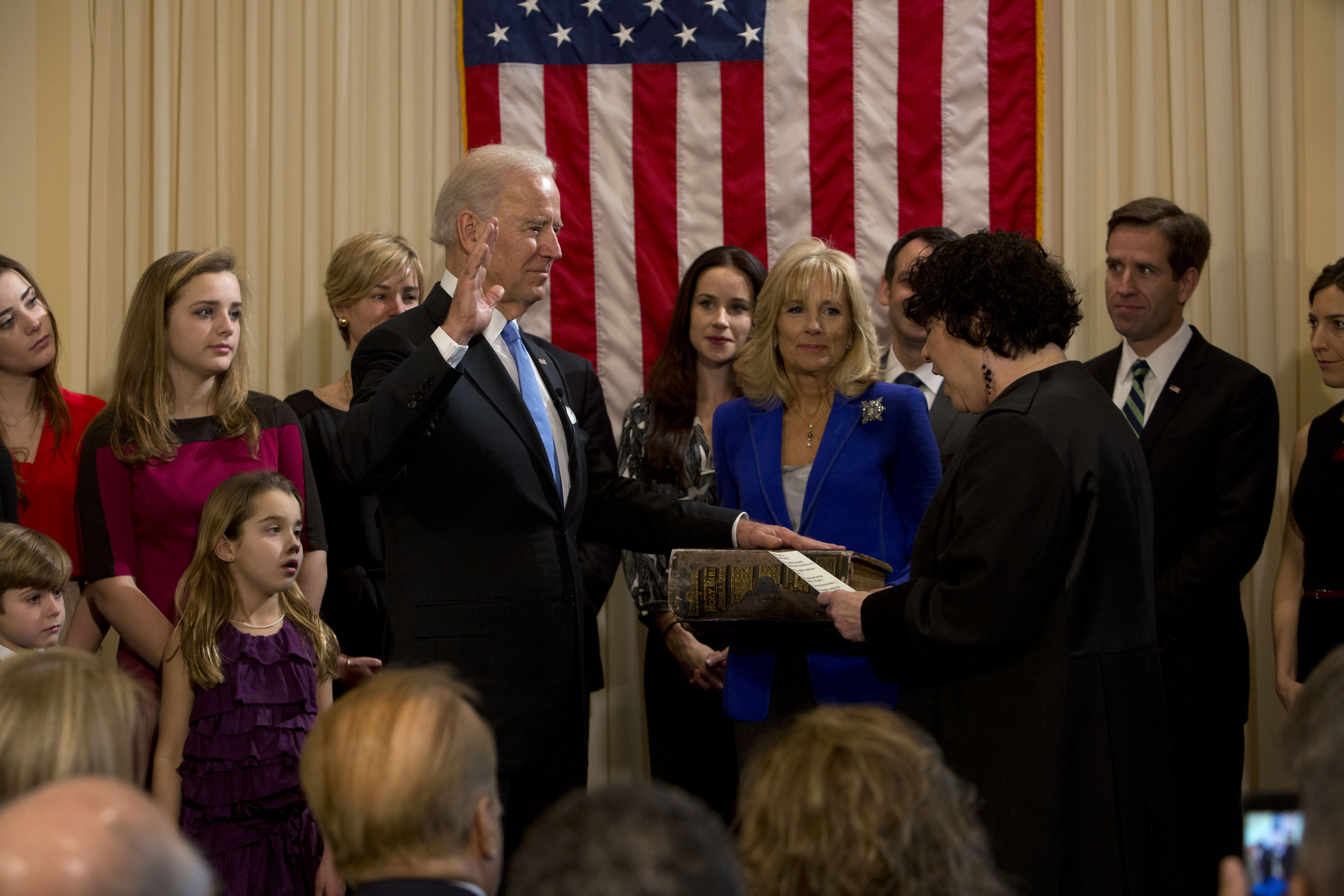
Biden (far right) at the swearing in of her father-in-law as Vice President of the United States in 2013.

In 1998, she began dating her childhood friend Joseph Robinette "Beau" Biden III, who worked as a federal prosecutor in the United States Attorney's Office for the Eastern District of Pennsylvania. The two became engaged during a family Thanksgiving celebration in Nantucket. They married in 2002. They had two children, Natalie Naomi Biden (b. 2004) and Robert Hunter Biden II (b. 2006). The family lived in Wilmington while Beau served as Attorney General of Delaware.

Beau Biden died of brain cancer in 2015. Biden maintained a close relationship with other members of the Biden family after her husband's death, encouraging her father-in-law to run in the 2016 presidential election, consulting him before the launch of his 2020 presidential campaign and attending mass with the family at St. Joseph on the Brandywine.

In 2016, she began a relationship with her brother-in-law, Hunter Biden, who was in the process of separating from his wife, Kathleen Buhle. She and Hunter moved to Annapolis, Maryland, with her children. They ended their relationship in 2019. In March 2019, The Key School sued Biden, saying she had failed to pay $55,740 in tuition for her two children for the 2018–19 school year. The suit was settled in October 2019. In 2024, she married John Hopkins Anning.
