= Wilmington General Hospital =

Hospital in Delaware, United States

Coordinates: 39.7426°N 75.5689°W

Wilmington General Hospital was a hospital in South Broom Street, Wilmington, which opened in 1928 and closed in 1985.

== History ==
The Wilmington General Hospital complex consisted of multiple buildings, constructed in a Georgian style, and encompassed both sides of Broom street.

The complex first became known as Wilmington General Hospital Association in 1928 when it opened to the public with approximately 80 beds. The hospital went through a series of expansions which included the addition of a maternity unit in 1938.

In 1972, the to-be Senator Joe Biden’s first wife Neilia Hunter Biden and their infant daughter Naomi were taken to Wilmington General Hospital after a car accident. They were pronounced dead on arrival. The Bidens' sons, Beau and Hunter, were also taken there and treated for injuries. Shortly after the accident, Joe Biden was sworn into the U.S. Senate inside the hospital.

The hospital closed and was demolished in 1985 and afterwards the area became residential housing.

This historic hospital named "Wilmington General hospital" is often confused with ChristianaCare's modern "Wilmington Hospital Christiana" due to similarity in name and a series of hospital closures and consolidations that occurred in Wilmington during the 20th century that involved both the old historic hospital and the newer Christiana Care health system.
