= Beau Biden Foundation =

American non-profit organization

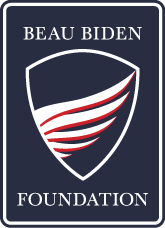
- Official logo of the Beau Biden Foundation
- Company type: Non-profit organization
- Founded: June 2015
- Founder: Joe Biden
- Headquarters: Wilmington, Delaware, U.S.
- Key people: Joe Biden; Jill Biden; Hunter Biden; Ashley Biden; Beau Biden
- Total assets: $3,373,963 (2020)
- Owner: Family of Joe Biden
- Members: Patricia Dailey Lewis., Esq, Chief Executive Officer
- Website: beaubidenfoundation.org

The Beau Biden Foundation for the Protection of Children is an American 501(c)(3) non-profit organization started by President Joe Biden in June 2015, a month after the death of his son Beau Biden. The Biden family sits on the board. It works to combat child abuse by educating adults and children. It is headquartered in Wilmington, Delaware. Patricia Dailey Lewis is CEO of the foundation, after Joshua Alcorn. The foundation received some of its funds from the Biden Foundation. In 2016, the foundation launched The Safe to Compete Delaware Pilot Initiative, a pilot program with the Boys & Girls Clubs of Delaware.
