= Family of Joe Biden =

American presidential family

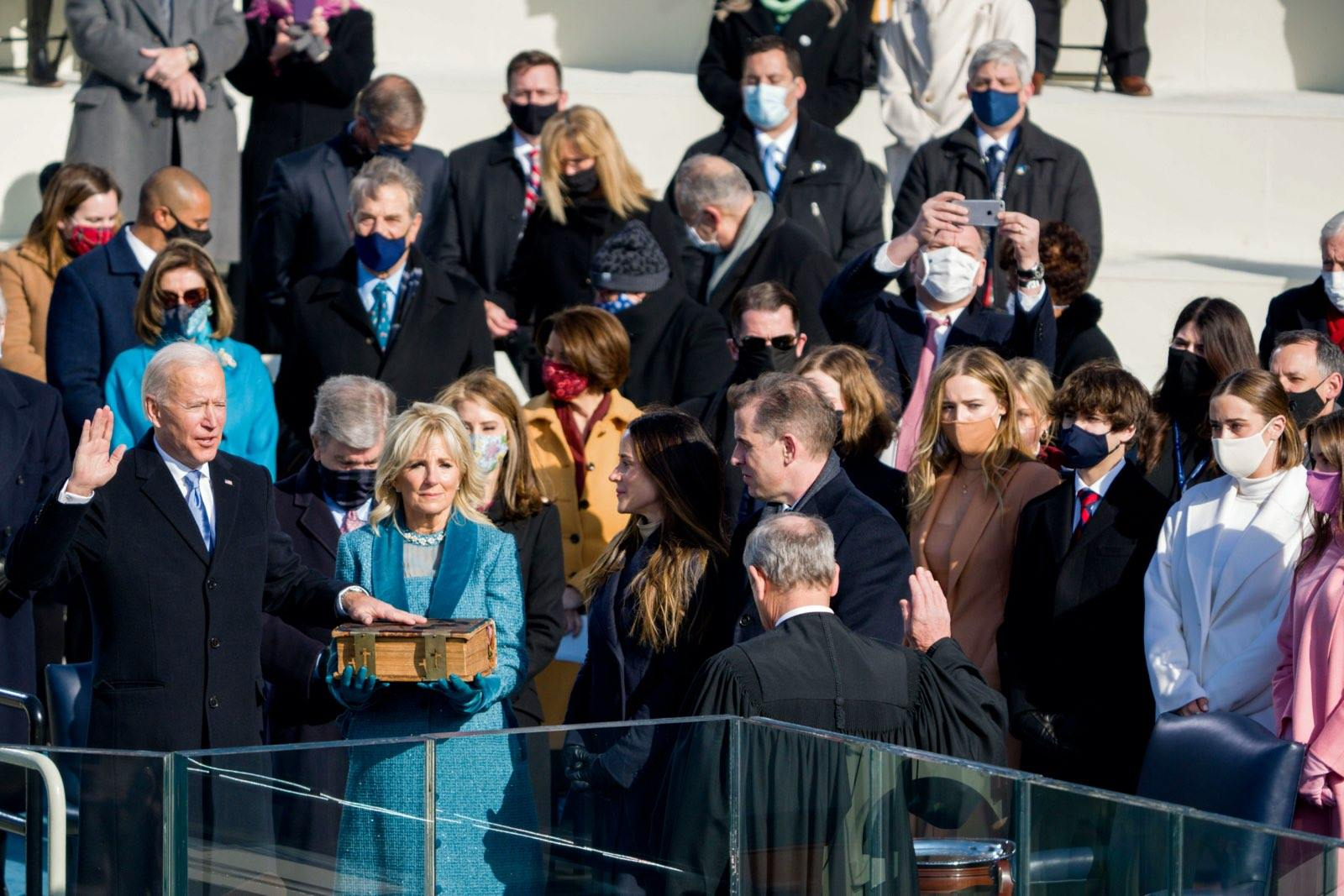
- Joe Biden, surrounded by members of his family, as he takes the presidential oath of office at his inauguration ceremony in 2021
- Current region: Greenville, Delaware
- Titles: List: President of the United States; First Lady of the United States; Vice President of the United States; Second Lady of the United States; United States Senator from Delaware; Attorney General of Delaware; New Castle County Council Member
- Members: Joe Biden; Jill Biden; Beau Biden; Hunter Biden; Ashley Biden; James Biden
- Connected members: Neilia Hunter Biden; Valerie Biden Owens; Howard Krein; Edward Francis Blewitt

The family of Joe Biden, the 46th president of the United States, includes members prominent in law, education, activism and politics. Biden's immediate family was the first family of the United States from 2021 to 2025 during Biden's presidency. They were also the second family of the United States from 2009 to 2017 during Biden's vice presidency under Barack Obama. Biden's family is mostly descended from the British Isles, with most of their ancestors coming from Ireland and England, and a smaller number descending from the French.

Of Biden's 16 great-great-grandparents, 10 of them were born in Ireland. He is descended from the Blewitts of County Mayo and the Finnegans of County Louth. One of Biden's great-great-great-grandfathers was born in Sussex, England, and emigrated to Maryland in the United States by 1820.

In the closing months of the Biden administration, several members of his family, including his son, his siblings and his in-laws, were issued presidential pardons. Biden stated that the pardons were issued not because of any wrongdoing, but to protect his family from political retribution from his successor Donald Trump.

== Wives ==
=== Neilia Hunter Biden ===
Neilia Hunter Biden, the first wife of Joe Biden, was born on July 28, 1942. The couple married on August 27, 1966. After the wedding, the Bidens moved to Wilmington, Delaware, where Biden was on the New Castle County Council. The couple had three children: Joseph Robinette "Beau" III, Robert Hunter, and Naomi Christina "Amy". Biden campaigned to unseat the U.S. Senator from Delaware J. Caleb Boggs; Neilia was described by The News Journal as the "brains" of his victorious campaign.

On December 18, 1972, while her husband was still a U.S. senator-elect, Neilia was driving with Naomi, Beau, and Hunter to buy a Christmas tree. Neilia "drove into the path" of a tractor-trailer, "possibly because her head was turned and she didn't see the oncoming truck". Neilia and the children were taken to Wilmington General Hospital. Neilia and Naomi died upon arrival, but her two sons survived with serious injuries. Biden was sworn in to the U.S. Senate on January 3, 1973, at the hospital where his sons were being treated. Neilia and Naomi were buried in St. Joseph on the Brandywine Cemetery in Greenville, Delaware.

=== Jill Biden ===
Jill Tracy Jacobs Biden (née Jacobs, formerly Stevenson), the second and current wife of Joe Biden, was born on June 3, 1951. She met Biden on a blind date in March 1975.

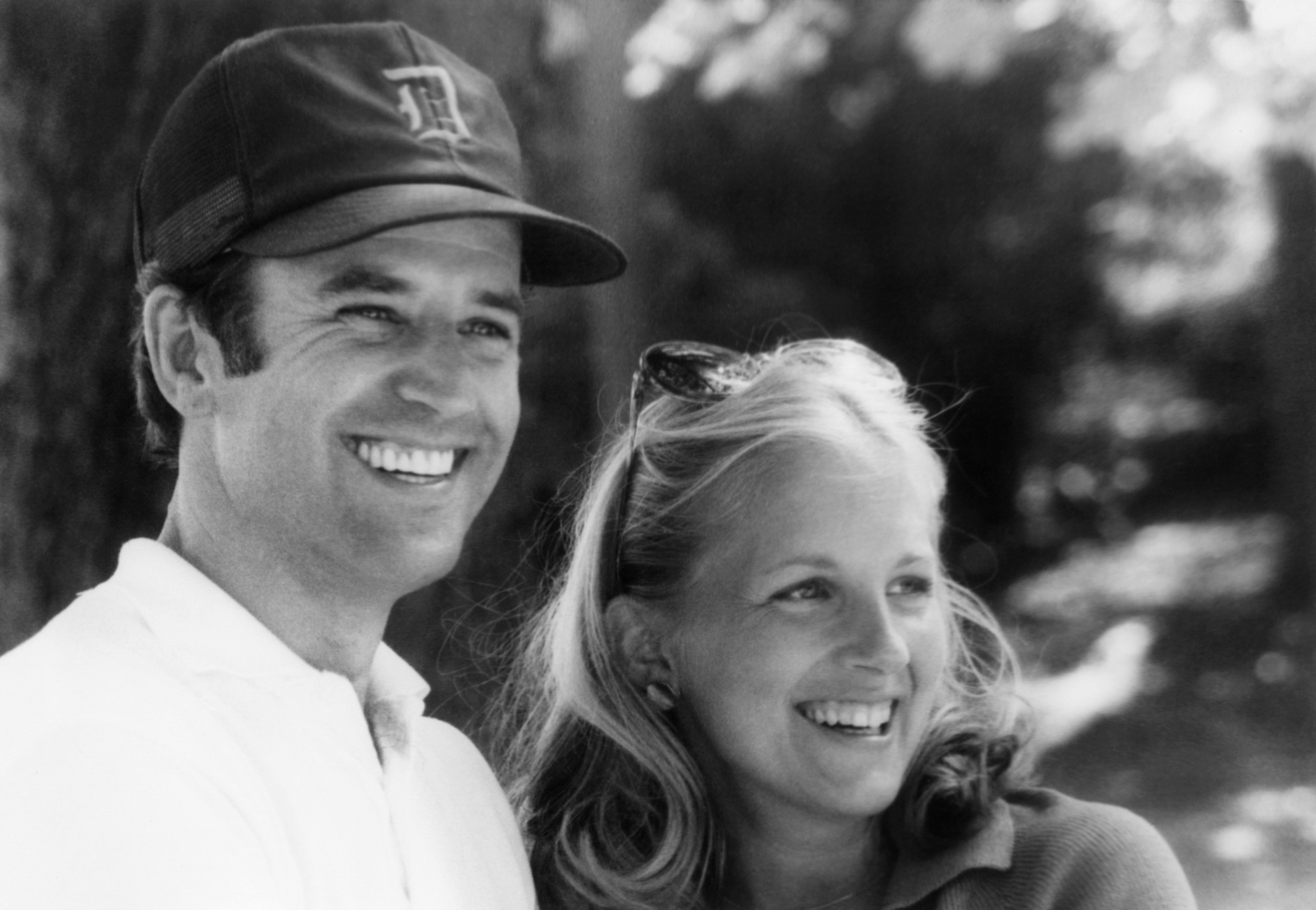
Joe and Jill, soon after meeting in the 1970s

She and Joe Biden were married by a Catholic priest on June 17, 1977, at the Chapel at the United Nations in New York City. This was four and a half years after his first wife and infant daughter died; Joe had proposed several times before she accepted, as she was wary of entering the public spotlight, anxious to remain focused on her own career, and initially hesitant to take on the commitment of raising his two young sons who had survived the accident.

Joe Biden has opined that the key to his long-lasting marriage with Jill Biden is having "good sex".

== Children ==
Joe Biden fathered four children from two marriages. His firstborn daughter (third child), Naomi Christina Biden, died in December 1972, in the same car accident as her mother. His firstborn son and first child, Joseph "Beau" R. Biden III, died in May 2015 from brain cancer. The Bidens' two surviving children include one son from his first marriage, Robert Hunter Biden, and one daughter from his second, Ashley Blazer Biden.

=== Beau Biden ===
Joseph "Beau" Robinette Biden III was born on February 3, 1969, in Wilmington, Delaware. Beau suffered multiple broken bones in the car crash that killed his mother and sister, but he survived after spending several months in a hospital. Beau went on to graduate from Archmere Academy, his father's high school alma mater, and the University of Pennsylvania in 1991, where he was a member of the Psi Upsilon fraternity. He was also a graduate of Syracuse University College of Law, as was his father. After graduating from law school, he clerked for Judge Steven McAuliffe of the United States District Court of New Hampshire. From 1995 to 2004, he worked at the United States Department of Justice in Philadelphia, first as Counsel to the Office of Policy Development and later as a federal prosecutor in the U.S. Attorney's Office.

He married Hallie Olivere in 2002.

In his first bid at political office, Biden ran for Attorney General of Delaware in 2006. Biden's opponent was a veteran state prosecutor and Assistant U.S. Attorney, Ferris Wharton. Major issues in the campaign included the candidates' experience and proposed efforts to address sex offenders, Internet predators, senior abuse and domestic abuse. Biden won the election by approximately five percentage points.

Beau played an active role in his father's 2008 vice presidential campaign, speaking at the Democratic National Convention after Joe Biden was nominated for Vice President of the United States. He recounted the auto accident that killed his mother and sister and the subsequent parenting commitment his father made to his sons, a speech at which many delegates wept.

On November 2, 2010, he was easily reelected to a second term as Delaware Attorney General, beating Independent Party of Delaware candidate Doug Campbell by a large margin.

For the final few years of his life, Biden suffered from a brain tumor. In May 2010, he was admitted to Christiana Hospital in Newark, Delaware, after complaining of a headache, numbness, and paralysis. Officials said he had suffered a "mild stroke". Later that month, Biden was transferred to Thomas Jefferson University Hospital in Philadelphia and kept for observation for several days.

In August 2013, Biden was admitted to the University of Texas MD Anderson Cancer Center in Houston and diagnosed with brain cancer, after experiencing what White House officials called "an episode of disorientation and weakness". A lesion was removed at that time. Biden had radiation and chemotherapy treatments and the cancer remained stable. On May 20, 2015, he was admitted to Walter Reed National Military Medical Center in Bethesda, Maryland, because of a recurrence of brain cancer. He died there ten days later, on May 30, 2015, at the age of 46. His funeral was held at St. Anthony of Padua Roman Catholic Church in Wilmington, Delaware, on June 6, 2015. He was buried at St. Joseph on the Brandywine in Greenville, Delaware.

=== Hunter Biden ===
Robert Hunter Biden was born on February 4, 1970, in Wilmington, Delaware. Along with his mother and siblings, he was in the 1972 crash, sustaining injuries to his skull. Along with his older brother, he survived after receiving months of medical treatment. Like his father and brother, Hunter attended Archmere Academy in Claymont, Delaware. He graduated with a Bachelor of Arts degree in history from Georgetown University in 1992. During the year after he graduated from college, he served as a Jesuit volunteer at a church in Portland, Oregon, and met Kathleen Buhle, whom he married in 1993. After attending Georgetown University Law Center for one year, he transferred to Yale Law School and graduated in 1996. He and Kathleen divorced in 2017 and, in 2019, he married Melissa Cohen.

After law school, Hunter accepted a position at bank holding company MBNA America, a major contributor to his father's political campaigns. By 1998, Biden had risen to the rank of executive vice president.

During the 2020 election, the Trump administration pointed out that Hunter Biden had connections with the Ukrainian holding company Burisma.

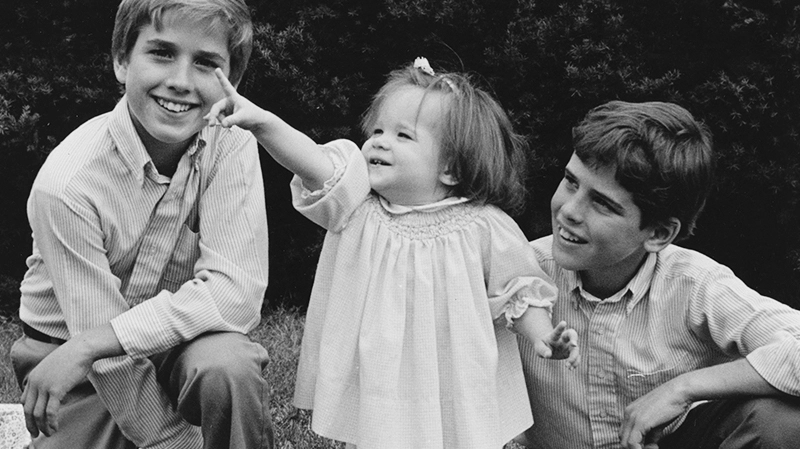
Beau, Ashley and Hunter Biden as young children, c. 1983

In September 2024, Hunter Biden pleaded guilty to all nine charges in his federal tax evasion case, surprising prosecutors as they prepared for trial. He previously denied deliberately evading $1.4 million in taxes from 2016 to 2019. Biden had been indicted with three felony tax offenses and six misdemeanor offenses, which included tax evasion and filing false returns. Facing up to 17 years in prison, Biden was set for sentencing on December 16, 2024.

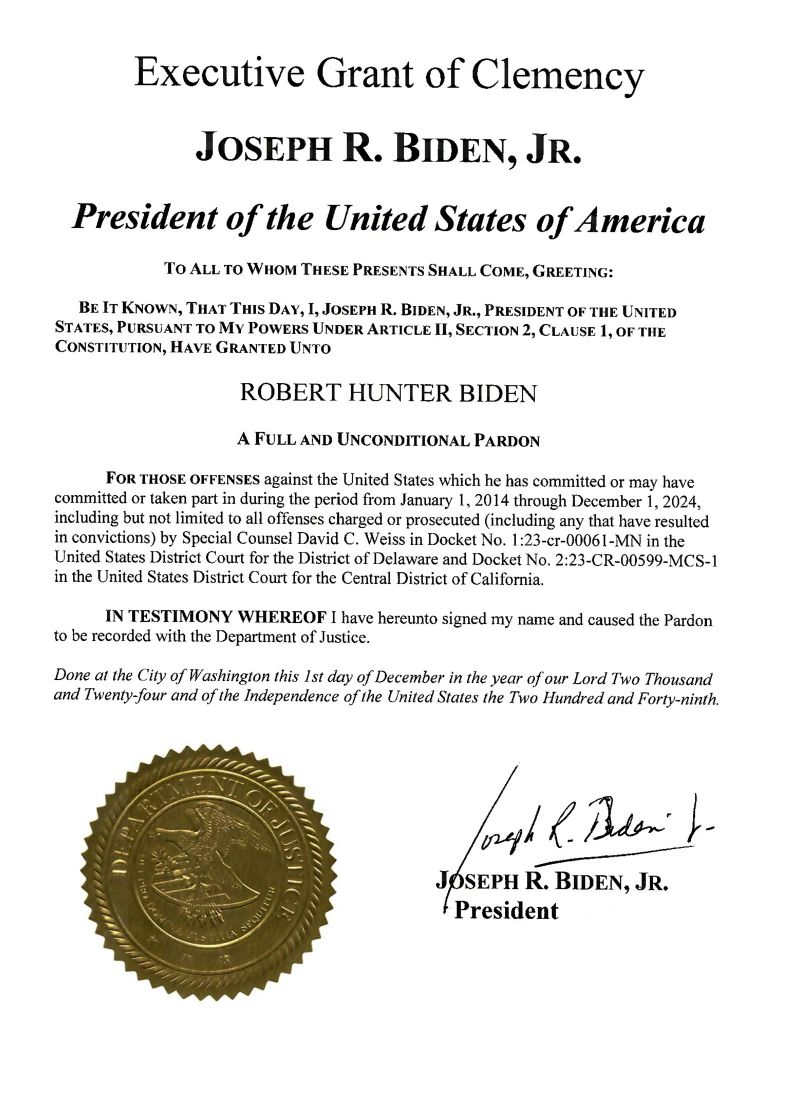
Pardon for Hunter Biden dated December 1, 2024

On December 1, 2024, President Biden issued a full and unconditional pardon for his son Hunter. The pardon covered all federal offenses committed between January 1, 2014, and December 1, 2024, and included his tax charges, gun charges, and any other potential crimes committed within that time.

The pardon received bipartisan criticism from members of Congress as harming the justice system. In the months leading up to Hunter's scheduled sentencing, the President had made repeated statements that he would not use the pardon authority for his own son. He and his staff continued to state that there would be no pardon for Hunter as late as November, although internal staff discussions affirmed that the option for a pardon would remain on the table even as Biden publicly stated otherwise.

=== Naomi "Amy" Biden ===
Naomi Christina Biden, nicknamed "Amy", was born on November 8, 1971, in Wilmington, Delaware. She died in the same car crash as her mother, Neilia, on December 18, 1972, when she was just over a year old. She was buried with her mother in St. Joseph on the Brandywine Cemetery in Greenville, Delaware.

=== Ashley Biden ===
Ashley Blazer Biden was born on June 8, 1981, in Wilmington, Delaware. She is the only child from Joe Biden's second marriage. Ashley Biden attended Wilmington Friends School, a private school run by the Religious Society of Friends in Wilmington. When she was in elementary school, she discovered that the cosmetics company Bonne Bell tested its products on animals. She wrote a letter to the company asking them to change their policy on animal testing. She later got involved in dolphin conservation, inspiring her father to work with Congresswoman Barbara Boxer to write and pass the 1990 Dolphin Protection Consumer Information Act. Ashley Biden made an appearance before members of the United States Congress to lobby for the legislation. She is married to physician Howard Krein.

== Grandchildren ==
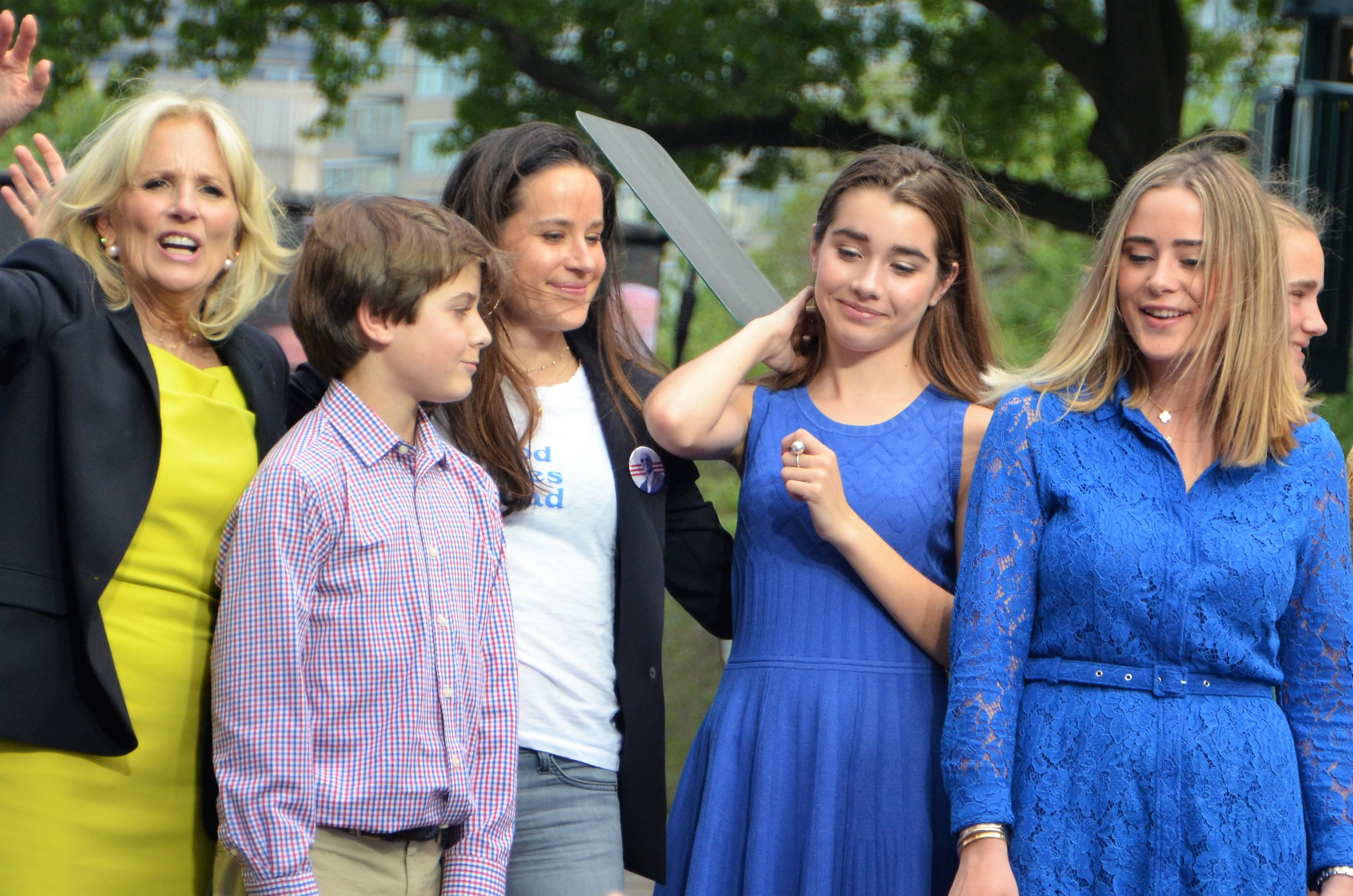
A 2019 photo of Jill Biden with members of the Biden family

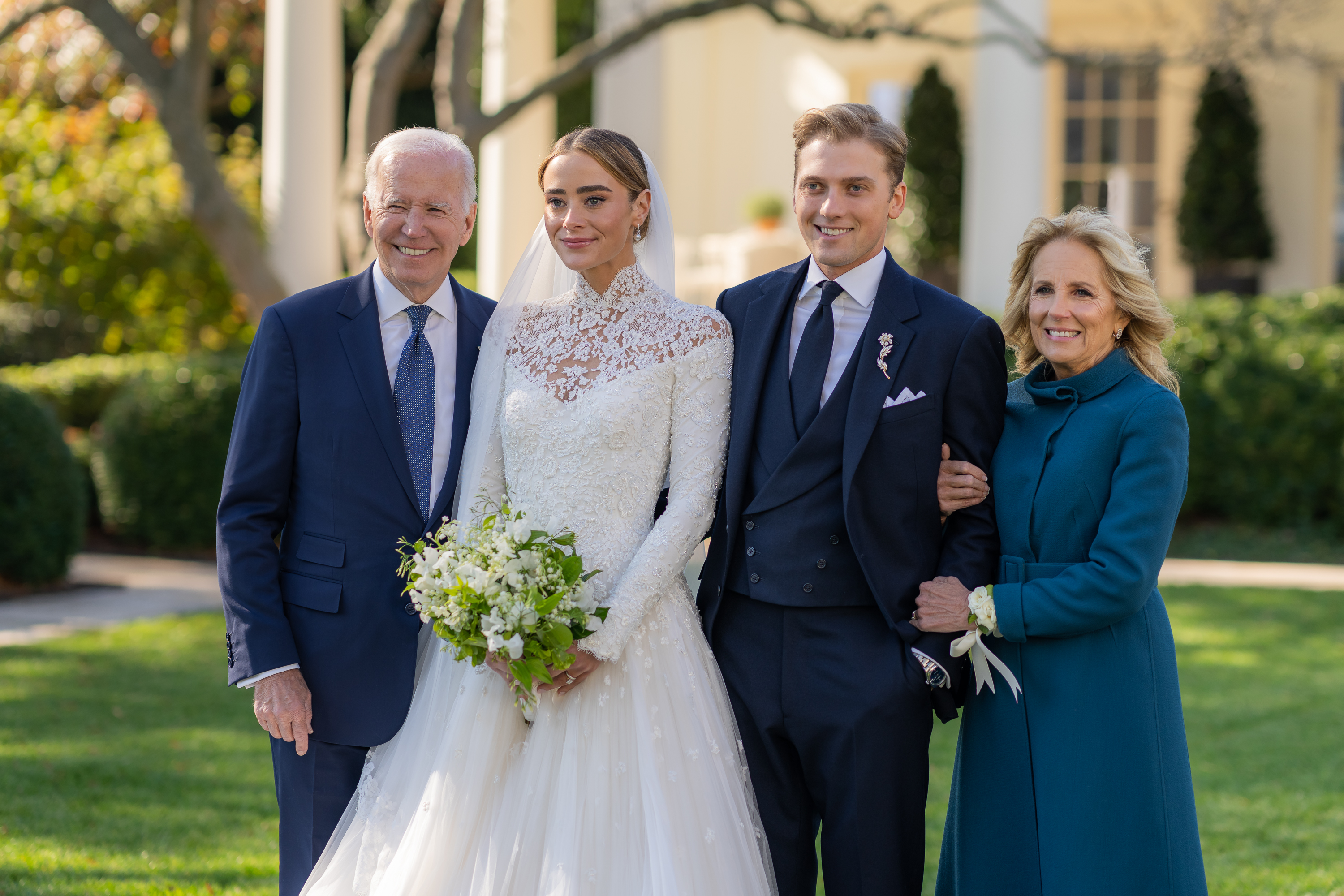
Naomi Biden with husband Peter Neal, Joe Biden, and Jill Biden on the White House South Lawn for her 2022 wedding

Joe Biden has married twice and fathered four children. His seven grandchildren come from his two sons, five from Hunter and two from Beau. He is the first president to become a great-grandfather while in office.

- from Beau Biden (1969–2015),
  - Two grandchildren with wife Hallie Olivere
    - Natalie Naomi Biden (b. 2004)
    - Robert Hunter Biden II (b. 2006)
- from Hunter Biden (b. 1970)
  - Three granddaughters with first wife Kathleen Buhle
    - Naomi King Biden (b. 1993)
      - One great-grandson with husband Peter Neal
    - Finnegan Biden (b. 2000)
    - Roberta Mabel "Maisy" Biden (b. 2001)
  - One granddaughter with Lunden Roberts
    - Navy Joan Roberts (b. 2018)
  - One grandson with second wife Melissa Cohen
    - Beau Biden Jr. (b. 2020)

== Pets ==
Biden had a German Shepherd, Major. Major is a rescue dog who was adopted from the Delaware Humane Association by Joe and Jill Biden in 2018, but he was given to family friends after a biting incident at the White House.

Biden had another German Shepherd, Champ, who was with the Bidens when Joe Biden was vice president from 2009 to 2017, but died early into Joe Biden's term as president. In December 2021, Biden announced the addition of a puppy named Commander to his family. On January 28, 2022, the Bidens announced that they had adopted Willow, a tabby cat.

== Tree of descendants ==
Neilia Hunter; 1942–1972	Joseph Robinette; Biden Jr. b. 1942	Jill Tracy Jacobs b. 1951
Joseph Robinette "Beau"; Biden III; 1969–2015	Robert Hunter Biden b. 1970	Naomi Christina Biden; 1971–1972	Ashley Blazer Biden b. 1981
Natalie Naomi Biden b. 2004	Robert Hunter Biden II b. 2006	Naomi King Biden b. 1993	Finnegan Biden b. 2000	Maisy Biden b. 2001	Navy Joan Roberts b. 2018	Beau Biden b. 2020
William Brannon Neal IV b. 2025

Joe Biden

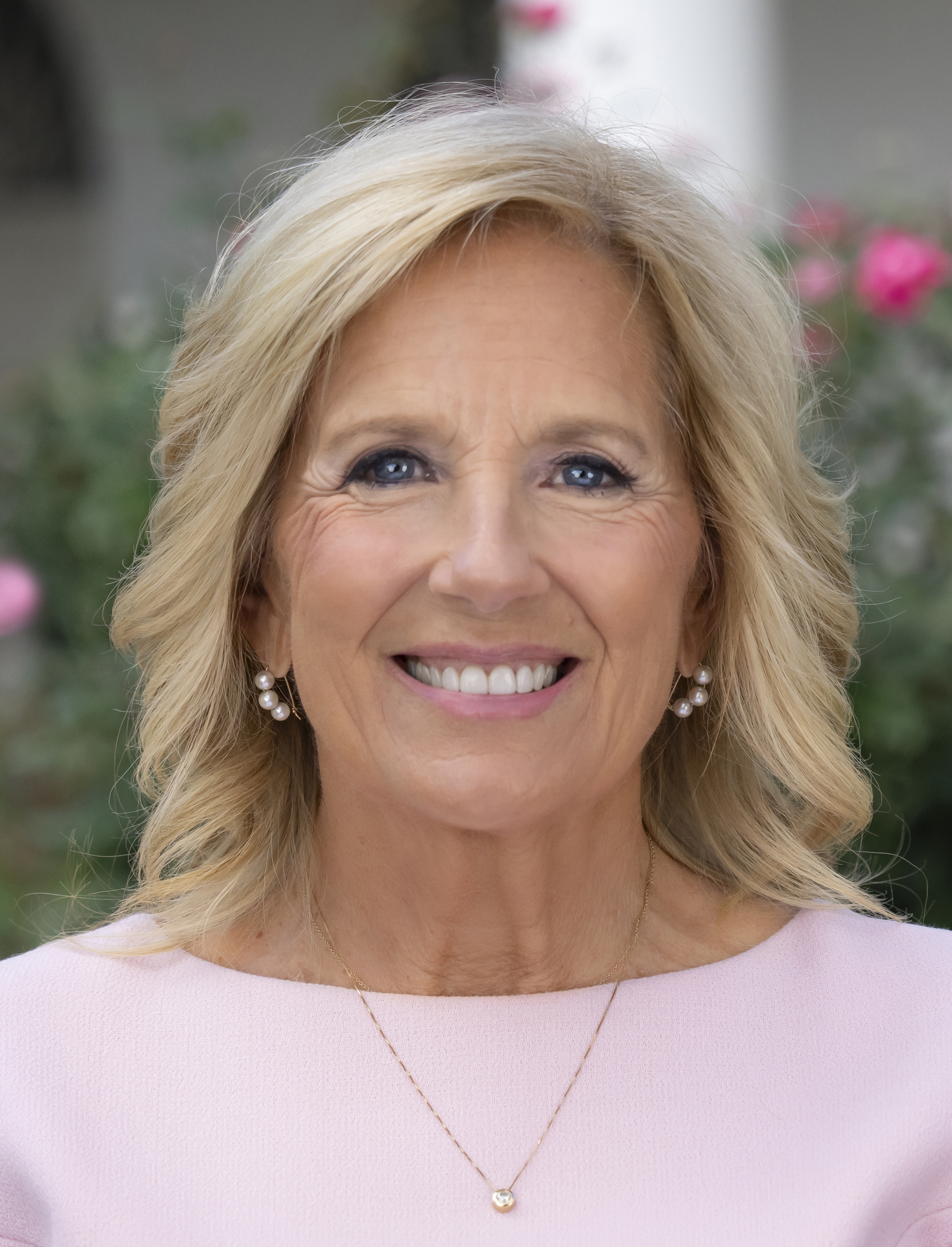
Jill Biden

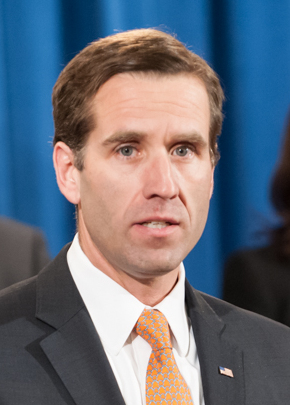
Beau Biden

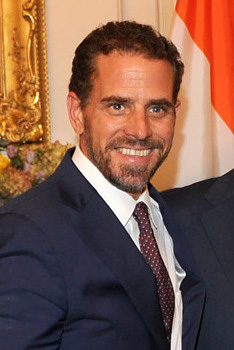
Hunter Biden

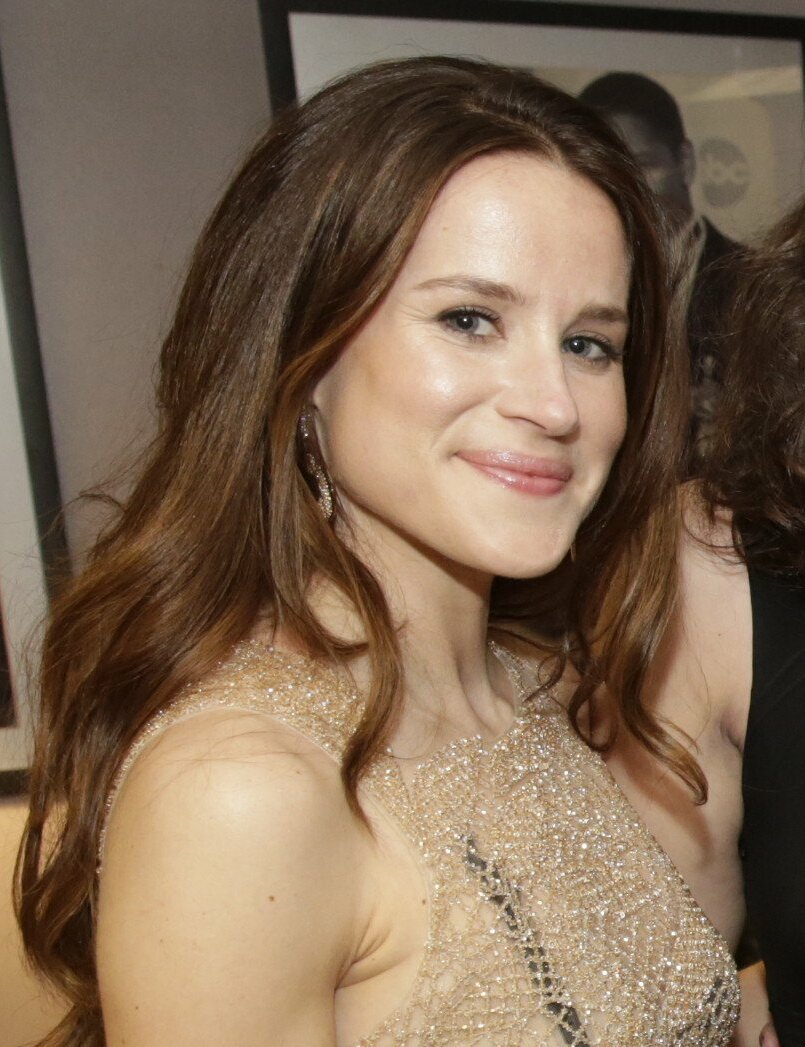
Ashley Biden

== Parents ==
Joseph Robinette "Joe" Biden Jr. was born on November 20, 1942, at St. Mary's Hospital in Scranton, Pennsylvania, to Catherine Eugenia "Jean" Biden (née Finnegan; July 7, 1917 – January 8, 2010) and Joseph Robinette Biden Sr. (November 13, 1915 – September 2, 2002), who married in 1941. After the death of Jean Finnegan Biden on January 8, 2010, President Barack Obama traveled to Wilmington, Delaware, to attend her January 12 funeral.

Joseph Sr. was initially wealthy but suffered financial setbacks around the time Joe Jr. was born, and for several years the family lived with Jean's parents. Scranton fell into economic decline during the 1950s and Joseph Sr. could not find steady work. Beginning in 1953, the family lived in an apartment in Claymont, Delaware, then moved to a house in Wilmington, Delaware. Joseph Sr. later became a successful used-car salesman, maintaining the family in a middle-class lifestyle.

Joe Sr. and Catherine are buried together at St. Joseph on the Brandywine Cemetery in Greenville, Delaware. Their gravesites are near the graves of their daughter-in-law Neilia Hunter Biden, their granddaughter Naomi, and grandson Beau.

== Siblings ==
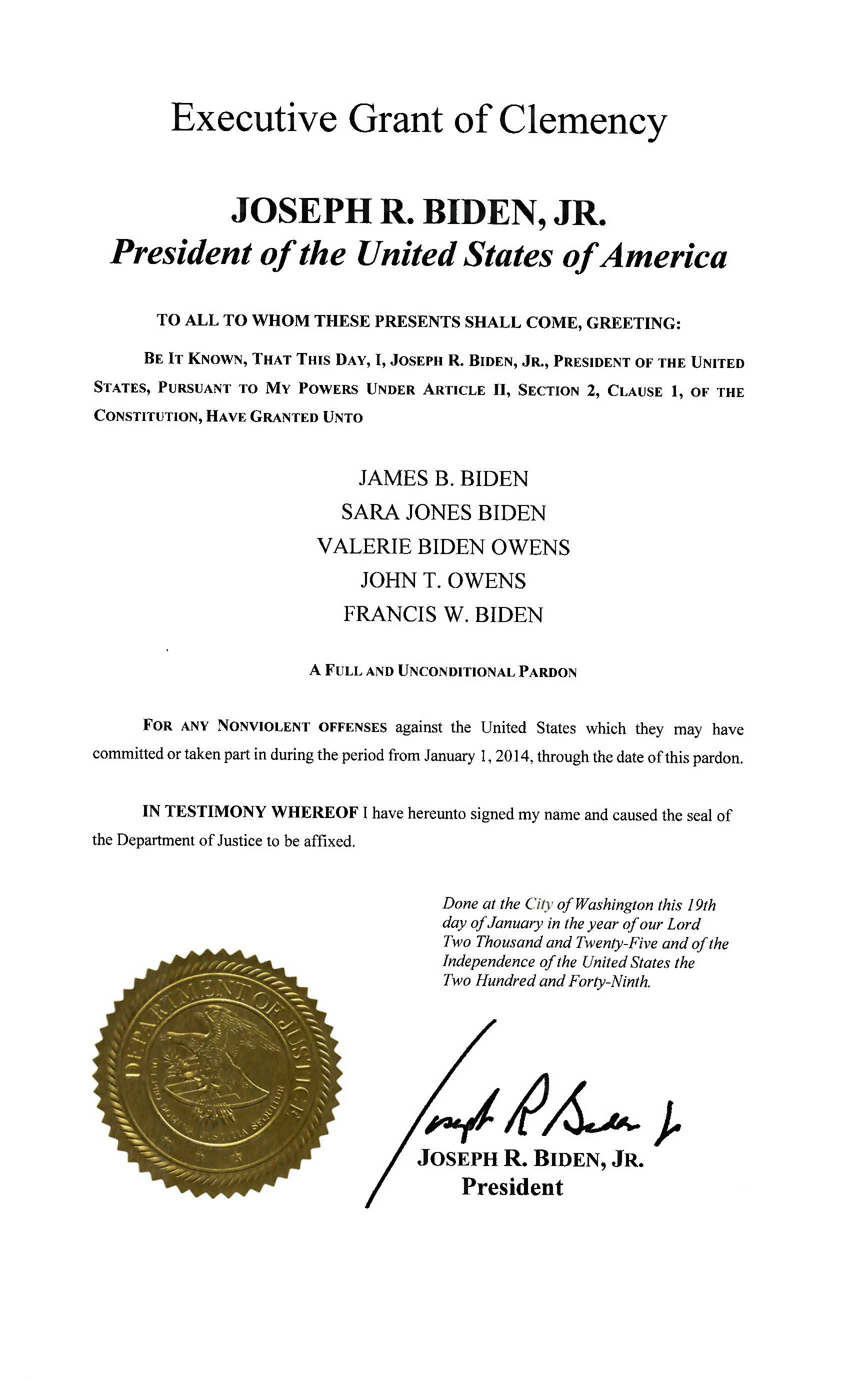
Pardon for Joe Biden's siblings and their spouses Dated January 19, 2025

Joe Biden is the oldest of four siblings in a Catholic family, followed by his younger sister Valerie Biden Owens (born 1945), and two younger brothers, James Brian "Jim" Biden (born 1949) and Francis William "Frank" Biden (born 1953). Valerie was one of the campaign managers for Joe Biden's presidential campaigns. Biden's niece Missy Owens (daughter of Valerie Biden Owens) has also worked in politics.

- Valerie Biden Owens (born November 5, 1945), campaign manager and political strategist. Appointed by Barack Obama as advisor to the United Nations 71st General Assembly. She played a pivotal role in all of her brother's political campaigns. She was the campaign manager during all of his Senate elections and for his 1988 and 2008 presidential campaigns, and was a senior advisor to his successful 2020 presidential campaign.
- James Brian "Jim" Biden (born 1949), healthcare executive. According to a The Washington Post profile, he is "known in the family as the one who’s always ready to help" and "has a history of business dealings that resulted in recriminations and lawsuits."
- Francis William "Frank" Biden (born 1953), non-attorney advisor to Bergman Law Group, Boca Raton, Florida.

In the final minutes of his presidency, Joe Biden issued pardons for his three siblings as well as their spouses. He explained that his decision was not due to any wrongdoing on their part, but rather out of concern about potential political backlash from President-elect Donald J. Trump.

== Grandparents ==
=== Paternal ===
Joseph Sr.'s parents, Mary Elizabeth (née Robinette) Biden (1894–1943) and Joseph Harry Biden (1893–1941), an oil businessman from Baltimore, Maryland, were of English, French, and Irish descent.

Biden's paternal third great-grandfather, William Biden (1787–1849), a stonemason, was born in England and emigrated to the United States by 1820, where he settled in Maryland. According to historian Eddy Greenfield, he was born in Sussex, and was christened at St John the Baptist's Church in Westbourne, West Sussex, on 8 March 1789. William was the second child and son of James Byden (born November 1767) and Ann Silverlock (born March 1766), who had married on 16 May 1785. James Byden, Biden's paternal fourth great-grandfather, was from Pagham. He was the son of Richard Byden, Biden's paternal fifth great-grandfather, and his wife Susan, beyond which the paternal family line cannot be traced. Two of Biden's other third paternal great-grandfathers, Jesse Robinett and Thomas Randle, were slave owners in 19th-century Maryland.

A possible connection may also exist to the family of a William Henry Biden, who was from Houghton, Cambridgeshire, and lived from 1791 to 1843. This William Henry was a son of John Biden (died 28 July 1796) and his wife Ann Beaumont, who had married in 1781. The seventh of eight children and the family's fifth son, William Henry and his elder brother, Christopher Biden (1789–1858), served as officers in the East India Company merchant marine, both eventually becoming captains of East Indiamen. William Henry commanded mid-sized vessels before his death at Rangoon in 1843.

Christopher Biden subsequently became an official in the Madras Civil Service (later the Indian Civil Service), and his descendants settled in India. He died at Madras in 1858. In 1981, Christopher's great-great-grandson, Leslie Dunn Biden, then living in Nagpur, wrote to Joe Biden about the possible family connection after reading about him in the Illustrated Weekly of India. After discussing their genealogy, they promised to stay in touch but did not resume correspondence before Leslie's death in 1983. During a 2013 visit to India, Joe Biden referred to Leslie's letter, mentioning a "Biden from Mumbai" had suggested their "mutual great-great-great-great-something-or-other" named George had "worked for the East India Company back in the 1700s."

=== Maternal ===
Jean's parents were Geraldine (née Blewitt) Finnegan and Ambrose Joseph Finnegan from Scranton, Pennsylvania. Ambrose was born in Olyphant, Pennsylvania in 1883, and attended Santa Clara University where he was a star quarterback on their football team. After college, he worked for real estate investor Major Bowes in San Francisco until the 1906 San Francisco earthquake wiped out his boss's investments. He then returned to the Scranton area where he worked for many years as a newspaper advertising salesman and then as librarian for two Scranton newspapers. He died in 1957. In addition to Jean, Ambrose and Geraldine had a son, Ambrose J. Finnegan Jr., who died in the Pacific theater of World War II. The younger Ambrose's death received media attention decades later after Joe Biden said that Ambrose had been eaten by cannibals in New Guinea, which appears to be incorrect.

Jean was of Irish descent, with roots variously attributed to County Louth and County Londonderry. Irish genealogists presented Joe Biden with his Irish maternal family history on his visit there in 2016. Joe's matrilineal great-grandfather (Geraldine's father), Edward Francis Blewitt, the child of Irish emigrants from Rappagh, Ballina, County Mayo, was a member of the Pennsylvania State Senate.

== See also ==
- Family of Barack Obama, president for whom Biden served under as vice president (2009–2017)
- Family of Donald Trump, Biden's predecessor and successor as president (2017–2021 and since 2025)
- Family of Mike Pence, Biden's successor as vice president (2009-2017)
- Family of Kamala Harris, Biden's vice president (2021–2025)
