= St. Joseph on the Brandywine =

Historic Catholic church in Delaware, US

- U.S. National Register of Historic Places
- U.S. Historic district
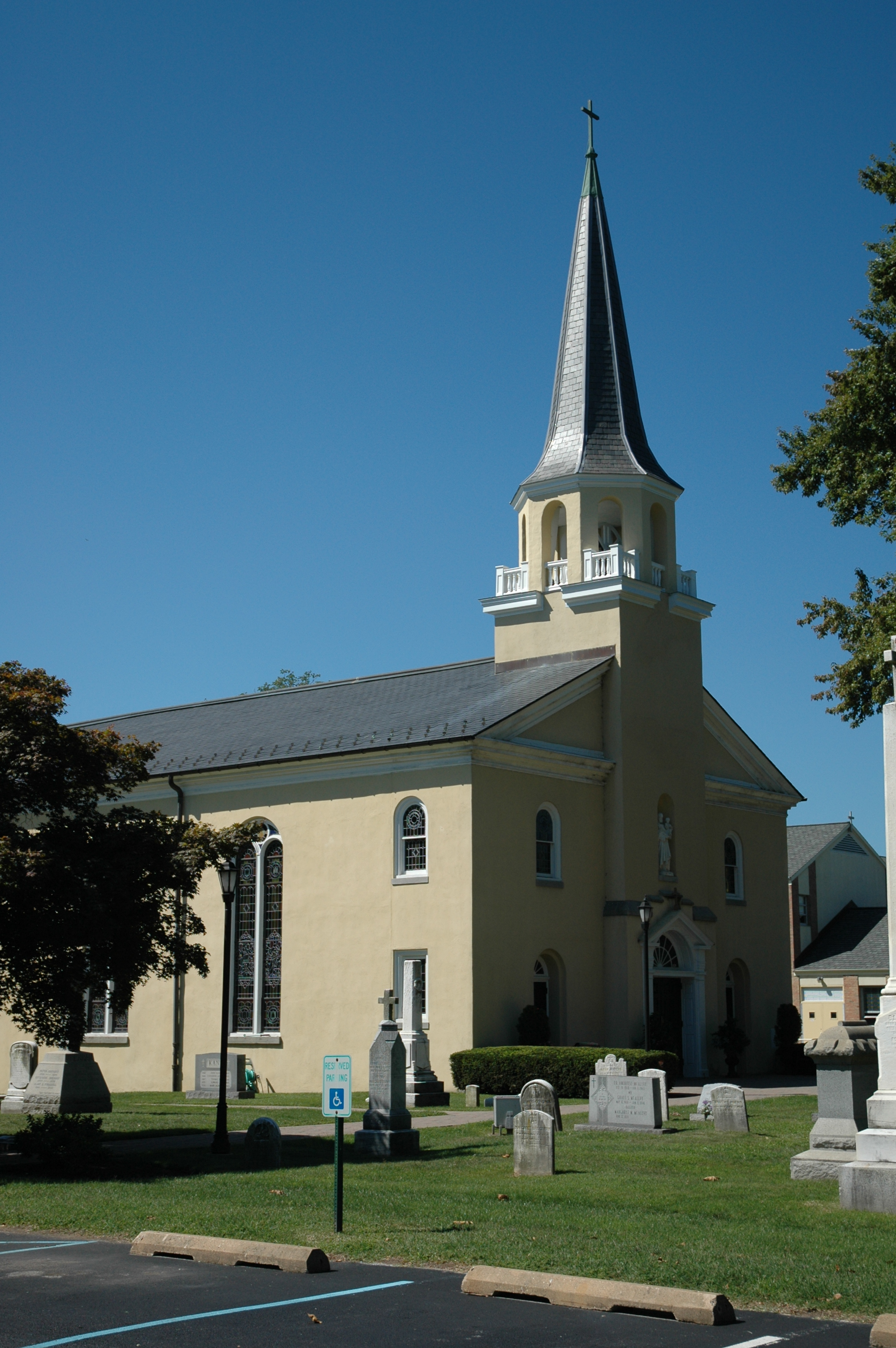
- St. Joseph on the Brandywine, August 2010

- Location within Delaware Location within the United States
- Location: 10 Old Church Road, Greenville, Delaware
- Coordinates: 39.7721°N 75.5885°W
- Area: 2 acres (0.81 ha)
- Built: 1841, 1848, 1878, 1941 and 1950
- NRHP reference No.: 76000572
- Added to NRHP: November 07, 1976

St. Joseph on the Brandywine, originally Saint Joseph's Church until St. Joseph's Church – Wilmington was built in 1947, is a parish of the Catholic Church in Greenville, Delaware, United States, in the Diocese of Wilmington. It is a historic parish church complex and national historic district located on Old Church Road. Since 2002 its old convent building has housed the diocesan archives, with records going back two centuries. It is also the home parish of the 46th President of the United States, Joe Biden.

== Campus ==
The complex encompasses four buildings as well as a large parish cemetery. The main church is a stuccoed stone structure, painted yellow, with the pedimented gable of the facade pierced by the church's steeple. The other buildings consist of a rectory, convent, and former school.

The school was opened in 1853 and was originally staffed by the Sisters of St. Joseph, and later by the Order of St. Francis in 1887.

== History ==
While there was a strong Catholic presence in the Wilmington area since 1813, Catholic masses were relegated to traveling priests at private homes and in the local manufacturing mills. Irish mills workers began petitioning the Diocese of Philadelphia for their own church in the region starting in the late 1830s. They were supported in their efforts by the Du Pont family, who contributed financial assets and political pressure to the establishment of the parish. The original church of St. Joseph was built in February 1841 by the Duponts for Irish and Italian Catholic workers at the E.I.DuPont de Nemours & Co. The land was originally granted by Charles I. du Pont, who also served on the original board of Trustees along with Alfred du Pont, Henry du Pont, Peter N. Brennan, Edward Dougherty, Charles Dougherty, and Michael Dougherty. The church itself was dedicated the following winter in December 1842 by Francis Kenrick, Bishop of Philadelphia.

Additions were made to the church structure in 1848 under Fr. John Walsh to accommodate 550 parishioners. In 1853, a house on the campus burned down and was rebuilt with the assistance of Amelia du Pont, who converted the building into a convent, thereafter inviting the Sisters of St. Joseph to occupy the grounds and open a parochial school through the parish. The parish school, which originally occupied the church basement, was moved in 1855 into its own building.

The parish house was destroyed in 1866 during a fire originating from the roof. The school was also shut down during this period as the Sisters of St. Joseph were recalled by James Frederick Wood, Archbishop of Philadelphia. The school would re-open under the direction of the sisters of the Order of St. Francis, as well as lay teachers from the parish. It would remain in operation under the sisters until the spring of 1972, when it was permanently shut down due to decreased attendance. The sisters have since vacated the campus to attend to their educational social mission elsewhere. Additional repairs and alterations to the church were made in 1878, 1941 and 1950, so much so that the present form displays very little of the original 1841 church structure. It was added to the National Register of Historic Places in 1976, a marker was placed on the campus in 2016 by the State of Delaware.

== Rectors ==
- Rev. Bernard E. McCabe, OSA: 1841–1842, previously built St. Malachi's Church in Coatesville (d. 1857) (killed after falling asleep while reading with a candle)
- Rev. John Frost: 1842
- Rev. Daniel Magorian: 1843–1846
- Rev. John S. Walsh: 1846–1867
- Rev. John Scanlan: 1867–1869
- Rev. George J. Kelly: 1869–1887
- Rev. Dennis J. Flynn (Assistant Pastor) 1883–1885, Later President of Mount St. Mary's College
- Rev. Edward Henchy SJ: 1887–1893, formerly President of Loyola College in Maryland
- Rev. Peter Donaghy: 1893, a native of Ireland and Gaelic-speaking priest, previously Assistant Pastor
- Rev. John D. Carly: 1893–1895
- Rev. George S. Bradford: 1895
- Rev. William J. Bermingham OP: 1895–1900
- Rev. William J. Scott: 1900–1926 (d. 1932)
- Rev. Martin McHale Ryan: 1926–1933
- Msgr. Patrick A. Brennan: 1933–1946 (d. 1950)
- Msgr. Francis X. Fitzpatrick: 1946–1950, later Vicar of St. Peter's Church – New Castle (d. 1972)
- Rev. Henry J. Dreyer: 1950–1966 (d. 1969)
- Rev. John L. Noonan SSJ: 1952–? (Assistant Pastor)
- Msgr. Henry I. Foltz: 1966–1977
- Msgr. Paul J. Schierse, Jr.: 1977–1992, Canon Lawyer and Chancellor of the Diocese of Wilmington (d. 1998)
- Rev. Peter P. Harney: 1990–1995 (Assistant Pastor)
- Rev. Stephen J. Connell, Jr.: 1992–1997; (Assistant Pastor) 1962–1963
- Rev. Joseph Wharton: (Assistant Pastor) 1994–1997
- Msgr. Thomas Cini: 1997–1998, Previously Principal of St. Mark's High School and St. Elizabeth's High School
- Rev. William Mathesius: (Assistant Pastor) 1997–1998
- Rev. David F. Kelley: 1998–1999
- Msgr. Joseph F. Rebman: 1999–2021
- Rev. John O. Barres: (Assistant Pastor) 2001–?
- Rev. Brian Lewis, (Assistant Pastor) 2018–2019
- Rev. Christopher R. Coffiey, (Assistant Pastor) 2019–2020
- Rev. Glenn Evers, (Assistant Pastor) 2020–2021
- Msgr. John P. Hopkins: 2021–Present

== Notable burials ==
- Joseph R. Biden Sr., (1915–2002): Father of Joe Biden
- Catherine Eugenia Finnegan Biden, (1917–2010): Mother of Joe Biden
- Joseph R. Biden III, (1969–2015): 44th Attorney General of Delaware and son of Joe Biden and Neilia Biden
- Naomi Christina Biden, (1971–1972): Daughter of Joe Biden and Neilia Biden
- Neilia Hunter Biden, (1942–1972): First wife of Joe Biden
- John McMahon, (1867–1954): professional baseball player for the Philadelphia Athletics and Baltimore Orioles
- Joseph Walsh, (1930–2014): Delaware Supreme Court Justice
- Margaret Gwenver, (1926–2010): Stage and Soap Opera Actress
- James Vincent Welding, Jr., (1947-2023): Liberty Mutual Insurance Hall of Fame and best friend of Joseph E. McGettigan III, Fran O'Hanlon, and Dom Irrera
