= Beau Biden =

American politician and lawyer (1969–2015)

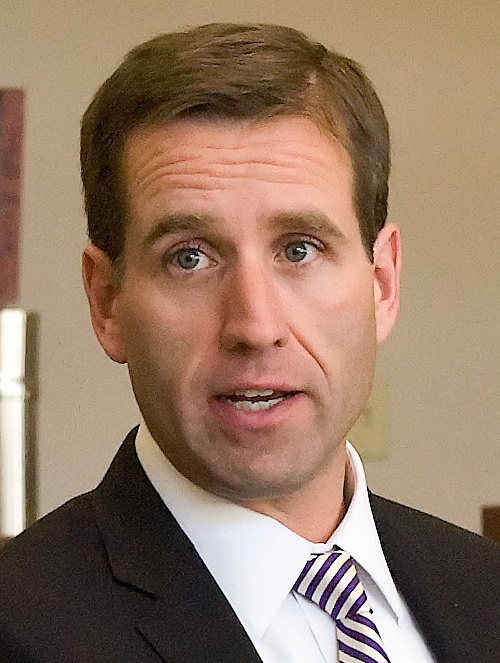
- Biden in 2012

44th Attorney General of Delaware
- In office January 2, 2007 – January 6, 2015
- Governor: Ruth Ann Minner; Jack Markell
- Preceded by: Carl Danberg
- Succeeded by: Matthew Denn

Personal details
- Born: Joseph Robinette Biden III; February 3, 1969 Wilmington, Delaware, U.S.
- Died: May 30, 2015 (aged 46) Bethesda, Maryland, U.S.
- Resting place: St. Joseph on the Brandywine
- Party: Democratic
- Spouse: Hallie Olivere (m. 2002)
- Children: 2
- Parents: Joe Biden; Neilia Hunter
- Relatives: Biden family
- Education: University of Pennsylvania (BA); Syracuse University (JD)

Military service
- Branch/service: Delaware Army National Guard
- Years of service: 2003–2015
- Rank: Major
- Unit: 261st Signal Brigade
- Battles/wars: Iraq War
- Awards: Legion of Merit (posthumous); Bronze Star Medal; Delaware Conspicuous Service Cross (posthumous)

Joseph Robinette "Beau" Biden III (February 3, 1969 – May 30, 2015) was an American politician, lawyer, and Army National Guard officer who served as the 44th attorney general of Delaware from 2007 to 2015. A member of the Biden family and the Democratic Party, he was the eldest child of 46th U.S. president Joe Biden and Neilia Hunter Biden.

After graduating from the University of Pennsylvania and Syracuse Law School, Biden joined the Delaware Army National Guard in 1995 and served as an officer in the Army Judge Advocate General's Corps, deploying to Iraq in 2008. He went on to work as a law clerk for a district judge before serving as a federal prosecutor until 2004. In 2006, Biden was elected Attorney General of Delaware. After his father's election as vice president in 2008, Biden considered running in the 2010 special election for his father's old U.S. Senate seat, but instead ran for re-election.

In April 2014, Biden announced his candidacy for the Democratic nomination for governor of Delaware in 2016. He died of glioblastoma, an aggressive form of brain cancer, in May 2015. His death generated national attention, and a portion of the 21st Century Cures Act was named the Beau Biden Cancer Moonshot initiative in his honor.

== Early life and family ==
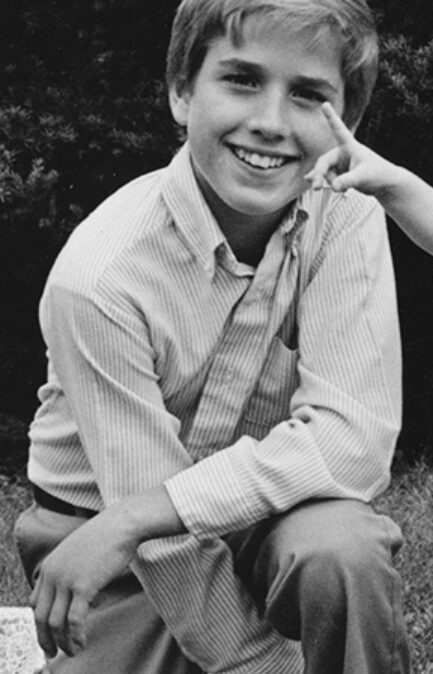
Biden as a child, c. 1980s

Joseph Robinette "Beau" Biden III was born in Wilmington, Delaware, on February 3, 1969, the eldest son of Joe Biden and his first wife Neilia. On December 18, 1972, his mother and infant sister Naomi were killed in an automobile accident while Christmas shopping. He was almost four years old and his brother, Hunter, was almost three years old. Beau and Hunter were in the car when the crash took place and were critically injured but survived. Beau sustained multiple broken bones while Hunter sustained injuries to his skull and severe traumatic brain damage. They spent several months in the hospital, where their father was sworn into the Senate two weeks after the accident.

According to some accounts, Beau and Hunter Biden encouraged their father to marry again, even going so far as to ask him "when were 'we' going to get married". In June 1977, his father married Jill Jacobs, whom Beau welcomed as a stepmother. His half-sister, Ashley, was born in 1981.

Biden married Hallie Olivere in 2002. They had two children: daughter Natalie Naomi (b. 2004), and son Robert Hunter II (b. 2006).

== Career ==
In 1987, Biden graduated from Archmere Academy, his father's high school alma mater, and the University of Pennsylvania in 1991, where he was a member of the Psi Upsilon fraternity. He was also a graduate of Syracuse University College of Law, as was his father. After graduating from law school, he clerked for Judge Steven McAuliffe of the United States District Court of New Hampshire. From 1995 to 2004, he worked at the United States Department of Justice in Philadelphia, first as Counsel to the Office of Policy Development and later as a federal prosecutor in the U.S. Attorney's Office.

Biden was in Kosovo after the 1998–1999 Kosovo War, working on behalf of the OSCE to train judges and prosecutors for the local judicial system. In 2004, he became a partner in the law firm of Bifferato, Gentilotti, Biden & Balick, where he worked for two years before being elected Attorney General of Delaware.

When Joe Biden was nominated for vice president at the 2008 Democratic National Convention, Beau Biden introduced him. Many delegates wept at his speech, which recounted the auto accident that killed his mother and sister and the subsequent commitment his father made to his sons.

== Military service ==
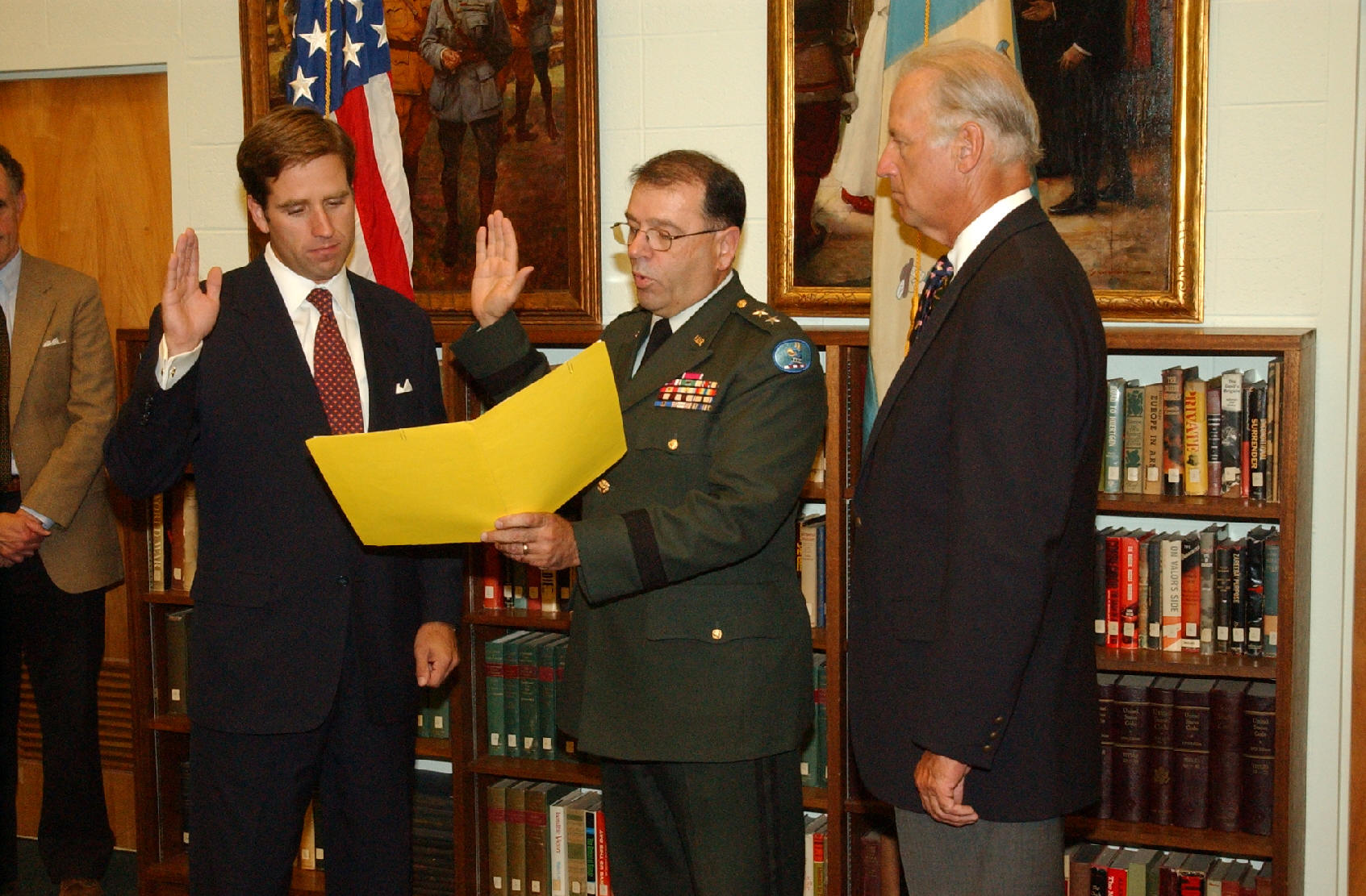
General Francis D. Vavala administers the oath of office to Beau Biden alongside his father in 2004.

Biden joined the Delaware Army National Guard in 2003 and attended The JAG School at the University of Virginia. He attained the rank of major in the Judge Advocate General's Corps as part of the 261st Signal Brigade in Smyrna, Delaware.

Biden's unit was activated to deploy to Iraq on October 3, 2008, and was sent to Fort Bliss, Texas for pre-deployment training. This was the day after his father participated in the 2008 presidential campaign's only vice presidential debate. His father was on the record as saying, "I don't want him going. But I tell you what, I don't want my grandson or my granddaughters going back in 15 years, and so how we leave makes a big difference."

Biden traveled to Washington, D.C. from Iraq in January 2009 for the presidential inauguration and his father's swearing-in as vice president, then returned to Iraq. Biden received a visit at Camp Victory from his father on July 4, 2009.

Biden returned from Iraq in September 2009 after completing his yearlong stint on active duty which included a 7-month deployment in the combat zone with the Judge Advocate General (JAG) Corps. During his deployment he announced that he would continue to actively serve as Delaware's attorney general by working in conjunction with his office's senior staff in Delaware, although a member of his unit related that Biden said he had turned over most of his attorney general work to his chief deputy in order to focus on his duties in Iraq.

Biden was awarded the Bronze Star Medal for meritorious service in Iraq. Army Chief of Staff Raymond Odierno delivered the eulogy at Biden's funeral and presented a posthumous Legion of Merit for his service in the Delaware National Guard, stating "Beau Biden possessed the traits I have witnessed in only the greatest leaders." He was also posthumously presented with the Delaware Conspicuous Service Cross, which is "awarded for heroism, meritorious service and outstanding achievement".

== Political career ==
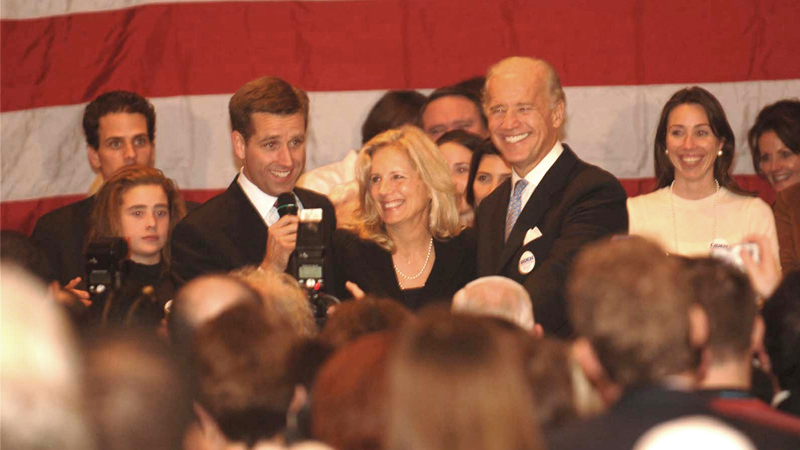
Biden giving his victory speech after being elected Attorney General of Delaware in 2006, as his father and step-mother look on

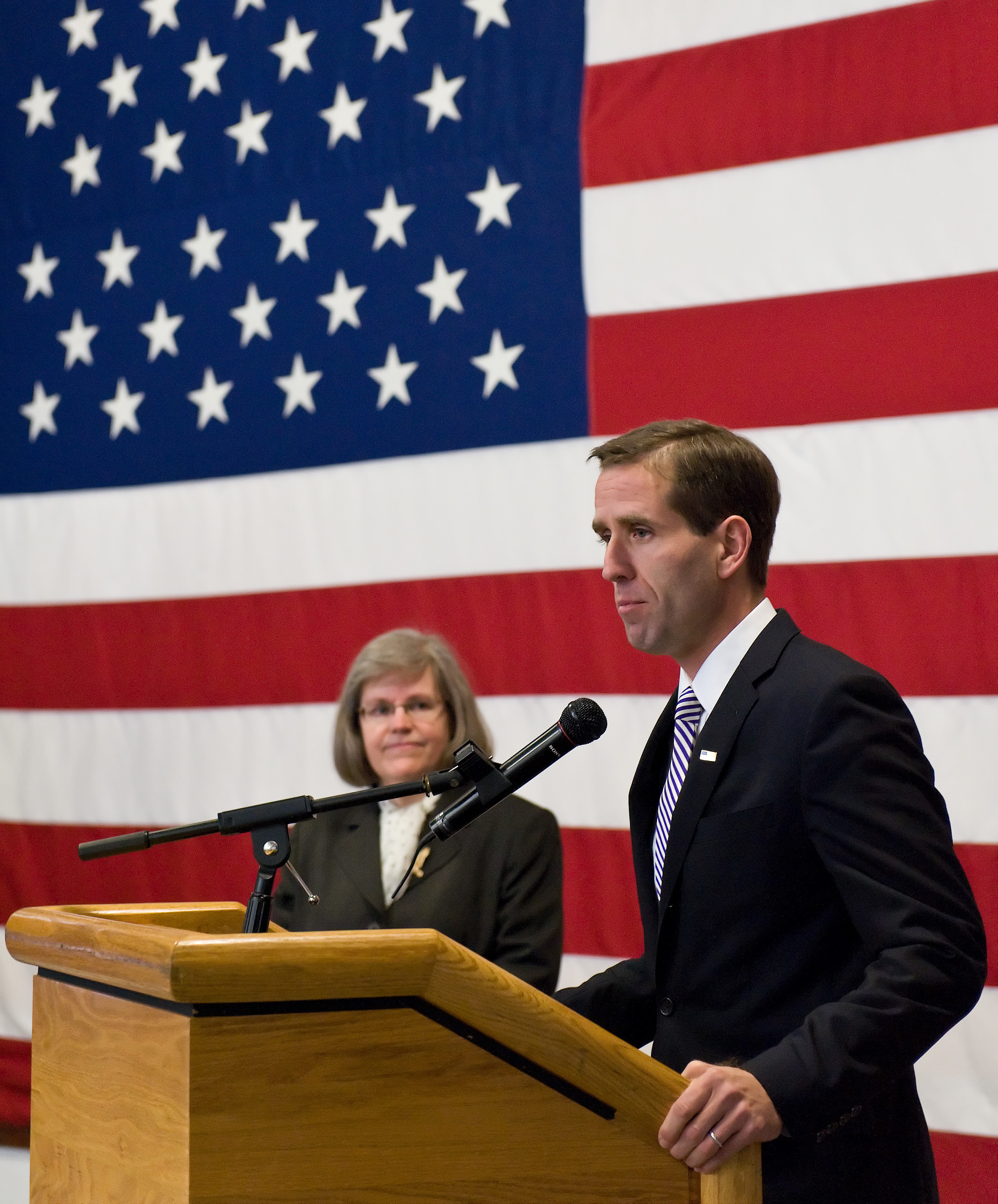
Biden and Holly Petraeus in 2012

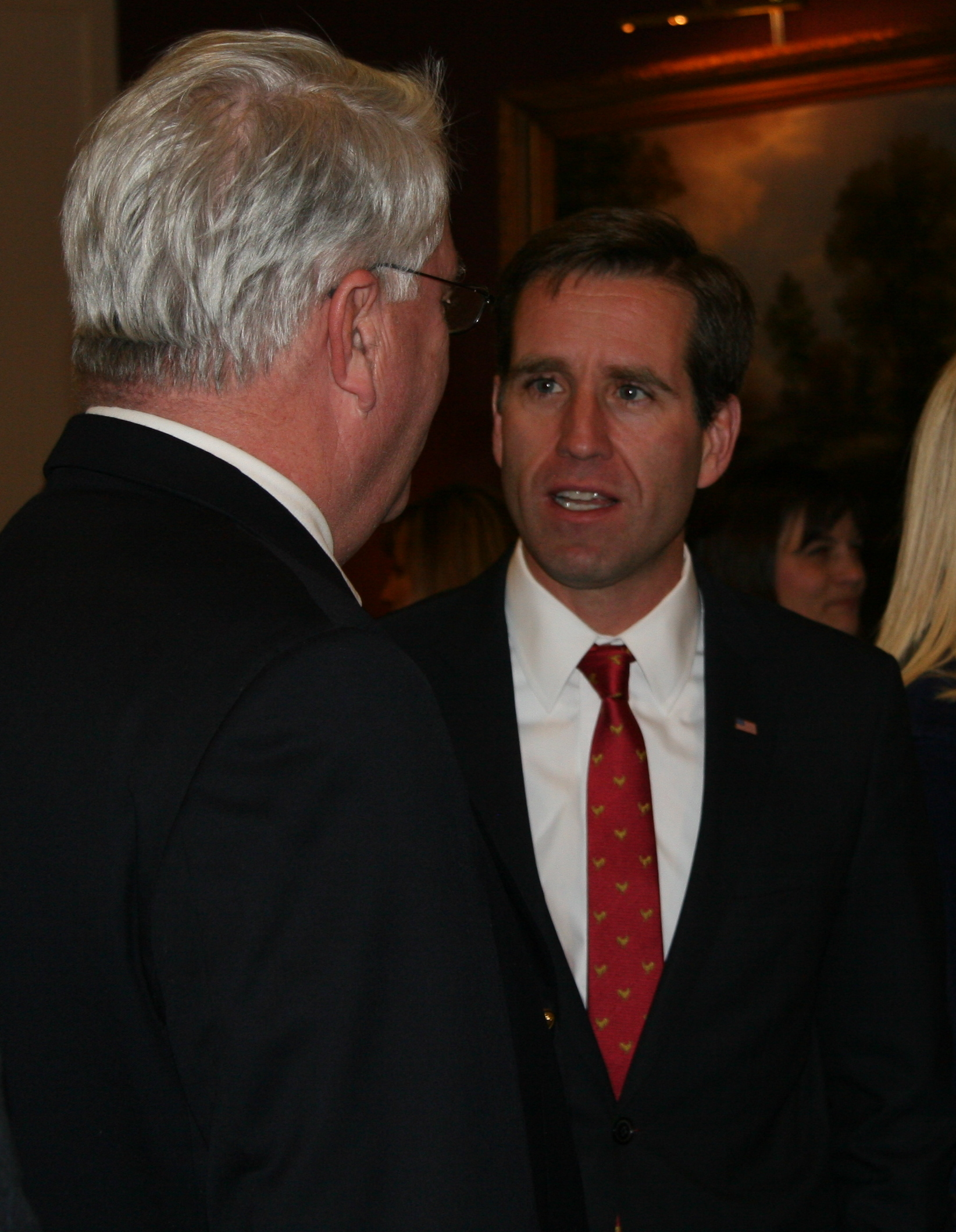
Biden with Delaware's Secretary of Agriculture Ed Kee in 2013

In his first bid for political office, Biden ran for attorney general of Delaware in 2006. Biden's opponent was a veteran state prosecutor and assistant U.S. attorney, Ferris Wharton. Major issues in the campaign included the candidates' experience and proposed efforts to address sex offenders, internet predators, senior abuse and domestic abuse. Biden won the election by approximately five percentage points.

After being elected, he appointed former Delaware Attorney General and International Judge Richard S. Gebelein as Chief Deputy Attorney General, and former assistant U.S. Attorney Richard G. Andrews was appointed as State Prosecutor. As Attorney General, Biden supported and enforced stronger registration requirements for sex offenders.

Joe Biden resigned from the Senate following his 2008 election to the vice presidency. Governor Ruth Ann Minner named former Joe Biden aide Ted Kaufman to fill the vacant seat, but Kaufman made it clear that he would not be a candidate in the 2010 special election. It fueled speculation Beau would run at that time. Biden's father stated after the announcement of Kaufman's appointment, "It is no secret that I believe my son, Attorney General, would make a great United States Senator just as I believe he has been a great attorney general. But Beau has made it clear from the moment he entered public life that any office he sought he would earn on his own.... [I]f he chooses to run for the Senate in the future, he will have to run and win on his own. He wouldn't have it any other way."

In October 2009, Biden stated that he was considering a run for the Senate and that he would make a final decision in January. On January 25, Biden confirmed that he would forgo a Senate run so as to better focus on the prosecution of Earl Bradley, a convicted serial child rapist.

On November 2, 2010, he was easily re-elected to a second term as Delaware Attorney General, beating Independent Party of Delaware candidate Doug Campbell by a large margin.

Biden was criticized for his handling of the prosecution of Robert H. Richards IV, an heir of the powerful Delaware-based Du Pont family accused of sexually assaulting his young daughter. In 2008, Biden's office charged Richards with two counts of second-degree rape, charges punishable by a minimum of 20 years in prison, but later that year, his office entered a plea bargain with Richards in which Richards pleaded guilty to one count of fourth-degree rape and was sentenced by Judge Jan Jurden to eight years' probation. Defending the plea bargain and Jurden's sentencing in a letter to The News Journal, Biden wrote "This was not a strong case, and a loss at trial was a distinct possibility" and said the judge "exercised sound discretion".

Biden did not seek election to a third term as attorney general in 2014. In the spring of that year, he announced his intention to run for governor of Delaware in the 2016 election to succeed term-limited Democratic Governor Jack Markell. At the time of this announcement, the cancer that would kill Biden in 2015 had been diagnosed (in 2013), but was in remission.

2006 Delaware Attorney General election
Party	Candidate	Votes	%
Democratic	Beau Biden	133,152	52.5%
Republican	Ferris Wharton	120,062	47.4%
Total votes		253,214	100.00%

2010 Delaware Attorney General election
Party	Candidate	Votes	%
Democratic	Beau Biden	196,799	78.9%
Independent Party	Doug Campbell	52,517	21.1%
Write-in		197	0.08%
Total votes		249,513	100.00%

== Illness and death ==
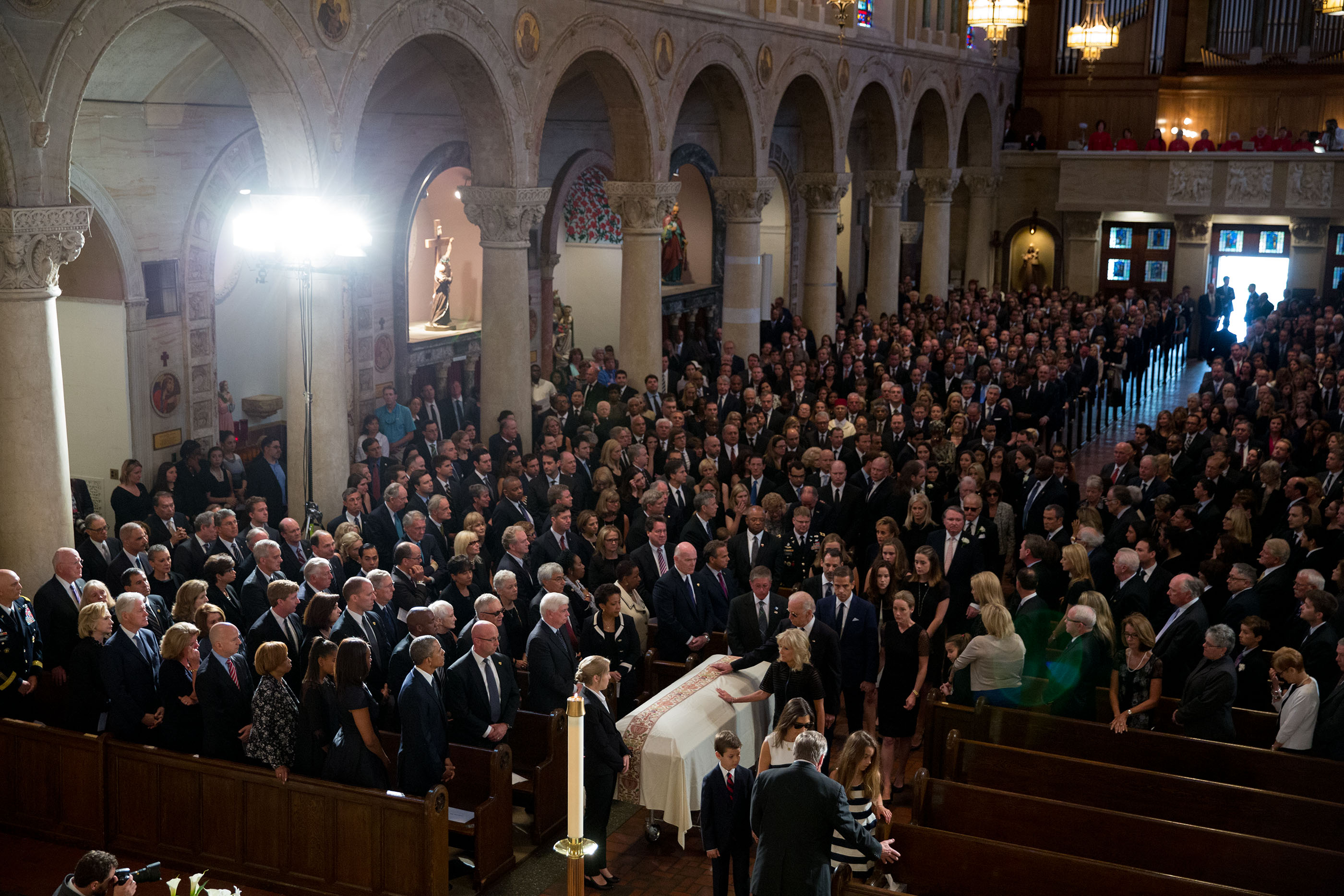
Biden's funeral Mass at St. Anthony of Padua Roman Catholic Church in Wilmington, Delaware

According to his father, Biden was diagnosed with ankylosing spondylitis in 2001 after returning from service in Kosovo. He was later diagnosed with brain cancer, which his father, without evidence, suggested was possibly a consequence of exposure to military burn pits in Iraq.

For the final few years of his life, Biden suffered from a brain tumor. In May 2010, he was admitted to Christiana Hospital in Newark, Delaware, after complaining of a headache, numbness, and paralysis. Officials stated that he had suffered a mild stroke. Later that month, Biden was transferred to Thomas Jefferson University Hospital in Philadelphia and kept for observation for several days.

In August 2013, Biden was admitted to the University of Texas MD Anderson Cancer Center in Houston and diagnosed with glioblastoma multiforme, the most aggressive type of primary brain cancer, after experiencing what White House officials called "an episode of disorientation and weakness". A lesion was removed at that time. Biden had radiation and chemotherapy treatments and the cancer remained stable. On May 20, 2015, he was admitted to Walter Reed National Military Medical Center in Bethesda, Maryland, because of a recurrence of brain cancer. He died there ten days later, on May 30, at the age of 46. His funeral was held at St. Anthony of Padua Roman Catholic Church in Wilmington, Delaware, on June 6.

External videos
- "Funeral Service for Beau Biden", C-SPAN

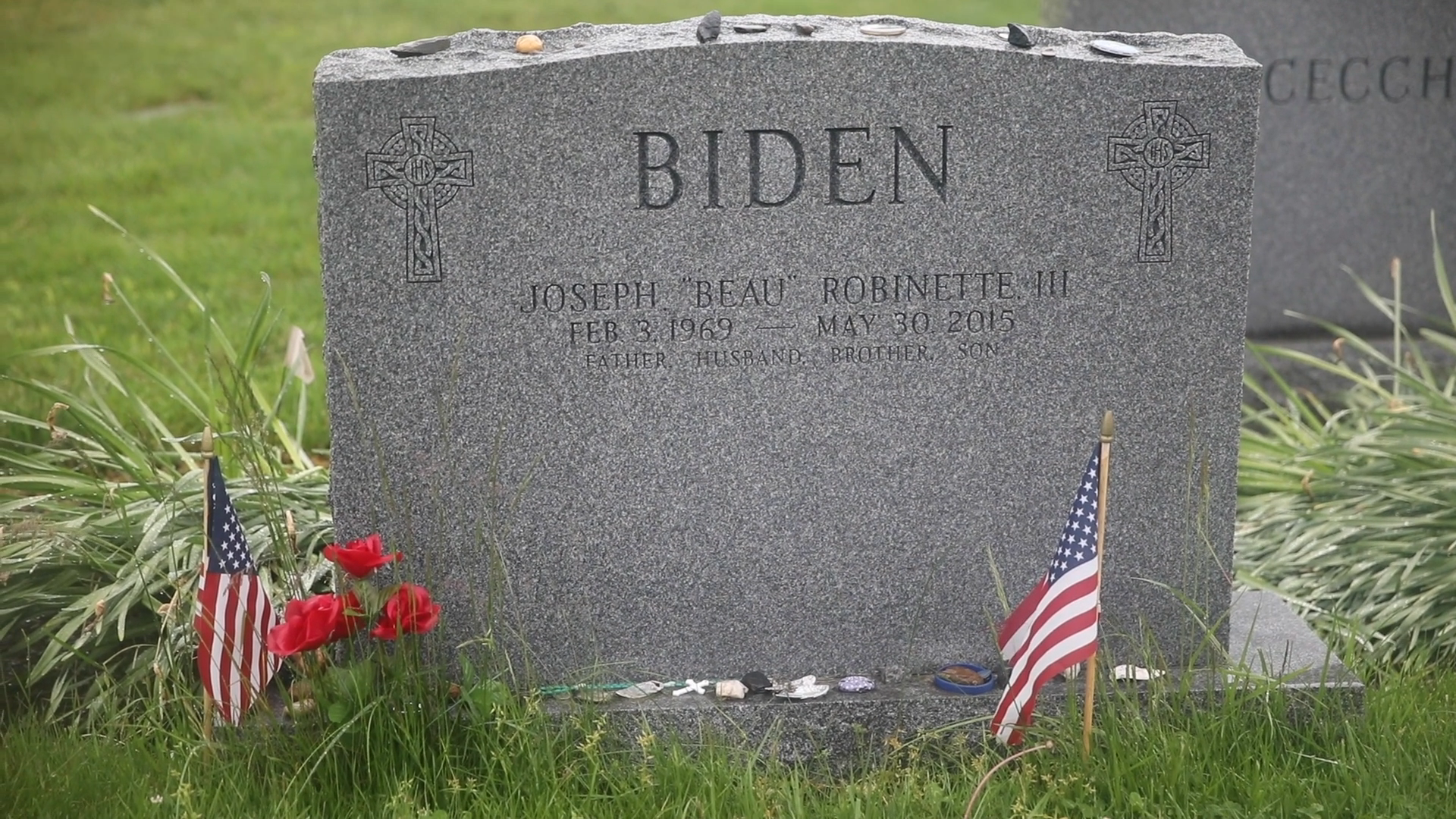
Biden's grave at St. Joseph on the Brandywine in Greenville, Delaware

Biden's funeral was attended by then-president Barack Obama, first lady Michelle Obama, their daughters Malia and Sasha, former president Bill Clinton, former secretary of state and former first lady Hillary Clinton, former US Army chief of staff general Ray Odierno, and then-Senate majority leader Mitch McConnell. At his funeral, he was awarded the Legion of Merit Award by General Odierno, for his services in the Iraq War. President Obama described Biden as "an original. He was a good man. He did in 46 years what most of us couldn't do in 146." At his funeral service, a solo rendition of the song "Til Kingdom Come" was performed by Chris Martin, the lead singer of the band Coldplay, of whom Beau had been a fan.

Biden was buried at St. Joseph on the Brandywine in Greenville, Delaware. His gravesite is near the graves of his grandparents Joe Sr. and Catherine, his mother Neilia and his sister Naomi.

== Posthumous awards and legacy ==
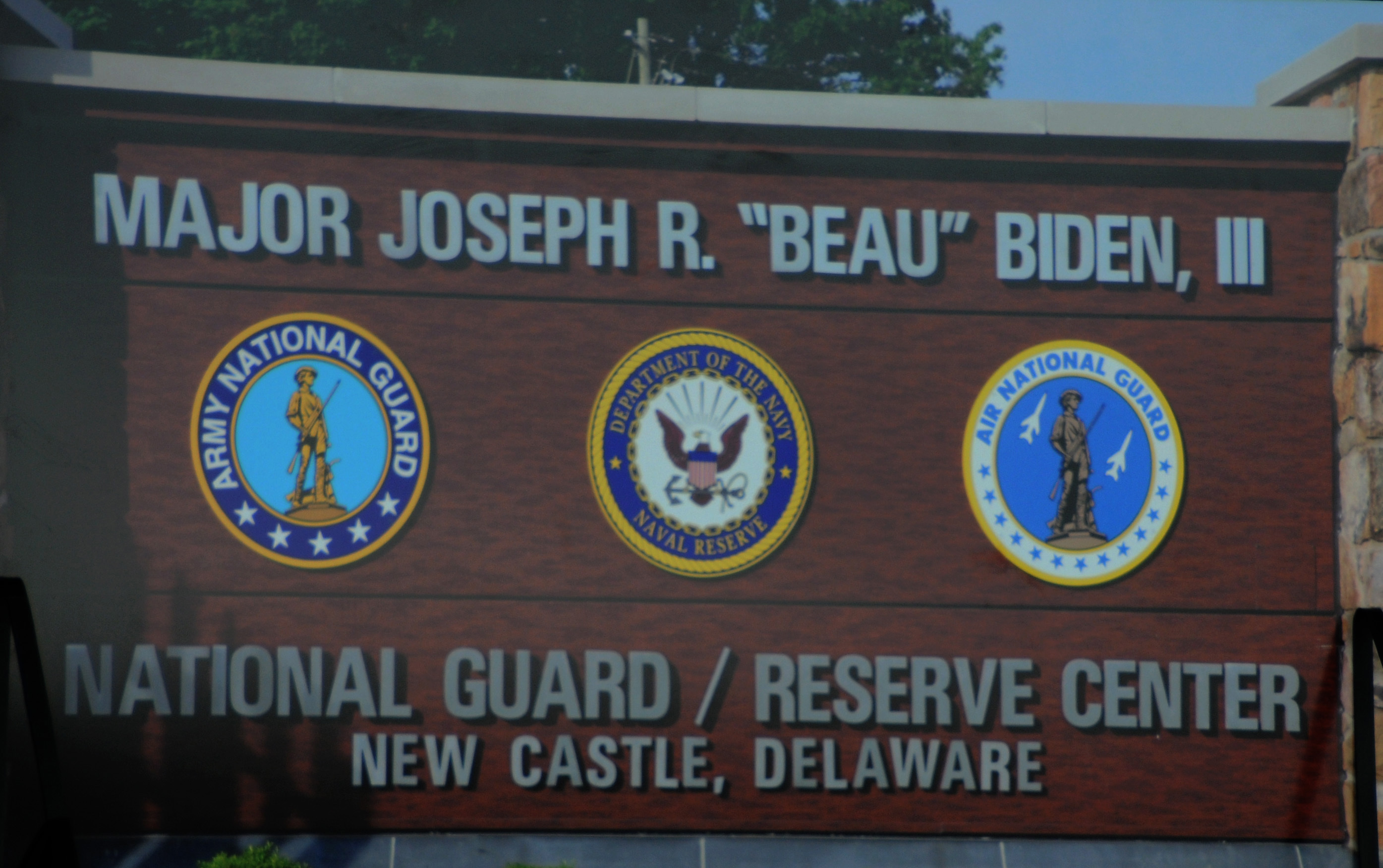
The Delaware National Guard joint headquarters building in New Castle, Delaware, which was renamed in Biden's honor after his death

On November 4, 2015, Biden was posthumously awarded the Albert Schweitzer Leadership Award, the highest honor given by the Hugh O'Brian Youth Leadership Foundation (HOBY), for his service to mankind. A portion of the 21st Century Cures Act (2016) was named the Beau Biden Cancer Moonshot initiative after him. A named scholarship was established at Syracuse University College of Law in 2016.

In August 2016, Joe Biden, his sister Valerie Biden Owens and son Hunter attended a ceremony in Kosovo that renamed a southeastern Kosovar highway "Joseph R. 'Beau' Biden, III" to honor Beau's contribution to Kosovo for training its judges and prosecutors. The Kosovar government posthumously awarded him the Presidential Medal on the Rule of Law in 2021.

On November 14, 2017, Joe Biden published a memoir titled Promise Me, Dad: A Year of Hope, Hardship, and Purpose, where he reflects on Beau Biden's illness and death.

On March 2, 2020, Joe Biden mentioned Beau in a speech, comparing him to former South Bend mayor Pete Buttigieg after Buttigieg endorsed Biden for the 2020 presidential election:

I don't think I've ever done this before, but [Buttigieg] reminds me of my son, Beau, and I know that may not mean much to most people, but to me, it's the highest compliment I can give any man or woman.

The Major Joseph R. "Beau" Biden III National Guard/Reserve Center in New Castle, Delaware, was named for Biden in 2016. It was the site of a speech by Joe Biden the day before his inauguration where he stated "we should be introducing him (Beau) as president".

Party political offices
Preceded by Carl Schnee	Democratic nominee for Attorney General of Delaware; 2006, 2010	Succeeded by Matthew Denn
Legal offices
Preceded by Carl Danberg	Attorney General of Delaware; 2007–2015	Succeeded by Matthew Denn
