= Neilia Hunter Biden =

First wife of President Joe Biden (1942–1972)

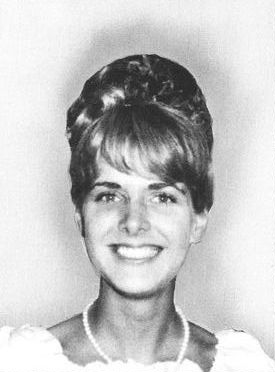
- Biden in 1966
- Born: Neilia Hunter; July 28, 1942; Skaneateles, New York, U.S.
- Died: December 18, 1972 (aged 30); Wilmington, Delaware, U.S.
- Cause of death: Traffic collision
- Burial place: St. Joseph on the Brandywine Cemetery, Greenville, Delaware, U.S.
- Education: Syracuse University (MA)
- Occupation: Teacher
- Spouse: Joe Biden (m. 1966)
- Children: 3, including Beau and Hunter

Neilia Hunter Biden (née Hunter; July 28, 1942 – December 18, 1972) was an American teacher. Biden was also the first wife of Joe Biden, who later became the 46th president of the United States. She died in a car crash with their one-year-old daughter, Naomi; their two sons, Beau and Hunter, were injured but survived the incident. Her death occurred six weeks after her husband's election to the U.S. Senate.

== Early life and career ==
Neilia Hunter was born on July 28, 1942, in Skaneateles, New York, to Louise (née Basel) and Robert Hunter, who were Presbyterians. Neilia had two brothers, John and Michael. She attended Penn Hall, a secondary boarding school in Chambersburg, Pennsylvania. She was active in the school's French club, field hockey, swimming and student council. After secondary school, she attended Syracuse University and was a school teacher in the Syracuse City School District. She was an English teacher at the Bellevue School in Syracuse, New York. She was a first cousin of former Auburn city councilman Robert Hunter.

== Personal life ==
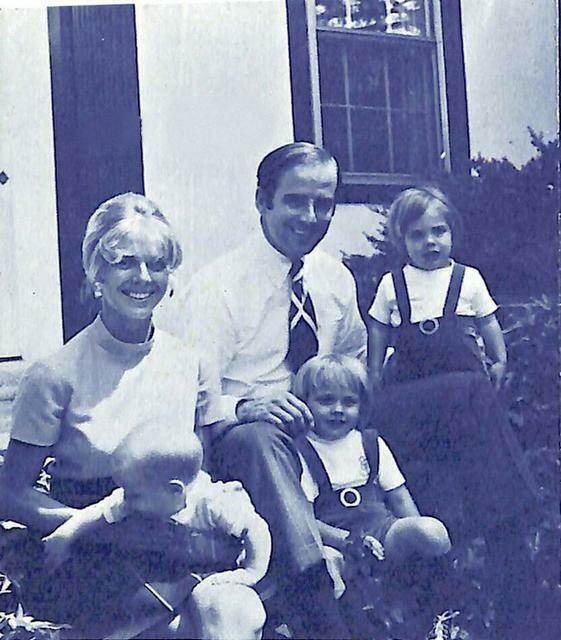
The Biden family c. 1972, (clockwise from top left): Neilia, Joe, Hunter, Beau, Naomi

Neilia Hunter met Joe Biden in Nassau, Bahamas. Shortly afterwards, Biden moved to Syracuse to be closer to her and attend law school. The couple married on August 27, 1966. After Biden graduated from law school, the couple moved to Wilmington, Delaware, where he was on the New Castle County Council. They had three children: Joseph Robinette "Beau" III, Robert Hunter and Naomi Christina ("Amy"). While Biden was campaigning to unseat U.S. Delaware senator J. Caleb Boggs, Neilia was described by The News Journal as the "brains" of his campaign.

== Death ==
On December 18, 1972, shortly after Joe became U.S. senator-elect, Neilia was driving with her three children west along rural Valley Road in Hockessin, Delaware. At the intersection with Delaware Route 7 (Limestone Road), their vehicle pulled out in front of a tractor-trailer truck traveling north along Route 7 and was struck by it. Police determined that Neilia had driven into the path of the tractor-trailer. The truck driver, identified as Curtis C. Dunn, aged 47, of Avondale, Pennsylvania, escaped without any major injury (he died in 1999). All four occupants of Biden’s vehicle were taken to Wilmington General Hospital, where Neilia and Naomi were pronounced dead on arrival. Three-year-old Beau and two-year-old Hunter were treated for non-life-threatening injuries, Beau with a broken leg and other wounds, and Hunter with a minor skull fracture and other head injuries. Two weeks after the crash, Joe was sworn into the Senate at the hospital where his two sons were being treated. Neilia and Naomi were buried in St. Joseph on the Brandywine Cemetery in Greenville, Delaware.

== Legacy ==
In a commencement speech at Yale University in 2015, Joe Biden, then serving as U.S. vice president under President Barack Obama, spoke of his wife. He said "The incredible bond I have with my children is the gift I'm not sure I would have had, had I not been through what I went through [after the fatal crash]. But by focusing on my sons, I found my redemption."

Dedicated in her memory, Neilia Hunter Biden Park is in a suburban area of unincorporated New Castle County, Delaware. Cayuga Community College in Auburn, New York, where Neilia's father ran the food service operation for many years, annually confers the Neilia Hunter Biden Award on two graduates—one is conferred for journalism and the other for English literature. Among the early winners was William "Bill" Fulton, who later served as mayor of Ventura, California. A memorial plaque was erected at Bellevue Elementary School in Syracuse in Neilia's memory.
