= Greenville, Delaware =

Census-designated place in Delaware, United States

- CDP
- Location of Greenville in New Castle County, Delaware (left) and of New Castle County in Delaware (right)

- Location of Greenville in Delaware Greenville (the United States)
- Coordinates: 39°46′44″N 75°35′54″W
- Country: United States
- State: Delaware
- County: New Castle

Area
  - Total: 2.81 sq mi (7.29 km^{2})
  - Land: 2.80 sq mi (7.24 km^{2})
  - Water: 0.019 sq mi (0.05 km^{2})
- Elevation: 256 ft (78 m)

Population (2020)
  - Total: 3,104
  - Density: 1,110.3/sq mi (428.69/km^{2})
- Time zone: UTC-5 (Eastern (EST))
  - Summer (DST): UTC-4 (EDT)
- ZIP codes: 19807, 19884
- Area code: 302
- FIPS code: 10-31430
- GNIS feature ID: 214034

Greenville is a bedroom community in New Castle County, Delaware, United States, and a suburb of Wilmington. As of the 2020 census, Greenville had a population of 3,104. For statistical purposes, the United States Census Bureau has defined Greenville as a census-designated place (CDP). The community is also home to the private residence of Joe Biden, the 46th president of the United States, and many Du Pont family descendants.

== Geography ==
According to the U.S. Census Bureau, Greenville has a total area of 2.74 square miles (7.1 km^{2}), of which 2.72 square miles (7.0 km^{2}) is land and 0.02 square miles (0.052 km^{2}) (0.73%) is water. The Census Bureau definition of the area may not precisely correspond to the local understanding of the community.

== Demographics ==
Historical population
Census	Pop.	Note	%±
2000	2,332		—
2010	2,326		−0.3%
2020	3,104		33.4%
U.S. Decennial Census

=== 2020 census ===
As of the 2020 census, Greenville had a population of 3,104. The median age was 49.1 years. 16.1% of residents were under the age of 18 and 25.8% of residents were 65 years of age or older. For every 100 females there were 100.4 males, and for every 100 females age 18 and over there were 105.8 males age 18 and over.

91.8% of residents lived in urban areas, while 8.2% lived in rural areas.

There were 1,504 households in Greenville, of which 19.6% had children under the age of 18 living in them. Of all households, 43.9% were married-couple households, 26.1% were households with a male householder and no spouse or partner present, and 24.9% were households with a female householder and no spouse or partner present. About 38.7% of all households were made up of individuals and 15.4% had someone living alone who was 65 years of age or older.

There were 1,617 housing units, of which 7.0% were vacant. The homeowner vacancy rate was 2.8% and the rental vacancy rate was 4.5%.

Racial composition as of the 2020 census
Race	Number	Percent
White	2,437	78.5%
Black or African American	104	3.4%
American Indian and Alaska Native	4	0.1%
Asian	367	11.8%
Native Hawaiian and Other Pacific Islander	0	0.0%
Some other race	46	1.5%
Two or more races	146	4.7%
Hispanic or Latino (of any race)	103	3.3%

=== 2010 census ===
At the 2010 census there were 2,326 people, 1,076 households, and 654 families living in the CDP. The population density was 849 inhabitants per square mile (328/km^{2}). There were 1,395 housing units at an average density of 509.1 per square mile (196.6/km^{2}). The racial makeup of the CDP was 85.7% White, 4.8% African American, 7.2% Asian, 0.9% from other races, and 1.3% from two or more races. Hispanic or Latino of any race were 3.4%.

Of the 1,076 households 24.3% had children under the age of 18 living with them, 53.3% were married couples living together, 5.9% had a female householder with no spouse or partner present, 1.7% had a male householder with no spouse or partner present, and 39.2% were non-families. 34.5% of households were one person and 12.6% were one person aged 65 or older. The average household size was 2.16 and the average family size was 2.79.

The age distribution was 21.1% under the age of 18, 3.7% from 18 to 24, 22.5% from 25 to 44, 28.8% from 45 to 64, and 24.0% 65 or older. The median age was 46.6 years. For every 100 females age 18 and over, there were 89.6 males.

=== Income and poverty ===
According to the American Community Survey, the median household income was in the CDP is $133,864, and the median family income is $159,632. The per capita income for the CDP was $109,521. None of the families and 2.5% of the population are living below the poverty line.

Greenville and Henlopen Acres are the two richest places in Delaware, all but tied for highest personal incomes, averaging over $80,000 per annum.

== Education ==
Greenville is situated in the Red Clay Consolidated School District.

Its zoned schools are Brandywine Springs Elementary School, Alexis I. duPont Middle School, and Alexis I. duPont High School. DuPoint High is in Greenville.

Previously Greenville was in the Alexis I. DuPont School District.

The Alexis I. DuPont Special School District was created on April 14, 1919 by an action of the Delaware General Assembly. It was reorganized on July 1, 1969 as the Alexis I. DuPont School District. The Alexis I. DuPont district merged into the New Castle County School District in 1978. That district was divided into four districts, among them the Red Clay district, in 1981.

== Points of interest ==
- Alexis I. duPont High School
- Holladay-Harrington House
- St. Joseph's on the Brandywine
- Stockton-Montmorency
- Wilmington Country Club
- Winterthur Museum, Garden and Library

Outside of the CDP but nearby

- John Carney Agricultural Complex
- Hagley Museum and Library
- Mt. Cuba Center
- Walnut Green School

== Notable people ==
- Harry Anderson professional baseball player
- Jill Biden, First Lady of the United States (2021–2025), Second Lady of the United States (2009-2017)
- Joe Biden, 46th President of the United States (2021–2025), 47th Vice President of the United States (2009-2017)
- Hallie Olivere Biden, daughter-in-law of Joe Biden
- Alfred I. du Pont, businessman and philanthropist
- Eleuthère Irénée du Pont, chemist and founder of the company which eventually became DuPont
- Francis Irénée du Pont, industrialist
- Henry A. du Pont, Medal of Honor recipient and Republican United States Senator
- Lammot du Pont Copeland, president of DuPont
- Pierre Samuel du Pont de Nemours, French-American writer, economist, and politician
- Pierre S. du Pont, IV, Republican governor and congressman
- T. Coleman du Pont, president of DuPont and Republican United States Senator
- Ted Kaufman, Democratic United States Senator
- Jim Thompson, businessman and U.S. military intelligence officer, disappeared under mysterious circumstances
- Herman E. Schroeder, DuPont researcher
- Johnny Weir, figure skater
