= 1972 United States Senate election in Delaware =

- November 7, 1972
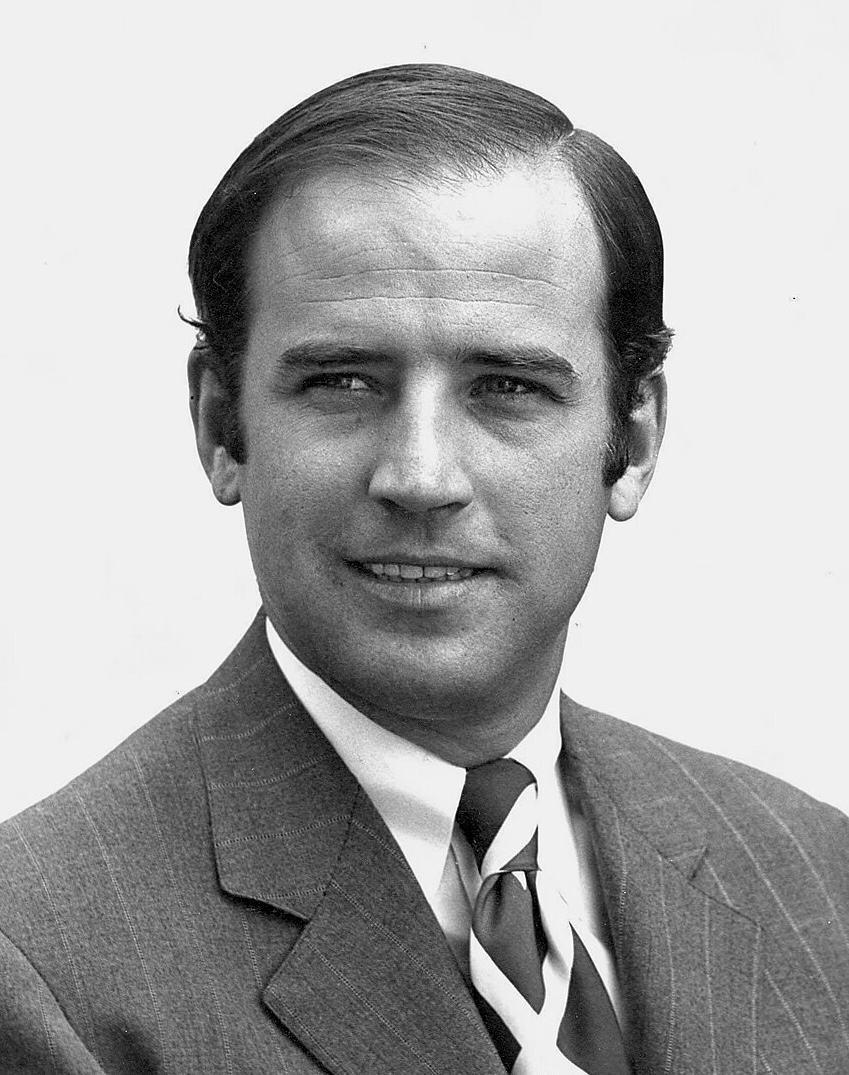

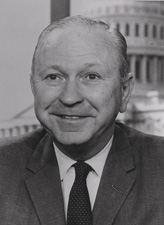
Nominee	Joe Biden	J. Caleb Boggs
Party	Democratic	Republican
Popular vote	116,006	112,844
Percentage	50.48%	49.10%
- Biden: 40–50% 50–60% 60–70% 70–80% Boggs: 40–50% 50–60% 60–70%
U.S. senator before election
J. Caleb Boggs
Republican
Elected U.S. Senator
Joe Biden
Democratic

The 1972 United States Senate election in Delaware was held November 7, 1972. Incumbent Republican Senator J. Caleb Boggs ran for a third term in the United States Senate. Boggs faced off against Democrat Joe Biden, a New Castle County councilman. Though Boggs was expected to easily win a third term, Biden narrowly defeated the incumbent on election day, even while fellow Democrat George McGovern lost Delaware by 20.4% in the concurrent presidential election. Biden's victory margin of 3,162 votes made this the closest U.S. Senate election of the year.

Biden won a total of seven terms in the Senate, before being elected vice president in 2008 and in 2012, and president in 2020. He has never been defeated in an election during his political career. At the age of 29, Biden became the youngest person to be elected senator since Rush Holt won in West Virginia in 1934. Delaware was one of fifteen states that were won by Richard Nixon that elected Democrats to the United States Senate.

== Primary and candidates ==
- Joe Biden (Democrat), New Castle County Council member
- J. Caleb Boggs (Republican), incumbent senator and former governor of Delaware
- Henry M. Majka (American)
- Herbert B. Wood (Prohibition)

Longtime Delaware political figure and incumbent Republican Senator J. Caleb Boggs was considering retirement, which would likely have left U.S. Representative Pete du Pont and Wilmington Mayor Hal Haskell in a divisive Senate primary. To avoid a potential primary, President Richard Nixon helped convince Boggs to run again with full party support.

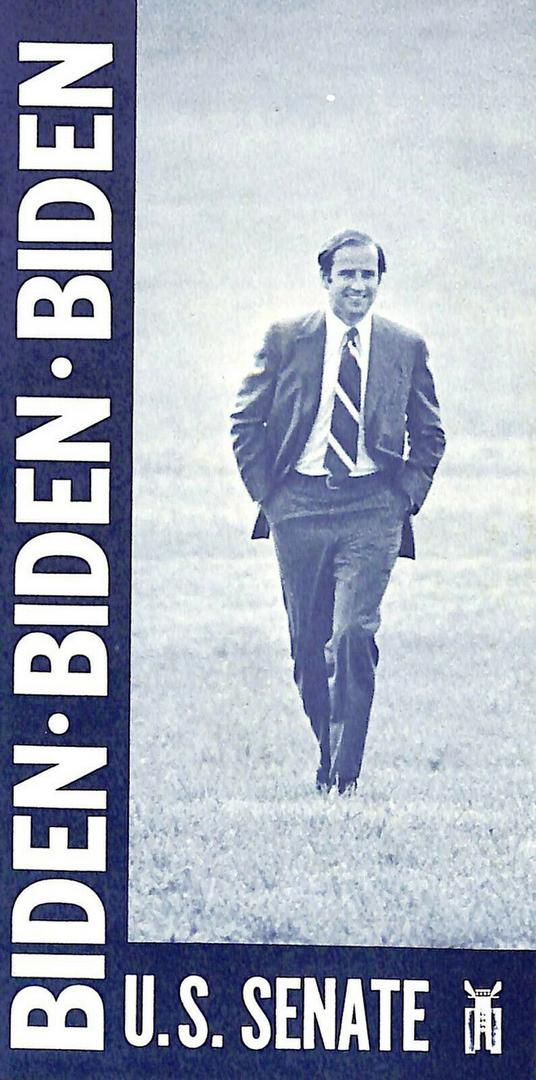
Biden campaign pamphlet

Aside from Biden, a New Castle County Councilman, no Democrat wanted to challenge Boggs.

== General election ==
=== Campaign ===
Biden's campaign had virtually no money and was given little to no chance of winning. The campaign was managed by Biden's sister, Valerie Biden Owens (who managed his future campaigns), was staffed by other members of the Biden family, and relied upon handed-out newsprint position papers.

Biden did receive some assistance from the AFL–CIO and from Democratic pollster Patrick Caddell. His campaign focused on withdrawal from the Vietnam War, the environment, civil rights, mass transit, more equitable taxation, health care, the public's dissatisfaction with politics-as-usual, and "change". Biden also opposed giving amnesty to draft dodgers. Despite not supporting the legalization of marijuana, he said in a campaign ad: "the possession of marijuana is a misdemeanor—a minor offense. The police should treat it that way, and devote the greater part of their efforts to heroin."

During the summer, Biden trailed Boggs by almost 30 percentage points; however, his energy level, attractive young family, and ability to connect with voters' emotions gave him an advantage over the ready-to-retire Boggs. John Marttila served as one of his consultants and had previously worked for Robert Drinan's campaign for the U.S. House of Representatives. Biden's campaign was described as having "no money to speak of" and relied on position papers in newspapers and a few campaign advertisements on the radio. One notable advertisement used by the Biden campaign was a brochure printed in newspaper format that contrasted the world view of the two candidates, e.g. (full page) "To Cale Boggs an unfair tax was the 1948 poll tax"; (opposite page) "To Joe Biden an unfair tax is the 1972 income tax." On November 7, 1972, Biden upset Boggs by a margin of 3,162 votes.

Biden varied his messaging during campaign events throughout the state as well. For example, in the southern parts of the state his pitch was: "thirty years ago, caring for the environment meant picking up bottles and beer cans on Rehoboth Beach ... and now it means saving the beach." In the northern parts of the state in the Wilmington area it was "in 1950, Cale Boggs promised to keep highways growing; in 1970 Joe Biden promises to keep trees growing."

The 2004 Frank Sheeran biography I Heard You Paint Houses, alleged that in the week prior to Election Day, an unidentified lawyer approached Sheeran about preventing the distribution of the local paper because Boggs was running an advertisement unflattering to Biden. Sheeran claimed that he organized a work stoppage, and that Teamsters truck drivers refused to cross a picket line, so the papers were not delivered. While the credibility of Sheeran's account has been called into question, The New York Times did report a work stoppage preventing the delivery of the Friday edition of The Morning News.

=== Results ===
Despite trailing, on Election Day, Biden defeated Boggs in an upset. There were two other candidates in the 1972 Senate election: Henry M. Majka and Herbert B. Wood. Majka came from the American Party while Wood hailed from the Prohibition Party. Majka managed to receive 803 votes, or 0.3% of the vote, while Wood got 175 votes, or 0.1% of the vote.

1972 United States Senate election in Delaware
Party	Candidate	Votes	%	±%
Democratic	Joe Biden	116,006	50.48%	+9.59%
Republican	J. Caleb Boggs (incumbent)	112,844	49.10%	−10.02%
American	Henry M. Majka	803	0.35%	N/A
Prohibition	Herbert B. Wood	175	0.07%	N/A
Total votes		229,828	100.00%	N/A
Democratic gain from Republican				

==== Results by subdivision ====
Biden successfully flipped both New Castle County and Kent County away from the Republican Party. This is the only time that Biden has lost Sussex County in his seven elections to the Senate. This would be the last time that Republicans won any counties for this seat until 2002, when Biden still comfortably won re-election.

County	Joe Biden Democratic		J. Caleb Boggs Republican		Henry M. Majka American		Herbert B. Wood Prohibition		Total votes cast	Ref.
County	#	%	#	%	#	%	#	%	#	Ref.
Kent	14,598	52.36%	13,121	47.06%	140	0.5%	21	0.08%	27,880	
New Castle	85,017	50.32%	83,273	49.29%	532	0.31%	133	0.08%	168,955	
Sussex	16,391	49.68%	16,450	49.86%	131	0.4%	21	0.06%	32,993	
Totals	116,006	50.48%	112,844	49.10%	803	0.35%	175	0.07%	229,828	

District	Joe Biden Democratic	J. Caleb Boggs Republican	Henry M. Majka American	Herbert B. Wood Prohibition	Total votes cast	Ref.
District 1	3,398	3,481	17	10	6,906	=
District 2	2,044	1,052	12	4	3,112	=
District 3	1,804	1,039	6	2	2,851	=
District 4	2,112	1,129	4	4	3,249	=
District 5	3,549	1,357	18	2	4,926	=
District 6	3,200	3,798	17	9	7,024	=
District 7	2,836	3,772	25	13	6,646	=
District 8	2,943	2,911	31	6	5,891	=
District 9	2,735	2,781	26	7	5,549	=
District 10	2,835	4,325	11	0	7,171	=
District 11	2,980	5,280	21	9	8,290	=
District 12	2,696	4,394	19	4	7,113	=
District 13	2,420	5,010	29	8	7,467	=
District 14	3,423	3,589	16	3	7,031	=
District 15	3,826	2,072	13	0	5,911	=
District 16	3,127	2,816	20	7	5,970	=
District 17	2,620	1,662	20	4	4,306	=
District 18	2,580	1,532	19	5	4,136	=
District 19	3,295	2,703	11	5	6,014	=
District 20	3,224	2,209	28	2	5,463	=
District 21	3,012	2,481	13	3	5,509	=
District 22	3,248	3,381	23	4	6,656	=
District 23	3,141	3,108	20	5	6,274	=
District 24	3,339	2,885	20	2	6,246	=
District 25	3,369	3,347	11	2	6,729	=
District 26	2,202	1,927	17	2	4,148	=
District 27	3,430	4,066	27	5	7,528	=
District 28	2,575	2,562	24	3	5,164	=
District 29	3,054	2,604	14	3	5,675	=
District 30	2,794	2,482	32	2	5,310	=
District 31	2,633	2,642	32	3	5,310	=
District 32	2,534	2,792	16	2	5,344	=
District 33	2,507	2,074	26	5	4,612	=
District 34	1,141	1,037	9	1	2,188	=
District 35	2,989	2,094	25	8	5,116	=
District 36	2,965	2,537	43	9	5,554	=
District 37	2,882	3,853	20	3	6,758	=
District 38	2,598	2,432	22	2	5,054	=
District 39	2,746	2,711	21	3	5,481	=
District 40	2,617	2,436	11	2	5,066	=
District 41	2,583	2,481	14	2	5,080	=
Total	116,006	112,844	803	175	229,828	=

== Aftermath ==
A few weeks later, on December 18, 1972, Biden's wife and daughter died in a car crash which injured his sons. Biden contemplated resigning the Senate seat, and told his brother to talk with governor-elect Sherman W. Tribbitt about his successor. Senate Majority Leader Mike Mansfield persuaded Biden to stay in the Senate for at least six months. Biden was sworn in at the hospital where his sons were recovering. Biden held the seat until his election as vice president 36 years later.

At the time of the 1972 election, Biden was 29 years old. He turned 30—the minimum age for a U.S. senator—on November 20, 1972, in time for the Senate term beginning January 3, 1973. At the commencement of his Senate term, Biden was the sixth-youngest U.S. senator in history.
