= US Senate career of Joe Biden =

Career of Joe Biden in the United States Senate

Joe Biden
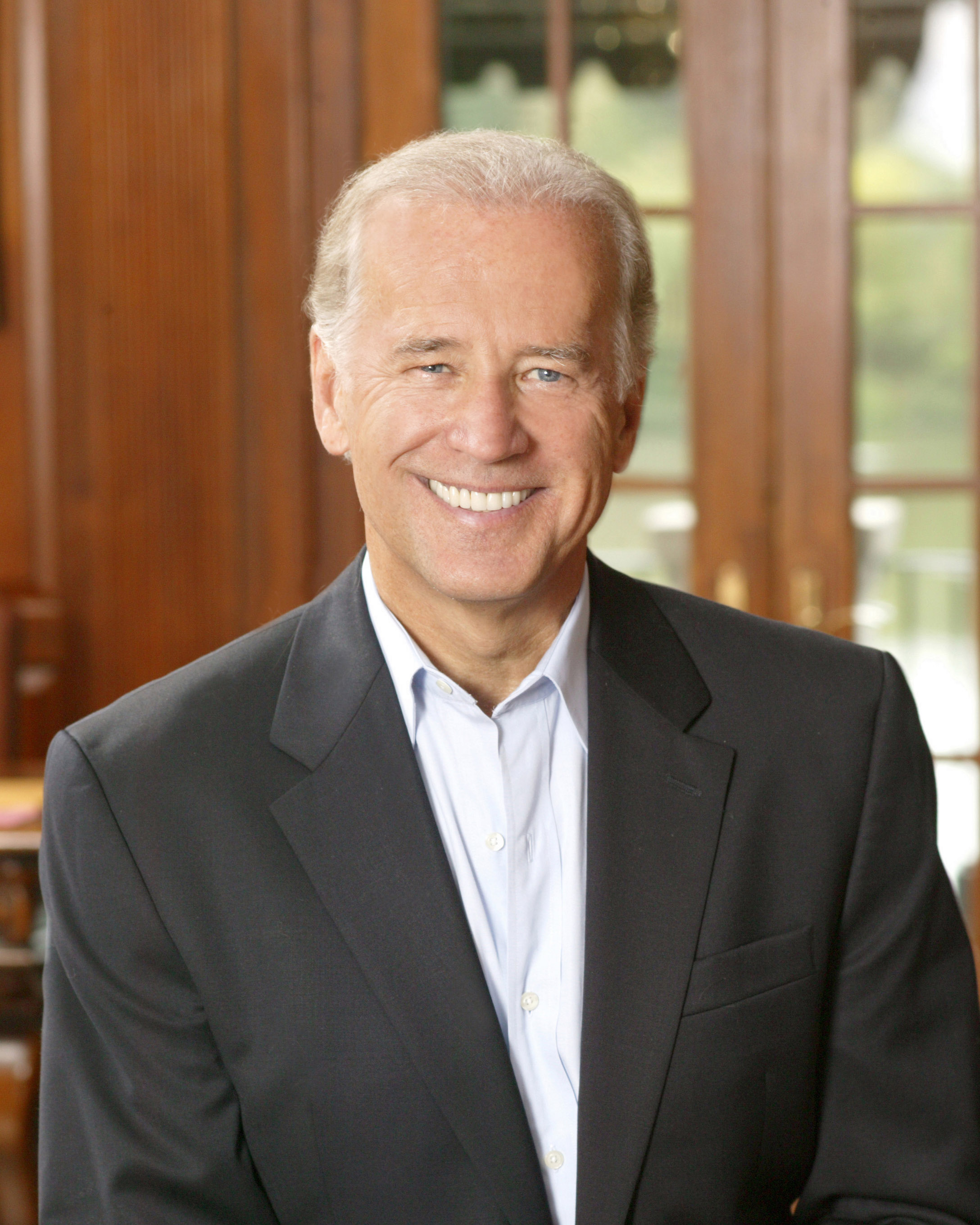
- Biden in 2005, during the 109th Congress

President of the United States Senate
- In office January 20, 2009 – January 20, 2017
- President pro tem: Robert Byrd; Daniel Inouye; Patrick Leahy; Orrin Hatch
- Preceded by: Dick Cheney
- Succeeded by: Mike Pence

United States Senator from Delaware
- In office January 5, 1973 – January 15, 2009
- Preceded by: J. Caleb Boggs
- Succeeded by: Ted Kaufman

Chair of the Senate Foreign Relations Committee
- In office January 3, 2007 – January 3, 2009
- Preceded by: Richard Lugar
- Succeeded by: John Kerry
- In office June 6, 2001 – January 3, 2003
- Preceded by: Jesse Helms
- Succeeded by: Richard Lugar
- In office January 3, 2001 – January 20, 2001
- Preceded by: Jesse Helms
- Succeeded by: Jesse Helms

Chair of the International Narcotics Control Caucus
- In office January 3, 2007 – January 3, 2009
- Preceded by: Chuck Grassley
- Succeeded by: Dianne Feinstein

Chair of the Senate Judiciary Committee
- In office January 3, 1987 – January 3, 1995
- Preceded by: Strom Thurmond
- Succeeded by: Orrin Hatch

Joe Biden served as a United States senator representing Delaware from January 3, 1973, to January 15, 2009, then served as vice president of the United States from January 20, 2009 to January 20, 2017. A member of the Democratic Party, Biden was narrowly elected to the Senate in 1972 and won re-election six other times; having served for 36 years, he remains Delaware's longest-serving U.S. senator. As a senator, Biden drafted and led the effort to pass the Violent Crime Control and Law Enforcement Act and the Violence Against Women Act. He also oversaw six U.S. Supreme Court confirmation hearings, including the contentious hearings for Robert Bork and Clarence Thomas. He resigned from his seat to serve as Vice President of the United States under President Barack Obama from 2009 to 2017; making him Senate President.

As a county councilor, Biden ran against incumbent Republican J. Caleb Boggs in 1972, after facing no Democratic rivals. He ran under a small-scale family-run campaign, but his energy and voter connectivity appealed to the public. After Biden was elected, his wife and infant daughter died in a car accident. Biden was persuaded not to resign and commuted to Delaware throughout his Senate career to care for his two sons, Beau and Hunter, both of whom had survived the crash. He married Jill Tracy Jacobs in 1977; their daughter Ashley was born in 1981.

During his early years in the Senate, Biden focused on consumer protection and the environment. He played a key role in passing the Comprehensive Crime Control Act of 1984, which was controversial for several "tough-on-crime" provisions. He later expressed regret over this. Biden voted to ban homosexuals from serving in the military and to bar the federal government from recognizing same-sex marriages. He championed arms control concerning the SALT treaties. He clashed with the Reagan administration over its support for apartheid-era South Africa. He was a leading opponent of mandatory desegregation busing. In 1987, Biden ran for president, but withdrew due to incidents of plagiarism coming to light. The following year, Biden received brain surgery after suffering aneurysms.

As chairman of the Senate Judiciary Committee, Biden presided over the contentious Supreme Court nominations of Robert Bork and Clarence Thomas. Biden voiced opposition to Bork's originalism. During the Thomas hearings, Biden's style was criticized and Thomas felt his questions were meant to damage him. Biden disclosed Anita Hill's allegations of sexual harassment to the rest of the committee, but not the public. Later he refused other witnesses to be heard. Biden also opposed his confirmation. Later he expressed regret to Hill. He spearheaded the Violent Crime Control and Law Enforcement Act of 1994. Biden was critical of the actions of Independent Counsel Kenneth Starr during the 1990s Whitewater controversy and Clinton–Lewinsky scandal investigations and voted to acquit on both charges during the impeachment of Bill Clinton.

Concerning foreign policy, Biden was generally a liberal internationalist, collaborating with Republicans and sometimes opposing fellow Democrats. He voted against authorizing the Gulf War, saying the US was bearing almost all the burden in the anti-Iraq coalition. He was strongly involved with policy towards the Yugoslav Wars. He supported the wars in Afghanistan and Iraq. As chairman of the Senate Foreign Relations Committee he assembled witnesses who grossly misrepresented Saddam Hussein, his government and claimed possession of weapons of mass destruction. Later he regretted his support for the Iraq War. Biden supported military installations in Delaware and Amtrak, which he used to commute. He supported bankruptcy legislation sought by a Delaware company, in opposition to leading Democrats and consumer rights organizations. He was one of the least wealthy members of the Senate, and was known for his gaffes.

In 2001, Biden became the senior United States Senator from Delaware and the dean of the state's congressional delegation after his fellow colleague William Roth left following his defeat in the 2000 Senate election.

In 2007–2008, Biden ran for president again. His campaign was damaged by allegedly racially charged gaffes. He never reached double digits in the polls and dropped out after the Iowa caucus. While Biden and his fellow senator Barack Obama (who also ran) had initially disliked each other, Obama came to appreciate Biden and picked him to be his running mate. They went on to defeat Republicans John McCain and Sarah Palin. Biden later resigned from the Senate to become vice president under Obama. In the 2020 United States presidential election, four years after he left office, Biden became the 46th president of the United States, serving from 2021 to 2025.

== Electoral history ==
Following his first election in 1972, Biden was reelected to six more Senate terms, in 1978, 1984, 1990, 1996, 2002, and 2008, usually getting about 60% of the vote. He did not face strong opposition; Pete du Pont, then governor, chose not to run against him in 1984. Biden was Delaware's junior senator for 28 years due to the two-year seniority of his colleague Republican William Roth. After Tom Carper defeated Roth in 2000, Biden became Delaware's senior senator. He then became the longest-serving senator in Delaware history and, as of 2018, was the 18th-longest-serving senator in U.S. history. In May 1999, Biden became the youngest senator to cast 10,000 votes.

== 1972 U.S. Senate campaign in Delaware ==
Biden, who was a member of the New Castle County Council, ran in the senate election against Republican incumbent senator J. Caleb Boggs. Boggs was considering retirement, which would likely have left incumbent U.S. Representative Pete du Pont and Wilmington Mayor Harry G. Haskell Jr. in a divisive primary fight. To avoid that, President Nixon helped convince Boggs to run again with full party support. No other Democrat wanted to run against Boggs.

Biden's campaign had little and was given no chance of winning. His sister, Valerie Biden Owens, managed his campaign (as she would his future campaigns) and other family members staffed it. The campaign relied upon handed-out newsprint position papers and meeting voters face-to-face; the state's smallness and lack of a major media market made that approach feasible. He did receive some help from the AFL–CIO and Democratic pollster Patrick Caddell. His campaign focused on withdrawal from Vietnam, the environment, civil rights, mass transit, more equitable taxation, health care, the public's dissatisfaction with politics as usual, and "change". During the summer, he trailed by almost 30 percentage points, but his energy level, his attractive young family, and his ability to connect with voters' emotions gave him an advantage over the ready-to-retire Boggs. Biden won the November 7 election by 3,162 votes.

Results of the 1972 U.S. Senate election in Delaware by county: Biden: 40–50%; 50–60%; 60–70%; 70–80%; Boggs: 40–50%; 50–60%; 60–70%

== Family deaths ==
On December 18, 1972, Biden's wife Neilia and their one-year-old daughter Amy were killed in an automobile accident in Hockessin, Delaware, causing each of his children bone fractures. Biden considered resigning to care for them, but Senate Majority Leader Mike Mansfield persuaded him not to.

== Start and remarriage ==
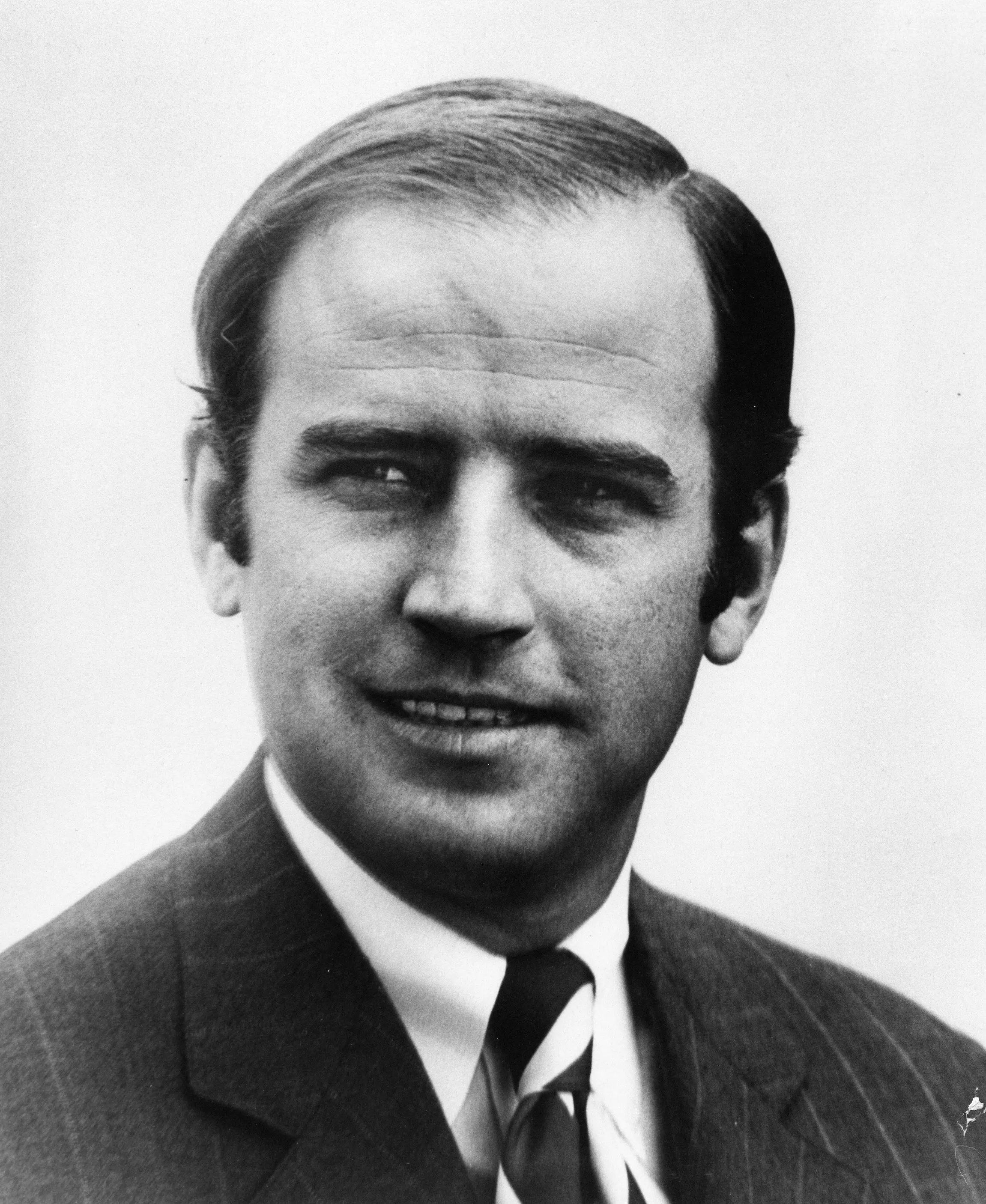
Joe Biden in 1973

Biden was sworn into office on January 5, 1973, by secretary of the Senate Francis R. Valeo in a small chapel at the Delaware Division of the Wilmington Medical Center. Beau was wheeled in with his leg still in traction; Hunter, who had already been released, was also there, as were other members of the extended family. Witnesses and television cameras were also present and the event received national attention.

At age thirty, Biden became the seventh-youngest senator in U.S. history, and one of only eighteen who took office before turning thirty-one. However, the accident that killed his wife and daughter left him filled with both anger and religious doubt: "I liked to [walk around seedy neighborhoods] at night when I thought there was a better chance of finding a fight ... I had not known I was capable of such rage ... I felt God had played a horrible trick on me." To be at home every day for his two young sons, Biden began commuting every day by an Amtrak train ninety minutes each way from his Delaware home to Washington, D.C., which he continued to do throughout his Senate career. In the accident's aftermath, Biden had trouble focusing on work and appeared to just go through the motions of being a senator. In his memoirs, Biden notes that his staffers were taking bets on how long he would last. A single father for five years, he left standing orders that he be interrupted in the Senate at any time if his sons called. In remembrance of his wife and daughter, Biden does not work on December 18, the anniversary of the accident.

In 1975, Biden met teacher Jill Tracy Jacobs, which he credits her with renewing his interest in both politics and life. They married in 1977 at the Chapel at the United Nations in New York, and welcomed their daughter Ashley in 1981.

== Early activities ==
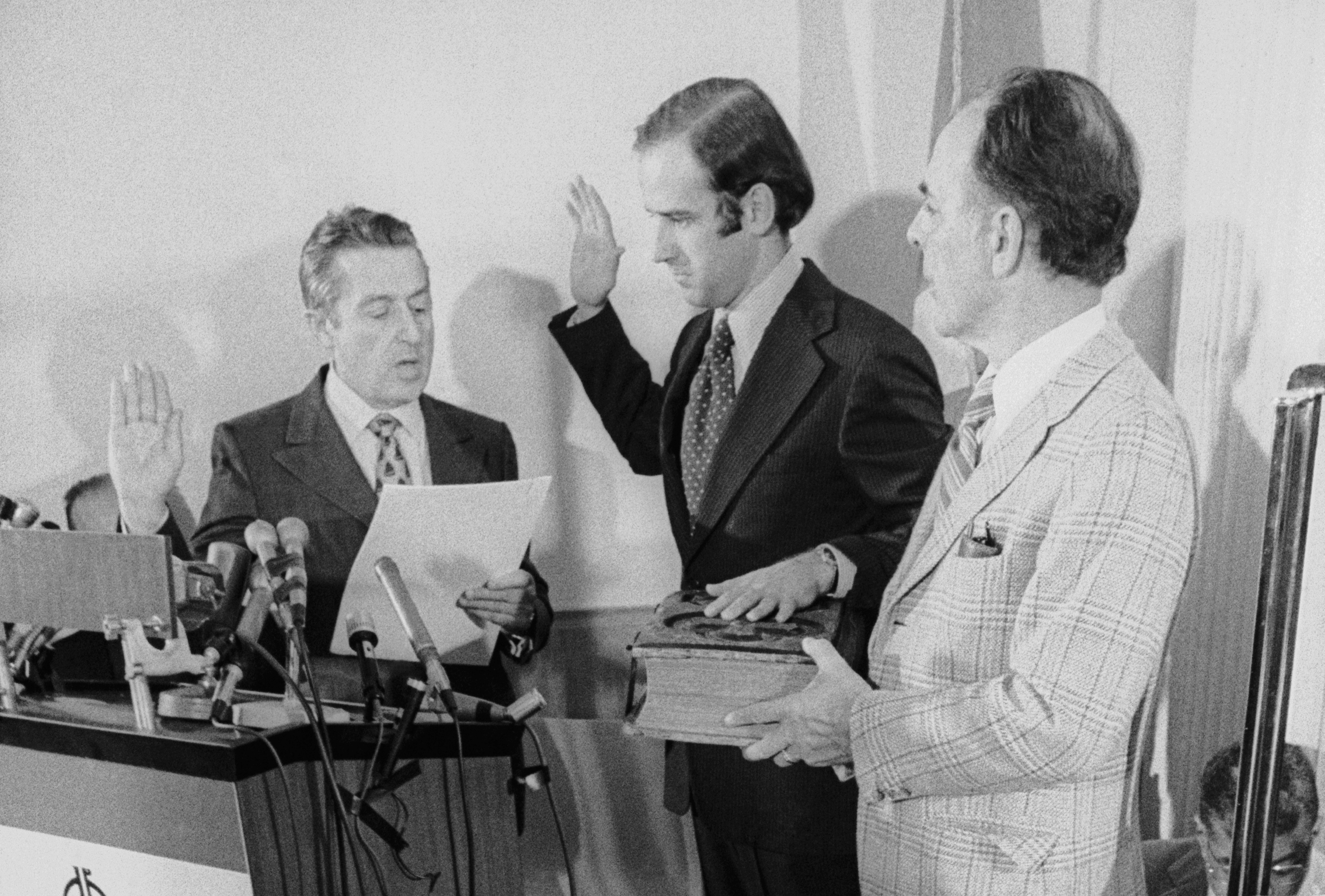
Secretary of the Senate Francis R. Valeo swearing in Biden into the Senate on January 5, 1973

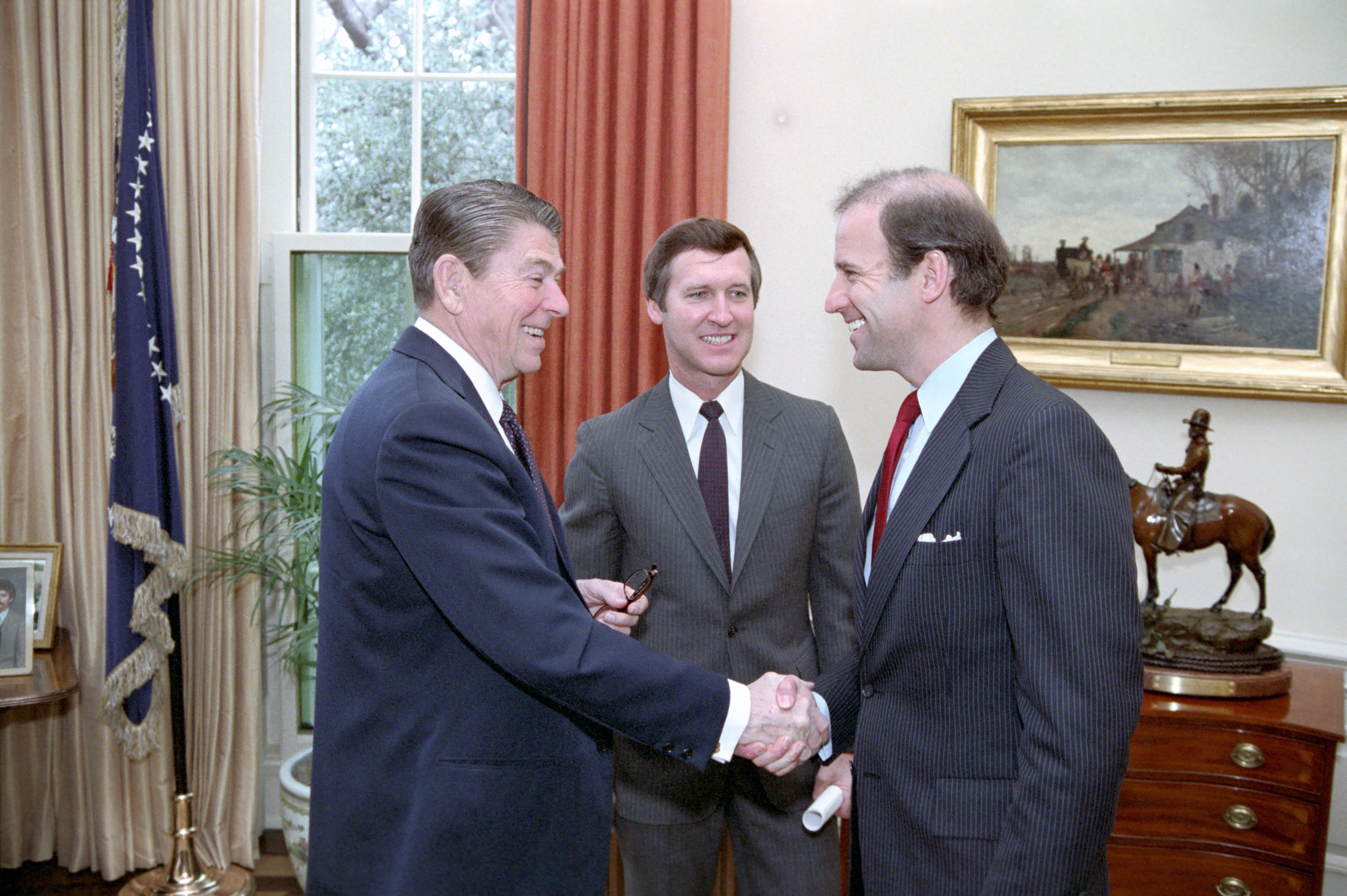
Biden (right) greets President Ronald Reagan, 1984

During his first years in the Senate, Biden focused on consumer protection and environmental issues and called for greater government accountability. In 1974, Biden was named by Time magazine as one of the 200 Faces for the Future in a profile that mentioned what had happened to his family, calling him "self-confident" and "compulsively ambitious". In a June 1, 1974, interview with the Washingtonian, Biden described himself as liberal on civil rights and liberties, senior citizens' concerns and healthcare, but conservative on other issues, including abortion and the draft.

Biden became ranking minority member of the U.S. Senate Committee on the Judiciary in 1981. In 1984, he was a Democratic floor manager for the successful passage of the Comprehensive Crime Control Act. Over time, the law's tough-on-crime provisions became controversial on the left and among criminal justice reform proponents, and in 2019 Biden called his role in passing the legislation a "big mistake". His supporters praised him for modifying some of the law's worst provisions, and it was his most important legislative accomplishment at that time. He first considered running for president that year, after gaining notice for speeches he gave to party audiences that simultaneously scolded and encouraged Democrats.

In 1993, Biden voted in favor of 10 U.S.C. §654, a section of a broader federally mandated policy that deemed homosexuality incompatible with military life thereby banning gay Americans from serving in the United States armed forces in any capacity without exception. The law was subsequently modified by President Clinton through the issuance of DOD Directive 1304.26 (subsequently nicknamed "Don't Ask, Don't Tell" or DADT) which accommodated "closeted" service to the extent that a servicemember's homosexual sexual orientation was neither discovered nor disclosed. The ban was held unconstitutional in Log Cabin Republicans v. United States for violation of First and Fifth Amendment rights.

In 1996, Biden voted in favor of the Defense of Marriage Act (1 U.S.C. §7), which prohibited the federal government from recognizing any same-sex marriage, barring individuals in such marriages from equal protection under federal law, and allowing states to do the same. In 2013, Section 3 of DOMA was ruled unconstitutional and partially struck down in United States v. Windsor. The Obama Administration did not defend the law and congratulated Windsor. In 2015, DOMA was ruled unconstitutional in totality in Obergefell v. Hodges.

Regarding foreign policy, during his first decade in the Senate, Biden focused on arms control issues. In response to Congress's refusal to ratify the SALT II Treaty signed in 1979 by Soviet leader Leonid Brezhnev and President Jimmy Carter, Biden took the initiative to meet with Soviet foreign minister Andrei Gromyko, educate him about American concerns and interests, and secure several changes to address the Foreign Relations Committee's objections. When the Reagan administration wanted to interpret the 1972 SALT I Treaty loosely to allow the Strategic Defense Initiative to proceed, Biden argued for strict adherence to the treaty's terms. He clashed again with the Reagan administration in 1986 over economic sanctions against South Africa, receiving considerable attention when he excoriated Secretary of State George P. Shultz at a Senate hearing because of the administration's support of that country, which continued to practice apartheid. Biden claimed neutrality on the 1982 Lebanon War in public, but was described to have been more enthusiastic about Israel's invasion of Lebanon than the Israeli prime minister Menachem Begin, in a June 1982 private meeting between Begin and the US Senate Foreign Relations Committee.

== Opposition to mandatory desegregation busing ==
In the mid-1970s, Biden was one of the Senate's leading opponents of mandatory desegregation busing. His white Delaware constituents strongly opposed it, and such opposition nationwide later led his party to mostly abandon school desegregation policies.

In his first Senate campaign, Biden expressed support for the Supreme Court's 1971 Swann decision, which supported busing programs to integrate school districts to remedy de jure segregation, but opposed it to remedy de facto segregation, as in Delaware. He said Republicans were using busing as a scare tactic to court Southern white votes, and along with Boggs voiced opposition to a House of Representatives constitutional amendment banning busing. In 1974, Biden voted to table an amendment to an omnibus education bill promoted by Edward Gurney (R-FL) that contained anti-busing measures and anti-school desegregation clauses. In May, Senator Robert Griffin (R-MI) attempted to revive an amended version of the amendment. Minority Leader Hugh Scott (R-PA) and Majority Leader Mike Mansfield (D-MT) offered to leave the text of Griffin's amendment intact but add the qualifier that such legislation was not intended to weaken the judiciary's power to enforce the 5th and 14th Amendments of the U.S. Constitution. Biden voted for this compromise, angering his local voters.

Following this, some Delaware residents met at the Krebs School in Newport to protest integration. Biden spoke to the auditorium and said his position on school busing was evolving, emphasizing that busing in Delaware was in his opinion beyond court restrictions. The crowd was unconvinced, and heckled him until he yielded the microphone. This, along with the prospect of a busing plan in Wilmington, led Biden to align himself with civil rights opponent Senator Jesse Helms (R-NC) in opposing busing. Biden and anti-busing senators wanted to limit the scope of Title VI of the Civil Rights Act of 1964 with respect to the federal government's power to enforce school integration policies. After 1975, Biden took a harsher line on further legislative action to limit busing. That year, Helms proposed an anti-integration amendment to an education bill that would stop the Department of Health, Education, and Welfare (HEW) from collecting data about students' or teachers' races and thereby prevent it from defunding districts that refused to integrate. Biden supported this amendment, saying: "I am sure it comes as a surprise to some of my colleagues ... that a senator with a voting record such as mine stands up and supports" it. He said busing was a "bankrupt idea [that violated] the cardinal rule of common sense", and that his opposition would make it easier for other liberals to follow suit. But he had also supported integrationist Senator Edward Brooke's (R-MA) initiatives on housing, job opportunities and voting rights. Civil rights lawyer and NAACP Legal Defense Fund director Jack Greenberg criticized Biden's support for the bill, saying it "heave[d] a brick through the window of school integration", with Biden's hand on the brick.

Biden supported a measure Senator Robert Byrd (D-WV) sponsored that forbade the use of federal funds to transport students beyond their closest school. This was adopted as part of the Labor-HEW Appropriations Act of 1976. In 1977, Biden co-sponsored an amendment with Thomas Eagleton (D-MO) to close loopholes in Byrd's amendment. A 1977 status report on school desegregation by the federal Civil Rights Commission in Washington, D.C., said, "the enactment of Eagleton-Biden would be an actual violation, on the part of the Federal Government, of the fifth amendment and Title VI" of the Civil Rights Act. President Carter signed the amendment into law in 1978. Biden repeatedly asked for, and received, the support of Senator James Eastland (D-MS) on anti-busing measures.

== 1988 presidential campaign ==
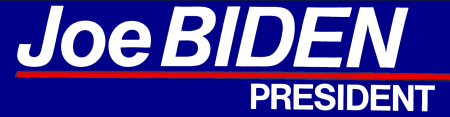
Biden's 1988 campaign logo

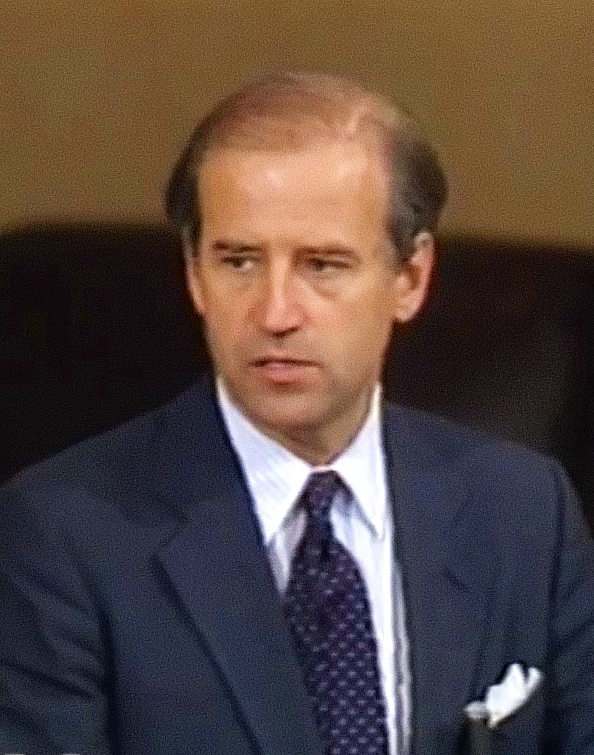
Biden during the passing of the Tax Reform Act of 1986

Biden ran for the 1988 Democratic presidential nomination, formally declaring his candidacy at the Wilmington train station on June 9, 1987. He was attempting to become the youngest president since John F. Kennedy. When the campaign began, he was considered a potentially strong candidate because of his moderate image, his speaking ability on the stump, his appeal to Baby Boomers, his high-profile position as chair of the Senate Judiciary Committee at the upcoming Robert Bork Supreme Court nomination hearings, and his fundraising appeal. He raised $1.7 million in the first quarter of 1987, more than any other candidate.

By August 1987, Biden's campaign, whose messaging was confused due to staff rivalries, had begun to lag behind those of Michael Dukakis and Dick Gephardt, though he had still raised more funds than any candidate but Dukakis, and was seeing an upturn in Iowa polls. In September 1987, the campaign ran into trouble when he was accused of plagiarizing a speech that had been made earlier that year by British Labour Party leader Neil Kinnock. Kinnock's speech included the lines:

Why am I the first Kinnock in a thousand generations to be able to get to university? [Then pointing to his wife in the audience] Why is Glenys the first woman in her family in a thousand generations to be able to get to university? Was it because all our predecessors were thick?

While Biden's speech included the lines:

I started thinking as I was coming over here, why is it that Joe Biden is the first in his family ever to go to a university? [Then pointing to his wife in the audience] Why is it that my wife who is sitting out there in the audience is the first in her family to ever go to college? Is it because our fathers and mothers were not bright? Is it because I'm the first Biden in a thousand generations to get a college and a graduate degree that I was smarter than the rest?

Biden had in fact cited Kinnock as the source for the formulation on previous occasions. But he made no reference to the original source at the August 23 Democratic debate at the Iowa State Fair being reported on, or in an August 26 interview with the National Education Association. Moreover, while political speeches often appropriate ideas and language from each other, Biden's use came under more scrutiny because he changed aspects of his own family's background to match Kinnock's. Biden was soon found to have lifted passages from a 1967 speech by Robert F. Kennedy earlier that year (for which his aides took the blame), and a short phrase from the 1961 inaugural address of John F. Kennedy; and to have done the same with a 1976 passage from Hubert H. Humphrey two years earlier.

A few days later, Biden's plagiarism incident in law school came to public light. Video was also released showing that when earlier questioned by a New Hampshire resident about his grades in law school, he had said he graduated in the "top half" of his class, that he had attended law school on a full scholarship, and that he had received three degrees in college, each of which was untrue or an exaggeration. Advisers and reporters pointed out that he falsely claimed to have marched in the civil rights movement.

The limited amount of other news about the race amplified these revelations, when most of the public was not yet paying attention to the campaigns; Biden thus fell into what The Washington Post writer Paul Taylor called that year's trend, a "trial by media ordeal". Lacking a strong group of supporters to help him survive the crisis, he withdrew from the race on September 23, 1987, saying his candidacy had been overrun by "the exaggerated shadow" of his past mistakes.

After Biden withdrew, it was revealed that the Dukakis campaign had secretly made a video highlighting the Biden–Kinnock comparison and distributed it to news outlets. Later in 1987, the Delaware Supreme Court's Board of Professional Responsibility cleared Biden of the law school plagiarism charges regarding his standing as a lawyer, saying Biden had "not violated any rules".

== Brain surgeries ==
In 1988, Biden suffered two brain aneurysms, one on the right side and one on the left. Each required surgery with high risk of long-term impact on brain functionality. In February 1988, after suffering from several episodes of increasingly severe neck pain, Biden was taken by long-distance ambulance to Walter Reed Army Medical Center and given lifesaving surgery to correct an intracranial berry aneurysm that had begun leaking. While recuperating, he suffered a pulmonary embolism, a major complication.

Another operation to repair a second aneurysm, which had caused no symptoms but was at risk of bursting, was performed in May 1988. The hospitalization and recovery kept Biden from his duties in the Senate for seven months. Biden has had no recurrences or effects from the aneurysms since then.

In retrospect, Biden's family came to believe the early end to his presidential campaign had been a blessing in disguise, for had he still been campaigning in 1988, he might well not have stopped to seek medical attention and the condition might have become unsurvivable. In 2013, Biden said, "they take a saw and they cut your head off" and "they literally had to take the top of my head off." He also said he was told he would have less than a 50% chance of full recovery.

== Senate Judiciary Committee ==
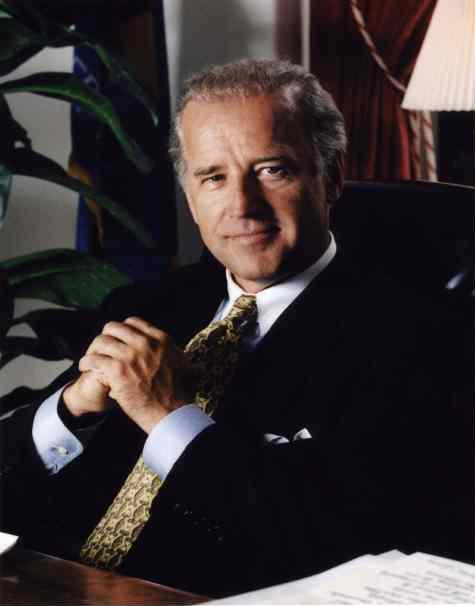
Biden, U.S. Senate portrait photo

Biden was a longtime member of the U.S. Senate Committee on the Judiciary. He chaired it from 1987 to 1995 and served as ranking minority member from 1981 to 1987 and from 1995 to 1997.

While chairman, Biden presided over two of the most contentious U.S. Supreme Court confirmation hearings in history, Robert Bork's in 1987 and Clarence Thomas's in 1991. In the Bork hearings, he stated his opposition to Bork soon after the nomination, reversing his approval in an interview of a hypothetical Bork nomination he had made the previous year and angering conservatives who thought he could not conduct the hearings fairly. At the close, he won praise for conducting the proceedings fairly and with good humor and courage, despite his presidential campaign's collapse in the middle of them. Rejecting some of the less intellectually honest arguments that other Bork opponents were making, Biden framed his discussion around the belief that the U.S. Constitution provides rights to liberty and privacy that extend beyond those explicitly enumerated in the text, and that Bork's strong originalism was ideologically incompatible with that view. Bork's nomination was rejected in the committee by a 9–5 vote, and then rejected in the full Senate, 58–42.

In the Thomas hearings, Biden's questions on constitutional issues were often long and convoluted, to the point that Thomas sometimes forgot the question being asked. Biden's style annoyed many viewers. Thomas later wrote that despite Biden's earlier private assurances, his questions had been akin to beanballs. The nomination came out of the committee without a recommendation, with Biden opposed. In part due to his own bad experiences with his presidential campaign, Biden was reluctant to let personal matters into the hearings. He initially shared with the committee, but not the public, Anita Hill's sexual harassment charges, on the grounds she was not yet willing to testify. After she did, Biden did not permit other witnesses to testify further on her behalf, such as Angela Wright (who was present, waiting to testify, and who had made a similar charge) and experts on harassment. Biden said he was striving to preserve Thomas's right to privacy and the hearings' decency. The full Senate confirmed Thomas by a 52–48 vote, with Biden again opposed. During and afterward, liberal legal groups and women's groups strongly criticized Biden for mishandling the hearings and not doing enough to support Hill. Biden later sought out women to serve on the Judiciary Committee and emphasized women's issues in the committee's legislative agenda. In April 2019, he called Hill to express regret over how he treated her; after the conversation, Hill said she remained deeply unsatisfied.

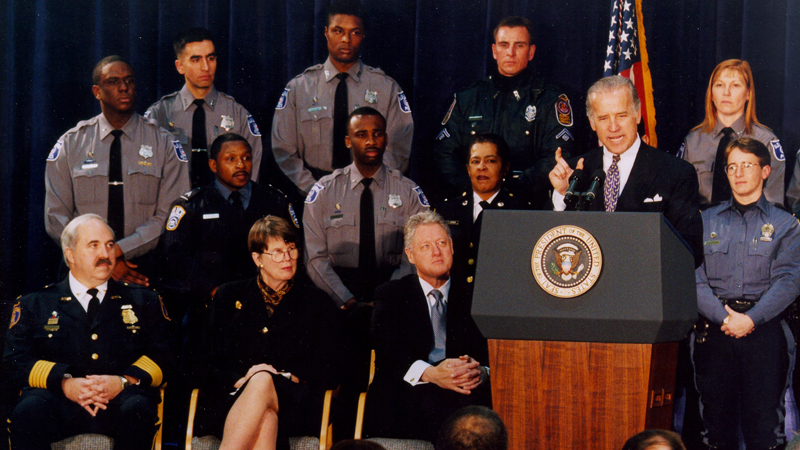
Biden spoke at the signing of the Violent Crime Control and Law Enforcement Act in 1994.

Biden was involved in crafting many federal crime laws. In the process of writing the legislation, Biden sought input and counsel from women's organizations, advocates, and survivors across the country. He spearheaded the Violent Crime Control and Law Enforcement Act of 1994, also known as the Biden Crime Law, which included the Federal Assault Weapons Ban, which expired in 2004 after its ten-year sunset period and was not renewed. It also included the Violence Against Women Act (VAWA), which contains a broad array of measures to combat domestic violence. In 2000, the Supreme Court ruled in United States v. Morrison that the VAWA section allowing a federal civil remedy for victims of gender-motivated violence exceeded Congress's authority and was therefore unconstitutional. Congress reauthorized VAWA in 2000 and 2005. Biden has said, "I consider the Violence Against Women Act the single most significant legislation that I've crafted during my 35-year tenure in the Senate." In 2004 and 2005, he enlisted major American technology companies in diagnosing the problems of the Austin, Texas-based National Domestic Violence Hotline, and to donate equipment and expertise to it in a successful effort to improve its services.

Biden was critical of the actions of Independent Counsel Kenneth Starr during the 1990s Whitewater controversy and Clinton–Lewinsky scandal investigations, and said, "it's going to be a cold day in hell" before another Independent Counsel would be granted the same powers. He voted to acquit on both charges during the impeachment of President Clinton.

As chairman of the International Narcotics Control Caucus, Biden wrote the laws that created the U.S. "Drug Czar", who oversees and coordinates national drug control policy. In April 2003, he introduced the Reducing Americans' Vulnerability to Ecstasy (RAVE) Act. He continued to work to stop the spread of "date rape drugs" such as flunitrazepam, and party drugs such as ecstasy and ketamine. In 2004, he worked to pass a bill outlawing steroids like androstenedione, the drug many baseball players used.

Biden's "Kids 2000" legislation established a public-private partnership to provide computer centers, teachers, Internet access, and technical training to young people, particularly low-income and at-risk youth.

== Senate Foreign Relations Committee ==
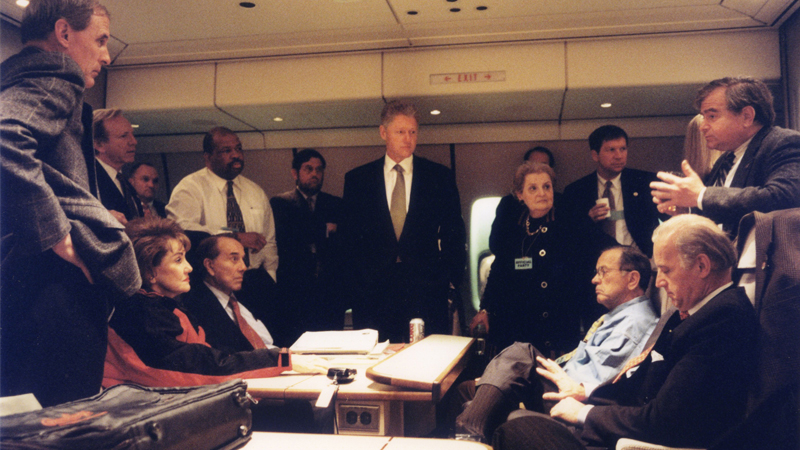
Senator Biden accompanied President Bill Clinton and other officials to Bosnia and Herzegovina in December 1997.

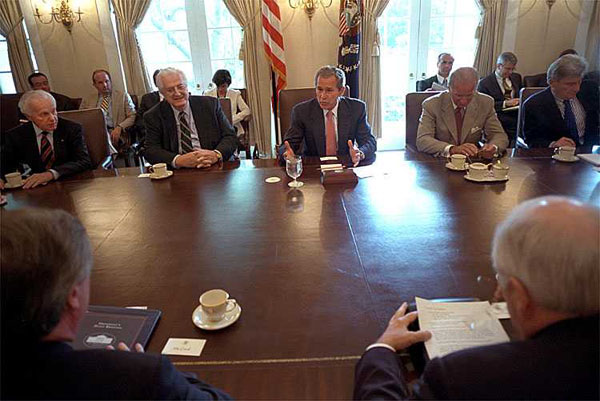
Biden and other members of Congress meet with President George W. Bush to discuss his trip to the Genoa G-8 Summit in 2001

Biden was a longtime member of the U.S. Senate Committee on Foreign Relations. In 1997, he became the ranking minority member and chaired the committee in January 2001 and from June 2001 to 2003. When Democrats retook control of the Senate after the 2006 elections, Biden again assumed the top spot on the committee. He was generally a liberal internationalist in foreign policy. He collaborated effectively with important Republican senators such as Richard Lugar and Jesse Helms and sometimes went against elements of his own party. Biden was also co-chairman of the NATO Observer Group in the Senate. A partial list covering this time showed Biden meeting with 150 leaders from nearly 60 countries and international organizations. He held frequent hearings as chairman of the committee, as well as many subcommittee hearings during the three times he chaired the Subcommittee on European Affairs.

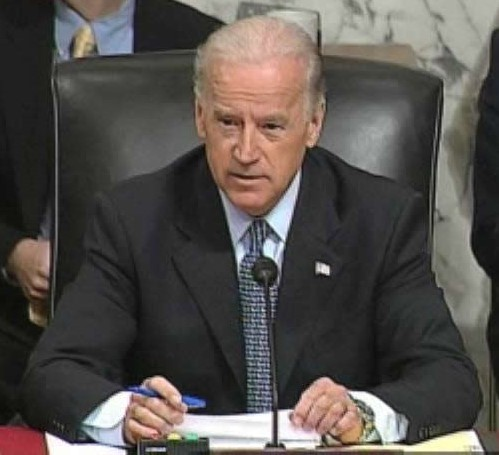
Biden gives an opening statement and takes questions at a Senate Foreign Relations Committee hearing on Iraq, 2007

Biden voted against authorization for the Gulf War in 1991, siding with 45 of the 55 Democratic senators; he said the U.S. was bearing almost all the burden in the anti-Iraq coalition.

Biden became interested in the Yugoslav Wars after hearing about Serbian abuses during the Croatian War of Independence in 1991. Once the Bosnian War broke out, Biden was among the first to call for the "lift and strike" policy of lifting the arms embargo, training Bosnian Muslims and supporting them with NATO air strikes, and investigating war crimes. The George H. W. Bush administration and Clinton administration were both reluctant to implement the policy, fearing Balkan entanglement. In April 1993, Biden spent a week in the Balkans and held a tense three-hour meeting with Serbian leader Slobodan Milošević. Biden related that he had told Milošević, "I think you're a damn war criminal and you should be tried as one." Biden wrote an amendment in 1992 to compel the Bush administration to arm the Bosnians, but deferred in 1994 to a somewhat softer stance the Clinton administration preferred, before signing on the following year to a stronger measure sponsored by Bob Dole and Joe Lieberman. The engagement led to a successful NATO peacekeeping effort. Biden has called his role in affecting Balkans policy in the mid-1990s his "proudest moment in public life" related to foreign policy.

In April 1992, Biden wrote an essay in Wall Street Journal in which he iterated his vision of U.S. foreign policy. Biden advocated to "exercise a diplomatic leadership that puts new muscle into institutions of collective security." Additionally, he stated, "The Senate has tried to force China's leaders to choose between Third World arms sales [...] and open trade with the U.S. Even though we have convincing intelligence that China's leaders fear the use of this leverage, the president [H.W. Bush] inexplicably refuses to challenge Beijing."

As chair, Biden contributed to successfully encouraging the Clinton administration to commit the resources and political capital to broker what became the 1998 Good Friday Agreement between the governments of Ireland and the United Kingdom through the Northern Ireland peace process.

In 1998, Congressional Quarterly named Biden one of "Twelve Who Made a Difference" for playing a lead role in several foreign policy matters, including NATO enlargement and the successful passage of bills to streamline foreign affairs agencies and punish religious persecution overseas.

In May 1998, during the 1996 United States campaign finance controversy, Senator Biden expressed concern about the Clinton Administration's decision to shift the right to oversee waivers for satellite exports to China to the Commerce Department instead of State Department. Biden said that on television news that if "any correlation" was known between the satellite policy change and campaign contributions, it should be "ferreted out." On May 29, 1998, a Democratic Task Force of several Senators that included Biden, led by Senate Minority Leader Daschle, approved another Senate Task Force, led by Senate Majority Leader Lott, that investigated and criticized the policy of exporting commercial satellites to China which largely ended that year.

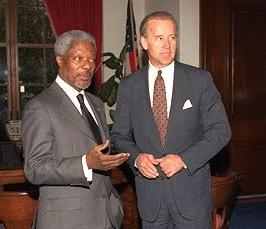
Senator Biden and UN Secretary-General Kofi Annan in March 1998.

On September 3, 1998, the resigning former UN weapons inspector Scott Ritter had, according to Barton Gellman, accused the Clinton administration of obstructing weapons inspections in Iraq. Senator Biden joined many other Senate Democrats and "amplified on the Clinton administration's counterattack against former UN weapons inspector Scott Ritter." Biden questioned if the inspector was trying to "appropriate the power 'to decide when to pull the trigger' of military force against Iraq," and said that the Secretary of State would also have to consider the opinion of allies, the UNSC, and public opinion, before any potential intervention in Iraq. In a Washington Post op-ed later that month, Biden criticized a unilateral "confrontation-based policy" but praised the idea of asking the question of whether intervention might be necessary at some point, though said it was "above the pay grade" of one weapons inspector.

In 1999, during the Kosovo War, Biden supported the NATO bombing campaign against Serbia and Montenegro, and co-sponsored with John McCain the McCain-Biden Kosovo Resolution. This bill called on President Clinton to use all necessary force, including ground troops, to confront Milošević over Serbian actions in Kosovo toward ethnic Albanians.

Biden was a strong supporter of the 2001 War in Afghanistan, saying, "Whatever it takes, we should do it."

As head of the Senate Foreign Relations Committee, Biden said in 2002 that Saddam Hussein was a threat to national security and there was no option but to "eliminate" that threat. In October 2002, he voted in favor of the Authorization for Use of Military Force Against Iraq, approving the U.S. invasion of Iraq. More significantly, as chair of the committee, he assembled a series of witnesses to testify in favor of the authorization. They gave testimony misrepresenting the intent, history and status of Saddam and his Sunni government, which was an openly avowed enemy of al-Qaida, and touting Iraq's possession of weapons of mass destruction.

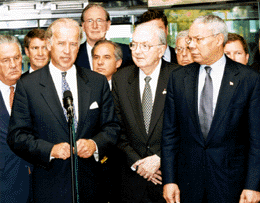
Senator Biden, Senator Jesse Helms (center), Secretary of State Colin Powell (right), and other Senate Foreign Relations Committee members discussing the war on terror, October 2001

While he eventually became a critic of the war and viewed his vote and role as a "mistake", he did not push for U.S. withdrawal. He supported the appropriations to pay for the occupation, but argued repeatedly that the war should be internationalized, that more soldiers were needed, and that the Bush administration should "level with the American people" about the cost and length of the conflict. By late 2006, Biden's stance had shifted considerably, and he opposed the troop surge of 2007, saying General David Petraeus was "dead, flat wrong" in believing the surge could work. Biden instead advocated dividing Iraq into a loose federation of three ethnic states. In November 2006, Biden and Leslie H. Gelb, President Emeritus of the Council on Foreign Relations, released a comprehensive strategy to end sectarian violence in Iraq. Rather than continuing the present approach or withdrawing, the plan called for "a third way": federalizing Iraq and giving Kurds, Shiites, and Sunnis "breathing room" in their own regions. In September 2007, a non-binding resolution endorsing such a scheme passed the Senate, but the idea was unfamiliar, had no political constituency, and failed to gain traction. Iraq's political leadership denounced the resolution as de facto partitioning of the country, and the U.S. Embassy in Baghdad issued a statement distancing itself from it.

In March 2004, Biden secured the brief release of Libyan democracy activist and political prisoner Fathi Eljahmi, after meeting with leader Muammar Gaddafi in Tripoli. In May 2008, Biden sharply criticized President George W. Bush for his speech to Israel's Knesset, where he suggested some Democrats were acting the way some Western leaders did when they appeased Hitler in the run-up to World War II. Biden said, "This is bullshit. This is malarkey. This is outrageous. Outrageous for the president of the United States to go to a foreign country, sit in the Knesset ... and make this kind of ridiculous statement ... Since when does this administration think that if you sit down, you have to eliminate the word 'no' from your vocabulary?" He later apologized for using the expletive.

== Delaware matters ==
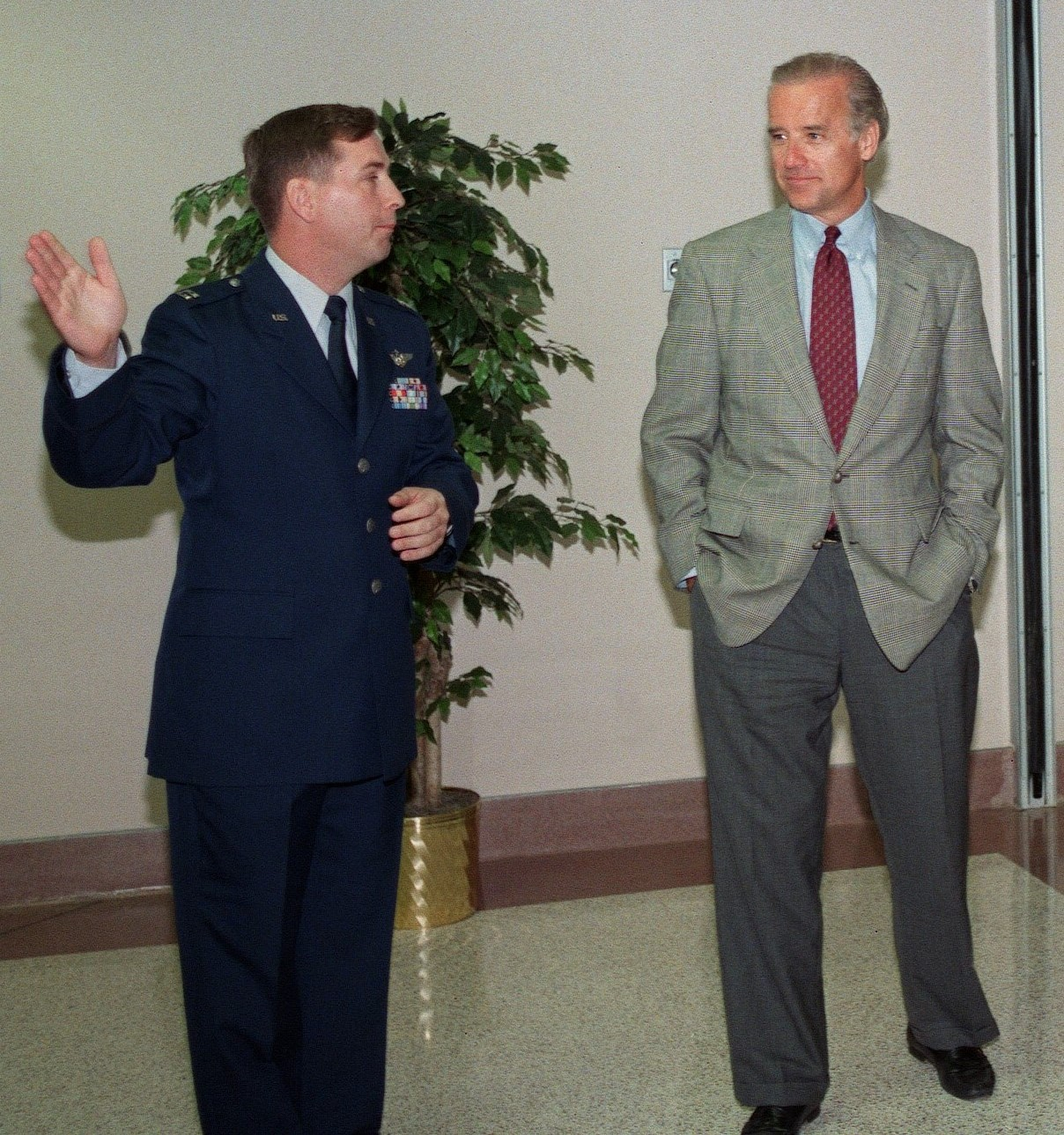
Biden tours a new facility at Delaware's Dover Air Force Base, October 1997

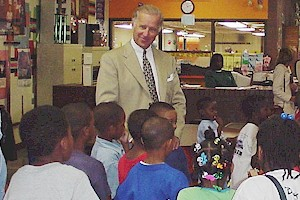
Senator Biden meets with children at the H. Fletcher Brown Boys & Girls Club in Wilmington, Delaware, August 1999

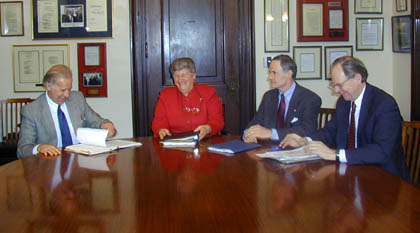
From Left to Right: Senator Biden, Governor Ruth Ann Minner, Senator Tom Carper, and Representative Mike Castle in a meeting, 2001

Biden was a familiar figure to his Delaware constituency, by virtue of his daily train commute from there, and generally sought to attend to state needs. He strongly supported increased Amtrak funding and rail security; he hosted barbecues and an annual Christmas dinner for the Amtrak crews, who sometimes held the last train of the night a few minutes so he could catch it. He earned the nickname "Amtrak Joe" as a result (and in 2011, Amtrak's Wilmington Station was named the Joseph R. Biden Jr. Railroad Station, in honor of the 7,000-plus trips he made from there). He was an advocate for Delaware military installations, including Dover Air Force Base and New Castle Air National Guard Base.

In 1978, when Biden was seeking reelection to the Senate, Wilmington's federally mandated cross-district busing plan generated much turmoil. Biden's compromise solution between his white constituents and African-American leaders was to introduce legislation to outlaw the court's power to enforce certain types of busing, while allowing it to end segregation school districts had deliberately imposed. White anti-integrationists seized on a comment Biden made that he would support the use of federal helicopters if Wilmington's schools could not be voluntarily integrated, and Delaware NAACP head Littleton P. Mitchell later said Biden "adequately represented our community for many years, but he quivered that one time on busing." The compromise nearly alienated him from both working-class whites and African-Americans, but tensions ended after the end of a teachers' strike that began over pay issues raised by the busing plan.

Beginning in 1991, Biden served as an adjunct professor at the Widener University School of Law, Delaware's only law school, teaching a seminar on constitutional law. The seminar was one of Widener's most popular, often with a waiting list for enrollment. Biden typically co-taught the course with another professor, taking on at least half the course minutes and sometimes flying back from overseas to make one of the classes.

During the 2000s, Biden sponsored bankruptcy legislation that was sought by MBNA, one of Delaware's largest companies, and other credit card issuers. He allowed an amendment to the bill to increase the homestead exemption for homeowners declaring bankruptcy and fought for an amendment to forbid anti-abortion felons from using bankruptcy to discharge fines; President Clinton vetoed the bill in 2000 but it finally passed in 2005 as the Bankruptcy Abuse Prevention and Consumer Protection Act, with Biden supporting it. A vociferous supporter, Biden was one of only 18 Democratic senators to vote with the Republicans in favor of the legislation, while leading Democrats and consumer rights organizations came out in opposition.

Biden held up trade agreements with Russia when that country stopped importing U.S. chickens. The downstate Sussex County region is the nation's top chicken-producing area.

In 2007, Biden requested and gained $67 million worth of projects for his constituents through congressional earmarks.

== Wealth ==
With a net worth between $59,000 and $366,000, and almost no outside income or investment income, Biden was consistently ranked one of the least wealthy members of the Senate. Biden said he was listed as the second-poorest member in Congress; he was not proud of the distinction, but attributed it to having been elected early in his career. He has said he realized early in his senatorial career how vulnerable poorer public officials are to offers of financial contributions in exchange for policy support, and pushed campaign finance reform measures during his first term.

== Gaffes ==
During his years as a senator, Biden acquired a reputation for loquaciousness and "putting his foot in his mouth". He has been a strong speaker and debater and a frequent and effective guest on Sunday morning talk shows. In public appearances, he is known to deviate from prepared remarks. The New York Times wrote that Biden's "weak filters make him capable of blurting out pretty much anything".

== Analysis ==
The political writer Howard Fineman has said, "Biden is not an academic, he's not a theoretical thinker, he's a great street pol. He comes from a long line of working people in Scranton—auto salesmen, car dealers, people who know how to make a sale. He has that great Irish gift." Political columnist David S. Broder has viewed Biden as having grown since he came to Washington and since his failed 1988 presidential bid: "He responds to real people—that's been consistent throughout. And his ability to understand himself and deal with other politicians has gotten much much better." Traub concludes that "Biden is the kind of fundamentally happy person who can be as generous toward others as he is to himself."

== 2008 presidential campaign ==
Biden's 2008 campaign logo

Biden thought about running for president again ever since his failed 1988 bid. (Note: Biden chose not to run for president in 1992 in part because he had voted against the resolution authorizing the Gulf War. He considered joining the Democratic field of candidates for the 2004 presidential race but in August 2003 decided otherwise, saying he did not have enough time and any attempt would be too much of a long shot. Around 2004, Biden was also widely discussed as a possible Secretary of State in a Democratic administration.) He declared his candidacy for president on January 31, 2007, after having discussed running for months. Biden made a formal announcement to Tim Russert on Meet the Press, saying he would "be the best Biden I can be". In January 2006, Delaware newspaper columnist Harry F. Themal wrote that Biden "occupies the sensible center of the Democratic Party". Themal concluded that that was the position Biden desired, and that in a campaign "he plans to stress the dangers to the security of the average American, not just from the terrorist threat, but from the lack of health assistance, crime, and energy dependence on unstable parts of the world."

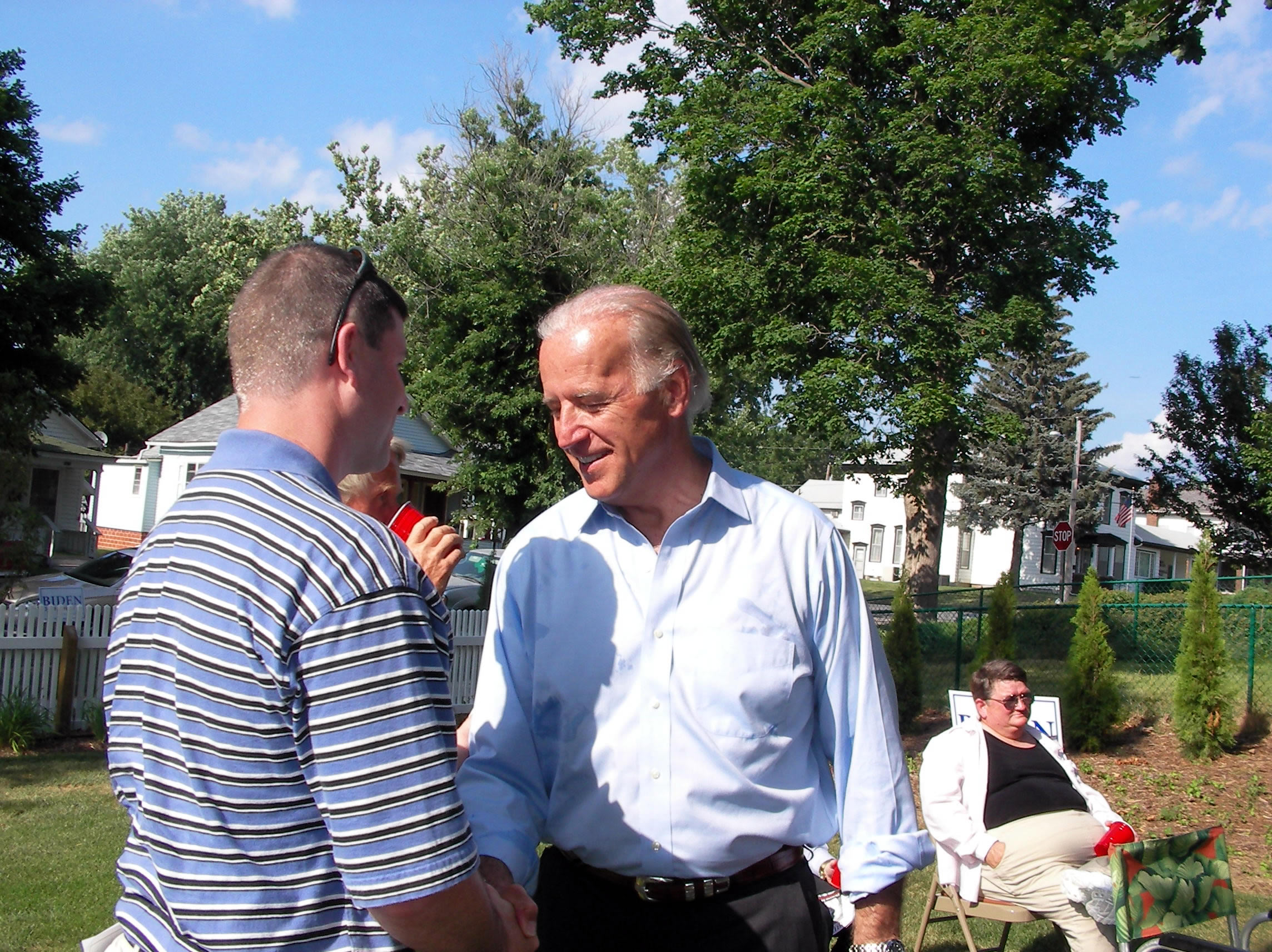
Biden campaigns at a house party in Creston, Iowa, July 2007

During his campaign, Biden focused on the war in Iraq and his support for implementing the Biden-Gelb plan to achieve political success. He touted his record in the Senate as the head of major congressional committees and his experience in foreign policy. Despite speculation to the contrary, Biden rejected the notion of becoming Secretary of State, focusing on only the presidency. At a 2007 campaign event, Biden said, "I know a lot of my opponents out there say I'd be a great secretary of state. Seriously, every one of them. Do you watch any of the debates? 'Joe's right, Joe's right, Joe's right.'" Other candidates' comments that "Joe is right" in the Democratic debates were converted into a Biden campaign theme and ad. In mid-2007, Biden stressed his foreign policy expertise compared to Obama's, saying of the latter, "I think he can be ready, but right now I don't believe he is. The presidency is not something that lends itself to on-the-job training." Biden also said Obama was copying some of his foreign policy ideas. Biden was noted for his one-liners on the campaign trail, saying of Republican then-frontrunner Rudy Giuliani at the debate on October 30, 2007, in Philadelphia, "There's only three things he mentions in a sentence: a noun, and a verb and 9/11." Overall, Biden's debate performances were an effective mixture of humor, and sharp and surprisingly disciplined comments.

Biden made controversial remarks during the campaign. On the day of his January 2007 announcement, he spoke of fellow Democratic candidate and Senator Barack Obama: "I mean, you got the first mainstream African-American who is articulate and bright and clean and a nice-looking guy—I mean, that's a storybook, man." (Note: Several linguists and political analysts said the correct transcription includes a comma after the word "African-American", which one said "would significantly change the meaning (and the degree of offensiveness) of Biden's comment".) This comment undermined his campaign as soon as it began and significantly damaged his fund-raising capabilities; it later took second place on Time magazine's list of Top 10 Campaign Gaffes for 2007. Biden had also been criticized in July 2006 for a remark he made about his support among Indian Americans: "I've had a great relationship. In Delaware, the largest growth in population is Indian-Americans moving from India. You cannot go to a 7-Eleven or a Dunkin' Donuts unless you have a slight Indian accent. I'm not joking." Biden later said the remark was not intended to be derogatory. (Note: The Indian-American activist who was on the receiving end of Biden's comment stated that he was "100 percent behind [Biden] because he did nothing wrong.")

In an unusual move, Biden shared campaign planes with one of his rivals for the nomination, Senator Chris Dodd of Connecticut. Dodd and Biden were friends and seeking to save funds during somewhat long-shot efforts at the nomination.

Overall, Biden had difficulty raising funds, struggled to draw people to his rallies, and failed to gain traction against the high-profile candidacies of Obama and Senator Hillary Clinton; he never rose above single digits in national polls of the Democratic candidates. In the first contest on January 3, 2008, Biden placed fifth in the Iowa caucuses, garnering slightly less than one percent of the state delegates. He withdrew from the race that evening, saying, "There is nothing sad about tonight. ... I feel no regret."

Despite its lack of success, Biden's stature in the political world rose as the result of his 2008 campaign. In particular, it changed the relationship between Biden and Obama. Although the two had served together on the Senate Foreign Relations Committee, they had not been close, with Biden resenting Obama's quick rise to political stardom and Obama viewing Biden as garrulous and patronizing. Having gotten to know each other during 2007, Obama appreciated Biden's campaigning style and appeal to working-class voters, and Biden said he became convinced Obama was "the real deal".

== See also ==
- Political positions of Joe Biden

=== Vice presidency (2009–2017) ===
- Vice presidency of Joe Biden (2009–2017)
- Presidency of Barack Obama (2009–2017)
- Cabinet of Barack Obama (2009–2017)
- Presidential transition of Barack Obama (2008–2009)
- First inauguration of Barack Obama
- Second inauguration of Barack Obama
- 2008 United States presidential election
- 2012 United States presidential election

=== Presidency (2021–2025) ===
- Presidency of Joe Biden (2021–2025)
- Vice presidency of Kamala Harris (2021–2025)
- Cabinet of Joe Biden (2021–2025)
- Presidential transition of Joe Biden (2020–2021)
- Inauguration of Joe Biden
- 2020 United States presidential election
