= Vice presidency of Joe Biden =

U.S. vice presidential tenure from 2009 to 2017

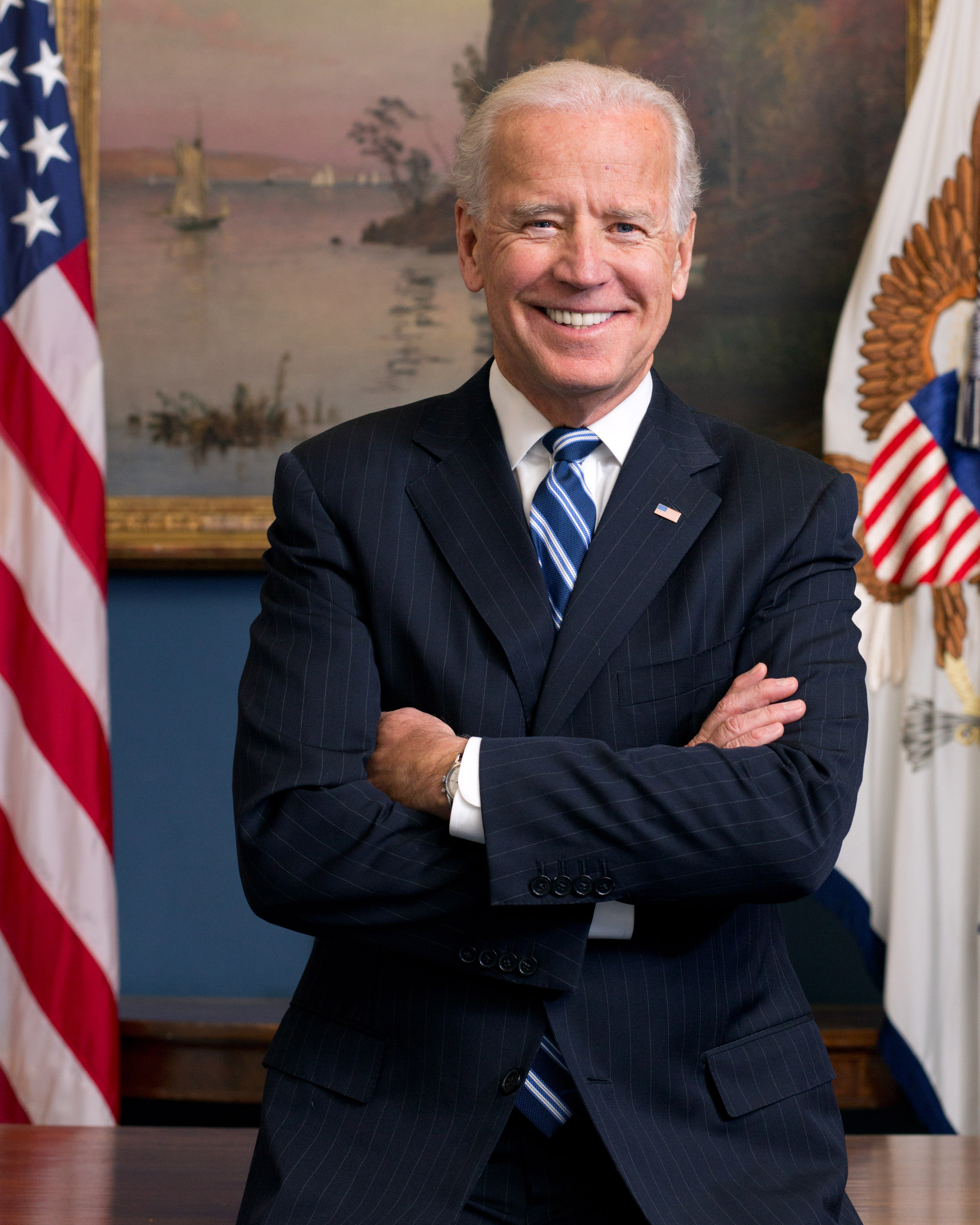
- Official portrait, 2013
- Vice presidency of Joe Biden; January 20, 2009 – January 20, 2017
- President: Barack Obama
- Cabinet: See list
- Party: Democratic
- Election: 2008; 2012
- Seat: Number One Observatory Circle
- Seal of the Vice President

Joe Biden served as the 47th vice president of the United States during the presidency of Barack Obama from January 20, 2009, to January 20, 2017. Biden, a member of the Democratic Party who previously served as a senior U.S. senator representing Delaware from 1973 to 2009, was selected as Obama's running mate and took office following their victory in the 2008 presidential election over Republican nominees John McCain and Sarah Palin. Four years later, in the 2012 presidential election, they defeated Republican nominees Mitt Romney and Paul Ryan, to win re-election. Biden was the first vice president from Delaware and the first Roman Catholic vice president in U.S. history.

Alongside Biden's vice presidency, the Democratic Party also held their majorities in the House of Representatives and the Senate during the 111th U.S. Congress following the 2008 elections, attained an overall federal government trifecta. Biden was more influential than most vice presidents due to his long Senate career and relationships with both members of Congress and politicians abroad. His relationship with Republican Senate leader Mitch McConnell was particularly important after the Republicans regained control of Congress in the 2010 and 2014 elections, and the two were instrumental in ending the 2011 and 2013 debt-ceiling crises.

Near the end of his tenure, Biden didn't run for president as the Democratic nominee in the 2016 presidential election and endorsed Hillary Clinton, who became the nominee and selected junior Virginia senator Tim Kaine as her running mate. They lost the 2016 election to the Republican ticket of businessman Donald Trump and his running mate, Indiana governor Mike Pence. As vice president in his capacity as the president of the Senate, Biden oversaw the certification of Trump and Pence as the winners of the election on January 6, 2017. Obama and Biden were succeeded in office by Trump and Pence on January 20, 2017.

After his vice presidency, Biden would go on to become the second Catholic president following his victory in the 2020 presidential election. Biden and his running mate Kamala Harris defeated Republican incumbent president and vice president, Trump and Pence, making Biden the first president to serve with a woman vice president, Black American vice president, and Asian American vice president. Biden became the first vice president to be elected president since George H. W. Bush and first since Richard Nixon to have not been elected following the end of their tenure as vice president.

== 2008 presidential election ==
=== Presidential campaign ===
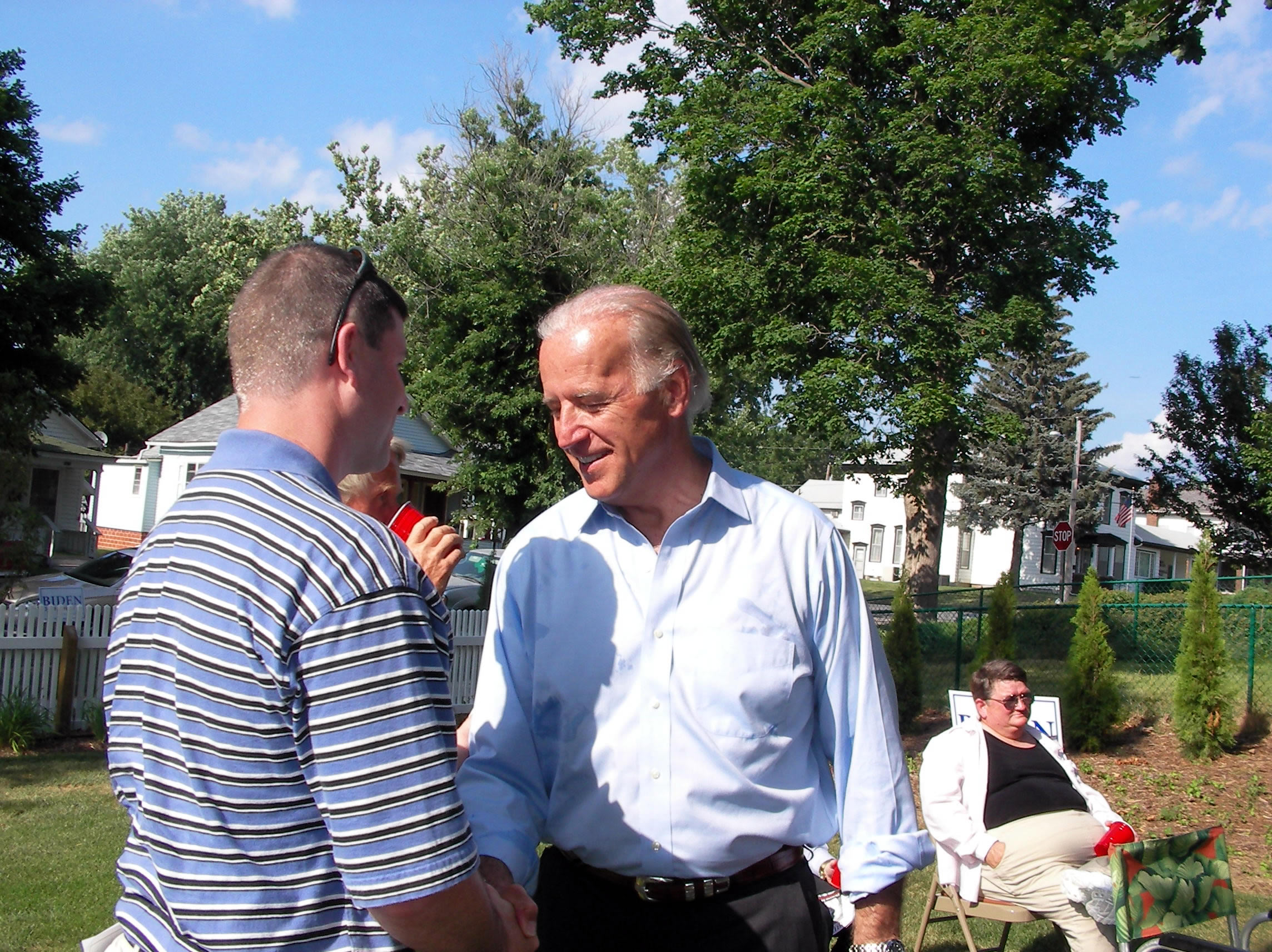
Biden campaigns at a house party in Creston, Iowa, July 2007.

After exploring running in several previous cycles, in January 2007, Biden declared his candidacy in the 2008 elections. Biden focused on the Iraq War, his record as chairman of major Senate committees, and his foreign-policy experience. Biden was noted for his one-liners during the campaign; in one debate he said of Republican candidate Rudy Giuliani, "There's only three things he mentions in a sentence: a noun, and a verb and 9/11."

Biden had difficulty raising funds, struggled to draw people to his rallies, and failed to gain traction against the high-profile candidacies of Obama and Hillary Clinton. He never rose above single digits in national polls of the Democratic candidates. In the first contest on January 3, 2008, Biden placed fifth in the Iowa caucuses, garnering slightly less than one percent of the state delegates. He withdrew from the race that evening.

Despite its lack of success, Biden's 2008 campaign raised his stature in the political world. In particular, it changed the relationship between Biden and Obama. Although they had served together on the Senate Foreign Relations Committee, they had not been close: Biden resented Obama's quick rise to political stardom, while Obama viewed Biden as garrulous and patronizing. Having gotten to know each other during 2007, Obama appreciated Biden's campaign style and appeal to working-class voters, and Biden said he became convinced Obama was "the real deal".

=== Vice presidential campaign ===
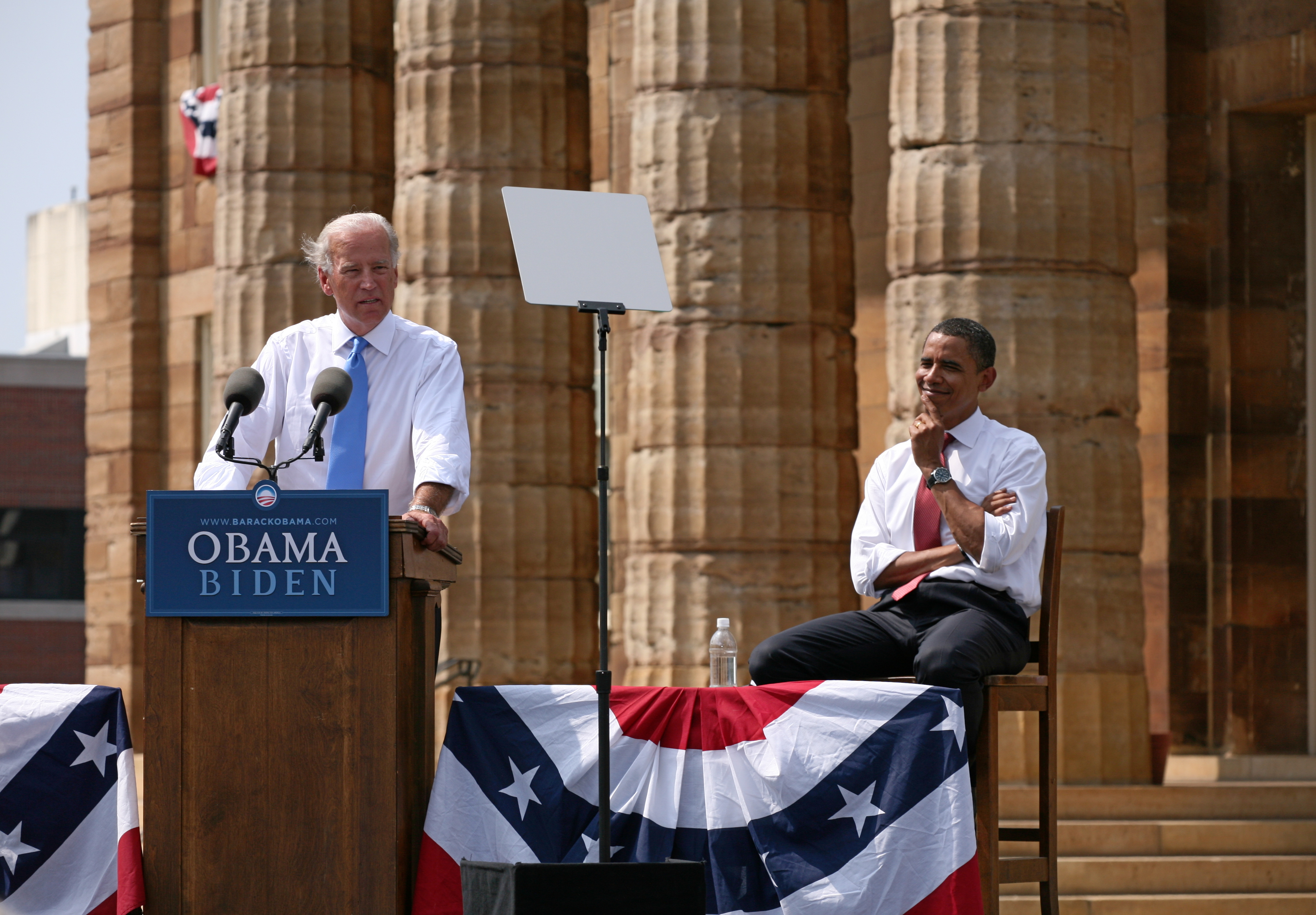
Biden speaks at the August 23, 2008, vice presidential announcement at the Old State Capitol in Springfield, Illinois.

In August 2008, Obama and Biden met in secret to discuss the possibility of a place for Biden in the Obama administration, and developed a strong personal rapport. On August 22, 2008, Obama announced that Biden would be his running mate. The New York Times reported that the choice reflected a desire for someone with foreign policy and national security experience. Others pointed out Biden's appeal to middle-class and blue-collar voters. Biden was officially nominated for vice president on August 27 at the 2008 Democratic National Convention in Denver.

Biden's vice-presidential campaigning gained little media attention, as the press devoted far more coverage to the Republican nominee, Alaska governor Sarah Palin. Under instructions from the campaign, Biden kept his speeches succinct and tried to avoid offhand remarks. Privately, Biden's remarks frustrated Obama. "How many times is Biden gonna say something stupid?", he asked. Obama campaign staffers called Biden's blunders "Joe bombs" and kept Biden uninformed about strategy discussions, which irked Biden. Relations between the two campaigns became strained for a month, until Biden apologized to Obama and the two built a stronger partnership.

In September 2008, during the 2008 financial crisis, Biden voted for the $700 billion Emergency Economic Stabilization Act of 2008, which passed in the Senate. On October 2, he participated in the vice-presidential debate with Palin at Washington University in St. Louis. Post-debate polls found that while Palin exceeded many voters' expectations, Biden had still won the debate overall. On November 4, Obama and Biden were elected.

As Biden was running for vice president, he was also running for reelection to the Senate, as permitted by Delaware law. Having been reelected to the Senate as well as the vice presidency, Biden made a point of not resigning from the Senate before he was sworn in for his seventh term in January 2009. He resigned from the Senate on January 15.

== First term (2009–2013) ==
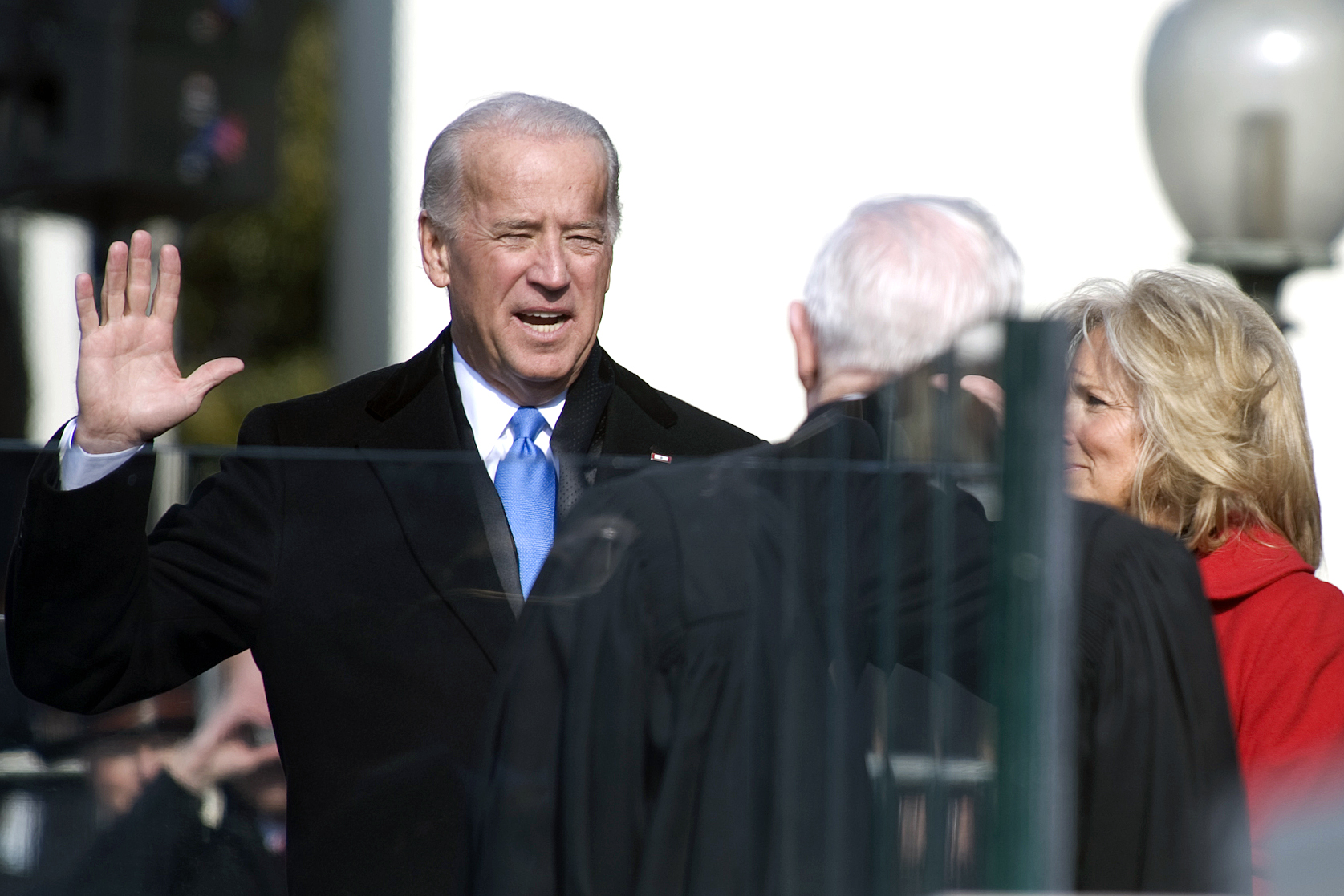
Biden being sworn in as vice president by Supreme Court Justice John Paul Stevens on January 20, 2009

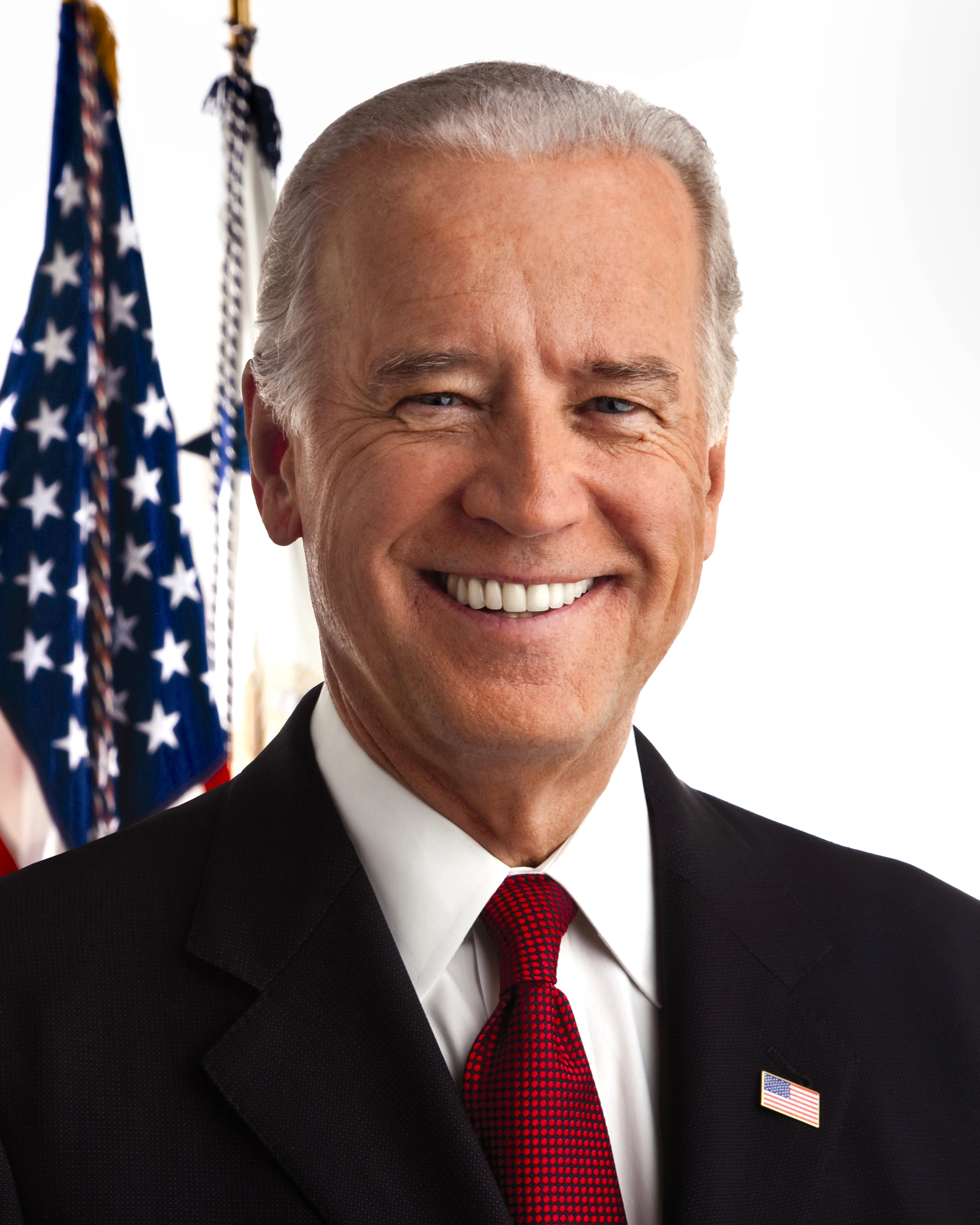
Official portrait, 2009

Biden's vice presidency succeeded the Vice presidency of Dick Cheney, which was controversial. Biden said he intended to eliminate some explicit roles assumed by George W. Bush's vice president, Dick Cheney, and did not intend to emulate any previous vice presidency. He was sworn in on January 20, 2009. He was the first vice president from Delaware and the first Roman Catholic vice president. Members of the Obama administration said Biden's role in the White House was to be a contrarian and force others to defend their positions. Rahm Emanuel, White House chief of staff, said that Biden helped counter groupthink. The Bidens maintained a relaxed atmosphere at their official residence in Washington, often entertaining their grandchildren, and regularly returned to their home in Delaware.

Biden visited Kosovo in May and affirmed the U.S. position that its "independence is irreversible". Biden lost an internal debate to Secretary of State Hillary Clinton about sending 21,000 new troops to Afghanistan, but his skepticism was valued, and in 2009, Biden's views gained more influence as Obama reconsidered his Afghanistan strategy. Biden visited Iraq about every two months, becoming the administration's point man in delivering messages to Iraqi leadership about expected progress there. More generally, overseeing Iraq policy became Biden's responsibility. By 2012, Biden had made eight trips there, but his oversight of U.S. policy in Iraq receded with the exit of U.S. troops in 2011.

Biden oversaw infrastructure spending from the Obama stimulus package intended to help counteract the ongoing recession. When he completed that role in February 2011, he said the number of fraud incidents with stimulus monies had been less than one percent.

Biden's off-message response to a question in April 2009, during the beginning of the swine flu outbreak, led to a swift retraction by the White House. The remark revived Biden's reputation for gaffes. Confronted with rising unemployment through July 2009, Biden acknowledged that the administration had "misread how bad the economy was", but maintained confidence the stimulus package would create many more jobs once the pace of expenditures picked up. A hot mic picked up Biden telling Obama that his signing the Patient Protection and Affordable Care Act was "a big fucking deal" on March 23, 2010. Despite their different personalities, Obama and Biden formed a friendship, partly based around Obama's daughter Sasha and Biden's granddaughter Maisy, who attended Sidwell Friends School together.

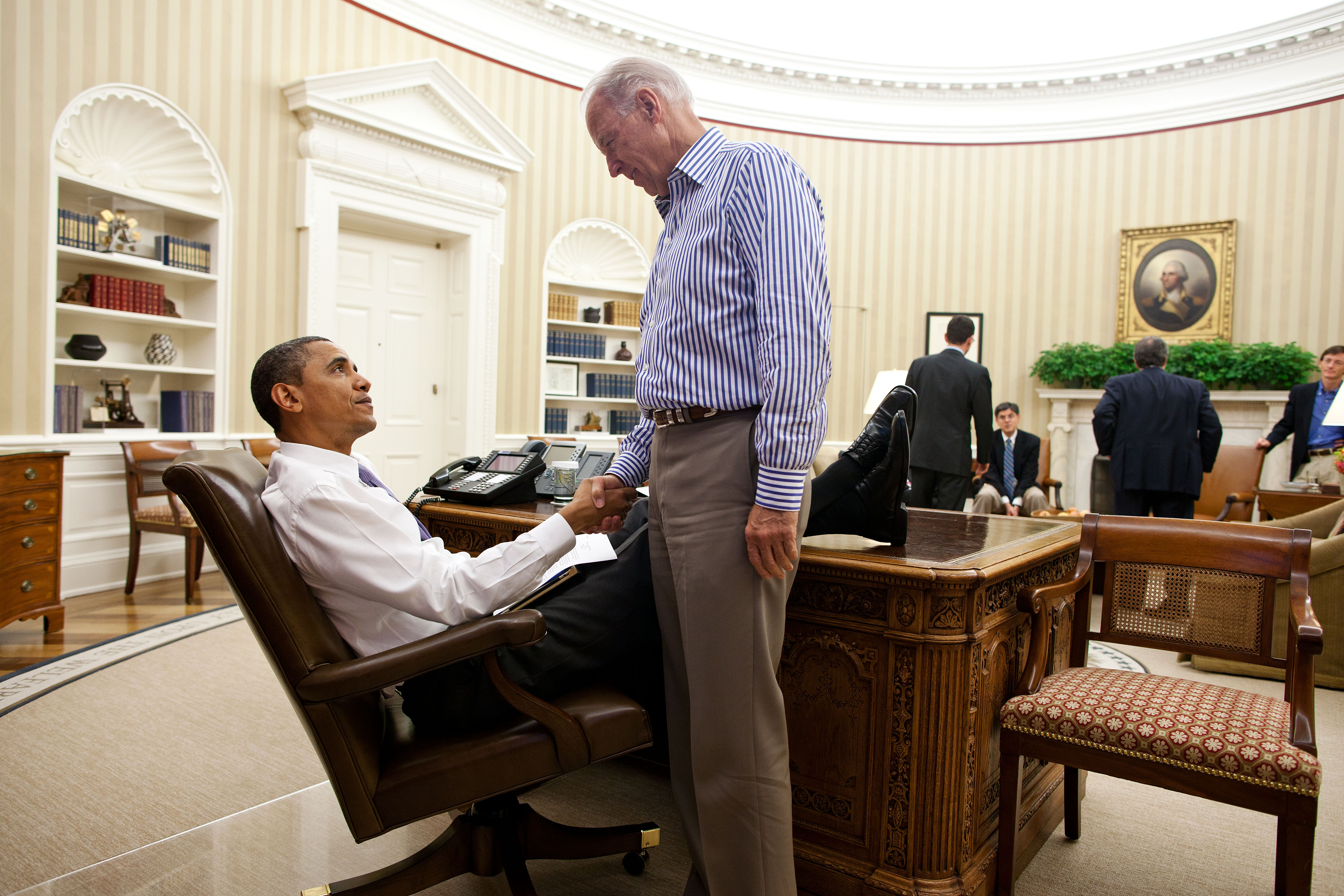
President Obama congratulates Biden for his role in shaping the debt ceiling deal which led to the Budget Control Act of 2011.

Due to the large Democratic majority in Congress, Biden became the first vice president since Dan Quayle to cast zero tie-breaking votes as President of the Senate. Biden campaigned heavily for Democrats in the 2010 midterm elections, maintaining an attitude of optimism in the face of predictions of large-scale losses for the party. Following big Republican gains in the elections and the departure of Emanuel, Biden's past relationships with Republicans in Congress became more important. He led the successful administration effort to gain Senate approval for the New START treaty. In December 2010, Biden's advocacy for a middle ground, followed by his negotiations with Senate minority leader Mitch McConnell, were instrumental in producing the administration's compromise tax package that included a temporary extension of the Bush tax cuts. The package passed as the Tax Relief, Unemployment Insurance Reauthorization, and Job Creation Act of 2010.

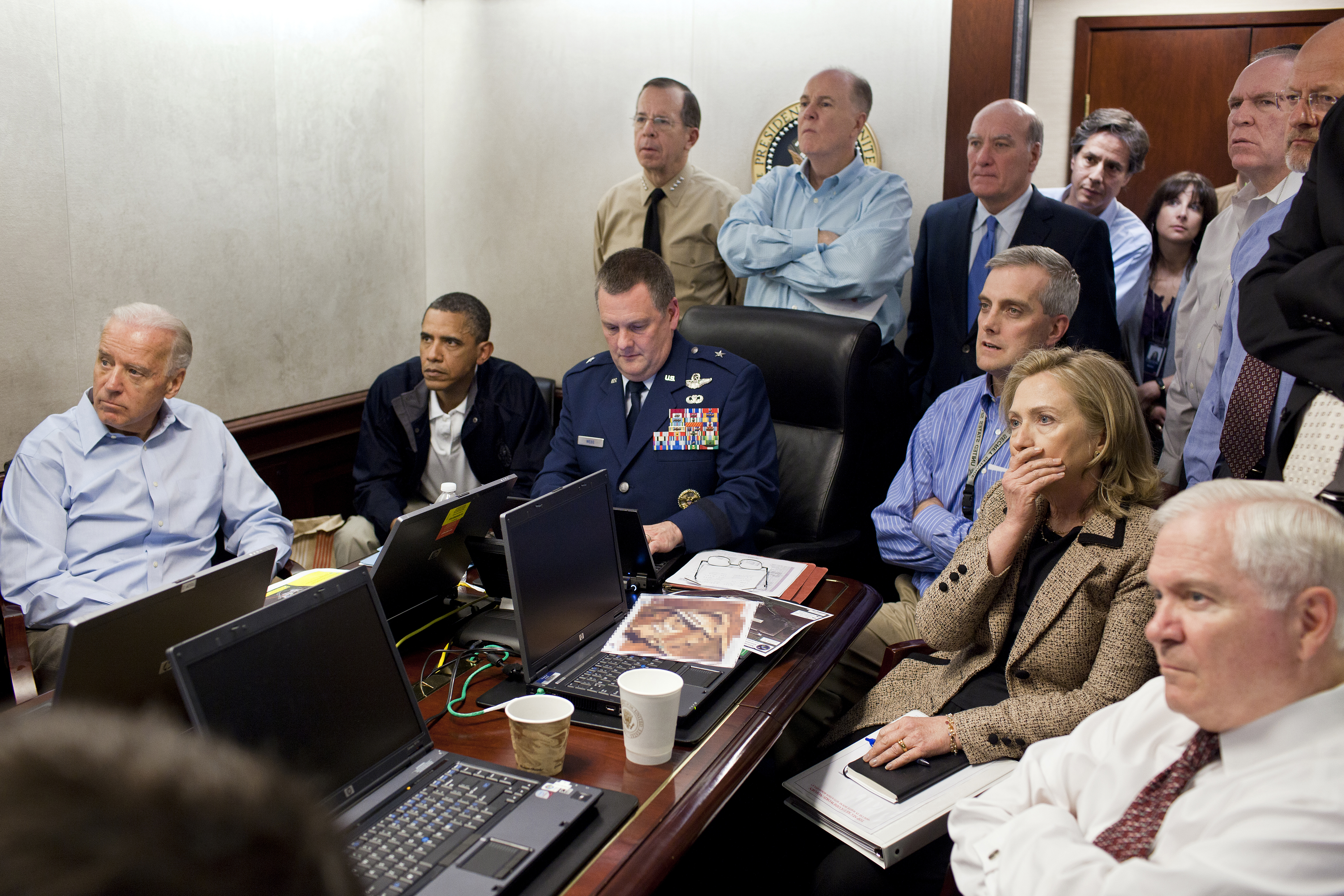
Biden, Obama and the national security team gathered in the White House Situation Room to monitor the progress of the May 2011 mission to kill Osama bin Laden.

Obama delegated Biden to lead negotiations with Congress in March 2011 to resolve federal spending levels and avoid a government shutdown. The U.S. debt ceiling crisis developed over the next few months, but Biden's relationship with McConnell again proved key in bringing about a deal to resolve it, in the form of the Budget Control Act of 2011. Some reports suggest that Biden opposed proceeding with the May 2011 U.S. mission to kill Osama bin Laden, lest failure adversely affect Obama's reelection prospects.

Obama named Biden to head the Gun Violence Task Force, created to address the causes of school shootings and consider possible gun control measures in the aftermath of the Sandy Hook Elementary School shooting, in December 2012. Later that month, during the final days before the United States fell off the "fiscal cliff", Biden's relationship with McConnell again proved important as the two negotiated a deal that led to the American Taxpayer Relief Act of 2012 being passed at the start of 2013.

== 2012 vice presidential campaign ==
In a May 2012 Meet the Press interview, Vice President Biden reversed his previous position and publicly supported same-sex marriage, saying he was "absolutely comfortable with the fact that men marrying men, women marrying women, and heterosexual men and women marrying another are entitled to the same exact rights, all the civil rights, all the civil liberties. And quite frankly, I don't see much of a distinction beyond that." Prior to Biden's statement on Meet the Press, the Obama administration endorsed civil unions, but not same-sex marriage. Biden's decision reportedly forced Obama's hand, pressuring Obama to accelerate his own public shift to support same-sex marriage. In 2013, Section 3 of DOMA was ruled unconstitutional and partially struck down in United States v. Windsor. The Obama Administration did not defend the law and congratulated Windsor.

== Second term (2013–2017) ==
Biden was inaugurated to a second term on January 20, 2013, at a small ceremony at Number One Observatory Circle, his official residence, with Justice Sonia Sotomayor presiding (a public ceremony took place on January 21). He played little part in discussions that led to the October 2013 passage of the Continuing Appropriations Act, 2014, which resolved the federal government shutdown of 2013 and the debt-ceiling crisis of 2013. Senate Majority Leader Harry Reid and other Democratic leaders cut him out of direct talks with Congress, feeling Biden had given too much away during previous negotiations.

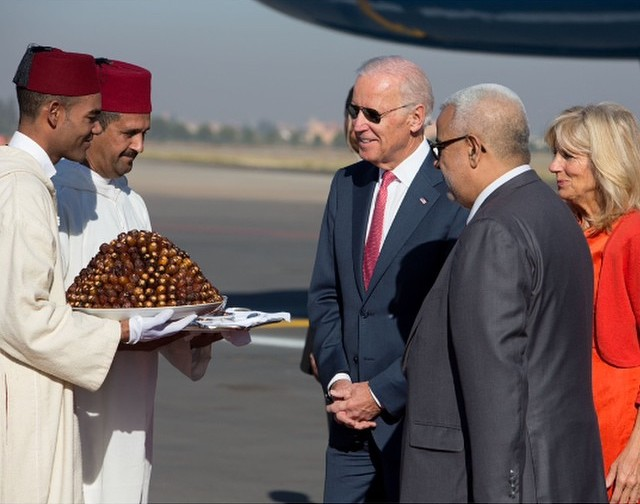
Biden in Morocco, November 2014

Biden's Violence Against Women Act was reauthorized again in 2013. The act led to related developments, such as the White House Council on Women and Girls, begun in the first term, as well as the White House Task Force to Protect Students from Sexual Assault, begun in January 2014 with Biden and Valerie Jarrett as co-chairs. He talked about sexual violence while introducing Lady Gaga at the 88th Academy Awards in 2016, receiving a standing ovation from the audience.

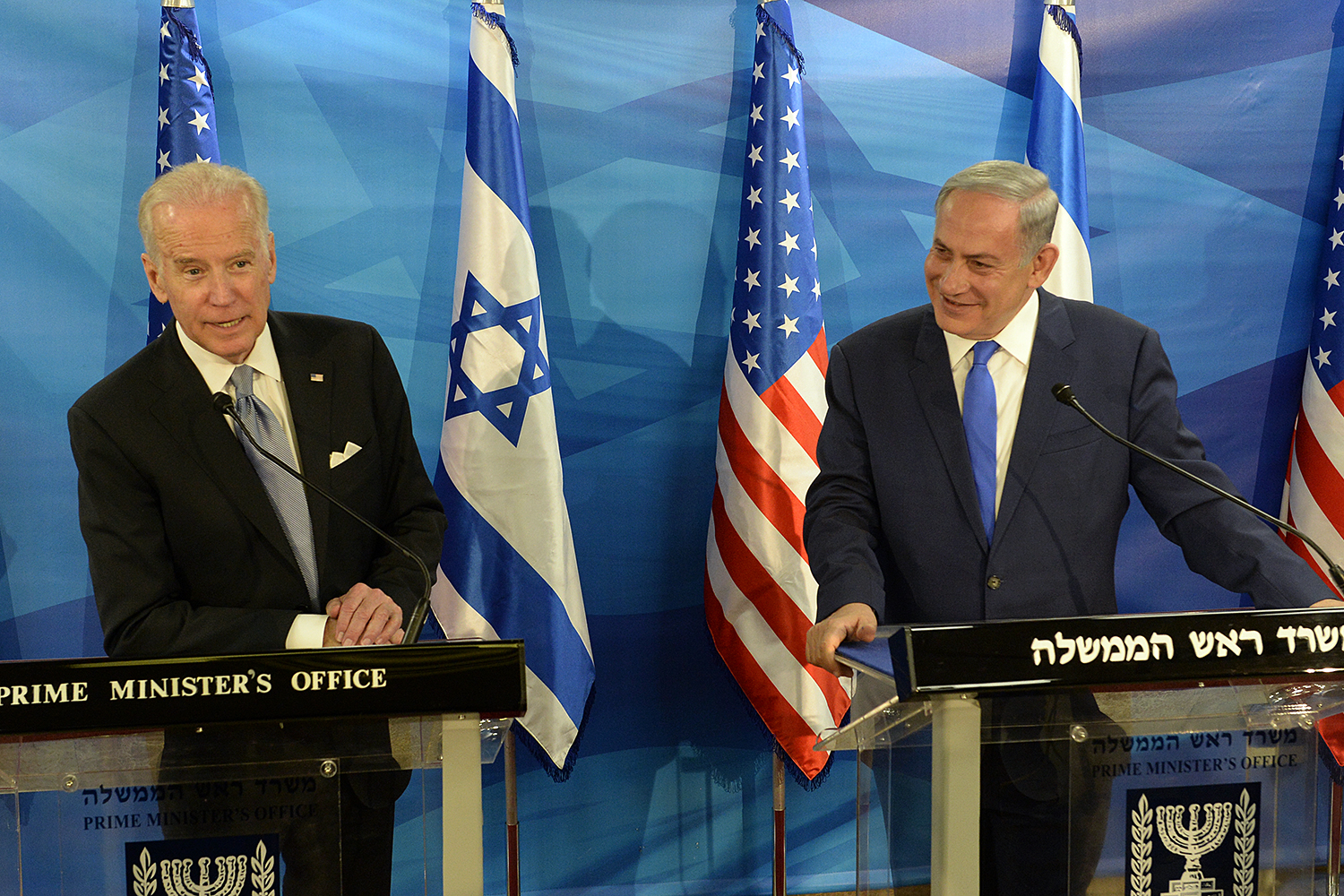
Biden with Israeli prime minister Benjamin Netanyahu in Jerusalem, March 9, 2016

Biden favored arming Syria's rebel fighters. As the ISIL insurgency in Iraq intensified in 2014, renewed attention was paid to the Biden-Gelb Iraqi federalization plan of 2006, with some observers suggesting Biden had been right all along. He had close relationships with several Latin American leaders and visited the region 16 times during his vice presidency, the most of any president or vice president. In August 2016, Biden visited Serbia, where he met with the Serbian Prime Minister Aleksandar Vučić and expressed condolences for civilian victims of the bombing campaign during the Kosovo War. Biden never cast a tie-breaking vote in the Senate, making him the longest-serving vice president with this distinction.

Biden supported the U.S. Supreme Court's 5–4 ruling in Obergefell v. Hodges (2015), which held that same-sex couples have a federal constitutional right to marry. Biden issued a statement saying that the ruling reflected a principle that "all people should be treated with respect and dignity – and that all marriages, at their root, are defined by unconditional love." In an event with the group Freedom to Marry, Biden described the decision as "the civil rights movement of our generation" and as consequential as Brown v. Board of Education. Jim Obergefell, the lead plaintiff in the case, endorsed Biden's 2020 presidential run, as did other LGBT leaders.

== 2016 presidential campaign ==
During his second term, Biden was often said to be preparing for a bid for the 2016 Democratic presidential nomination. With his family, friends, and donors encouraging him in mid-2015 to enter the race, and with Hillary Clinton's favorability ratings in decline at that time, Biden was reported to be seriously considering the prospect and a "Draft Biden 2016" PAC was established.

By late 2015, Biden was still uncertain about running. He felt his son Beau's recent death had largely drained his emotional energy, and said, "nobody has a right... to seek that office unless they're willing to give it 110% of who they are." On October 21, Biden announced his decision not to run for president in 2016.

== In popular culture ==
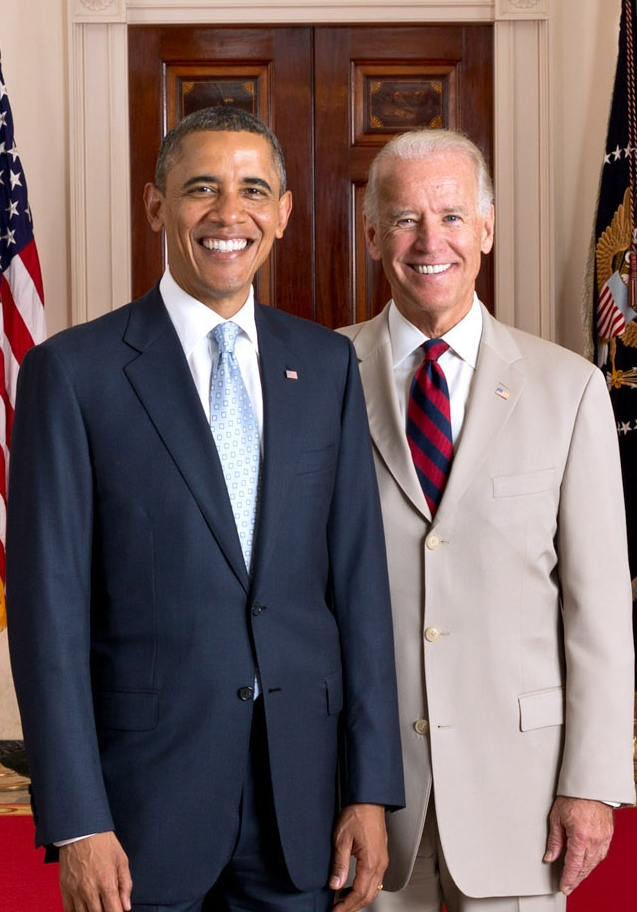
The friendly relationship between Obama and Biden shaped Biden's public image.

=== The Onion parody of Biden ===
Between 2009 and 2019, satirical newspaper The Onion consistently portrayed Biden as an outrageous character who shared almost nothing in common with his namesake besides the title of vice president of the United States. The character was also known as "Diamond Joe". The publication portrayed Biden as a blue-collar "average Joe", an affable "goofy uncle", a muscle car driver, an avid fan of 1980s hair metal, a raucous party animal, a shameless womanizer, a recidivist petty criminal, and a drug-dealing outlaw. The Onion briefly revived its fanciful version of Biden in 2019, but subsequently took its satirical coverage of him in a more critical and straightforward direction. Biden's character became one of The Onion's most popular features during the Obama presidency, garnering critical acclaim and a large readership. Despite the extreme differences between the fictional character and the real politician, The Onion was regarded as having a significant, mostly positive influence on Biden's public image. Commentators noted that the character likely reinforced public perceptions of Biden as a political figure with populist working-class appeal and a good-natured, easy-going disposition.

=== Television ===
Jason Sudeikis portrayed Biden during the 2008 United States Presidential election and has since returned to the role numerous times. In 2016, Greg Kinnear portrayed then Senator Biden in the HBO television film Confirmation about the controversial Clarence Thomas Supreme Court nomination hearings. Kerry Washington portrayed Anita Hill and Wendell Pierce played Clarence Thomas. Kinnear said he took the role because, "[Biden] is an interesting character, I understood his predicament, I understood the situation that he was in and I felt like that would be a great part to play." Brian Lowry of Variety described his performance as "uncanny". Emma Brockes of The Guardian described Kinnear as "particularly excellent". Joe McGovern of Entertainment Weekly cited his performance as being "fantastic", adding "Kinnear nails the duality of Biden’s position, attempting on one hand to maintain comity among his colleagues in the Senate while also trying, often fecklessly, to be sensitive to Hill".

== Legacy ==
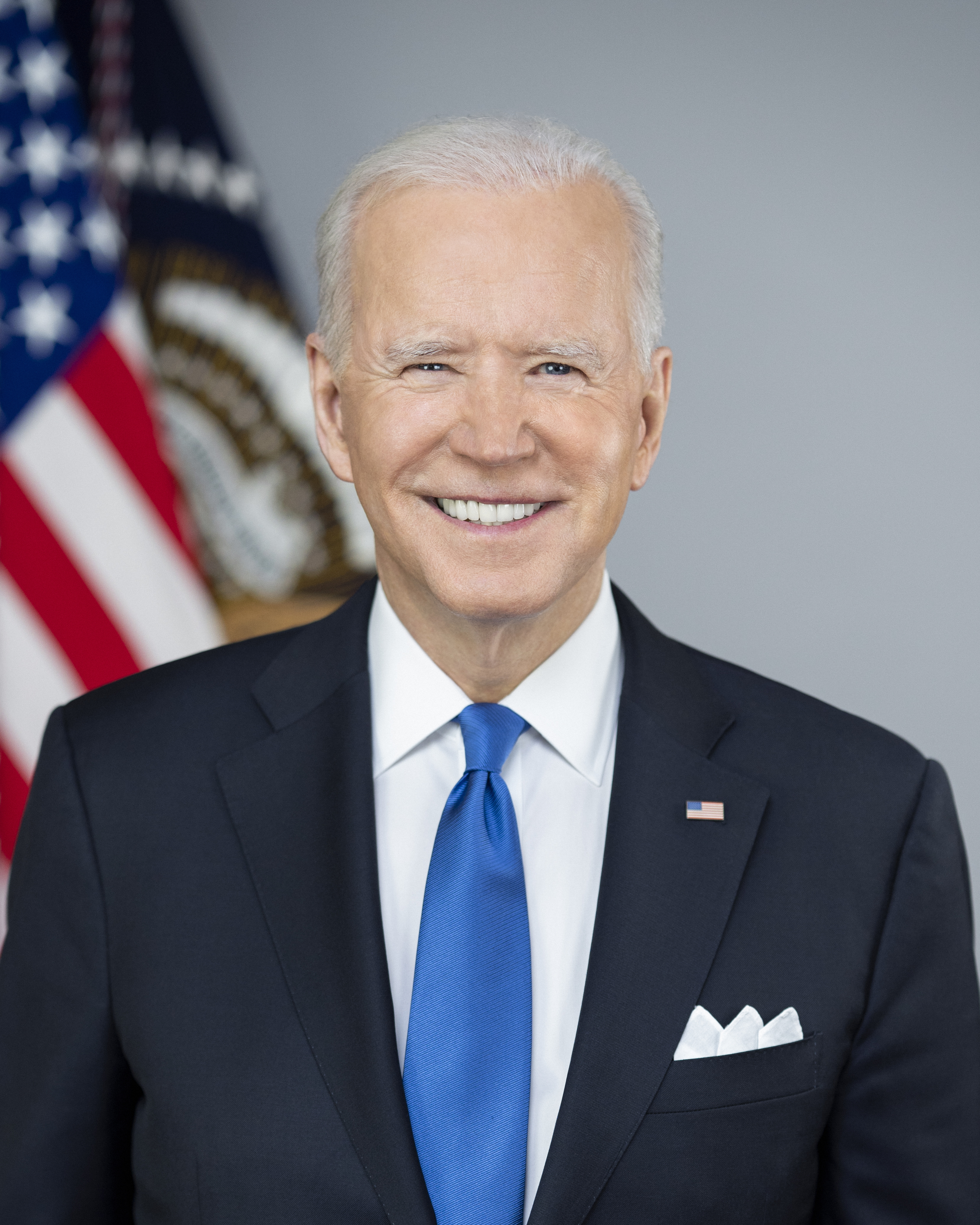
Biden's official presidential portrait, 2021

In January 2017, President Obama called Biden “the best Vice President America has ever had”. Political observers described Biden's high level of influence and effectiveness as vice president.

After leaving the vice presidency, Biden became an honorary professor at the University of Pennsylvania, developing the Penn Biden Center for Diplomacy and Global Engagement. Biden remained in that position into 2019. In 2019, Biden launched his 2020 presidential campaign. Biden selected Kamala Harris as his running mate, and they defeated Republican incumbents Donald Trump and Mike Pence in the 2020 United States presidential election, making Biden the first president to serve with a woman vice president, Black American vice president, and Asian American vice president, and the first former vice president to be elected since Richard Nixon in 1968. President Donald Trump refused to concede the election and attempted to overturn it in the January 6, 2021 United States Capitol attack. Biden was sworn in on January 20, 2021.

As president, Biden signed the American Rescue Plan Act, Infrastructure Investment and Jobs Act, CHIPS and Science Act, and Inflation Reduction Act in response to the COVID-19 pandemic and subsequent recession. He appointed Ketanji Brown Jackson to the Supreme Court of the United States. In his foreign policy, the U.S. reentered the Paris Agreement. Biden oversaw the complete withdrawal of U.S. troops that ended the war in Afghanistan, leading to the Taliban seizing control. He responded to the Russian invasion of Ukraine by imposing sanctions on Russia and authorizing aid to Ukraine. During the Gaza war, Biden condemned the actions of Hamas as terrorism, strongly supported Israel's military efforts, and sent limited humanitarian aid to the Gaza Strip. A temporary ceasefire proposal he backed was adopted shortly before he left office.

Concerns about Biden's age and health persisted throughout his term. He became the first president to turn 80 while in office. He began his presidency with majority support, but saw his approval ratings decline significantly throughout his presidency, in part due to public frustration over inflation, which peaked at 9.1% in June 2022 but dropped to 2.9% by the end of his presidency. Biden initially ran for re-election and, after the Democratic primaries, he became the party's presumptive nominee in the 2024 presidential election. After his poor performance in the first presidential debate, renewed scrutiny from across the political spectrum about his cognitive ability led him to ultimately withdraw from the race. Biden immediately endorsed Vice President Kamala Harris to replace him in his place as the party's presidential nominee. Harris subsequently became the Democratic nominee at the 2024 Democratic National Convention with Tim Walz as her running mate, but they subsequently lost the general election to Trump and JD Vance. Biden's administration is ranked favorably by historians and scholars, diverging from public assessments of his tenure. He is the oldest living former U.S. president, the oldest living former U.S. vice president, and the oldest person to have served as president.

== Elections during the Biden vice presidency ==
Congressional party leaders
		Senate leaders		House leaders	
Congress	Year	Majority	Minority	Speaker	Minority
111th	2009–2010	Reid	McConnell	Pelosi	Boehner
112th	2011–2012	Reid	McConnell	Boehner	Pelosi
113th	2013–2014	Reid	McConnell	Boehner	Pelosi
114th	2015	McConnell	Reid	Boehner	Pelosi
114th	2015–2016	McConnell	Reid	Ryan (Note: John Boehner resigned as Speaker of the House on October 29, 2015. Paul Ryan was elected to replace Boehner as Speaker of the House on October 29, 2015.)	Pelosi
115th (Note: 17 days of the 111th Congress (January 3, 2009 – January 19, 2009) took place under Vice President Cheney, and 17 days of the 115th Congress (January 3, 2017 – January 19, 2017) took place during Biden's vice presidency.)	2017	McConnell	Schumer	Ryan	Pelosi

Democratic seats in Congress (Note: Democratic seats at the start of each session of Congress. Independents caucusing with the Democratic Party (Senators Bernie Sanders, Joe Lieberman, and Angus King) are counted as Democrats for the purposes of this table. Throughout Obama's presidency, there were a total of 100 Senate seats in 435 House seats, so a Democratic majority in the Senate required 50 seats (since Democratic vice president Joe Biden could provide the tie-breaking vote), and a Democratic majority in the House required 218 seats (assuming no vacancies).)
Congress	Senate	House
111th	59 (Note: In 2009, Democrats briefly gained a "filibuster-proof" 60 Senate seats after Al Franken won an extremely close election and Arlen Specter switched parties, but the number of Senate Democrats went down to 59 seats after Scott Brown won a January 2010 special election in Massachusetts.)	257
112th	53	193
113th	55	201
114th	46	188
115th	48	194

== See also ==
- Presidency of Barack Obama
- US Senate career of Joe Biden
- Electoral history of Joe Biden
- Political positions of Joe Biden
