= John Marttila =

American political strategist

John Phillip Marttila (October 18, 1940 – November 3, 2018) was a Democratic strategist and political consultant who had advised politicians and elected officials, including Vice President Joe Biden, and Senator John Kerry. He served as a consultant for various domestic ballot initiatives and worked overseas for campaigns in Russia, Israel, Hungary and Greece. He was president of Marttila Strategies, a research firm based in Washington, D.C., and Boston.

== Professional career ==
Originally from Detroit where he was born in 1940, Marttila moved to Boston in 1970 to run Robert Drinan's campaign for the United States House of Representatives. Drinan's successful congressional bid was a landmark victory in U.S. politics, as he was the first Roman Catholic priest to be elected as a voting member of Congress and he was elected on an anti-war platform during the U.S. conflict in Vietnam.

In 1972, Marttila joined Joe Biden's campaign for the United States Senate in Delaware against Republican J. Caleb Boggs. Marttila was one of the few paid political consultants on Biden's 1972 campaign, in which advertising was primarily done through printed position papers that were hand-delivered. Marttila's company oversaw the strategy and advertising for the campaign. Biden won the election by 3,162 votes in an upset victory. Marttila continued to be a close political advisor to Biden throughout the Vice President’s career, including as a senior advisor in Biden's 2008 presidential campaign.

Marttila was a senior advisor to Senator John Kerry, both on Kerry's senatorial campaigns, as well as for his bid for U.S. president in 2004. Marttila also advised Massachusetts Governor Deval Patrick's 2006 campaign and the Archdiocese of Boston.

Marttila was the president of Marttila Strategies, a firm that specializes in strategic planning and opinion research. Much of that research focuses on health care in America. National health care clients have included IMS Health, PhRMA, The American Cancer Society, The Harvard School of Public Health, The Robert Wood Johnson Foundation and The Kaiser Family Foundation. He died on November 3, 2018, at the age of 78 from complications of prostate cancer.
