= 2002 United States Senate election in Delaware =

- November 5, 2002
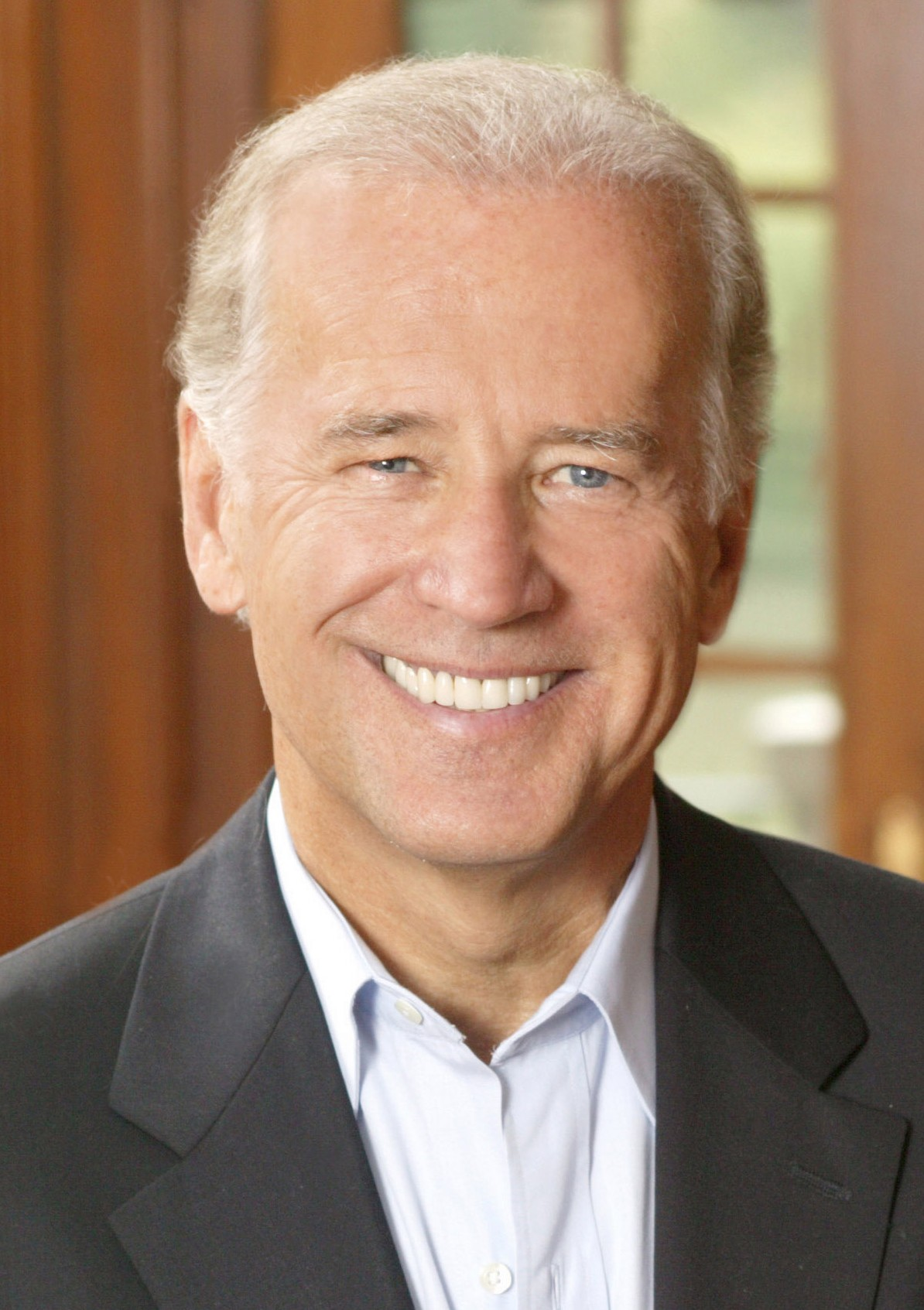

| Nominee | Joe Biden | Raymond Clatworthy |
| Party | Democratic | Republican |
| Popular vote | 135,253 | 94,793 |
| Percentage | 58.22% | 40.80% |
- Biden: 50–60% 60–70% 70–80% 80–90% Clatworthy: 50–60%
U.S. senator before election
Joe Biden
Democratic
Elected U.S. Senator
Joe Biden
Democratic

The 2002 United States Senate election in Delaware was held on November 5, 2002. Incumbent Democratic U.S. Senator Joe Biden won re-election to a sixth term, defeating Raymond Clatworthy in a rematch. This is the last Senate election that Biden decreased his percentage of the votes since the previous election and the only time Biden lost Kent County in his seven elections to the Senate.

With this election, Biden became the first senator in Delaware to win six terms and became the state's longest-serving senator.

== General Election ==
=== Candidates ===
- Joe Biden (D), incumbent Delaware senator running for a sixth consecutive term
- Raymond Clatworthy (R), businessman and nominee for the U.S. Senate in 1996
- Maurice Barros (IPoD), former department store manager.
- Raymond T. Buranello (L)
- Robert E. Mattson (NLP)

=== Predictions ===
| Source | Ranking | As of |
|---|---|---|
| Sabato's Crystal Ball | Safe D | November 4, 2002 |

=== Results ===
General election results
| Party | Candidate | Votes | % | ±% |
|---|---|---|---|---|
| Democratic | Joe Biden (incumbent) | 135,253 | 58.22% | −1.82% |
| Republican | Raymond J. Clatworthy | 94,793 | 40.80% | +2.67% |
| Independent Party | Maurice Barros | 996 | 0.43% | |
| Libertarian | Raymond T. Buranello | 922 | 0.40% | −0.82% |
| Natural Law | Robert E. Mattson | 350 | 0.15% | −0.47% |
| Majority | | 40,460 | 17.42% | −4.49% |
| Turnout | | 232,314 | | |
| Democratic hold | | Swing | | |

==== County results ====
| County | Joseph Robinette Biden Jr. Democratic | | Raymond J. Clatworthy Republican | | Maurice Barros Delaware Independent | | Raymond T. Buranello Libertarian | | Robert E. Mattson Natural Law | | Total votes cast |
| County | # | % | # | % | # | % | # | % | # | % | Total votes cast |
|---|---|---|---|---|---|---|---|---|---|---|---|
| Kent | 16,786 | 48.82% | 17,310 | 50.35% | 158 | 0.46% | 99 | 0.29% | 27 | 0.08% | 34,380 |
| New Castle | 91,554 | 63.02% | 52,129 | 35.88% | 711 | 0.49% | 621 | 0.43% | 265 | 0.18% | 145,280 |
| Sussex | 26,830 | 51.11% | 25,277 | 48.15% | 215 | 0.41% | 112 | 0.21% | 58 | 0.11% | 52,492 |
| Total | 135,253 | 58.22% | 94,793 | 40.80% | 996 | 0.43% | 922 | 0.40% | 350 | 0.15% | 232,152 |

==== Counties that flipped from Democratic to Republican ====
- Kent (largest city: Dover)

== See also ==
- 2002 United States Senate election
