= Iowa's 69th House of Representatives district =

American legislative district

House District 69
- Type: District of the Lower house
- Location: Iowa
- Representative: Tom Determann
- Parent organization: Iowa General Assembly

The 69th District of the Iowa House of Representatives in the state of Iowa. It is currently composed of part of Clinton County.

== Current elected officials ==
Tom Determann is the representative currently representing the district.

== Past representatives ==
The district has previously been represented by:

- Arthur A. Small, 1971–1973
- Norman Roorda, 1973–1975
- Robert T. Anderson, 1975–1983
- Robert J. Grandia, 1983–1987
- David F. Schrader, 1987–1993
- John Connors, 1993–2003
- Kent A. Kramer, 2003–2005
- Walt Tomenga, 2005–2009
- Erik Helland, 2009–2013
- Kirsten Running-Marquardt, 2013–2023
- Tom Determann, 2023–2027
- Randy Meier, 2027
