= List of United States Democratic Party presidential candidates =

This list details the major Democratic Party candidates who ran in presidential primaries and caucuses. Candidates are included if they were considered major contenders during the primaries and caucuses, had held significant elective office, received substantial media coverage, or received at least one delegate at the nominating convention.

The Democratic Party emerged following the dissolution of the Democratic-Republican Party in the 1820s and has nominated a presidential candidate in every presidential election since the party's first convention in 1832.

The list is divided into two sections, reflecting the increasing importance of primaries and caucuses following the changes stemming from the McGovern–Fraser Commission.

== Candidates ==
=== 1832–1968 ===
N.B. Bold indicates that the candidate was nominated as the Presidential candidate

List of candidates (1832-1968)
| Year | Candidate | Born | Experience | State | First Ballot | | Final Contested Ballot (Note: Delegates won/percentage of delegates won on the final contested ballot, before shifts. A "-" indicates that there was only one contested ballot.) | | Ref. |
| Year | Candidate | Born | Experience | State | Delegates | % | Delegates | % | Ref. |
|---|---|---|---|---|---|---|---|---|---|
| 1832 | **Andrew Jackson** | 1767 | President of the United States (1829-1832) U.S. Senator from Tennessee (1823-1825) | Tennessee | N/A (Note: Jackson was not nominated through a formal vote, but instead nominated via a resolution that affirmed nominations that Jackson had received from state legislatures before the convention.) | 100 | - | - | |
| 1835 | **Martin Van Buren** | 1782 | Vice President of the United States (1833-1835) U.S. Senator from New York (1821-1828) | New York | 265 / 265 | 100 | - | - | |
| 1840 | **Martin Van Buren** | 1782 | President of the United States (1837-1841) | New York | | 100 | - | - | |
| 1844 | **James K. Polk** | 1795 | Governor of Tennessee (1839-1841) Speaker of the U.S. House of Representatives (1835-1839) | Tennessee | 0 / 266 | 0 | 231 / 266 | 86.8 | |
| 1844 | Martin Van Buren | 1782 | President of the United States (1837-1841) | New York | 146 / 266 | 54.9 | 2 / 266 | 0.7 | |
| 1844 | Lewis Cass | 1782 | Ambassador to France (1836-1842) | Michigan | 83 / 266 | 31.2 | 29 / 266 | 10.9 | |
| 1844 | Richard Mentor Johnson | 1780 | Vice President of the United States (1837-1841) | Kentucky | 24 / 266 | 9 | 0 / 266 | 0 | |
| 1844 | James Buchanan | 1791 | U.S. Senator from Pennsylvania (1834-1845) | Pennsylvania | 4 / 266 | 1.5 | 0 / 266 | 0 | |
| 1844 | John C Calhoun | 1782 | Secretary of State (1844-1845) | South Carolina | 6 / 266 | 2.3 | 2 / 266 | 0.8 | |
| 1844 | Levi Woodbury | 1789 | Secretary of the Treasury (1834-1841) | New Hampshire | 2 / 266 | 0.8 | 0 / 266 | 0 | |
| 1848 | **Lewis Cass** | 1782 | U.S. Senator from Michigan (1845-1848) | Michigan | 125 / 254 | 49.2 | 179 / 254 | 70.5 | |
| 1848 | Levi Woodbury | 1789 | Associate Supreme Court Justice (1845-1851) | New Hampshire | 53 / 254 | 20.9 | 38 / 254 | 15 | |
| 1848 | James Buchanan | 1791 | Secretary of State (1845-1849) | Pennsylvania | 55 / 254 | 21.7 | 33 / 254 | 13 | |
| 1852 | **Franklin Pierce** | 1804 | U.S. Senator from New Hampshire (1849-1857) | New Hampshire | N/A (Note: Pierce did not appear on the ballot until the 35th round.) | | 282 / 296 | 95 | |
| 1852 | Lewis Cass | 1782 | U.S. Senator from Michigan (1849-1857) | Michigan | 116 / 296 | 39.2 | 2 / 296 | 0.7 | |
| 1852 | James Buchanan | 1791 | Secretary of State (1845-1849) | Pennsylvania | 93 / 296 | 31.4 | 0 / 296 | 0 | |
| 1852 | William L. Marcy | 1786 | Secretary of War (1845-1849) | New York | 27 / 296 | 9.1 | 0 / 296 | 0 | |
| 1852 | Stephen A. Douglas | 1813 | U.S. Senator from Illinois(1847-1861) | Illinois | 20 / 296 | 6.8 | 2 / 296 | 0.7 | |
| 1856 | **James Buchanan** | 1791 | Minister to Great Britain (1853-1856) | Pennsylvania | 135.5 / 296 | 45.8 | 168 / 296 | 56.8 | |
| 1856 | Franklin Pierce | 1804 | President of the United States (1853-1857) | New Hampshire | 122.5 / 296 | 41.4 | 0 / 296 | 0 | |
| 1856 | Stephen A. Douglas | 1813 | U.S. Senator from Illinois (1847-1861) | Illinois | 33 / 296 | 11.1 | 122 / 296 | 41.2 | |
| 1860 | **Stephen A. Douglas** (Note: Southern Democrats boycotted the Democratic convention and nominated Breckinridge instead.) | 1813 | U.S. Senator from Illinois(1847-1861) | Illinois | 145.5 / 253 | 57.5 | 151.5 / 253 | 59.9 (Note: The 1860 convention required 59 ballots over two conventions to determine the nominee after Southern delegates walked out; this column represents the 57th ballot, after which the first convention adjourned.) | |
| 1860 | James Guthrie | 1792 | Secretary of the Treasury (1853-1857) | Kentucky | 41.5 / 253 | 14.1 | 65.5 / 253 | 26 | |
| 1860 | Robert M. T. Hunter | 1809 | U.S. Senator from Virginia (1847-1861) | Virginia | 25 / 253 | 16.7 | 16 / 253 | 6.3 | |
| 1864 | **George B. McClellan** | 1826 | Major General | New Jersey | 202.5 / 226 (Note: The first ballot of the 1864 DNC was revised after Horatio Seymour broke away from the Copperhead faction of Peace Democrats.) | 89.6 | - | - | |
| 1864 | Thomas H. Seymour | 1807 | Governor of Connecticut (1850-1853) | Connecticut | 23.5 / 226 | 10.4 | - | - | |
| 1868 | **Horatio Seymour** | 1810 | Governor of New York (1853-1854; 1863-1864) | New York | 0 / 317 | 0 | 22 / 317 | 6.9 | |
| 1868 | George H. Pendleton | 1825 | U.S. Representative from Ohio (1857–1865) | Ohio | 105 / 317 | 33.1 | 0 / 317 | 0 | |
| 1868 | Thomas A. Hendricks | 1819 | U.S. Senator from Indiana (1863-1869) | Indiana | 2.5 / 317 | 0.8 | 145.5 / 317 | 45.9 | |
| 1868 | Winfield Scott Hancock | 1824 | Major General | Pennsylvania | 33.5 / 317 | 10.6 | 103.5 / 317 | 32.6 | |
| 1868 | Andrew Johnson | 1808 | President of the United States (1865-1869) | Tennessee | 65 / 317 | 20.5 | 4 / 317 | 1.3 | |
| 1868 | Sanford E. Church | 1815 | Lieutenant Governor of New York (1851-1854) | New York | 34 / 317 | 10.7 | 0 / 317 | 0 | |
| 1872 | **Horace Greeley** | 1811 | U.S. Representative | New York | | 93.7 | - | - | |
| 1876 | **Samuel J. Tilden** | 1814 | Governor | New York | | 54.4 | - | - | |
| 1876 | Thomas A. Hendricks | 1819 | Governor | Indiana | | 19 | | 11.5 | |
| 1876 | Winfield Scott Hancock | 1824 | General | Pennsylvania | | 10.2 | | 7.9 | |
| 1880 | **Winfield Scott Hancock** | 1824 | General | Pennsylvania | | 23.1 | | | |
| 1880 | Thomas F. Bayard | 1828 | Senator | Delaware | | 20.8 | | 15.2 | |
| 1880 | Samuel J. Randall | 1828 | Speaker | Pennsylvania | | 0.8 | | 17.4 | |
| 1880 | Henry B. Payne | 18 | U.S. Representative | New York | | 11 | | 0 | |
| 1884 | **Grover Cleveland** | 1837 | Governor | New York | | 64 | | | |
| 1884 | Thomas F. Bayard | 1828 | Senator | Delaware | | 27.8 | | 24.8 | |
| 1884 | Allen G. Thurman | 1813 | U.S. Senator | Ohio | | 14.4 | | 9.8 | |
| 1884 | Samuel J. Randall | 1828 | U.S. Speaker | Pennsylvania | | 10 | | 0.7 | |
| 1888 | **Grover Cleveland** | 1837 | President of the United States | New York | | 100 | - | - | |
| 1892 | **Grover Cleveland** | 1837 | President of the United States | New York | | 67.8 | - | - | |
| 1892 | David B. Hill | 18 | Senator | New York | | 12.5 | - | - | |
| 1892 | Horace Boies | 18 | Governor | Iowa | | 11.3 | - | - | |
| 1896 | **William Jennings Bryan** | 1860 | U.S. Representative | Nebraska | | 14.7 | | | |
| 1896 | Richard P. Bland | 1835 | U.S. Representative | Missouri | | 25.3 | | 1.2 | |
| 1896 | Robert E. Pattison | 18 | Governor | Pennsylvania | | 10.4 | | 10.2 | |
| 1900 | **William Jennings Bryan** | 1860 | U.S. Representative | Nebraska | | 100 | - | - | |
| 1904 | **Alton Parker** | 1852 | Chief Judge | New York | | 65.8 | - | - | |
| 1904 | William Randolph Hearst | 1863 | Representative | New York | | 20 | - | - | |
| 1908 | **William Jennings Bryan** | 1860 | U.S. Representative | Nebraska | | 88.7 | - | - | |
| 1912 | **Woodrow Wilson** | 1856 | Governor | New York | | 29.8 | | | |
| 1912 | Champ Clark | 1850 | Speaker | Missouri | | 40.5 | | 7.7 | |
| 1912 | Judson Harmon | 1846 | Governor | Ohio | | 13.6 | | 1.1 | |
| 1912 | Oscar Underwood | 1862 | Representative | Alabama | | 10.8 | | 0 | |
| 1916 | **Woodrow Wilson** | 1856 | President of the United States | New Jersey | | 100 | - | - | |
| 1920 | **James M. Cox** | 1870 | Governor | Ohio | | 12.7 | | | |
| 1920 | William Gibbs McAdoo | 1863 | U.S. Secretary of the Treasury | California | | 25.1 | | 25.5 | |
| 1920 | A. Mitchell Palmer | 1872 | Attorney General | Pennsylvania | | 24.2 | | 0.1 | |
| 1920 | Al Smith | 1873 | Governor | New York | | 10.3 | | 0 | |
| 1924 | **John W. Davis** | 1873 | U.S. Ambassador | West Virginia | | 2.8 | | 18.7 (Note: The 1924 convention required 103 ballots to determine the nominee; this column represents the 100th ballot.) | |
| 1924 | William Gibbs McAdoo | 1863 | U.S. Secretary of the Treasury | California | | 39.4 | | 17.5 | |
| 1924 | Al Smith | 1873 | Governor | New York | | 30.4 | | 32.4 | |
| 1928 | **Al Smith** | 1873 | Governor | New York | | 77.2 | - | - | |
| 1932 | **Franklin D. Roosevelt** | 1882 | Governor | New York | | 57.7 | | | |
| 1932 | Al Smith | 1873 | Governor | New York | | 17.5 | | 16.5 | |
| 1936 | **Franklin D. Roosevelt** | 1882 | President of the United States | New York | | 100 | - | - | |
| 1940 | **Franklin D. Roosevelt** | 1882 | President of the United States | New York | | 86.3 | - | - | |
| 1944 | **Franklin D. Roosevelt** | 1882 | President of the United States | New York | | 92.4 | - | - | |
| 1948 | **Harry S. Truman** | 1884 | President of the United States | Missouri | | 75 | - | - | |
| 1948 | Richard Russell, Jr. | 1897 | Senator | Georgia | | 21.6 | - | - | |
| 1952 | **Adlai Stevenson II** | 1900 | Governor | Illinois | | 10.2 | | | |
| 1952 | Estes Kefauver | 1903 | Senator | Tennessee | | 24.4 | | 22.7 | |
| 1952 | Richard Russell, Jr. | 1897 | Senator | Georgia | | 21.7 | | 21.3 | |
| 1952 | W. Averell Harriman | 1891 | U.S. Ambassador | New York | | 10.2 | | 0 | |
| 1956 | **Adlai Stevenson II** | 1900 | Governor | Illinois | | 65.9 | - | - | |
| 1956 | W. Averell Harriman | 1891 | Governor | New York | | 15.3 | - | - | |
| 1960 | **John F. Kennedy** | 1917 | Senator | Massachusetts | | 52.9 | - | - | |
| 1960 | Lyndon B. Johnson | 1908 | Senator | Texas | | 26.8 | - | - | |
| 1964 | **Lyndon B. Johnson** | 1908 | President of the United States | Texas | | 100 | - | - | |
| 1968 | **Hubert Humphrey** | 1911 | Vice President of the United States | Minnesota | | 67.5 | - | - | |
| 1968 | Eugene McCarthy | 1916 | Senator | Minnesota | | 23.1 | - | - | |

=== 1972–present ===
List of candidates
| Year | No | Candidate | Born (Note: Age provided is the age at the subsequent Convention.) | Experience | State | Primaries | | | | Ref. |
| Year | No | Candidate | Born | Experience | State | Logo | Delegates | Contests won (Note: The number of state and territorial primaries won by the candidate.) | % of delegates | Ref. |
|---|---|---|---|---|---|---|---|---|---|---|
| 1972 | 30 | **George McGovern** | 1922 | U.S. Senator from South Dakota (1963-1981) | South Dakota | | 1,319.55 / 3,014 | 11 | | |
| 1972 | – | George Wallace | 1919 | Governor of Alabama (1963-1967; 1971-1979; 1983-1987) | Alabama | | 371 / 3,014 | 6 | | |
| 1972 | – | Hubert Humphrey | 1911 | Vice President of the United States (1965-1969) | Minnesota | | 345.85 / 3,014 | 4 | | |
| 1972 | – | Edmund Muskie | 1914 | Senator | Maine | | 172.5 / 3,014 | 3 | | |
| 1972 | – | Henry M. Jackson | 1912 | Senator | Washington | | 52 / 3,014 | 0 | | |
| 1972 | – | Terry Sanford | 1917 | F. Governor | North Carolina | | 28 / 3,014 | 0 | | |
| 1972 | – | John Lindsay | 1921 | Mayor | New York | | 6 / 3,014 | 0 | | |
| 1972 | – | Walter Fauntroy | 1933 | Delegate | District of Columbia | | | 1 | | |
| 1972 | – | Shirley Chisholm | 1924 | Representative | New York | | 22 / 3,014 | 0 | | |
| 1972 | – | Eugene McCarthy | 1916 | F. Senator | Minnesota | | | 0 | | |
| 1976 | 31 | **Jimmy Carter** | 1924 | F. Governor | Georgia | | | 30 | | |
| 1976 | – | Jerry Brown | 1938 | Governor | California | | | 3 | | |
| 1976 | – | George Wallace | 1919 | Governor | Alabama | | | 3 | | |
| 1976 | – | Mo Udall | 1922 | Senator | Arizona | | | 3 | | |
| 1976 | – | Henry M. Jackson | 1912 | Senator | Washington | | | 4 | | |
| 1976 | – | Frank Church | 1924 | Senator | Idaho | | | 5 | | |
| 1976 | – | Robert Byrd | 1917 | Senator | West Virginia | | | 1 | | |
| 1976 | – | Birch Bayh | 1928 | Senator | Indiana | | | 0 | | |
| 1976 | – | Lloyd Bentsen | 1921 | Senator | Texas | | | 0 | | |
| 1976 | – | Walter Fauntroy | 1933 | Delegate | District of Columbia | | | 0 | | |
| 1976 | – | Fred R. Harris | 1930 | F. Senator | Oklahoma | | | 0 | | |
| 1976 | – | Sargent Shriver | 1915 | F. Ambassador | Maryland | | | 0 | | |
| 1980 | (31) | **Jimmy Carter** | 1924 | President of the United States (1977-1981) | Georgia | | | 36 | | |
| 1980 | - | Ted Kennedy | 1932 | U.S. Senator from Massachusetts(1963-1981) | Massachusetts | | | 12 | | |
| 1980 | - | Jerry Brown | 1938 | Governor of California (1975-1983) | California | | | 0 | | |
| 1980 | - | Cliff Finch | 1927 | Governor | MS | | | 0 | | |
| 1984 | 32 | Walter Mondale | 1928 | F. Vice President | MN | | | 21 | | |
| 1984 | - | Gary Hart | 1936 | Senator | CO | | | 26 | | |
| 1984 | - | Jesse Jackson | 1941 | Minister | Illinois | | | 3 | | |
| 1984 | - | John Glenn | 1921 | Senator | Ohio | | | 0 | | |
| 1984 | - | George McGovern | 1922 | F. Senator | SD | | | 0 | | |
| 1984 | - | Reubin Askew | 1928 | F. Governor | FL | | | 0 | | |
| 1984 | - | Alan Cranston | 1914 | Senator | California | | | 0 | | |
| 1984 | - | Ernest Hollings | 1922 | Senator | SC | | | 0 | | |
| 1988 | 33 | Michael Dukakis | 1933 | Governor | MA | | | 31 | | |
| 1988 | - | Jesse Jackson | 1941 | Minister | Illinois | | | 14 | | |
| 1988 | - | Al Gore | 1948 | Senator | Tennessee | | | 7 | | |
| 1988 | - | Dick Gephardt | 1941 | Representative | MO | | | 3 | | |
| 1988 | - | Paul Simon | 1928 | Senator | Illinois | | | 1 | | |
| 1988 | - | Gary Hart | 1936 | F. Senator | CO | | | 0 | | |
| 1988 | - | Bruce Babbitt | 1938 | F. Governor | AZ | | | 0 | | |
| 1992 | 34 | **Bill Clinton** | August 19, 1946 (age 45) Hope, Arkansas | Governor of Arkansas(1979–1981, 1983–1992) | Arkansas | | | 37 | 78.6% | |
| 1992 | - | **Jerry Brown** | April 7, 1938 (age 54) San Francisco, California | Governor of California(1975–1983) | California | – | | 6 | 13.9% | |
| 1992 | - | **Paul Tsongas** | February 14, 1941 (age 51) Lowell, Massachusetts | U.S. Senator from Massachusetts (1979–1985) | Massachusetts | | | 9 | 6.7% | |
| 1992 | - | **Bob Kerrey** | August 27, 1943 (age 48) Lincoln, Nebraska | U.S. Senator from Nebraska (1989–2001) | Nebraska | | | 1 | 0% | |
| 1992 | - | **Tom Harkin** | August 27, 1943 (age 48) Cumming, Iowa | U.S. Senator from Iowa (1985–2015) | Iowa | | | 3 | 0% | |
| 1992 | - | **Larry Agran** | February 2, 1945 (age 47) Chicago, Illinois | Mayor of Irvine, California (1982–1984, 1986–1990) | California | – | | 0 | 0.07% | |
| 1996 | (34) | **Bill Clinton** | August 19, 1946 (age 50) Hope, Arkansas | President of the United States (1993–2001) | Arkansas | | | 34 | 99.7% | |
| 1996 | - | **Roland Riemers** | May 15, 1943 (age 53) Lake City, Minnesota | Republican primary candidate for 1976 United States Senate election in Minnesota | North Dakota | – | | 1 | 0% | |
| 1996 | - | **Lyndon LaRouche** | September 8, 1922 (age 73) Rochester, New Hampshire | Perennial candidate for President in 1976, 1980, 1984, 1988 and 1992 elections. | Virginia | – | | 0 | 0% | |
| 1996 | - | **James D. Griffin** | June 29, 1929 (age 67) Buffalo, New York | Mayor of Buffalo (1978–1993) | New York | – | | 0 | 0% | |
| 2000 | 35 | **Al Gore** | March 31, 1948 (age 52); Washington, D.C. | Vice President of the United States (1993–2001) | Tennessee | | | 56 | 99.8% | |
| 2000 | – | **Bill Bradley** | July 28, 1943 (age 57); Crystal City, Missouri | U.S. Senator from New Jersey (1979–1997) | New Jersey | | | 0 | 0% | |
| 2004 | 36 | **John Kerry** | December 11, 1943 (age 60); Aurora, Colorado | U.S. Senator from Massachusetts (1985–2013) | Massachusetts | | | 52 | 98.4% | |
| 2004 | - | **John Edwards** | June 10, 1953 (age 51); Seneca, South Carolina | U.S. Senator from North Carolina (1999–2005) | North Carolina | | | 2 | 0% | |
| 2004 | - | **Howard Dean** | November 17, 1948 (age 55); East Hampton, New York | Former Governor of Vermont (1991–2003) | Vermont | | | 1 | 0% | |
| 2004 | - | **Wesley Clark** | December 23, 1944 (age 59); Chicago, Illinois | Supreme Allied Commander Europe (1997–2000) | Arkansas | | | 1 | 0% | |
| 2004 | - | **Dennis Kucinich** | October 8, 1946 (age 57); Cleveland, Ohio | U.S. Representative from Ohio (1997–2013) | Ohio | | | 0 | 1% | |
| 2004 | - | **Al Sharpton** | October 3, 1954 (age 49); New York City | Activist and television host | New York | | | 0 | 0% | |
| 2004 | - | **Joe Lieberman** | February 24, 1942 (age 62); Stamford, Connecticut | U.S. Senator from Connecticut (1989–2013) | Connecticut | | | 0 | 0% | |
| 2004 | - | **Dick Gephardt** | January 31, 1941 (age 63); St. Louis, Missouri | House Minority Leader (1995–2003) | Missouri | | | 0 | 0% | |
| 2004 | - | **Carol Moseley Braun** | August 16, 1947 (age 56); Chicago, Illinois | Former U.S. Senator from Illinois (1993–1999) | Illinois | | | 0 | 0% | |
| 2008 | 37 | **Barack Obama** | August 4, 1961 (age 47); Honolulu, Hawaii | U.S. Senator from Illinois (2005–2008) | Illinois | | | 33 | 72.2% | |
| 2008 | - | **Hillary Clinton** | October 26, 1947 (age 60); Chicago, Illinois | First Lady of the United States (1993–2001) U.S. Senator from New York (2001–2009) | New York | | | 23 | 22.9% | |
| 2008 | - | **John Edwards** | June 10, 1953 (age 55); Seneca, South Carolina | U.S. Senator from North Carolina (1999–2005) | North Carolina | | | 0 | 0% | |
| 2008 | - | **Bill Richardson** | November 15, 1947 (age 60); Pasadena, California | 30thGovernor of New Mexico (2003–2011) | New Mexico | | | 0 | 0% | |
| 2008 | - | **Joe Biden** | November 20, 1942 (age 65); Scranton, Pennsylvania | U.S. Senator from Delaware (1973–2009); Candidate for President in 1988 and 2008 | Delaware | | | 0 | 0% | |
| 2008 | - | **Chris Dodd** | May 27, 1944 (age 64); Willimantic, Connecticut | U.S. Senator from Connecticut (1981–2011) | Connecticut | | | 0 | 0% | |
| 2008 | - | **Mike Gravel** | May 13, 1930 (age 78); Springfield, Massachusetts | U.S. Senator from Alaska (1969–1981) | Alaska | | | 0 | 0% | |
| 2008 | - | **Dennis Kucinich** | October 8, 1946 (age 61); Cleveland, Ohio | U.S. Representative for Ohio's 10th (1997–2013) | Ohio | | | 0 | 0% | |
| 2012 | (37) | **Barack Obama** | August 4, 1961 (age 51); Honolulu, Hawaii | President of the United States (2009–2017) | Illinois | | | 56 | 100% | |
| 2012 | - | **John Wolfe Jr.** | April 21, 1954 (age 58); Nashville, Tennessee | Candidate for Tennessee's 3rd congressional district elections in 1998, 2002, 2004 and 2010 | Tennessee | | | 0 | 0% | |
| 2016 | 38 | **Hillary Clinton** | October 26, 1947 (age 68); Chicago, Illinois | 67th U.S. Secretary of State(2009–2013) | New York | | | 34 | 54% | |
| 2016 | - | **Bernie Sanders** | September 8, 1941 (age 74); Brooklyn, New York | U.S. Senator from Vermont (2007–present) | Vermont | | | 23 | 46% | |
| 2016 | - | **Martin O'Malley** | January 18, 1963 (age 53); Washington, D.C. | 61st Governor of Maryland (2007–2015) | Maryland | | | 0 | 0% | |
| 2020 | 39 | **Joe Biden** | November 20, 1942 (age 77); Scranton, Pennsylvania | Vice President of the United States (2009–2017); U.S. Senator from Delaware (1973–2009); Candidate for President in 1988 and 2008 | Delaware | | | 46 | 67.5% | |
| 2020 | - | **Bernie Sanders** | September 8, 1941 (age 78); Brooklyn, New York | U.S. Senator from Vermont (2007–present); U.S. representative from VT-AL (1991–2007); Candidate for president in 2016 and 2020 | Vermont | | | 9 | 27% | |
| 2020 | - | **Elizabeth Warren** | June 22, 1949 (age 71); Oklahoma City, Oklahoma | U.S. Senator from Massachusetts (2013–present) | Massachusetts | | | 0 | 1.6% | |
| 2020 | - | **Michael Bloomberg** | February 14, 1942 (age 78); Boston, Massachusetts | Mayor of New York City, New York (2002–2013); CEO of Bloomberg L.P. | New York | | | 1 | 1.5% | |
| 2020 | - | **Pete Buttigieg** | January 19, 1982 (age 38); South Bend, Indiana | Mayor of South Bend, Indiana (2012–2020) | Indiana | | | 1 | 0.5% | |
| 2020 | - | **Amy Klobuchar** | May 25, 1960 (age 60); Plymouth, Minnesota | U.S. Senator from Minnesota (2007–present) | Minnesota | | | 0 | 0.2% | |
| 2020 | - | **Tulsi Gabbard** | April 12, 1981 (age 39); Leloaloa, American Samoa | U.S. representative from HI-02 (2013–2021) | Hawaii | | | 0 | 0.05% | |
| 2020 | - | **Tom Steyer** | June 27, 1957 (age 63); Manhattan, New York | Hedge fund manager Founder of Farallon Capital and Beneficial State Bank | California | | | 0 | 0% | |
| 2020 | - | **Deval Patrick** | July 31, 1956 (age 64); Chicago, Illinois | Governor of Massachusetts (2007–2015) | Massachusetts | | | 0 | 0% | |
| 2020 | - | **Michael Bennet** | November 28, 1964 (age 55); New Delhi, India | U.S. Senator from Colorado (2009–present) | Colorado | | | 0 | 0% | |
| 2020 | - | **Andrew Yang** | January 13, 1975 (age 45); Schenectady, New York | Entrepreneur Founder of Venture for America | New York | | | 0 | 0% | |
| 2024 | 40 | **Kamala Harris** | October 20, 1964 (age 59); Oakland, California | Vice President of the United States (2021–2025); U.S. Senator from California (2017–2021) | California | | 4,567 / 4,695 | 0 | 97.3% (Note: Harris joined the race after the primaries had concluded, following the withdrawal of Biden as the presumptive nominee.) | |
| 2024 | - | **Joe Biden** | November 20, 1942 (age 81); Scranton, Pennsylvania | President of the United States (2021–2025); Vice President of the United States (2009–2017); U.S. Senator from Delaware (1973–2009) | Delaware | | | 56 | 98.9% | |
| 2024 | - | **Dean Phillips** | January 20, 1969 (age 55); Saint Paul, Minnesota | U.S. representative from MN-03 (2019–present); CEO of Phillips Distilling Company (2000–2012) | Minnesota | | 4 / 3,949 | 0 | 0.1% | |
| 2024 | - | Jason Palmer | December 1, 1971 (age 52); Aberdeen, Maryland | Venture capitalist | Maryland | | 3 / 3,949 | 1 | 0.1% | |
| 2024 | - | Marianne Williamson | July 8, 1952 (age 72); Houston, Texas | Author; Founder of Project Angel Food; Candidate for president in 2020 | Washington, D.C. | | 0 / 3,949 | 0 | 0% | |
