= Walt Tomenga =

American politician

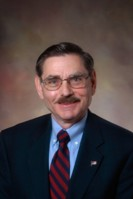

Member of the Iowa House of Representatives from the 69th district
- In office January 10, 2005 – January 11, 2009
- Preceded by: Kent A. Kramer
- Succeeded by: Erik Helland

Personal details
- Born: October 29, 1946 (age 79) Philadelphia, Pennsylvania
- Party: Republican
- Website: Tomenga's website

Walt Tomenga (born October 29, 1946) is a former Iowa State Representative from the 69th District. He served in the Iowa House of Representatives from 2005 to 2009.

During his last term, Tomenga served on several committees in the Iowa House - the Human Resources, Judiciary, and Public Safety committees. He also served on the Health and Human Services Appropriations Subcommittee and on the Public Retirement Systems Committee.

== Electoral history ==
*incumbent

Election	Political result	Candidate	Party	Votes	%
Iowa House of Representatives primary elections, 2002; District 69; Turnout: 2,567	Republican	Kent Kramer	Republican	1,152	44.9
Iowa House of Representatives primary elections, 2002; District 69; Turnout: 2,567	Republican	Walt Tomenga	Republican	706	27.5
Iowa House of Representatives primary elections, 2002; District 69; Turnout: 2,567	Republican	Carol J. Miller	Republican	543	21.2
Iowa House of Representatives primary elections, 2002; District 69; Turnout: 2,567	Republican	Brett H. Nelson	Republican	164	6.4
Iowa House of Representatives elections, 2004; District 69; Turnout: 19,213	Republican hold	Walt Tomenga	Republican	10,097	52.6
Iowa House of Representatives elections, 2004; District 69; Turnout: 19,213	Republican hold	Dave Campbell	Democratic	9,102	47.4
Iowa House of Representatives elections, 2006; District 69; Turnout: 15,876	Republican hold	Walt Tomenga*	Republican	8,758	55.2
Iowa House of Representatives elections, 2006; District 69; Turnout: 15,876	Republican hold	John Calhoun	Democratic	7,108	44.8

Iowa House of Representatives
Preceded by Kent A. Kramer	69th District; 2005 – 2009	Succeeded by Erik Helland
