= 2009 Iowa special elections =

2009 Iowa elections

The 2009 Iowa state special elections were held throughout 2009. These elections were to fill vacancies in various state and local positions, most notably in the Iowa House of Representatives. In 2009, neither special election had the potential to change partisan control of the Iowa House, though such races may nonetheless be viewed as predictors for future elections. As of November 4, 2009, there have been two resignations from the Iowa House in 2009, resulting in special elections in House Districts 33 and 90.

== Iowa House District 90 special election ==
District 90 Representative John Whitaker (D) announced on July 17, 2009, that he was resigning from the Iowa House to become U.S. Department of Agriculture Farm Service Administration Director in Iowa. Governor Chet Culver signed a proclamation on July 20 setting a special election to fill the vacancy for September 1, 2009. Democrat Curt Hanson won the election, beating Republican Stephen Burgmeier, Fourth of July Party candidate Dan Cesar, and Independent Douglas William Philips.

Iowa House District 90 special election
Party	Candidate	Votes	%
Democratic	Curt Hanson	3,965	
Republican	Stephen Burgmeier	3,838	
Independent	Douglas William Philips	242	
Fourth of July Party	Dan Cesar	40	
Total votes		8,098	100.00

== Iowa House District 33 special election ==
District 33 Representative Dick Taylor (D) announced on October 12, 2009, that he was resigning from the Iowa House for family reasons. Culver signed a proclamation on October 13 setting a special election to fill the vacancy for November 24, 2009. The candidates for the seat are Republican Joshua Thurston and Democrat Kirsten Running-Marquardt.

Iowa House District 90 special election
Party	Candidate	Votes	%
Republican	Joshua Thurston		
Democratic	Kirsten Running-Marquardt		
Total votes			100.00

== See also ==
- Iowa House of Representatives
- 2008 Iowa House of Representatives election
- Iowa General Assembly
- Political party strength in U.S. states
