= Valerie Biden Owens =

American political strategist (born 1945)

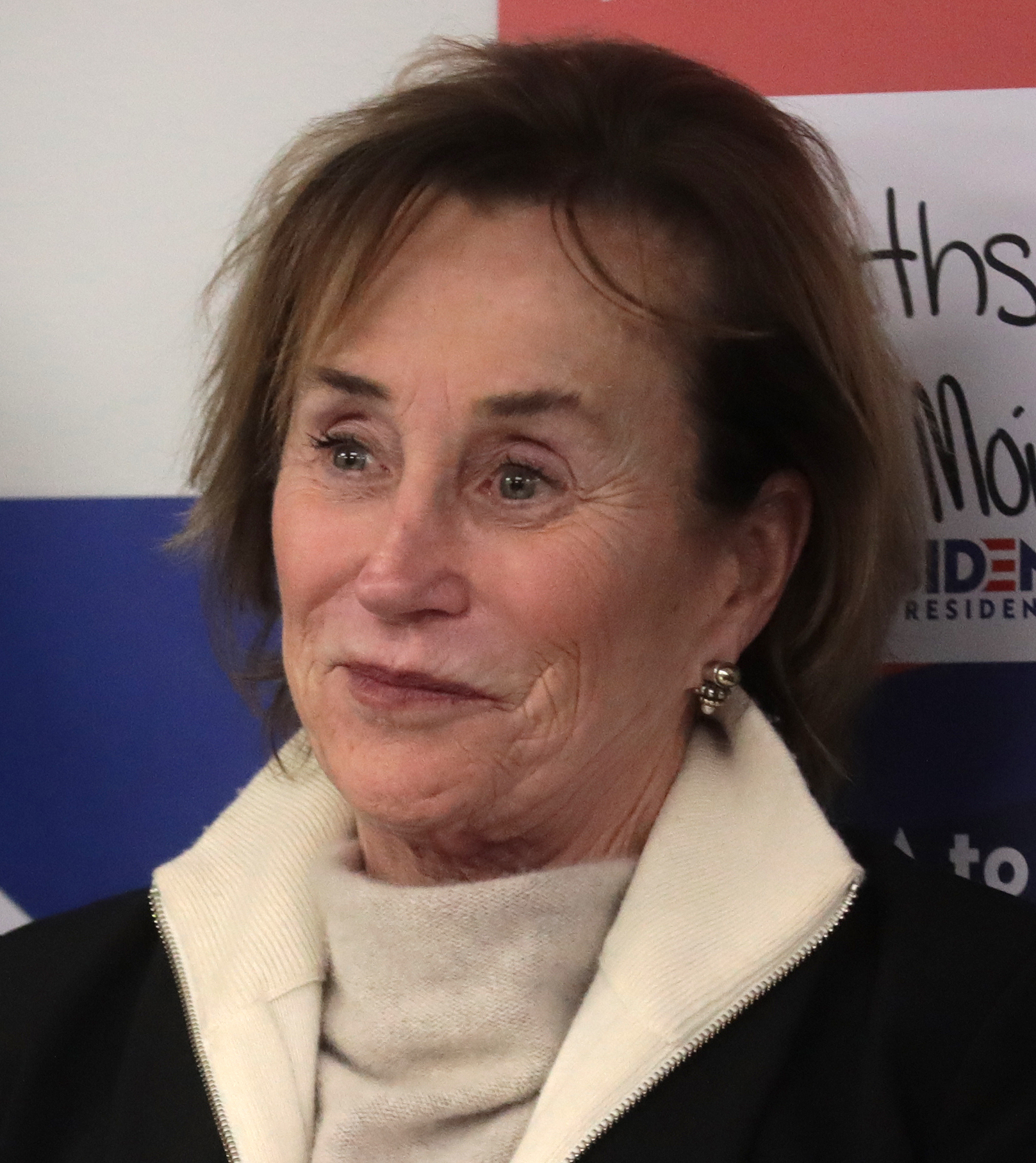
- Owens in 2020

Personal details
- Born: Mary Valerie Biden; November 5, 1945 (age 80) Boston, Massachusetts, U.S.
- Party: Democratic
- Spouse(s): Bruce Saunders (m. 1969; div. 1974) John T. Owens (m. 1975)
- Children: 3
- Relatives: Biden family
- Education: University of Delaware (BA)
- Website: Official website

Mary Valerie Biden Owens (born November 5, 1945) is an American political strategist, campaign manager, and former educator. She is the younger sister of Joe Biden, the 46th president of the United States. In 2016, President Barack Obama nominated her as alternate representative of the United States to the 71st Session of the General Assembly of the United Nations.

Owens has played a substantial role in all of her brother's political campaigns. She was the campaign manager during all of his Senate elections and for his 1988 and 2008 presidential campaigns, as well as a senior advisor to his successful 2020 presidential campaign. Owens published an autobiography, Growing Up Biden, in 2022. She received a presidential pardon from her brother shortly before his presidency ended.

== Early life and education ==
Mary Valerie Biden was born on November 5, 1945, in a suburb of Boston, Massachusetts, to Catherine Eugenia "Jean" (née Finnegan) and Joseph Robinette Biden Sr. Her brothers are Joe Jr., Francis "Frank" Biden, and James "Jim" Biden. The siblings are of Irish Catholic background. Their father was initially wealthy, but later suffered several financial setbacks. For several years, the family lived with Jean's parents in Scranton, Pennsylvania. Joe Biden Sr. later became a successful used car salesman, maintaining the family in a middle-class lifestyle.

Owens graduated from Ursuline Academy in Wilmington, Delaware, in 1963, and went on to study at the University of Delaware, where she was on the dean's list and was homecoming queen, graduating in 1967.

== Career ==
President Joe Biden statement on pardoning members of his family (January 20, 2025)

My family has been subjected to unrelenting attacks and threats, motivated solely by a desire to hurt me—the worst kind of partisan politics. Unfortunately, I have no reason to believe these attacks will end,

I believe in the rule of law, and I am optimistic that the strength of our legal institutions will ultimately prevail over politics. But baseless and politically motivated investigations wreak havoc on the lives, safety, and financial security of targeted individuals and their families. Even when individuals have done nothing wrong and will ultimately be exonerated, the mere fact of being investigated or prosecuted can irreparably damage their reputations and finances.

That is why I am exercising my power under the Constitution to pardon James B. Biden, Sara Jones Biden, Valerie Biden Owens, John T. Owens, and Francis W. Biden. The issuance of these pardons should not be mistaken as an acknowledgment that they engaged in any wrongdoing, nor should acceptance be misconstrued as an admission of guilt for any offense.

— Joe Biden,

After college, Owens was a teacher at Wilmington Friends School before focusing on politics.

From 1997 until 2016, she served as executive vice-president of Joe Slade White & Company, a media consultant firm. Owens has worked with the Delaware service organization, Ministry of Caring, for over 35 years and sits on their Board of Directors.

She has worked extensively with Women's Campaign International to help teach women how to develop and grow their political skills. In 2013, Owens traveled with her brother Joe Biden to the Vatican City as an official U.S. delegate for the inauguration of Pope Francis.

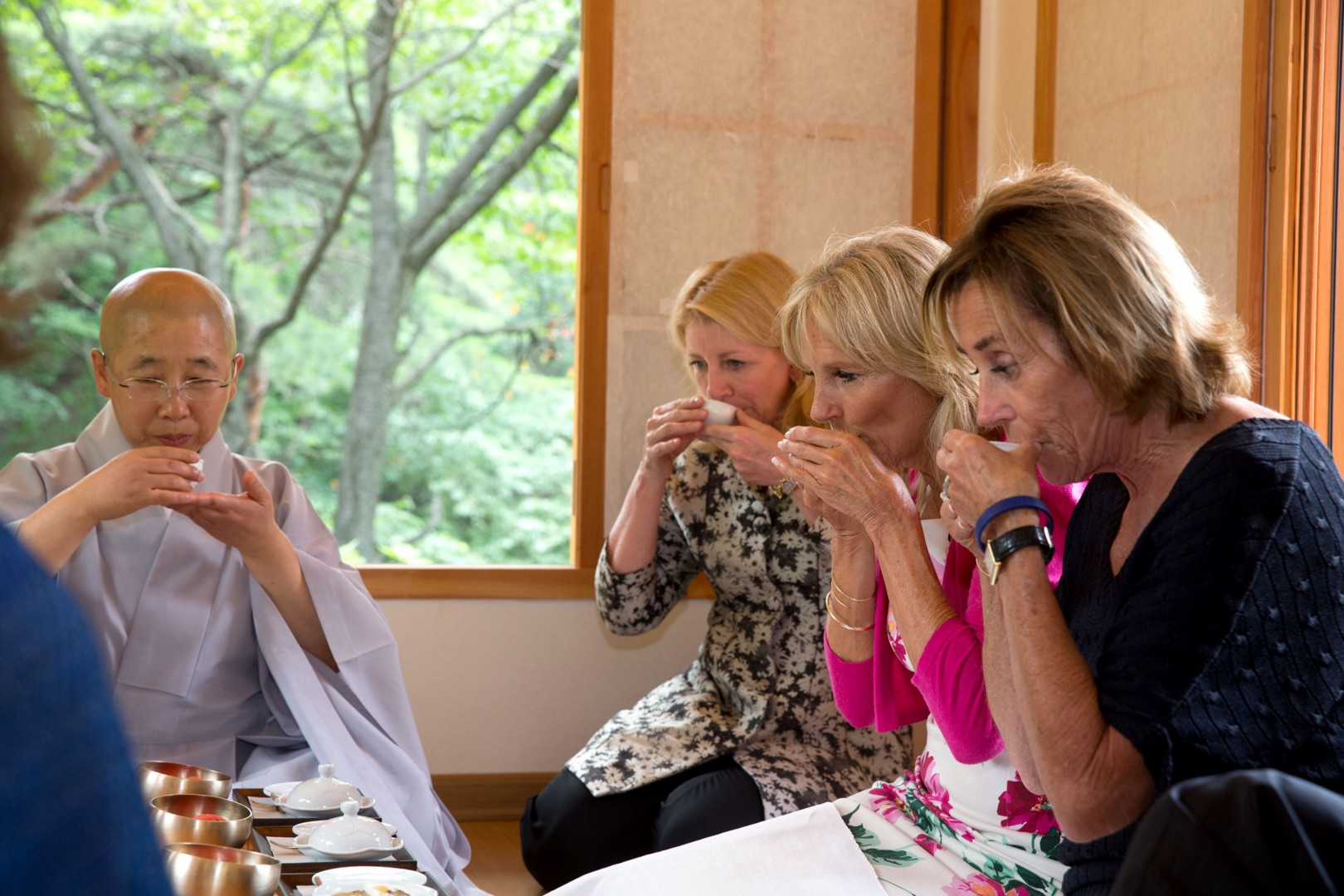
Owens in South Korea with her sister-in-law Jill Biden, 2015

In 2014, Owens was a Resident Fellow at the Harvard Institute of Politics. In 2017, Owens was a featured speaker at a Ted Talk conference in Wilmington, Delaware. Owens is vice-chair of both the Biden Institute at the University of Delaware and the Biden Foundation. Owens returns to the University of Delaware periodically to give lectures on politics and her experiences as a woman on the campaign trail.

She has traveled around the world as a motivational speaker, and teacher of leadership and communication seminars. She helped to found the Owens-Patrick seminar group. Owens currently sits on the advisory board for the University of Nevada, Las Vegas Public Policy Institute.

Owens has played a substantial role in all of her brother's political campaigns dating back to his first campaign, for the New Castle County, Delaware council in 1970. Owens managed for Joe Biden's 1988 presidential campaign. In 2008, Owens and Ashley Judd campaigned together in North Carolina at several events in support of Barack Obama and Joe Biden.

Joe Biden mentioned her in his presidential acceptance speech on November 7, 2020. Owens was in attendance at the event in Wilmington, Delaware, where she also met Maya Harris, the sister of Vice President-elect Kamala Harris.

President Biden granted a Full and Unconditional Pardon to Owens, her husband John T. Owens, their brother: James B. Biden, Sara Jones Biden, and Francis W. Biden on 19 Jan 2025

On January 19, 2025, President Joe Biden issued a pardon for Valerie and her husband John Owens, along with their other siblings and their spouses.

== Personal life ==
Owens's first husband was Bruce Saunders, whom she married in 1969. Bruce and Valerie moved in with Joe Biden and his two sons, Hunter and Beau, following the death of her sister-in-law Neilia in a car crash in December 1972. Valerie helped look after her nephews so that Joe could begin his first term as senator in 1973. Valerie and Bruce had both worked on Joe Biden's first Senate campaign in 1972.

Owens is married to attorney John T. Owens, with whom she has three children: son Cuffe Owens, also an attorney, and two daughters, Missy Owens and Casey Owens Castello. John T. Owens was a friend of Joe Biden's during their law school years at Syracuse University. The two were wed in a Roman Catholic ceremony at the Church Center for the United Nations in 1975. In October 2021, Cuffe Owens married reality TV star Meghan King. They separated two months later and the marriage was later annulled.

== Awards and honors ==
Harvard University honored her with their 'Women Inspiring Change" award in 2015.

University of Delaware bestowed an Honorary Doctorate of Law to her in 2018.

Ursuline Academy inducted her to their Distinguished Alumnae Hall of Fame in 2018.

In 2021, Forbes listed Owens on their Impact List of 50 Women over 50 who are inspiring change in their communities through social entrepreneurship, law, advocacy and education.

In 2025, Owens was inducted into the Delaware Women’s Hall of Fame.
