= Tom Determann =

American politician (born 1950)

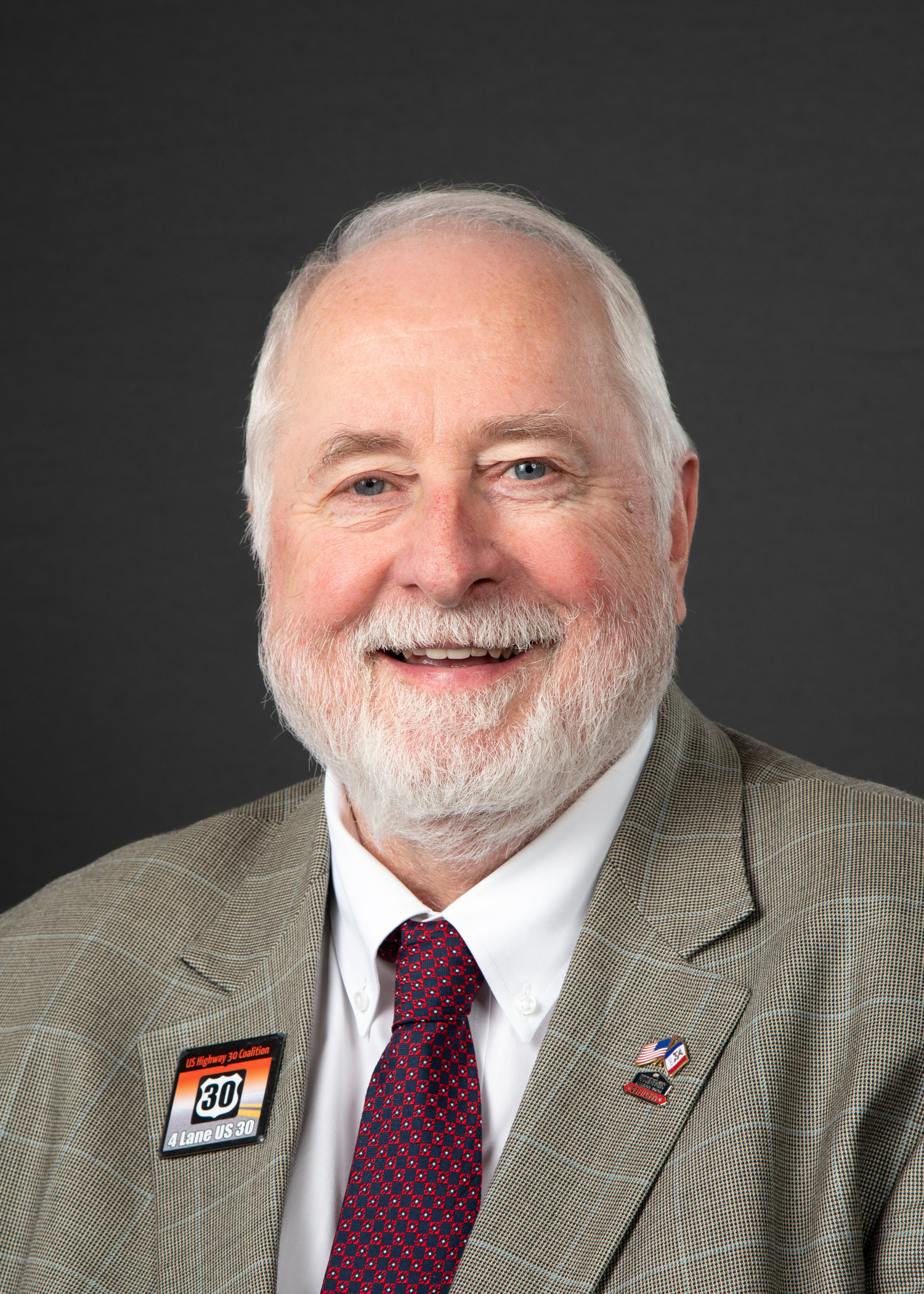
- Official portrait, 2023

Member of the Iowa House of Representatives from the 69th district
- Incumbent
- Assumed office January 9, 2023
- Preceded by: Kirsten Running-Marquardt (redistricting)
- Succeeded by: Randy Meier (elect)

Personal details
- Born: 1950 (age 75–76) Clinton, Iowa, U.S.
- Party: Republican
- Spouse: Judy
- Children: 2
- Education: Milwaukee School of Engineering

Tom Determann (born 1950) is an American politician and retired businessman who has represented the 69th district of the Iowa House of Representatives since January 2023, which covers part of eastern Clinton County, including most of Clinton and Camanche. He is a member of the Republican Party.

== Early life ==
Determann was born in 1950 in Clinton, Iowa, and was raised in Clinton and Camanche. He attended the Milwaukee School of Engineering and served in the United States Army for a time.

== Political career ==
Determann served five years on the Clinton County Board of Supervisors, being first elected in 2016 and reelected in 2020, and at one point served as the Board's chairman. He resigned from the Board upon his election to the House in 2022. He also served on the Clinton City Council, and was briefly mayor pro tempore of Clinton. He has also chaired the Clinton Area Chamber of Commerce and the Clinton Regional Development Corporation, served as president of the Iowa-Illinois Highway Partnership and the Clinton Rotary Club, served on the Iowa Department of Transportation Freight Advisory Council, and directed the Iowa Association of Business and Industry.

Following decennial redistricting in 2021, Determann announced his bid for the open 69th district of the Iowa House of Representatives in January 2022. He won the Republican primary unopposed on June 7, 2022, and defeated Democrat Jennifer Hansen in the general election on November 8 by over 1,100 votes.

Determann endorsed Ron DeSantis for president in 2023.

In 2024, Determann filed to run for reelection. He won the Republican primary unopposed on June 4, 2024, and faced Democrat Randy Meier in the general election on November 5, 2024, whom he defeated by over 2,100 votes.

Determann again ran for reelection in 2026, winning the Republican primary unopposed on June 2, 2026, and again faced Meier in the general election on November 3, 2026. He narrowly lost reelection to Meier, who defeated him by nearly 400 votes.

During his time in the House, Determann served on the Economic Growth and Technology, Local Government, Commerce, Transportation, and Veterans Affairs committees, and served as vice chairman and chairman of the latter two, respectively.

Determann has described himself as a fiscal conservative. He voiced support for reductions in government spending and lowering property taxes, as well as increasing state funding towards mental health services. He also aligned himself with socially conservative positions, such as voting for a bill to repeal a state law protecting transgender people from discrimination, as well as sponsoring a bill to restrict access to abortion medication.

== Personal life ==
Determann has a wife, Judy, and two daughters. He resides in Camanche. He is the former owner of Determann Industries, a transportation and logistics company.

== Electoral history ==
*=incumbent

Election	Political result	Candidate	Party	Votes	%
Iowa House of Representatives Republican primary elections, 2022; District 69; Turnout: 1,320	Republican (newly redistricted)	Tom Determann	Republican	1,314	99.5
Iowa House of Representatives Republican primary elections, 2022; District 69; Turnout: 1,320	Republican (newly redistricted)	Other/Write-in votes		6	0.5
Iowa House of Representatives general elections, 2022; District 69; Turnout: 10,704	Republican (newly redistricted)	Tom Determann	Republican	5,926	55.4
Iowa House of Representatives general elections, 2022; District 69; Turnout: 10,704	Republican (newly redistricted)	Jennifer Hansen	Democratic	4,770	44.6
Iowa House of Representatives general elections, 2022; District 69; Turnout: 10,704	Republican (newly redistricted)	Other/Write-in votes		8	0.1
Iowa House of Representatives Republican primary elections, 2024; District 69; Turnout: 568	Republican	Tom Determann*	Republican	564	99.3
Iowa House of Representatives Republican primary elections, 2024; District 69; Turnout: 568	Republican	Other/Write-in votes		4	0.7
Iowa House of Representatives general elections, 2024; District 69; Turnout: 15,031	Republican	Tom Determann*	Republican	8,568	57
Iowa House of Representatives general elections, 2024; District 69; Turnout: 15,031	Republican	Randy Meier	Democratic	6,454	42.9
Iowa House of Representatives general elections, 2024; District 69; Turnout: 15,031	Republican	Other/Write-in votes		9	0.1
