= Randy Meier (politician) =

American politician

Member of the Iowa House of Representatives from the 69th district
- Member-elect
- Assumed office January 1, 2027
- Preceded by: Tom Determann

Personal details
- Party: Democratic
- Website: Campaign website

Randy Meier is an American politician. A member of the Democratic Party, he was elected to the Iowa House of Representatives in 2026, representing the 69th district. He unseated Republican Tom Determann in the 2026 election. He was employed at the Clinton Police Department.
