= Joe Biden 2008 presidential campaign =

2008 presidential campaign of Delaware Senator Joe Biden

Joe Biden for President 2008
- Campaign: 2008 United States presidential election
- Candidate: Joe Biden; U. S. Senator from Delaware (1973–2009); Member of the New Castle County Council from the 4th district (1971–1973)
- Affiliation: Democratic Party
- Status: Suspended; became running mate on August 23, 2008
- Announced: January 7, 2007
- Launched: January 31, 2007
- Suspended: January 3, 2008
- Headquarters: Wilmington, Delaware
- Key people: Luis Navarro (Manager); Mark Paustenbach (Press Secretary); Valerie Biden Owens (National chair); Ted Kaufman (top advisor)
- Receipts: US$11.4 million (December 31, 2007)

Website
- www.joebiden.com (archived)

Joe Biden, the senior U.S. senator from Delaware, began his 2008 presidential campaign when he announced his candidacy for president of the United States on the January 7, 2007, edition of Meet the Press. He officially became a candidate on January 31, 2007, after filing papers with the Federal Election Commission.

During the campaign, Biden focused on his plan to achieve political success in the Iraq War through a system of federalization. He touted his record in the Senate as the head of several committees and experience in foreign policy. Despite a few notable endorsements, Biden failed to garner significant support in opinion polls, and was marred by controversial comments made while campaigning. He ultimately dropped out of the race on January 3, 2008, after coming in fifth place and capturing less than 1% of the vote in the Iowa caucus.

Seven months after the conclusion of his campaign, Biden was chosen by Democratic nominee Barack Obama to be his running mate on August 21, 2008. Obama and Biden would go on to win the general election, and were sworn in on January 20, 2009, causing Biden to leave the Senate after 36 years. Obama and Biden served two consecutive terms in office. Biden declined to run in the 2016 election, instead supporting Hillary Clinton, who would go on to lose the general election to Republican nominee Donald Trump. In the 2020 election, Biden launched his third campaign for president. Biden would go on to become the Democratic nominee, defeating Obama's successor, the 45th president and Republican nominee Trump in the general election, becoming the 46th president of the United States. Biden initially ran for reelection, but withdrew from the race in July 2024. Biden served only one term in office.

== Campaign development ==
=== Groundwork for the campaign ===
Biden had run for president once before, but his 1988 presidential campaign had lasted for only three and a half months. He had been forced to withdraw due to controversies arising over plagiarizing other politicians' speeches without credit, and lying about his academic record.

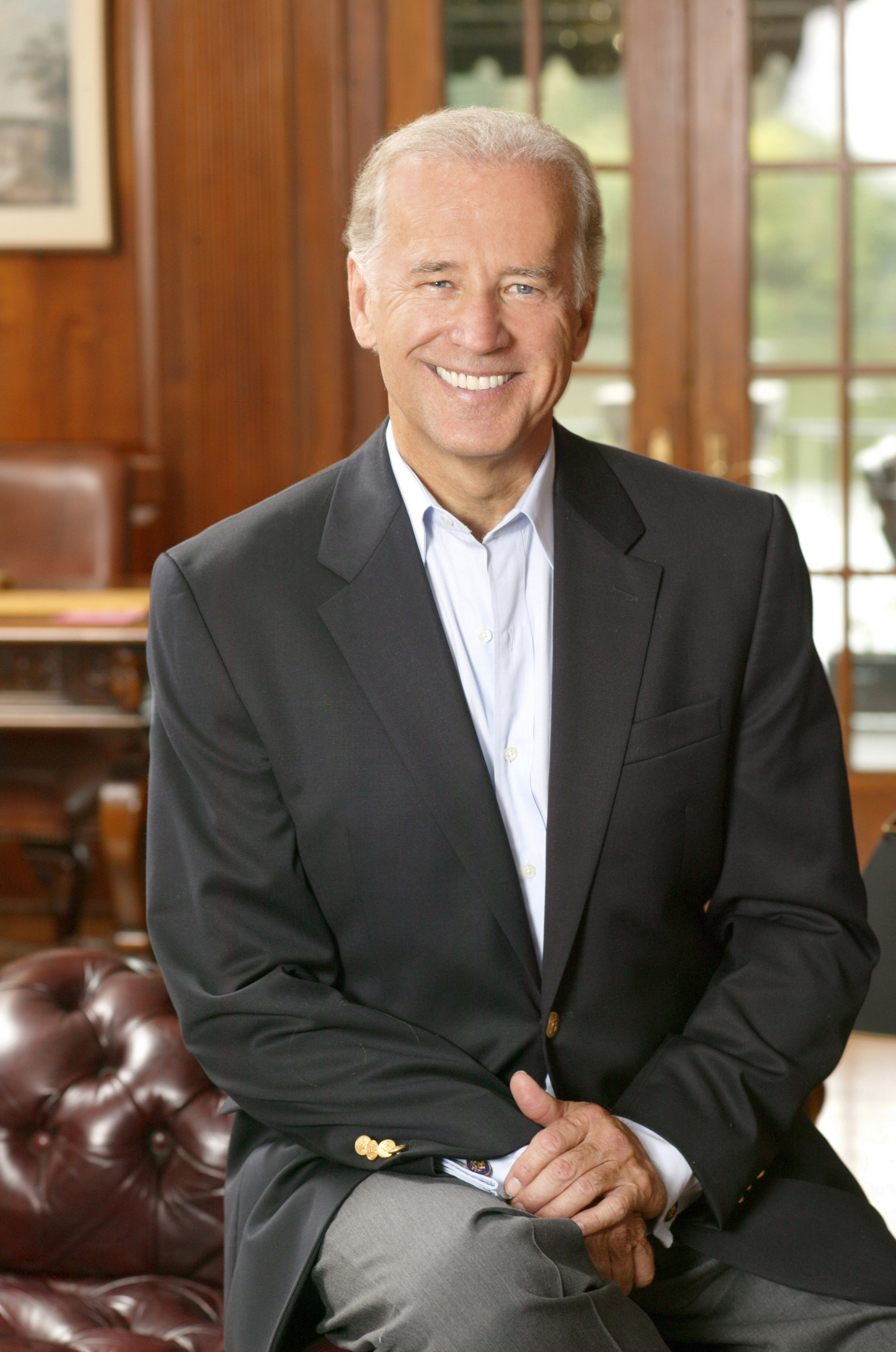
Presidential candidate Joe Biden (D-DE)

Biden first mentioned his intentions to run for president for 2008 on the Don Imus radio show on December 8, 2004. In the edition of January 23, 2006, of The News Journal, Delaware's largest daily newspaper, columnist Harry F. Themal reported that Biden "occupies the sensible center of the Democratic Party." Themal concludes that this is the position Biden desires, and that in a campaign "he plans to stress the dangers to the security of the average American, not just from the terrorist threat, but from the lack of health assistance, crime, and energy dependence on unstable parts of the world."

In early 2006, an investigation by editors of the online encyclopedia Wikipedia discovered that Biden's congressional staffers had edited the site, recasting discussion of a potential 2008 candidacy in a more favorable light.

=== First-quarter 2007 ===
Biden declared his candidacy for president on January 31, 2007, although he had discussed running for months prior. It had been speculated that Biden would be offered and accept the position of Secretary of State because of his foreign policy experience and credentials. Biden rejected the notion outright, saying "Under no administration will I accept the job of Secretary of State". He stated that he was focused only on the presidency. At a campaign event, Biden commented, "I know a lot of my opponents out there say I'd be a great secretary of state. Seriously, every one of them. Do you watch any of the debates? 'Joe's right, Joe's right, Joe's right.'" Other candidates commenting that "Joe is right" in the Democratic debates has been converted into a Biden campaign theme and ad.

On January 31, 2007, as Biden entered the presidential race he attacked frontrunner Hillary Clinton's plan for the War in Iraq. During an interview on Good Morning America, Biden called Clinton's plan "a disaster" and "counterproductive". Biden stated that his plan called for a "political solution" unlike Clinton's "military solution". Biden praised Hillary Clinton as a presidential candidate, calling her "fully qualified". He drew criticism for his attempted praise of Illinois Senator and future running mate Barack Obama, referring to him as "the first mainstream African-American who is articulate and bright and clean and a nice-looking guy", a remark criticized as racist. Biden was criticized in the popular press for his comments about Obama, and although he apologized, his campaign was damaged by the remark. Eventually, Obama stated that he did not view this comment as racist.

A few weeks later, Biden appeared on the Feb 18 episode of Face the Nation, criticizing the new surge policy of the Bush administration in Iraq. He spoke about a piece of legislation that he put forth before the Senate to stall the surge policy from enactment, which would strip the president of the authorization he was given to go to war in 2002. After the legislation went up for a vote it failed by four votes in the Senate. Biden stated:

[President Bush should] make it clear that the purpose that he has troops in there is to in fact protect against al Qaeda gaining chunks of territory, training the Iraqi forces, force protection and for our forces. It's not to get in the midst of a civil war.

While campaigning in March 2007, Biden stated that he would put a great quantity of focus on the first Southern primary state of South Carolina as a strategy. While speaking to rural audiences Biden noted that the war in Iraq continued to be an important facet of his campaign agenda. He said that he would talk to Independent voters to convince them to propel him to the nomination stating that if "the Democratic nominee cannot attract independents, Democrats cannot win". Biden would later drop out of the race before the South Carolina primary would take place.

=== Second-quarter 2007 ===
In April 2007 Biden criticized Republican presidential candidate John McCain calling him "fundamentally wrong" for his support of the surge policy in Iraq. Biden wrote an opinion column to the Sacramento Bee, which called the surge a "failed policy". He conceded that violence was down in Iraq but that the "militia ... simply waiting out the surge" accounted for the downward trend. Biden argued that no political change had occurred as there had been "no trust of the government by the [Iraqi] people." He later described his plan which calls for a system of federalism.

Biden used the perceived need for a change in the strategy in the War in Iraq as the cornerstone of his campaign

As the debate stage of the election began, Biden participated in the first presidential debate of the election on April 26, 2007, in South Carolina. He was the second to respond to a question originally posed to Senator Hillary Clinton on whether Senator Harry Reid's assessment that the war in Iraq was "lost" is factual. Biden responded by stating the war is not a "game show" or a "football game", which can be lost. He went on to argue that the real question that should be asked is, "Are we going to be able to leave Iraq ... and leave behind something other than chaos?" He elaborated on this statement revealing his belief in the need for a change in the strategy for Iraq, declaring that the United States has to "change the fundamental premise of this engagement, and that is ... to decentralize Iraq ... give the regions control over their own destiny ..."

After the South Carolina debate, Biden campaigned in California to begin May 2007 attending events in San Francisco. Later in the month after President George W. Bush enacted economic sanctions against Sudan to pressure the government to end the genocide in Darfur, Biden momentarily shifted focus from Iraq to the crisis in Darfur. He released a statement on the campaign trail that expressed his belief that Bush was right to enact the sanctions. However, Biden argued that it was not enough, calling for a No-Fly Zone over the region and a possible commitment of United States forces to the nation.

On June 3, Biden participated in the second Democratic Debate featured on CNN, and set in the first primary state of New Hampshire. Biden discussed the War in Iraq, his recent vote to continue the funding of the troops and briefly about illegal immigration. On immigration Biden stated that it would cost too much money to send all 14 million illegal immigrants back to their native countries. He stated that those who commit crimes should be sent back and the rest should be given a pathway to citizenship. His statement: "Folks, being commander in chief requires you to occasionally be practical." drew some laughter from the audience. Later in the debate Biden addressed his opposition to the "Don't ask, don't tell" policy of the military and touched on the situation in Darfur.

Later in June, Biden participated in another debate, this time featured on PBS and set at Howard University in Washington D.C. At the debate the candidates discussed issues pertinent to African-Americans including education, civil rights and reproductive safety. Biden stated that to prevent the spread of AIDS public servants have to communicate to "black men ... [that] it is not unmanly to wear a condom, getting women to understand they can say no, getting people in the position where testing matters. I got tested for AIDS. I know Barack [Obama] got tested for AIDS."

=== Third-quarter 2007 ===
The next month Biden participated in two debates: The July 12 Debate in Detroit, Michigan and most notably the July 23 YouTube debate in Charleston, South Carolina featured on CNN. In this debate when asked what Republican he would pick as a running mate if forced, Biden answered, "I would pick Chuck Hagel, and I'd consider asking Dick Lugar to be secretary of state." In regards to Iraq, Biden stated that it was unrealistic to say that all troops would be redeployed. He instructed those who used that rhetoric to "Tell the truth for a change." When he discussed education Biden declared that he "would scrap" the No Child Left Behind Act. He concluded his participation in the debate after being asked to say something he didn't like about the candidate to his left, Dennis Kucinich. Biden replied, "I don't like a damn thing about him ... only kidding. The best thing about him is his wife."

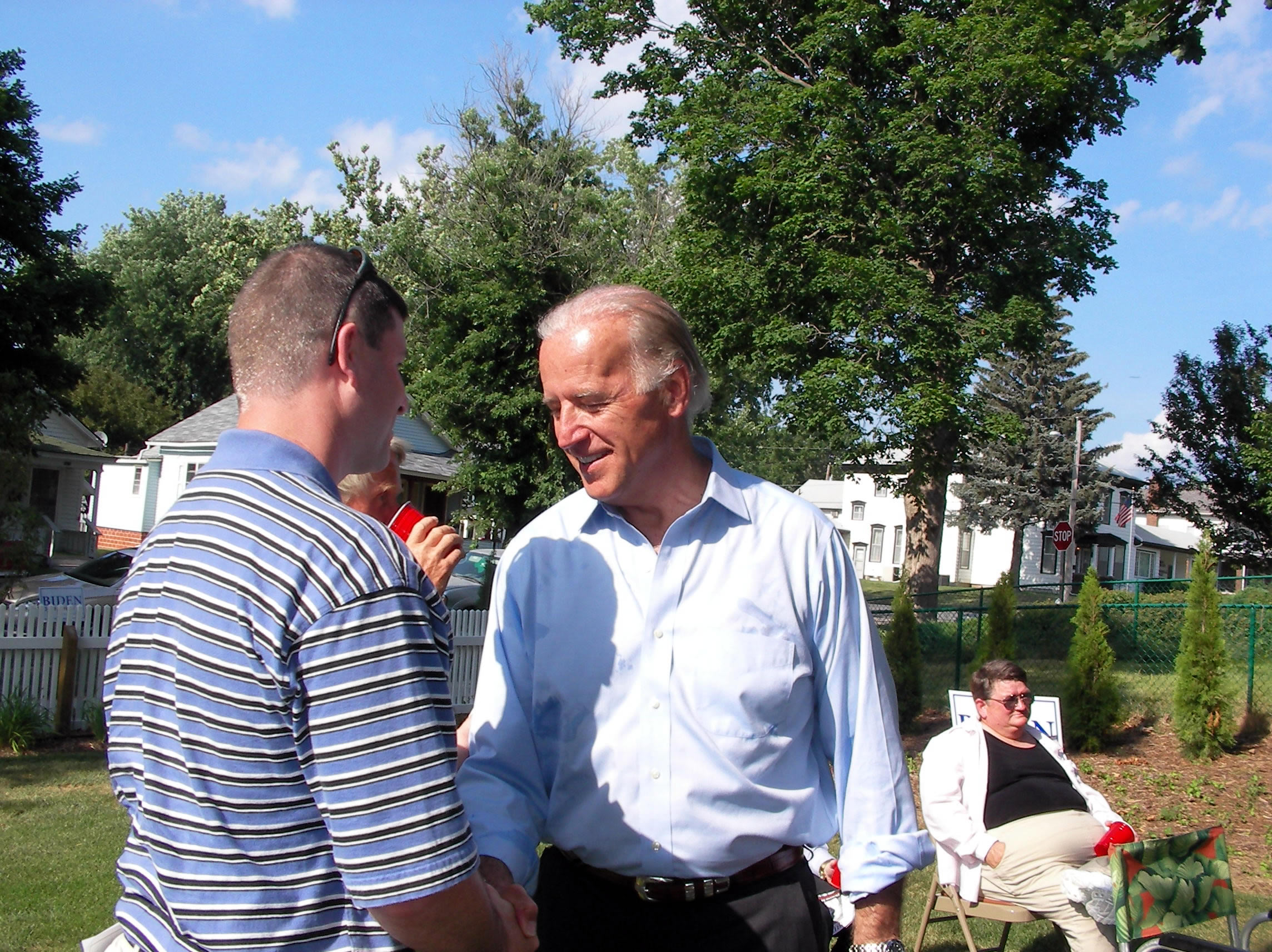
Biden campaigning at a Creston, Iowa house party, July 2007

The next month Biden was not able to participate in two debates, the August 4 debate sponsored by the DailyKos and the August 9 LGBT Debate featured on the gay network Logo. He participated in the August 7 AFL–CIO Debate and the August 19 Iowa debate featured on ABC. On August 20 Biden aired his first campaign advertisement in the first caucus state of Iowa. In the 30-second ad a voiceover states that Biden has a plan to end the Iraq War, and that "We (America) must end this war in a way that doesn't require us to send their (soldiers) grandchild back." It continues by declaring, "Joe Biden is the only candidate with a plan to get us out of Iraq and keep us out."

As September began, Biden confided to the Associated Press that he was "counting on Iowa a lot". He hoped to come in "first, second or an indistinguishable third" and if not he would leave the campaign trail and return to Washington. His early statements seemed to mirror the future as he would ultimately drop out of the race after finishing lower than third in the Iowa Caucus. The results also presented a refutation of what he stated in September 2007 when he said that the campaign was "gaining some traction [in Iowa]." The September 2007 assessments made by University of Iowa professor Bruce Gronbeck and Drake University professor Dennis Goldford displayed more merit at the end of the race after Gronbeck stated that Biden was not gaining traction in the race and with Goldford adding that "[Biden] talks like a senator, not a president". Democratic strategist Ron Parker argued in September that Biden still had a chance but just had to sell his case to the American people.

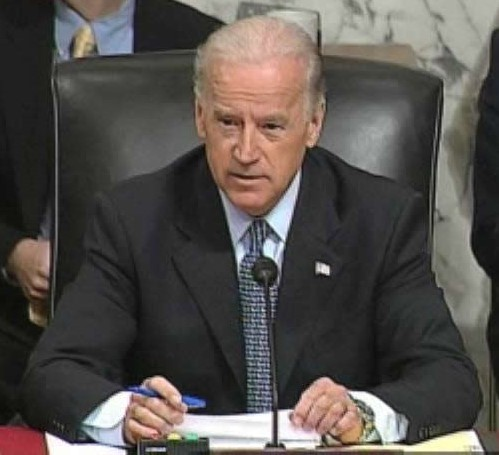
Biden questions General David Petraeus

On September 9, two days before the Iraq commanding General David Petraeus addressed the Senate, Biden stated that, "I really respect him, and I think he's dead flat wrong [about the War in Iraq]". He criticized the president, arguing, "This president has no plan – how to win and/or how to leave". During the September 11 testimony by the General, Biden stated that the question to be asked to determine progress was "Are we any closer to a lasting political settlement in Iraq at the national level today than we were when the surge began eight months ago?" He answered his own question by stating "In my judgment, I must tell you, based on my experience and my observation here, as well as in-country, the answer to ... [the] questions is no." After the testimony concluded, Biden and other Democrats were criticized for their conduct during the deliberations. In the following weeks Biden would continue with these arguments while campaigning.

At the September 26 MSNBC debate, Biden explained how he would allow for Social Security to last. He said that in the 1980s he had a meeting with prominent members of Congress and the solution they came up with was the raise the cap level, he stated that now the same solution would apply and that unity between the two parties was also necessary, "It was Joe Biden, Pat Moynihan, Bob Dole ... [and] George Mitchell when we made that deal [to reform social security]. I'll never forget Bob Dole turning to Pat Moynihan and saying, 'we all got to jump in this boat at the same time.' So the bottom line here is, you can't do it by growing the economy alone. So I would raise the cap." Later in the debate Biden was one of three participants (along with Dodd and Richardson) who said they would ban smoking in public places.

=== Fourth-quarter 2007 ===
On October 23 Biden revealed his health care plan. It called for expanded coverage for children and adults but stops short of mandates for complete universal coverage. It aimed to encourage wellness and modernization of treatment. Biden stated it would cost between $80 billion and $110 billion per year. He said it could have been paid with a rollback of tax cuts of the richest 1% bracket, capital gains and dividends and the elimination of tax loopholes for hedge fund managers and private equity partners. The plan would also had increased the SCHIP program to include children 300% above the poverty level.

At the October 30, 2007, debate in Philadelphia and the November 15 debate in Las Vegas, Biden was noted for some one-liners that drew some laughter from the audience. First, when speaking about Rudy Giuliani at the Philadelphia debate, Biden stated, "There's only three things he mentions in a sentence: a noun, and a verb and 9/11." At the Las Vegas debate Biden seemed to attack all his opponents when he stated, "I know there's more to say, Campbell. I appreciate you asking me the question and I'm sorry I answered it. I know you're not supposed to answer questions, based on what I've heard."

In his final debate before the Iowa Caucus, Biden participated in the December 13 forum sponsored by The Des Moines Register. His most notable part came when asked to respond to allegations that he was "uncomfortable" speaking about race since making remarks earlier in the year when he referred to Barack Obama using the adjectives "clean" and "articulate". Biden answered the question remarking that anyone who has known him knew of this commitment to civil rights and race relations. Barack Obama came to his defense, saying: "Joe is on the right side of the issues and is fighting every day for a better America."

Following the debate and subsequent assassination of former Pakistani Prime Minister Benazir Bhutto, Biden shifted focus of his campaign to the issue of relations toward the nation of Pakistan. He stated that the country was "the most dangerous nation on the planet" and that he had made that assertion on previous occasions. The event marked an opportunity for a candidate such as Biden with past foreign policy experience to gain momentum in the opinion polls with the looming Iowa Caucus less than a week away. Biden finished off the year's campaigning trying to improve his standing in the race by speaking of the events surrounding the situation in Pakistan and particularly his solution of protecting the nuclear weapons of the nation.

=== Withdrawal ===
After finishing in fifth place in the Iowa caucus on January 3, 2008, garnering only one percent of the total vote, Biden ended his presidential bid. In a rally alongside his family and friends, Biden declared, "I ain't going away. I'll be going back to the Senate as the chairman of the Foreign Relations Committee and I will continue to make the case I've been making".

== Financials ==
According to the Federal Elections Commission, Biden raised $2,343,639 in the second quarter of 2007. The most support came from the state of New York which donated $571,800. Biden raised nearly $2 million in the third quarter of 2007. Biden qualified for matching funds for his primary campaign but did not decide whether or not to accept them. According to OpenSecrets, Joe Biden raised $8,215,739 for his presidency campaign. Individual contributors gave $6,087,885 toward his campaign, PACs gave $101,475, and $2,026,379 has come from his Senate Re-election Fund. 66% of the PAC contributions came from business groups, 19% from labor groups, and the final 16% from ideological organizations. When he withdrew, Biden had $1,886,340 on hand, had spent $6,329,324, and had a total of $128,210 in debt.

== Public perceptions ==
=== Endorsements ===
List of people who endorsed Joe Biden

Biden's endorsers include:

- U.S. Senator Tom Carper (D-DE)
- State Representative McKinley Bailey (D-IA)
- State Representative Jimmy Bales (D-SC)
- State Representative Jim Battle (D-SC)
- State Attorney General Beau Biden (D-DE)
- State Representative Garrett Bradley (D-MA)
- State House Speaker Pro Tempore, Rep. Polly Bukta (D-IA)
- State Representative Dennis Cohoon (D-IA)
- State Representative Joe Driscoll (D-MA)
- State House Assistant Majority Leader, Rep. Dan Eaton (D-NH)
- State Representative Mary A. Gaskill (D-IA)
- State Representative Jerry Govan (D-SC)
- State Representative Robert Haley (D-NH)
- State Representative Bill Hatch (D-NH)
- State Representative Lisa Heddens (D-IA)
- State Representative Doris Kelley (D-IA)
- State Representative Paul Kujawski (D-MA)
- Sam Latham, the president of the Delaware state AFL–CIO
- State Representative Jim Lykam (D-IA)
- State Senator Gerald Malloy (D-SC)
- State Representative Mike Marsh (D-NH)
- State House Majority Leader, Rep. Kevin McCarthy (D-IA)
- Richard McDonaugh, Jr., the president of the Delaware state United Auto Workers
- State Representative Vida Miller (D-SC)
- State Representative Eric Palmer (D-IA)
- State Representative Mark Preston (D-NH)
- State Senator Herman C. Quirmbach (D-IA)
- State Representative Mike Reasoner (D-IA)
- State Senator Glenn Reese (D-SC)
- State House Majority Leader John Rogers (D-MA)
- State Representative Jim Ryan (D-NH)
- State Senator Joe Seng (D-IA)
- State Representative Steve Shurtleff (D-NH)
- State Representative James Smith (D-SC)
- Julian Stern, founder of the JFJ Foundation
- State Representative Dick Taylor (D-IA)
- State Representative Roger Thomas (D-IA)
- State Senator Jim Timilty (D-MA)
- State Representative James Vallee (D-MA)
- State Representative Brian Wallace (D-MA)
- State Representative Jim Webber (D-NH)
- State Representative John Whitaker (D-IA)
- State Representative Bruce Hunter (D-IA)
- State Representative Robert Rice (D-MA)
- State Representative Charles Murphy (D-MA)
- State Representative Bob Williams (D-NH)
- State Representative Eric Palmer (D-IA)
- State Representative Dennis Cohoon (D-IA)
- Actor Richard Schiff

=== Polling ===
Perhaps the biggest problem Biden faced was that voters did not know about him and his candidacy. An April 2–5 poll conducted by Gallup found that 38% of the public had never heard of Joe Biden and 17% had no opinion at all about him. In contrast, 0% of the public had never heard of Hillary Clinton and only 3% had no opinion according to a June 1–3 poll by Gallup. A September poll conducted by Clemson University found that 36% of the public had never heard of Joe Biden and only 44% had a favorable opinion of him. However, this was the highest awareness rating in the Democratic field outside of the frontrunners (Clinton, Barack Obama, and John Edwards) and non-declared but highly discussed Al Gore. A September 18 poll found that 56% of respondents had not heard enough about Biden to form an opinion about him.

Biden had remained low in the opinion polls when compared to other candidates. A Rasmussen survey taken September 19–24 put him in fourth place among his Democratic opponents at 4%, trailing Clinton, Obama, and Edwards. In the American Research Group, Biden was fourth at 5% behind Clinton, Obama, and Edwards, for the month of October 2007. In head-to-head matchups with Republican candidates, Biden trailed Senator John McCain on January 10, 2007, 38% to 46%. On July 17, Biden trailed former New York City Mayor Rudy Giuliani 37% to 46%. The closest Biden came to a GOP candidate in a head-to-head matchup was against former senator Fred Thompson, trailing him 38% to 40% on July 17, 2007.

=== Experience vs. change ===
This [election] is not about experience. It's not about change. It's about action.

Biden spoke of the fact that he had spent 34 years in the Senate and had been active in many congressional committees including being the chairman of the U.S. Senate Committee on Foreign Relations and formerly holding the post as chairman of the Judiciary Committee. On the campaign trail he touted his years of foreign policy experience particularly in regard to the conflict in Bosnia, which he feels he played a role in ending. Biden stated earlier in his campaign that "[he] truly believe[s] the American public is waiting for leaders to come along who have the experience to say what they will do to restore America's leadership in the world." At times during his campaign he believed his experience would help him win the Democratic nomination, but when Barack Obama's campaign began to surge with the candidate's emphasis on change, Biden shifted his focus from his experience in politics to his ability for action. He stated during a November 2007 debate, "This [election] is not about experience. It's not about change. It's about action. Who among us is going to be able to, on Day 1, step in and end the war?"

=== Plan for Iraq ===
Earlier in his campaign the most important issue for Biden was the conflict in Iraq. In November 2006, Biden and Leslie Gelb, President Emeritus of the Council on Foreign Relations, released a comprehensive strategy to end sectarian violence in Iraq. Rather than continuing the present approach or withdrawing, the plan calls for "a third way": federalizing Iraq and giving Kurds, Shiites, and Sunnis "breathing room" in their own regions. With public approval of the handling of the conflict decreasing considerably since the invasion in 2003, Biden believed this plan would have helped his campaign among the electorate had he been nominated. The key points included:

1. Giving Iraq's major groups a measure of autonomy in their own regions. A central government would be left in charge of interests such as defending the borders and distributing oil revenues.
2. Guaranteeing Sunnis – who have no oil rights – a proportionate share of oil revenue and reintegrating those who have not fought against Coalition forces.
3. Increase, not end, reconstruction assistance but insist that Arab States of the Persian Gulf fund it and tie it to the creation of a jobs program and to the protection of minority rights.
4. Initiate a diplomatic offensive to enlist the support of the major powers and neighboring countries for a political settlement in Iraq and create an Oversight Contact Group to enforce regional commitments.
5. Begin the phased redeployment of U.S. forces in 2007 and withdraw most of them by 2008, leaving a small follow-on force for security and policing actions. The plan named as The Biden-Brownback Resolution passed on the Senate floor 75–23 on September 25, 2007, including 26 Republican votes.

=== Controversial comments ===
Controversial comments had adversely affected the campaign of Joe Biden. Washington Post columnist Richard Cohen is quoted as saying that Biden's candidacy might be endangered by his "manic-obsessive running of the mouth."

==== Indian-Americans ====
In July 2006, while speaking to a group of Indian-Americans in Manchester, New Hampshire, Biden stated in regards to his relationship with the Indian-American community: "I've had a great relationship. In Delaware, the largest growth in population is Indian Americans—moving from India. You cannot go to a 7-Eleven or a Dunkin' Donuts unless you have a slight Indian accent. I'm not joking." His comment was caught on C-SPAN. When asked to explain further, Biden spokesperson Margaret Aitken stated "The Senator [Biden] admires, supports and respects the Indian-American community ... The point Senator Biden was making is that there has been a vibrant Indian-American community in Delaware for decades. It has primarily been made up of engineers, scientists and physicians, but more recently, middle-class families are moving into Delaware and purchasing family-run small businesses ..." The Indian-American activist who was on the receiving end of Biden's comment later called the media coverage of Biden's comments "completely unfair," and stated that he was "100 percent behind (Biden) because he did nothing wrong."

==== Barack Obama ====
On January 31, 2007, Biden took his first steps into the presidential campaign, but his comments about other candidates overshadowed his entrance. Biden especially drew criticism in the popular press for his evaluation of Senator Barack Obama; Biden was quoted in the New York Observer as saying: "I mean, you got the first mainstream African-American who is articulate and bright and clean and a nice-looking guy, ... I mean, that's a storybook, man." The audio of the interview, posted on the Observer's website, reportedly includes a significant pause after "African-American" which would drastically change the meaning of the statement. Biden sought to clear up the controversy by apologizing to Obama on the same day and repeated his regret on The Daily Show that same evening: "Look, the other part of this thing that got me in trouble is using the word clean. I should have said fresh." Some media observers labeled Biden's announcement a "launch pad disaster." Jonathan Darman of MSNBC commented: "If the gaffe does destroy Biden's chances, few in either party will be particularly surprised. The senator's biggest enemy has always been his own mouth ... He simply cannot control what comes out of his mouth."

The remark did much to undermine the start of Biden's campaign, and severely damaged his fund-raising ability. Despite this, Obama and Biden later boasted of "the closest relationship" of anyone to occupy the roles of president and Vice President of the United States, and this relationship has continued outside of their official offices within the White House.

== Political positions ==
Biden was considered to be a moderate liberal, clocking a 77.5 percent liberal voting record in 2006 and lifetime score of 76.8 percent. Biden was pro-choice on abortion rated 100% by NARAL and supported a state's right to have civil unions. He favored a balanced budget amendment and a rollback of the Bush tax cuts. He supported the PATRIOT Act and the war in Afghanistan, and voted in favor of authorization of military force into Iraq. He believed a political solution can be met in Iraq through federalization. Biden said he would favor American military intervention into Sudan to end the Darfur genocide. He supported Gun control and earning an F-Rating from Gun Owners of America and a 7% rating from the National Rifle Association of America. He opposed the No Child Left Behind Act although he voted in favor of it in 2002. Biden opposed capital punishment and supported the continuation of the war on drugs. In 2007, he voted in favor of the Comprehensive Immigration Reform Bill and supported a path to citizenship for illegal immigrants. Biden opposed oil drilling in the Arctic National Wildlife Refuge and said he believed that the government must take action against global warming.

== Aftermath ==
2008 Democratic Party Ticket
- Campaign: U.S. presidential–vice-presidential election, 2008
- Candidate: Joe Biden (vice-presidential); U.S. Senator (1973–2009)
- Affiliation: Democratic Party
- Status: Presumptive VP nominee: August 21, 2008; Official VP nominee: August 27, 2008; Elected VP: November 4, 2008; Inaugurated VP: January 20, 2009
- Headquarters: Chicago, Illinois
- Key people: Patti Solis Doyle (Chief of staff)
- Receipts: (2008-06-30)

Website
- www.barackobama.com

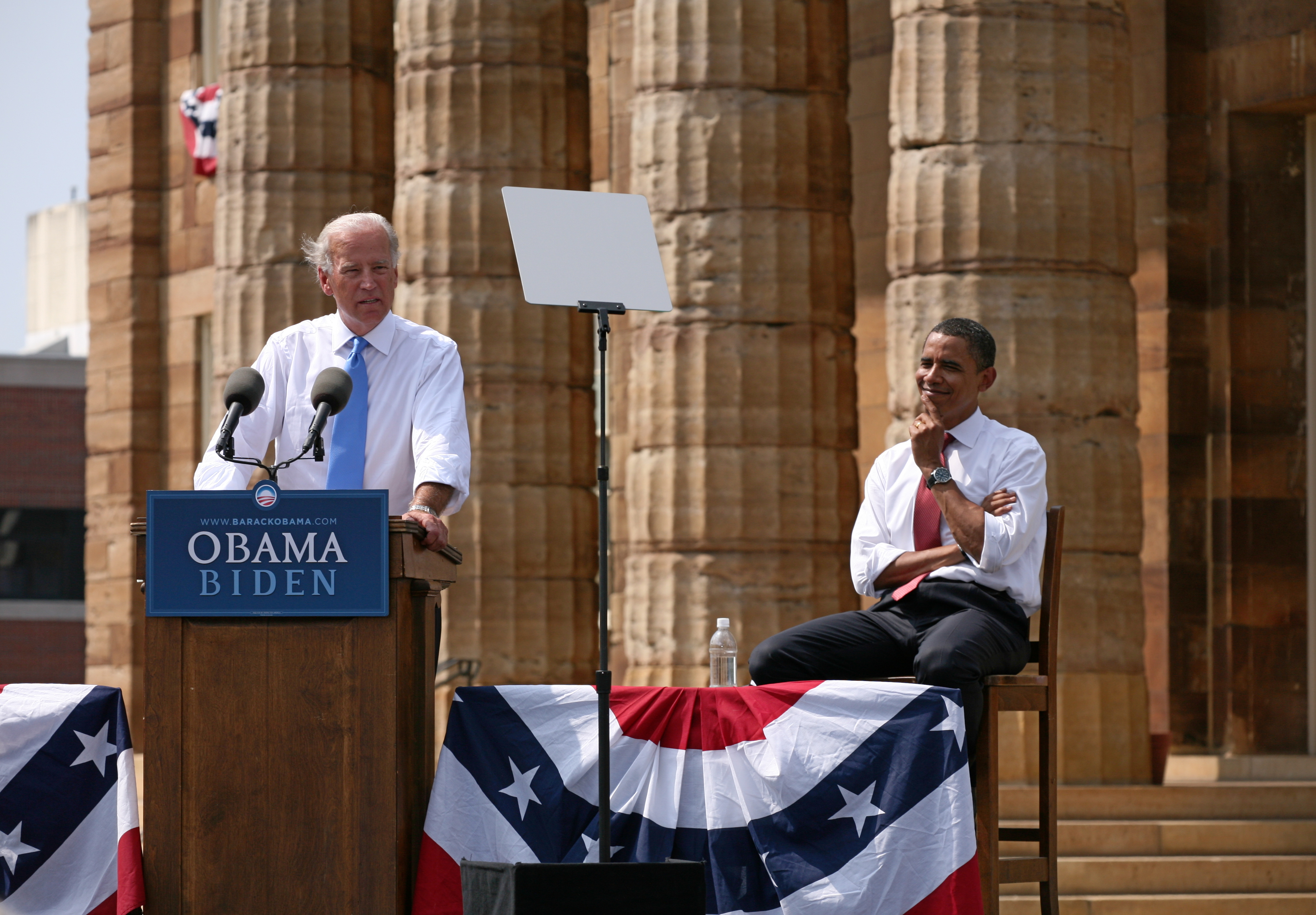
Biden's first speech after the announcement of his vice presidential candidacy

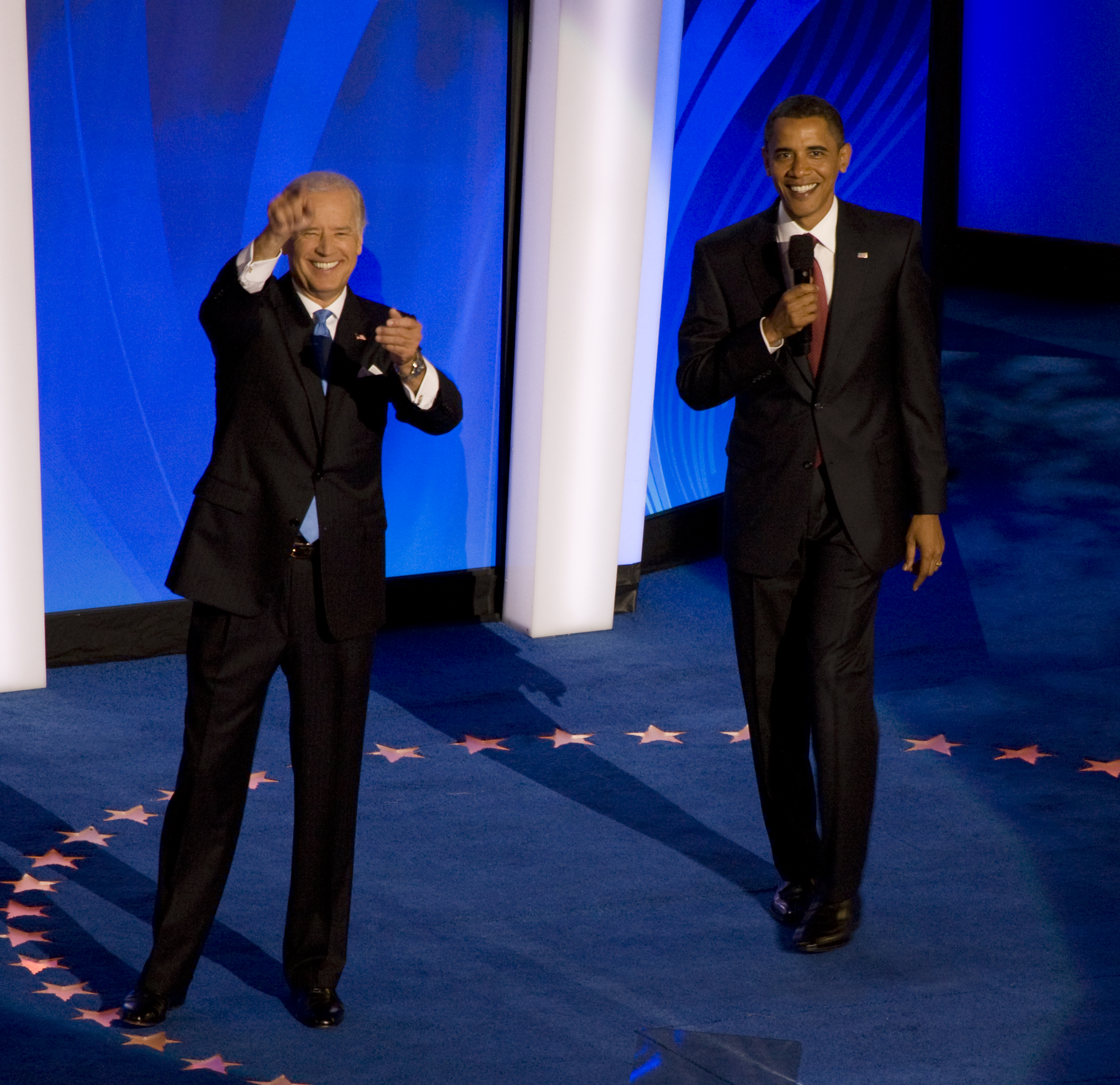
Obama and Biden appear together for the first time after accepting their party's nominations during the third night of the 2008 Democratic National Convention in Denver, Colorado.

While Biden's presidential campaign did not last beyond the first caucuses, he created a favorable impression during the debates and increased his stature among Washington politicos. In particular, Barack Obama changed his opinion of Biden, liking how he had handled himself at campaign stops and appreciating his appeal to working class voters.

On May 30, 2008, it was reported by The Washington Times that likely Democratic nominee Obama asked Biden to play a "more prominent" and "deeply involved" role in his campaign, with some speculating that Biden was on Obama's shortlist of vice presidential candidates. On August 23, 2008, the Obama campaign announced that Biden would become Barack Obama's running mate.

=== Obama–Biden ticket ===
Following U.S. Democratic presumptive presidential nominee Barack Obama's selection of Biden, the Senator's vice-presidential general election campaign began. During the campaign, he used his political experience to complement Obama, and debated Republican vice presidential nominee Sarah Palin. Biden was elected vice president on November 4, 2008, and sworn in on January 20, 2009.

=== FEC fine ===
On July 16, 2010, the Federal Election Commission fined the Biden presidential campaign $219,000 for campaign finance violations. The commission's audit revealed the campaign to have accepted contributions above the legal limit, to have failed to properly compensate for a 2007 jet ride, and to have issued checks that were never cashed. A Biden spokesperson said that "Some repayment is commonplace after presidential campaign audits and the repayment ordered here is relatively small. Payment is due to the Treasury 30 days after the FEC issues its formal ruling and 'Biden for President' will comply with that."

== See also ==
- Political positions of Joe Biden
- Joe Biden 1988 presidential campaign
- Joe Biden 2020 presidential campaign
- Joe Biden 2024 presidential campaign
- 2008 United States presidential election
