= David F. Schrader =

American politician

David Schrader
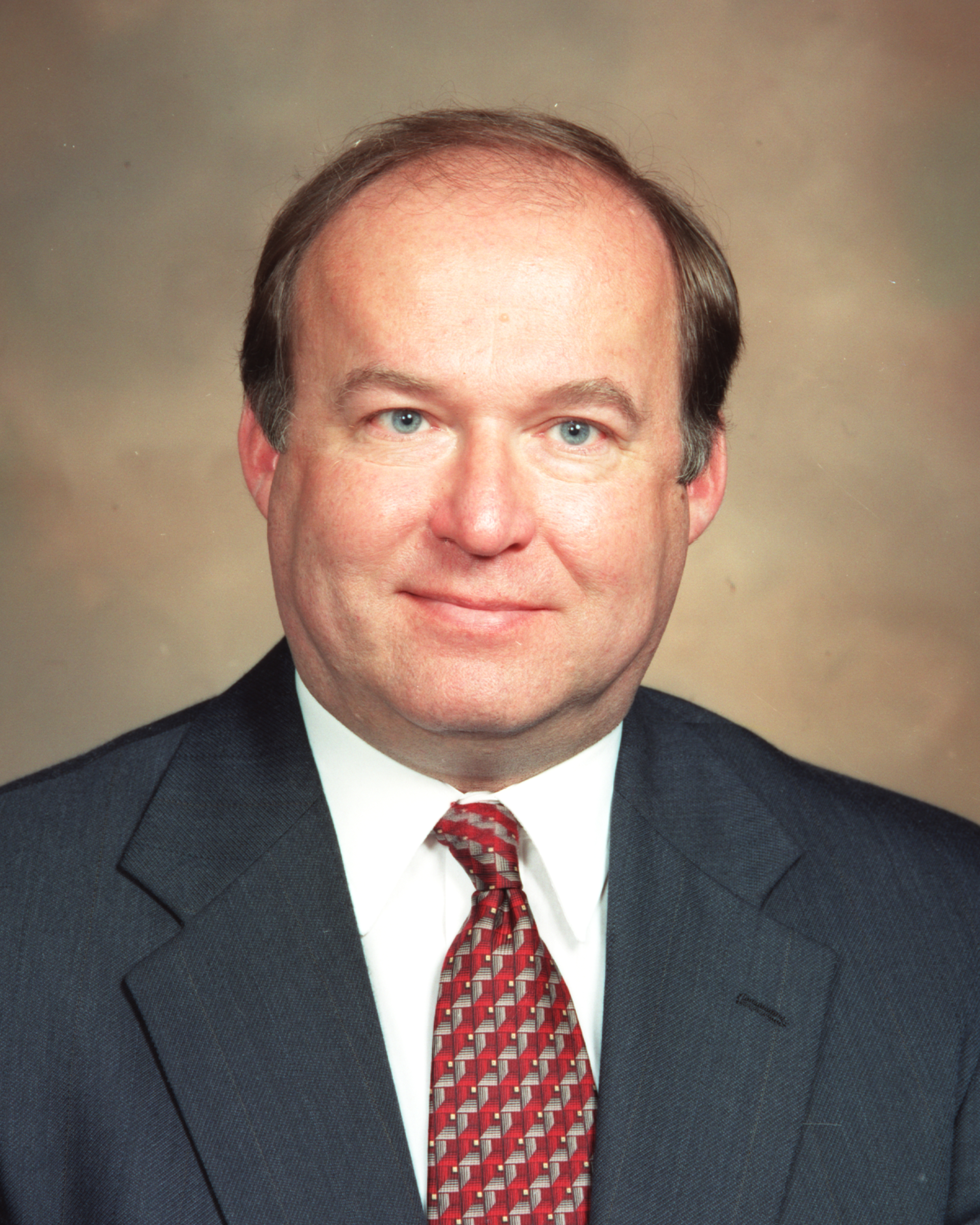

Member of the Iowa House of Representatives from the 90th district 69th (1987–1993)
- In office January 12, 1987 – January 12, 2003

Personal details
- Born: October 23, 1952 (age 73) Jasper County, Iowa, U.S.
- Party: Democratic
- Spouse: Bobbi Sterling
- Children: 4
- Occupation: Businessman

David F. Schrader (born October 23, 1952) is an American politician in the state of Iowa.

Schrader was born in Jasper County, Iowa. A Democrat, he served in the Iowa House of Representatives from 1987 to 2003 (69th district from 1987 to 1993 and 90th district from 1993 to 2003).
