= Erik Helland =

American politician (born 1980)

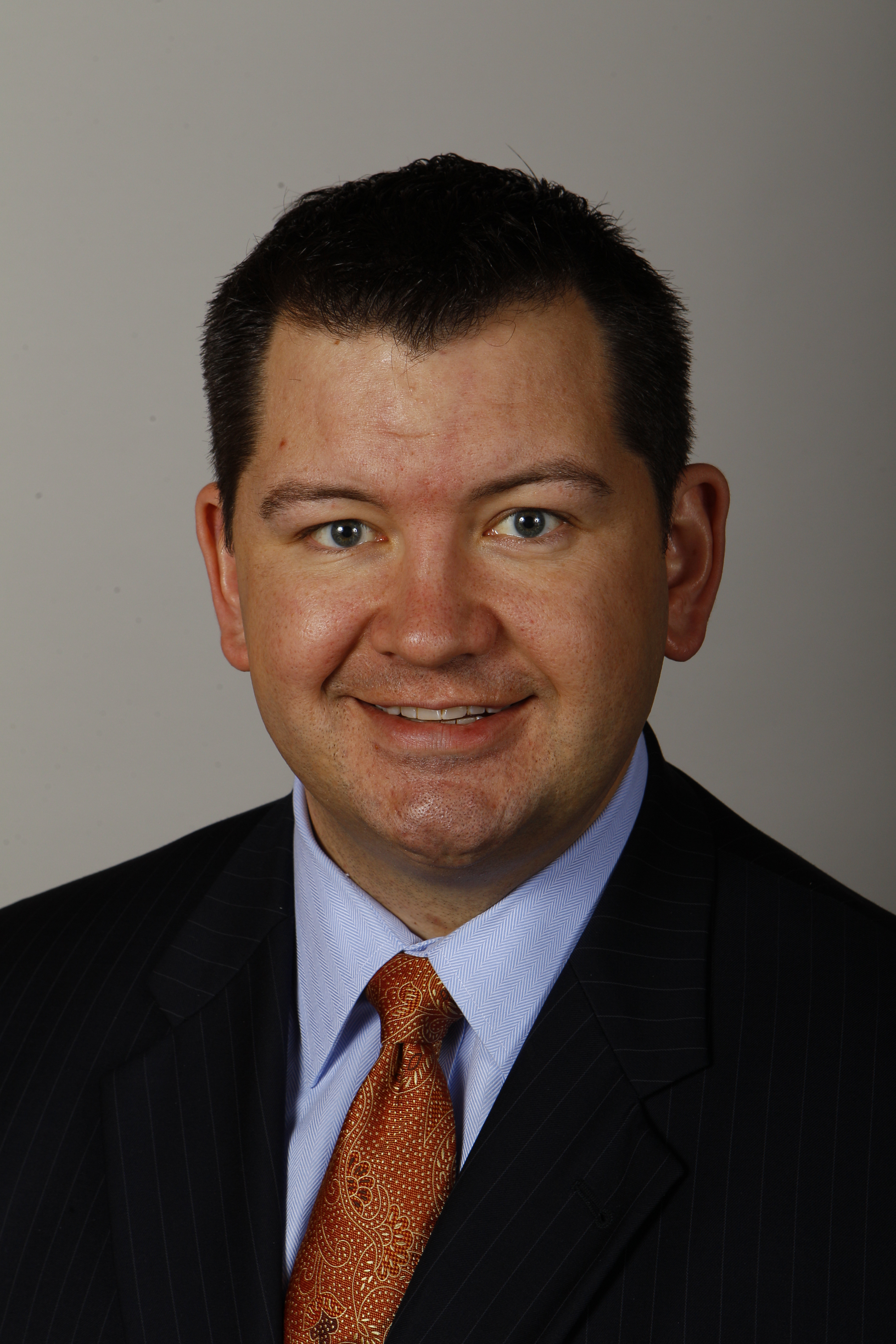

Member of the Iowa House of Representatives from the 69th district
- In office 2009–2013
- Preceded by: Walt Tomenga
- Succeeded by: Jake Highfill

Personal details
- Born: May 16, 1980 (age 46)
- Party: Republican
- Education: Drake University
- Occupation: Lawyer
- Website: Campaign Website

Erik Helland (born May 16, 1980) is a lawyer and a former Republican member of the Iowa House of Representatives (2008-2013). In 2023, Governor Kim Reynolds appointed him Chair of the Iowa Utilities Board.

== Early life and education ==
Erik Helland grew up on his family's farm. He graduated from Ballard High School and then went on to earn his undergraduate degree in biochemistry and molecular biology and his Juris Doctor from Drake University.

== Career ==
Helland worked for a bank as a compliance officer. and became an Iowa field staffer for John McCain's 2008 presidential campaign. In 2008, he decided to run to represent the 69th district in the Iowa House of Representatives, which includes Grimes, Johnston, Polk City, Saylorville, Alleman, Elkhart, and parts of Sheldahl, from 2009 to 2013. He was the state director for Tim Pawlenty's 2012 presidential campaign in Iowa. He faced Richard Sosalla in the general election and won with 61% of the vote. He was re-elected in 2010 without opposition. He was the Midwest political director for former New York Governor George Pataki's 21st Century Political Action Committee.

Helland was the Iowa state director for Tim Pawlenty's 2012 presidential campaign. He was also the majority whip in the Iowa House of Representatives. In 2012, he lost reelection in the Republican primary to Jake Highfill. His Committee assignments included Administration and Rules, Legislative Council, Local Government, State Government and Ways and Means.

Between 2013 and 2023 Helland ran a business, which deals with Medicaid appeals in Alaska. In 2020, Governor Kim Reynolds appointed him as a member to the Public Employment Relations Board until 2024, and in 2021, she appointed him as a chair to the Public Employment Relations Board until 2022. even though the Iowa Senate did not confirm him. State senators never voted on Helland's nomination, since the Governor withdrew his nomination at the end of the 2021 legislative session and "played musical chairs with"the Public Employment Relations Board. In 2023, Governor Kim Reynolds appointed him Chair of the Iowa Utilities Board.

== Electoral history ==
2012 Republican Primary for Iowa’s 69th House of Representatives District
Party	Candidate	Votes	%	±%
Republican	Jake Highfill	622	52.1	
Republican	Erik Helland	572	47.9	

2010 General Election for Iowa’s 69th House of Representatives District
Party	Candidate	Votes	%	±%
Republican	Erik Helland	14,681	100.0	

2008 General Election for Iowa’s 69th House of Representatives District
Party	Candidate	Votes	%	±%
Republican	Erik Helland	14,228	61.0	
Democratic	Richard Sosalla	9,111	39.0	

== Personal life ==
Helland is married. They live in Des Moines with their three children. He is a former president of the Grimes Lions club and a former board member of the Des Moines Young Variety. As of 2011, he attended St. Peter’s Lutheran Church.
