= Joe Biden 1988 presidential campaign =

American political campaign

Joe Biden for President 1988
- Campaign: 1988 Democratic primaries 1988 United States presidential election
- Candidate: Joe Biden; U.S. Senator from Delaware (1973-2009); Member of the New Castle County Council from the 4th district (1971–1973)
- Affiliation: Democratic Party
- Announced: June 9, 1987
- Suspended: September 23, 1987
- Key people: Doug Jones (co-chair); Tim Ridley (manager); Valerie Biden Owens (manager); Larry Rasky (press secretary); Ted Kaufman (treasurer); Pat Caddell (pollster/consultant)

The 1988 presidential campaign of Joe Biden, a Democratic U.S. Senator from Delaware, began in June 1987. At first, Biden was regarded as a strong candidate. In September 1987, however, reports emerged that he had plagiarized a speech by the British Leader of the Opposition and Labour Party Leader, Neil Kinnock. Allegations that Biden had engaged in plagiarism during law school and had exaggerated his academic record soon followed, and Biden withdrew from the race later that month.

Biden later served as the 47th vice president of the United States from 2009 to 2017 and as the 46th president of the United States from 2021 to 2025.

== Background ==
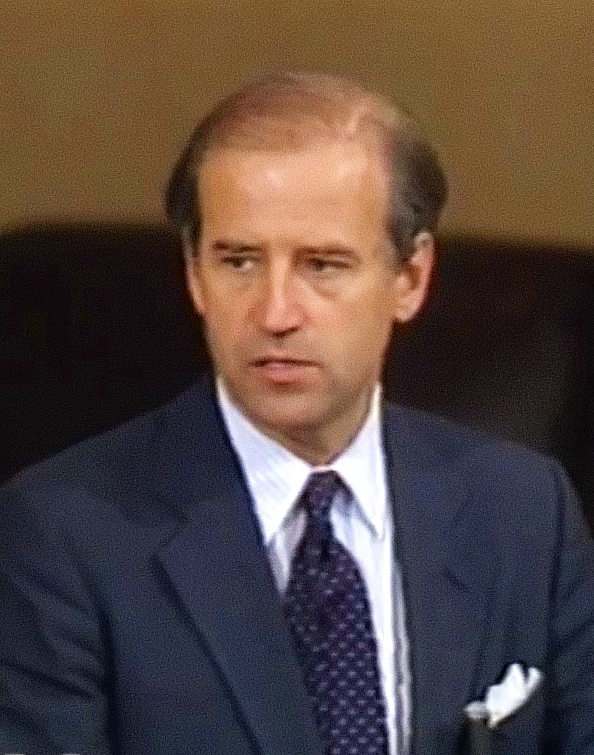
Biden in 1986

Biden had dreams of running for president since his college days. He had been mentioned among possible contenders in the 1984 presidential election. He had considered the notion in 1983, urged on by pollster Pat Caddell, who thought there was space for a young candidate. A fiery speech he gave to several Democratic audiences had simultaneously scolded Democrats for outdated thinking and encouraged them regarding future directions, and had gained him some notice in the party. However, Biden did not enter the race that season. Nonetheless, he won one vote at the 1984 Democratic National Convention.

Biden was active on the party speaking circuit from 1985 on, and was considered one of the best orators among the potential presidential candidates for 1988. The declared absence of Senator Ted Kennedy from the field, to whom Biden was sometimes compared, was also encouraging to a possible Biden candidacy.

Biden received considerable attention in the summer of 1986 when he excoriated Secretary of State George Shultz at a Senate hearing because of the Reagan administration's stance towards South Africa and its system of apartheid.

Biden was initially considered one of the strongest Democratic presidential candidates as campaigning began in 1987. This was because of his image as a political moderate, his speaking ability on the stump (rated second only to that of Jesse Jackson), his appeal to Baby Boomers, his high-profile position as chair of the Senate Judiciary Committee, looming for the Robert Bork confirmation hearings, and his fundraising appeal—his $1.7 million raised in the first quarter of 1987 was more than any other candidate. By the end of April he had raised $2 million, using not just contributions from Delaware but also establishing a base of support among young professionals and Jewish voters in a number of urban- and suburban-oriented states. He had no campaign debt, and Fortune magazine termed his "most impressive start" a "surprise".

When the campaign began, former Senator Gary Hart, who had made a strong nomination run four years earlier, was considered the clear front-runner. Indeed, The Wall Street Journal referred to the eight-person Democratic field as "Snow White and the Seven Dwarfs". However, Hart then withdrew from the race in May 1987, following revelations of his friendship with Donna Rice.

Despite this, Biden did not see a rise in his poll numbers immediately after the Hart withdrawal, and was particularly stagnant in polls for the Iowa caucuses. Nevertheless, Biden had confidence that he could prevail; on the eve of his announcement, he said: "I'm going to win this thing. I really am. I just know it, I can feel it in my fingertips." Some political professionals saw Biden as believing that he could simply will himself to win the race, but his continued ability to raise campaign funds gave him credibility as a candidate. However, later reports suggest that up until his announcement, Biden was actually unsure whether he wanted to run at all, and it took the urging of his wife Jill Biden to convince him to go forward.

== Campaign ==
=== Announcement ===
Announcement of Biden's official candidacy

At the age of 44, Biden formally declared his candidacy for the Democratic nomination for president of the United States at the Wilmington train station on June 9, 1987.

In his June 9 speech, Biden said that Americans should rise above "the mere accumulation of material things". In language intended to recall John F. Kennedy, he said, "For too long in this society, we have celebrated unrestrained individualism over common community. For too long as a nation, we have been lulled by the anthem of self-interest. For a decade, led by Ronald Reagan, self-aggrandizement has been the full-throated cry of this society: 'I've got mine so why don't you get yours' and 'What's in it for me?' ... We must rekindle the fire of idealism in our society, for nothing suffocates the promise of America more than unbounded cynicism and indifference."

Biden also laid out the platform he was running on, which included a middle stance between protectionism and free trade, opposition to the Reagan Strategic Defense Initiative, and support for child welfare, reduction of poverty, and the war against illegal drugs. Biden also emphasized the need for integrity in government.

=== Campaign staff and policy team ===
Biden's campaign manager was Tim Ridley (c.1955–2005), his press secretary was Larry Rasky (1951–2020), and his pollster and strategist was Pat Caddell (1950–2019). Biden's Senate chief-of-staff Ted Kaufman served as the campaign treasurer and principle fundraiser. John Marttila served as a political consultant and Thomas E. Donilon served as another strategist. Biden's sister Valerie Biden Owens also served a major role in running the campaign, as she had in all of his Senate campaigns, and was considered "first among equals" in making decisions. Future U.S. Senator Doug Jones, a longtime friend of Biden's, served as co-chair for the campaign.

=== Summer 1987 ===
Once underway, Biden's campaign messaging became confused due to staff rivalries and bickering. Four different themes were presented, sometimes simultaneously: "Pepsi Generation", "Voice of optimism", "Save the children", and "Scold the voters". Pollster Pat Caddell in particular was a disruptive force within the campaign, but he had been Biden's friend for fifteen years. Another of the themes was generational change; Biden hoped to inspire a new generation, as John F. Kennedy had inspired his. Indeed, Biden had a theory of presidential elections as a cycle, wherein there are candidates, such as he saw himself, who can bring with them large spurts of sometimes disruptive progress, followed by periods of adjustment in which voters prefer candidates who can "let America catch its breath."

However, the generational change theme was not catching on especially well. Biden was also hurt by his never having been a player in the Washington social scene. He would later write that his messaging had been "a bit opaque, like audiences were hearing me through a veil. ... I started looking at the race through the wrong prism. I looked around, judg[ing] myself against the other potential candidates for the nomination ..."

He received somewhat mixed notices for his performance in the first of the Democratic presidential primary debates, which was held at the Wortham Theater Center in Houston, Texas on July 1, 1987, during a special production of William F. Buckley's Firing Line program. Biden received audience applause for his energy policy in favor of domestic oil production, for his objections to what he called unfair trade practices of foreign countries, and for his criticisms of the Reagan administration's policies in Central America.

Biden was also suffering from having to divide his attention between the campaign, Senate responsibilities (including handling the Bork nomination), and family duties, but he campaigned intensively nonetheless. A profile at the time in the Dallas Morning News assessed him thusly: "He brings to the campaign an ingratiating manner and a quick wit with considerable Irish charm plus an ability to rouse audiences that few Democrats can match. But he also brings a reputation as a showboater and a hothead with a penchant for windiness." Such was his propensity to keep talking at campaign appearances that staffers gave reporters a note saying that "Senator may stray from prepared remarks". Then, as throughout his career, Biden was, as the New York Times later profiled, "a 'gut politician,' ... swaggering, ad-libbing, liable to get carried away in front of a crowd."

By August 1987, Biden's campaign had begun to lag behind those of Michael Dukakis and Richard Gephardt, although he had still raised more funds than all candidates but Dukakis, and was seeing an upturn in Iowa polls.

=== Kinnock controversy ===
Major controversy beset Biden's candidacy, beginning on September 12, 1987, with high-profile articles in The New York Times and The Des Moines Register. Biden was accused of plagiarizing a speech by Neil Kinnock, leader of the British Labour Party. Kinnock's speech, delivered to a Welsh Labour Party conference on May 15, 1987, and then rebroadcast during the UK 1987 general election, made reference to his background and that of his wife Glenys. It included the lines:

Why am I the first Kinnock in a thousand generations to be able to get to university? [Pointing to his wife in the audience:] Why is Glenys the first woman in her family in a thousand generations to be able to get to university? Was it because all our predecessors were thick?

Biden's speech made reference to himself and his wife Jill, and included the lines:

I started thinking as I was coming over here, why is it that Joe Biden is the first in his family ever to go to a university? [Pointing to his wife in the audience:] Why is it that my wife who is sitting out there in the audience is the first in her family to ever go to college? Is it because our fathers and mothers were not bright? Is it because I'm the first Biden in a thousand generations to get a college and a graduate degree that I was smarter than the rest?

Biden went on to duplicate other parts of Kinnock's speech, such as their forebears' ability to read and write poetry, their strength in working for hours underground in a mine only to come up and play football afterward, and their being limited by lack of a "platform" upon which to stand.

Biden had in fact cited Kinnock as the source for the formulation on previous occasions. However, he made no reference to the original source at the August 23 Democratic debate at the Iowa State Fair being reported on, nor in an August 26 interview for the National Education Association. Moreover, while political speeches often appropriate ideas and language from each other, Biden's use came under more scrutiny because he fabricated aspects of his own family's background in order to match Kinnock's.

Following the Kinnock attention, reports came from the San Jose Mercury News of Biden giving a February 3, 1987, speech to the California Democratic Party that reused without credit passages from a 1967 speech by Robert F. Kennedy, and of Biden giving 1985 and 1986 speeches that did the same with a passage from a 1976 speech by Hubert H. Humphrey. In the Kennedy case – which got the greater attention, since there was film footage of both versions that television news programs could play side-by-side – Pat Caddell stated that the reuse without credit was his own fault, and that he had never informed Biden of the source of the material. It was also reported that the California speech had taken a short phrase from the 1961 inaugural address of John F. Kennedy.

After Biden withdrew from the race, it came to light that he had indeed correctly credited Kinnock on other occasions. However, in the Iowa speech that was recorded and distributed to reporters (with a parallel video of Kinnock) by aides to Michael Dukakis, the eventual nominee, he failed to do so. Dukakis, who disowned any knowledge of the Kinnock video, fired John Sasso, his campaign manager and long-time Chief of Staff, but Biden's campaign could not recover.

=== Academic revelations ===
During the Kinnock controversy, there was discussion of an incident during Biden's first year at Syracuse University School of Law in 1965. Biden initially received an "F" in an introductory class on legal methodology for writing a paper relying almost exclusively on a single Fordham Law Review article, which he had cited only once. Biden was allowed to repeat the course and passed with high marks. Though the then-dean of the law school, as well as Biden's former professor, downplayed the incident, they did find that Biden drew "chunks of heavy legal prose directly from" the article in question. Biden said it was inadvertent due to his not knowing the proper rules of citation. After ending his presidential campaign, Biden requested the Board of Professional Responsibility of the Delaware Supreme Court review the issue. The Board concluded on December 21, 1987, after Biden had withdrawn, that the senator had not violated any rules, although Biden did not release this result until May 1989.

When questioned by a New Hampshire resident about his grades in law school, Biden replied "I think I probably have a much higher IQ than you do, I suspect," and then had lied saying that he had graduated in the "top half" of his class, that he had attended law school on a full scholarship, and had received three degrees in college. In fact, he had earned a single B.A. with a double major in history and political science, and had received a half scholarship to law school based on financial need with some additional assistance based in part upon academics, and had graduated 76th out of 85 in his law school class. During this time, Biden also released his undergraduate grades, which were unexceptional.

=== Youth activism ===
Before and during the campaign, Biden had a tendency to invent a past as a marcher in the Civil Rights Movement. For instance, in a February 1987 speech in New Hampshire, he said, "When I marched in the civil rights movement, I did not march with a 12-point program. I marched with tens of thousands of others to change attitudes. And we changed attitudes." Statements of this nature had been made by Biden going back to at least 1983. Such statements concerned campaign advisors, who knew they did not represent a truthful recollection of Biden's past; Biden said he understood, but continued to make them.

Following the Kinnock and academic revelations, reporters pressed Biden on the matter. Biden acknowledged that his activities were actually limited to one summer job incident, where while working as a lifeguard at a swimming pool, he learned of racial inequality issues and joined black lifeguards in establishing a picket line around a local movie theater that had a segregation policy. Biden said, "The civil-rights movement was an awakening for me, not as a consequence of my participation but as a consequence of my being made aware of what was happening." Speaking to reporters, he objected to this line of questions as a whole, saying, "I find y'all going back and saying, 'Well, where were you, Senator Biden, at the time?' – you know, I think it's bizarre. ... Other people marched. I ran for office."

=== Withdrawal ===
On September 17, 1987, Biden held a press conference at the United States Capitol in an attempt to address these questions and put the issues behind him. He acknowledged that "I've done some dumb things, and I'll do dumb things again." However, he vowed to stay in the race regardless. A number of Biden's senate colleagues supported him regarding the controversies, including longtime Democratic fixture Robert C. Byrd and Republican Alan Simpson, who quoted Theodore Roosevelt's "The Man in the Arena" speech.

However, the Kinnock and academic revelations were magnified by the limited amount of other news about the nomination race at the time, when most of the public were not yet paying attention to any of the campaigns; Biden thus fell into what Washington Post writer Paul Taylor described as that year's trend, a "trial by media ordeal". As Valerie Biden Owens later said, "It was a tsunami." Biden lacked a strong demographic or political group of support to help him survive the crisis. The controversy also hit Biden in his most vulnerable area, accentuating the notion that he lacked mental and verbal discipline.

Biden withdrew from the nomination race on September 23, 1987, saying his candidacy had been overrun by "the exaggerated shadow" of his past mistakes. His formal campaign had lasted only three and a half months.

== Aftermath ==
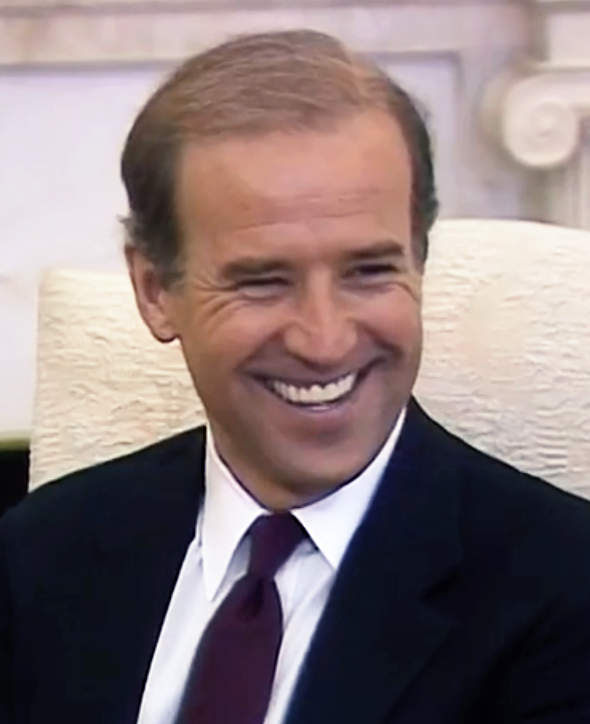
Biden in November 1987, shortly after his withdrawal

Massachusetts Governor Michael Dukakis went on to win the Democratic presidential nomination. He was defeated in the general election by Republican Vice President George H.W. Bush.

In retrospect, Biden took the blame for his mistakes during the campaign. On one, he said, "All I had to say was 'Like Kinnock.' If I'd just said those two words, 'Like Kinnock,' and I didn't. It was my fault, nobody else's fault." On another, he ruefully recalled, "'Hey pal, you want to compare IQs?' What an immature thing to say."

Biden experienced health challenges during parts of the campaign, suffering repeated headaches. In September 1987, he had to halt a speech in New Hampshire for 15 minutes after feeling faint. In February 1988, he suffered the first of two brain aneurysms that required life-saving surgery and seven months away from the Senate in order to convalesce. Biden and others would speculate that had his campaign not ended early, the aneurysms might have been more severe or detected later and that he might not have lived out the year.

Biden did not seek the presidency again until 2008. This time, he made it to the Iowa caucuses, but withdrew after a poor showing. Meanwhile, Biden and Kinnock had become close friends after the plagiarism incident. During 1988, Biden and his son Beau had visited Kinnock in Britain, with Kinnock later saying they "got on like a house on fire", calling him "good company and [...] one of the good fellas." Meeting again in August 2008, after Biden had been chosen by Democratic nominee Barack Obama as his running mate, Biden introduced Kinnock to his Senate staff by saying: "Hey, you people! Do you know this guy? He used to be my greatest speechwriter." Obama and Biden proceeded to win the general election against the Republican ticket of John McCain and Sarah Palin. Biden's 1988 campaign lapses were never a significant issue in the race, and Biden invited Kinnock to the inauguration.

On April 25, 2019, Biden announced that he would run for president in 2020. As the Democratic frontrunner, the failures of his 1988 bid again received scrutiny. Biden won the Democratic nomination, defeated incumbent President Donald Trump in the general election, and was inaugurated as the 46th President of the United States on January 20, 2021.
