= Kirsten Running-Marquardt =

American politician (born 1977)

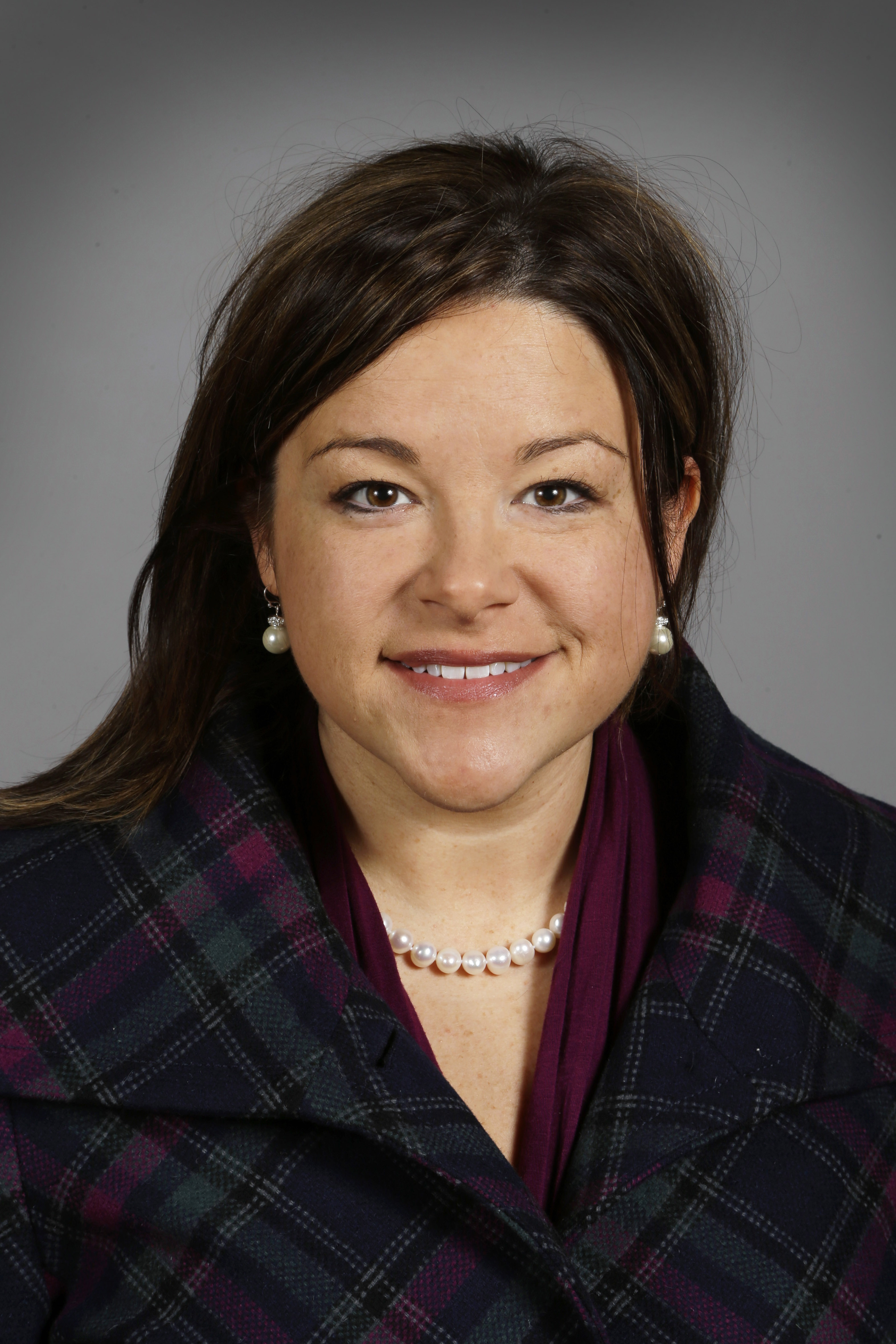

Member of the Iowa House of Representatives from the 69th district 33rd (2009–2013)
- In office 2009–2023
- Preceded by: Dick Taylor
- Succeeded by: Tom Determann

Personal details
- Born: July 6, 1977 (age 49)
- Party: Democratic
- Spouse: Coy
- Education: University of Iowa

Kirsten Running-Marquardt (born July 6, 1977) is a former Democratic Iowa State Representative, elected to represent the 33rd District in the Iowa House of Representatives in a special election in November 2009. She replaced Dick Taylor, who resigned in October 2009 to focus on his family.

As of October 2011, Running-Marquardt serves on several committees in the Iowa House - the Appropriations, Economic Growth/Rebuild Iowa, Labor, and Local Government committees. She also serves as the ranking member of the Economic Development Appropriations Subcommittee.

== Electoral history ==
Running-Marquardt was first elected on November 24, 2009 for the remainder of retiring Representative Dick Taylor's term. She won the election, defeating Republican opponent Joshua Thurston. She won re-election in a 2010 re-match with Thurston. *incumbent

Election	Political result	Candidate	Party	Votes	%
Iowa House of Representatives special elections, 2009; District 33; Turnout: 1,954	Democratic hold	Kirsten Running-Marquardt	Democratic	1,527	78.1
Iowa House of Representatives special elections, 2009; District 33; Turnout: 1,954	Democratic hold	Joshua Thurston	Republican	420	21.5
Iowa House of Representatives elections, 2010; District 33; Turnout: 8,905	Democratic hold	Kirsten Running-Marquardt*	Democratic	5,364	60.2
Iowa House of Representatives elections, 2010; District 33; Turnout: 8,905	Democratic hold	Josh Thurston	Republican	3,067	34.4

Iowa House of Representatives
Preceded by Dick Taylor	33rd District; 2009 – 2013	Succeeded by
Preceded by	69th District; 2013 – 2023	Succeeded by Tom Determann
