= Kent A. Kramer =

American politician

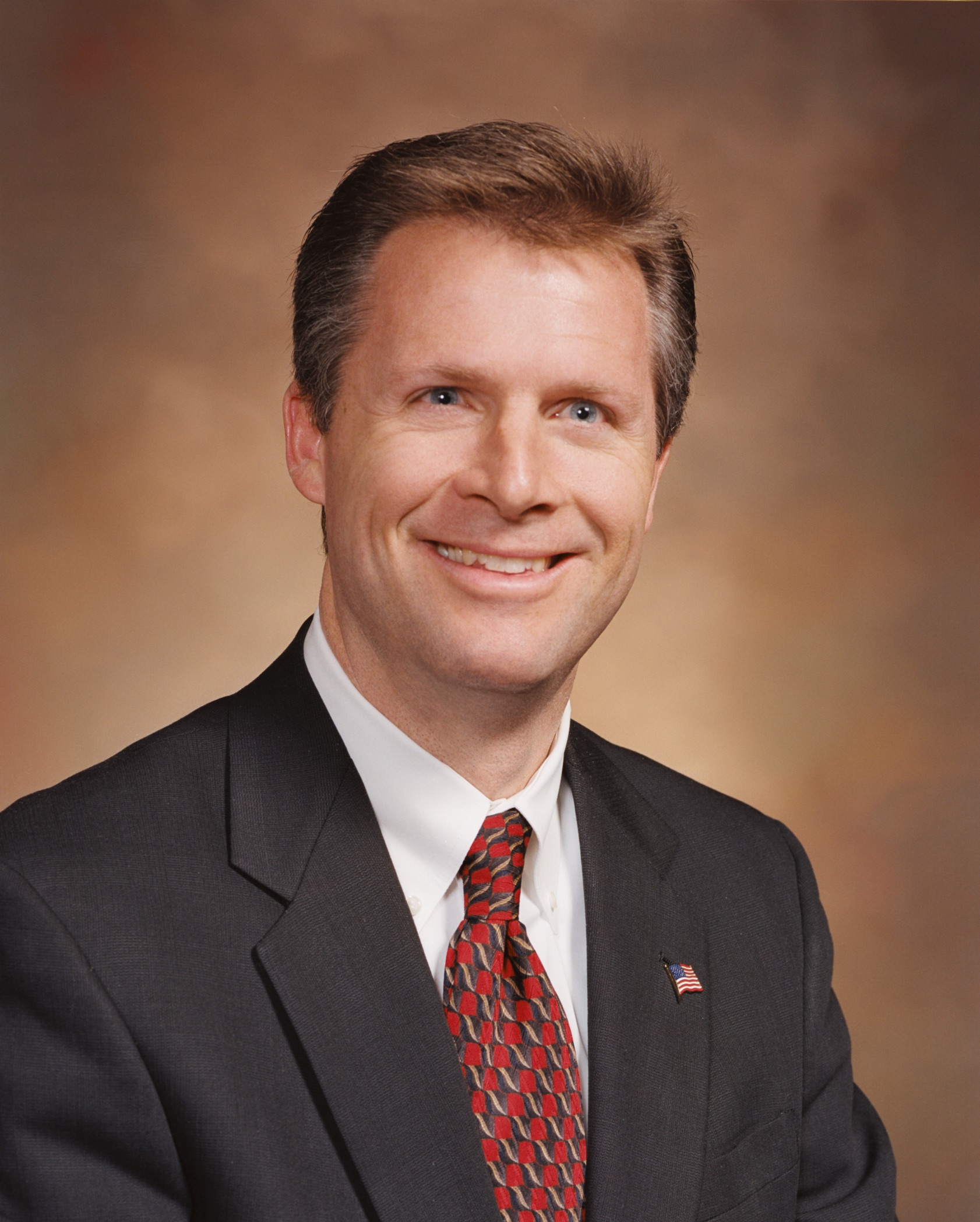

Member of the Iowa House of Representatives
- In office January 13, 2003 – January 9, 2005

Personal details
- Born: November 21, 1961 (age 64) Newton, Iowa, United States
- Party: Republican
- Spouse: Kimberly
- Children: four
- Occupation: financial planner

Kent A. Kramer (born November 21, 1961) is an American politician in the state of Iowa.

Kramer was born in Newton, Iowa. He attended the University of Iowa and is a financial planner. A Republican, he served in the Iowa House of Representatives from 2003 to 2005 (69th district).
