= Dick Taylor (Iowa politician) =

American politician (1931–2023)

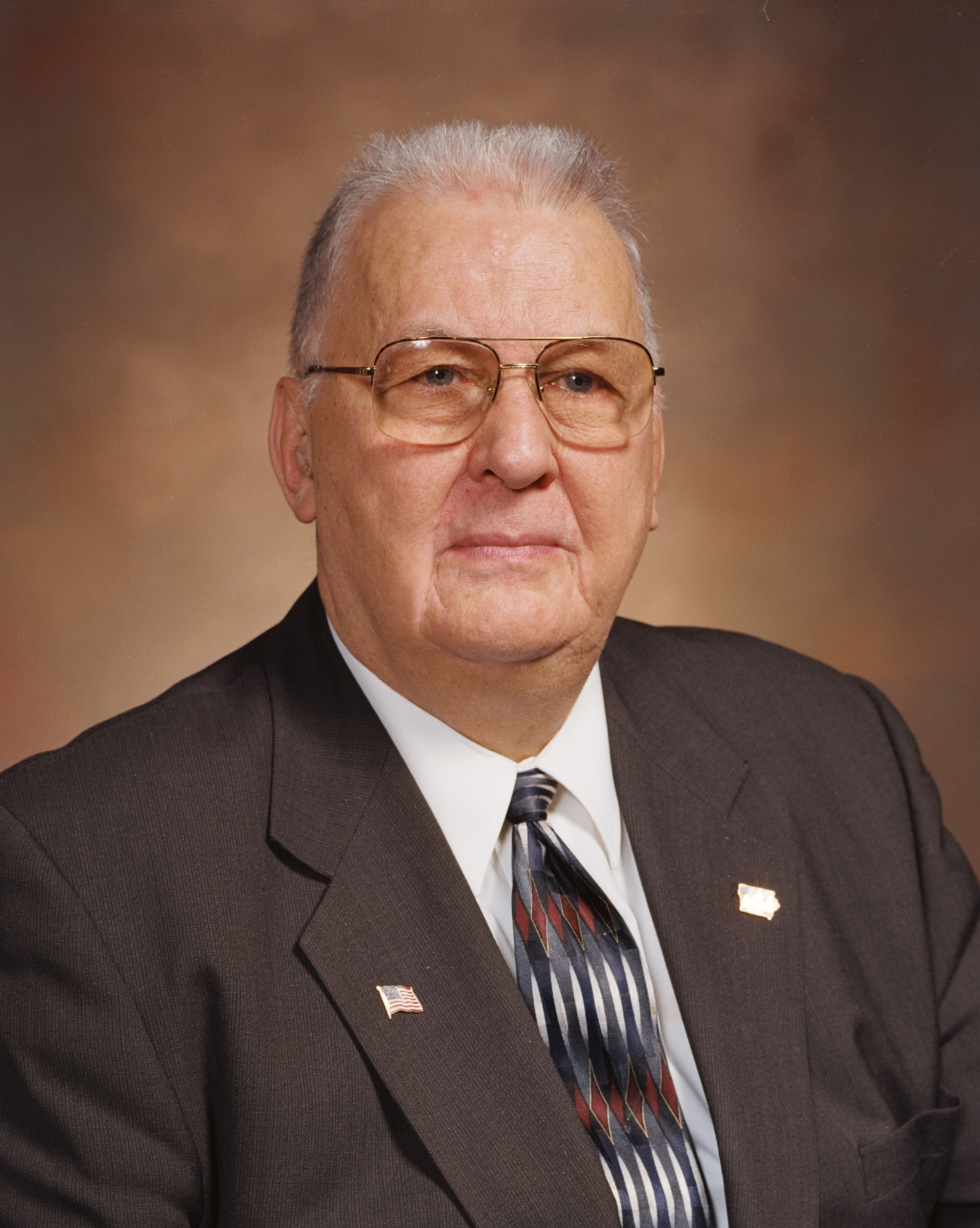

Member of the Iowa House of Representatives from the 33rd district 53rd (2000 – 2003)
- In office 2000 – October 14, 2009
- Preceded by: Kay Chapman
- Succeeded by: Kirsten Running-Marquardt

Personal details
- Born: April 5, 1931 Algona, Iowa, U.S.
- Died: September 17, 2020 (aged 89) Cedar Rapids, Iowa, U.S.
- Party: Democratic
- Spouse: Jan
- Children: two
- Occupation: Retired electrician/electrical project manager
- Website: Taylor's website

Richard D. Taylor (April 5, 1931 – September 17, 2020) was an American politician who was an Iowa State Representative from the 53rd and 33rd Districts. He served in the Iowa House of Representatives from 2000 to 2009. He resigned in October 2009 because of family health concerns.

Prior to serving in the Iowa House, Taylor served in the United States Navy and was an electrician. Taylor served on the Robins, Iowa City Council.

During his last term in office, Taylor served on several committees in the Iowa House - the Commerce, Local Government, and Veterans Affairs committees. He also served on the Natural Resources Committee, where he was vice chair, and on the Justice System Appropriations Subcommittee. Earlier in his term, until November 2007, he served as vice chair of the Veterans Affairs Committee.

Taylor was first elected to House District 53 in a January 4, 2000 special election following fellow Democrat Kay Chapman's resignation. The unusual, early date of the election meant that voter registration deadline was on Christmas and the county auditor's office had to be open on New Year's Day (both public holidays). After the district lines were redrawn for the 2002 election, he represented the new District 53. He resigned from office on October 14, 2009 and was succeeded by fellow Democrat Kirsten Running-Marquardt.

Taylor died in Cedar Rapids, Iowa on September 17, 2020, at the age of 89.

== Electoral history ==
*incumbent

Election	Political result	Candidate	Party	Votes	%
Iowa House of Representatives special election, 2000; District 53; Turnout: 1,912	Democratic hold	Dick Taylor	Democratic	1,013	53.0
Iowa House of Representatives special election, 2000; District 53; Turnout: 1,912	Democratic hold	Andy Hasley	Republican	896	46.9
Iowa House of Representatives elections, 2000; District 53	Democratic hold	Dick Taylor*	Democratic	unopposed	
Iowa House of Representatives elections, 2002; District 33; Turnout: 7,762	Democratic (newly redistricted)	Dick Taylor*	Democratic	4,718	60.8
Iowa House of Representatives elections, 2002; District 33; Turnout: 7,762	Democratic (newly redistricted)	Nancy L. Bruner	Republican	2,805	36.1
Iowa House of Representatives elections, 2002; District 33; Turnout: 7,762	Democratic (newly redistricted)	Tammy Kaye Simon	Green	238	3.1
Iowa House of Representatives elections, 2004; District 33	Democratic hold	Dick Taylor*	Democratic	unopposed	
Iowa House of Representatives elections, 2006; District 33	Democratic hold	Dick Taylor*	Democratic	unopposed	
Iowa House of Representatives elections, 2008; District 33; Turnout: 13,295	Democratic hold	Dick Taylor*	Democratic	9,273	69.7
Iowa House of Representatives elections, 2008; District 33; Turnout: 13,295	Democratic hold	Kathy Potts	Republican	3,996	30.1

Iowa House of Representatives
Preceded by Kay Chapman	53rd District; 2000 – 2003	Succeeded by Dan Huseman
Preceded by Paul Scherrman	33rd District; 2003 – 2009	Succeeded by Kirsten Running-Marquardt
