= Delaware Department of Services for Children, Youth, and Their Families =

State agency of Delaware, United States

The Delaware Department of Services for Children, Youth, and Their Families (DSCYF) is a state agency of Delaware. It has its headquarters in the Delaware Youth and Family Center (DYFC), located in unincorporated New Castle County, near Wilmington.

== Division of Youth Rehabilitative Services ==
The Division of Youth Rehabilitative Services (DYRS) operates juvenile correctional facilities.

The division has some pretrial facilities. The New Castle County Detention Center (NCCDC) is a 64 bed secure pretrial facility. It is Building 12 at the 963 Centre Road complex in unincorporated New Castle County. The William Marion Stevenson House Detention Center, which houses 55 pretrial children, is located in Milford.

The Ferris School for Boys, with capacity for 80 boys, is the secure facility for adjudicated males. The Ferris School, which opened in 1997, is located in unincorporated New Castle County. The Mowlds Cottage is a transition program for juveniles who are about to re-enter the free world, as well as juveniles who are committed for a short period of time. The Grace and Snowden Cottages are facilities for adjudicated females, and males, respectively. The three cottages are in the 1825 Faulkland Road complex in unincorporated New Castle County.

Male juveniles of ages 16 through 18 who are sentenced as adults by the Delaware Superior Court or who are found "non-amenable" by a Delaware family court are held in the Young Criminal Offenders Program (YCOP) in the Delaware Department of Correction Howard R. Young Correctional Institution in Wilmington. The YCOP can hold 40 boys and is segregated from the adult male population.
