= Ashley Biden =

American social worker and fashion designer (born 1981)

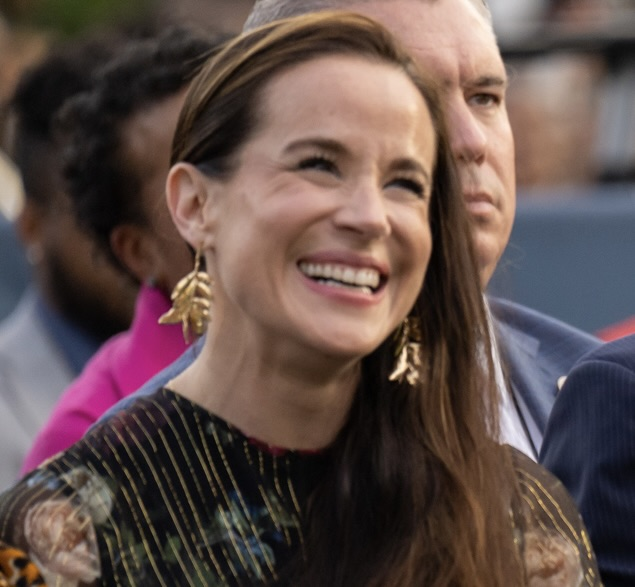
- Biden in 2023
- Born: Ashley Blazer Biden; June 8, 1981 (age 45); Wilmington, Delaware, U.S.
- Education: Tulane University (BA); University of Pennsylvania (MSW)
- Occupations: Social worker; activist; fashion designer
- Organization: Livelihood
- Political party: Democratic
- Spouse: Howard Krein (m. 2012; sep. 2025)
- Parents: Joe Biden; Jill Biden
- Family: Biden family

Ashley Blazer Biden (born June 8, 1981) is an American social worker, activist, and fashion designer. She served as the executive director of the Delaware Center for Justice from 2014 to 2019. Before her administrative role at the center, Biden worked in the Delaware Department of Services for Children, Youth, and Their Families. She founded the fashion company Livelihood, which partners with the online retailer Gilt Groupe to raise money for community programs focused on eliminating income inequality in the United States, launching it at New York Fashion Week in 2017. Biden's parents are former U.S. president Joe Biden and former U.S. first lady Jill Biden.

== Early life and family ==
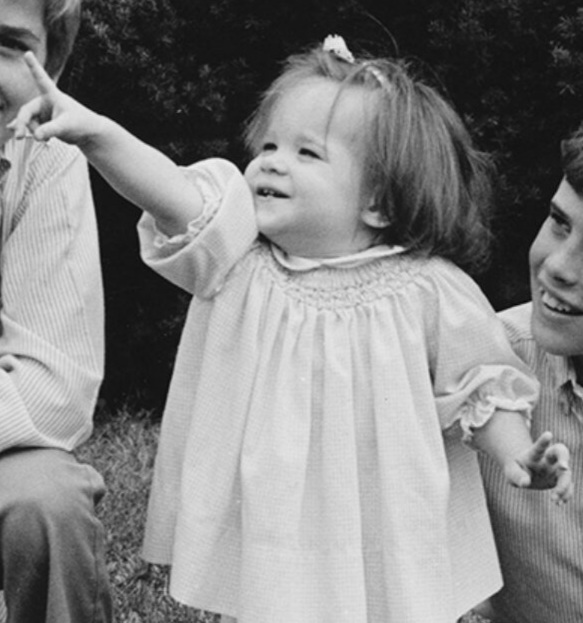
Ashley Biden

Ashley Blazer Biden was born on June 8, 1981, in Wilmington, Delaware, to Jill Biden, a teacher, and Joe Biden, a U.S. senator. She is the half-sister of Beau Biden, Hunter Biden and Naomi Biden, her father's children from his first marriage to Neilia Hunter. Biden is a great-great-granddaughter of Pennsylvania state senator Edward Francis Blewitt. She is of English, French and Irish descent on her father's side and Italian (Sicilian), Scottish and English descent on her mother's side.

Biden was raised in the Catholic faith and was baptized at St. Joseph's on the Brandywine in Greenville, Delaware. During her childhood, her father served as a United States Senator from Delaware and her mother worked as an educator.

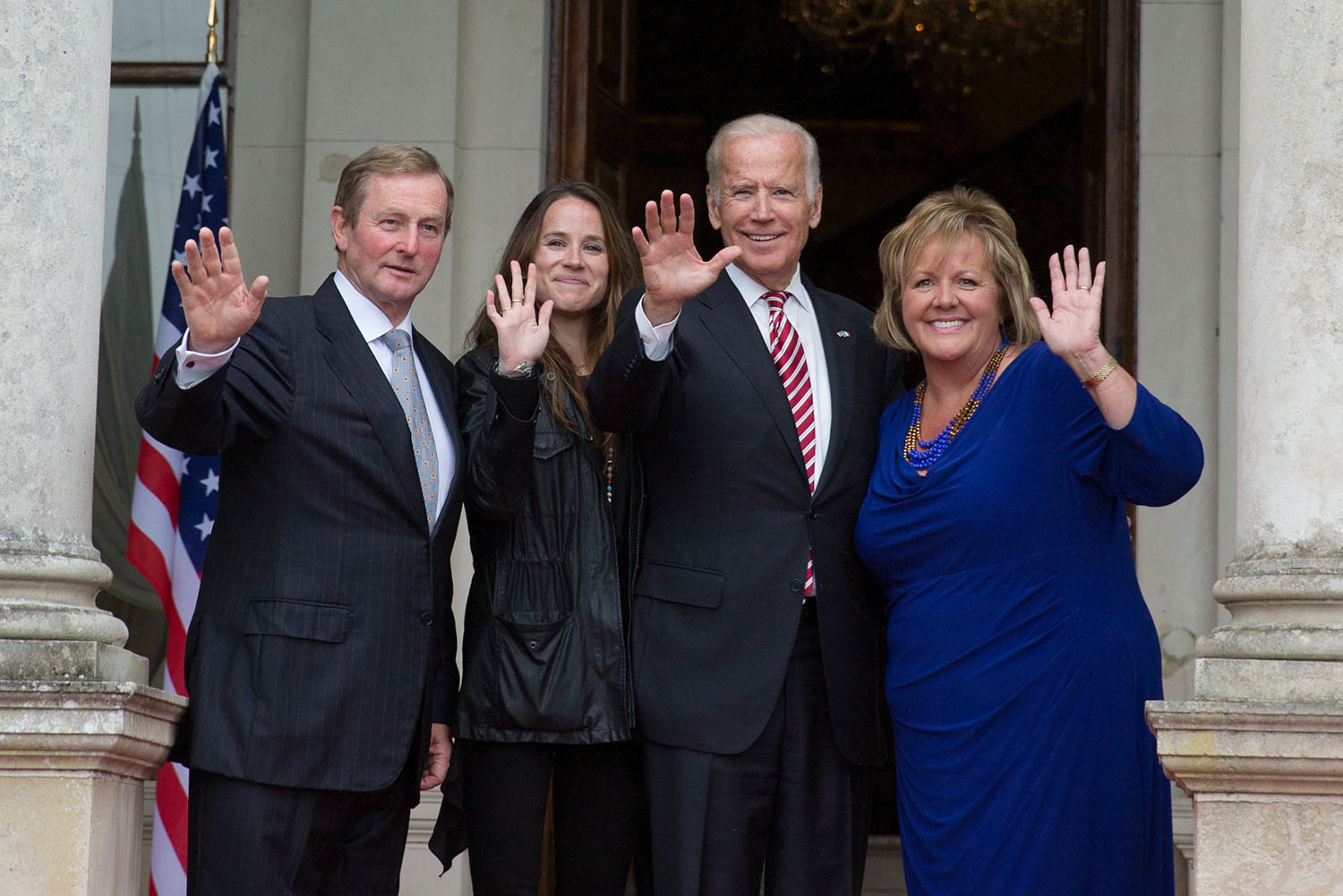
Enda Kenny, Ashley Biden, Joe Biden, and Fionnuala Kenny at Farmleigh in Dublin in 2016

Biden attended Wilmington Friends School, a private school run by the Religious Society of Friends in Wilmington. She was on her school's lacrosse and field hockey teams. When Biden was in elementary school, she discovered that the cosmetics company Bonne Bell tested its products on animals. She wrote a letter to the company asking them to change their policy on animal testing. She later got involved in dolphin conservation, inspiring her father to work with Congresswoman Barbara Boxer to write and pass the 1990 Dolphin Protection Consumer Information Act. Biden made an appearance before members of the United States Congress to lobby for the legislation.

She graduated from Archmere Academy in Claymont, Delaware, in 1999.

== Education and career ==
Biden studied cultural anthropology at Tulane University. During her first year of college, she worked at Girls Incorporated, now Kingswood Academy, as a camp counselor. She also interned at a summer program at Georgetown University, working with youth from Anacostia. After college, Biden worked as a waitress at a pizza shop in Wilmington for a few months before starting her career in social work. She moved to Kensington, Philadelphia, and started a job as a clinical support specialist at the Northwestern Human Services Children's Reach Clinic, assisting youth and their families with accessing resources and working directly with psychiatrists and therapists. She obtained a master's of social work degree from University of Pennsylvania's School of Social Policy and Practice in 2010. She was one of twelve graduates who received the John Hope Franklin Combating American Racism Award.

=== Social work and activism ===
Biden is a social justice activist and social worker who has worked extensively in Delaware. She served at the Delaware Department of Services for Children, Youth, and Their Families for 15 years, creating programs for youth in juvenile justice, foster care, and mental health. In 2008 she was listed in Delaware Today's "40 People to Watch" for her work in the department. Later, she joined the Delaware Center for Justice, focusing on criminal justice reform and establishing programs on public education, adult victim services, gun violence, and more. She also implemented a program called SWAGG to combat violent crimes and gang activity among youth.

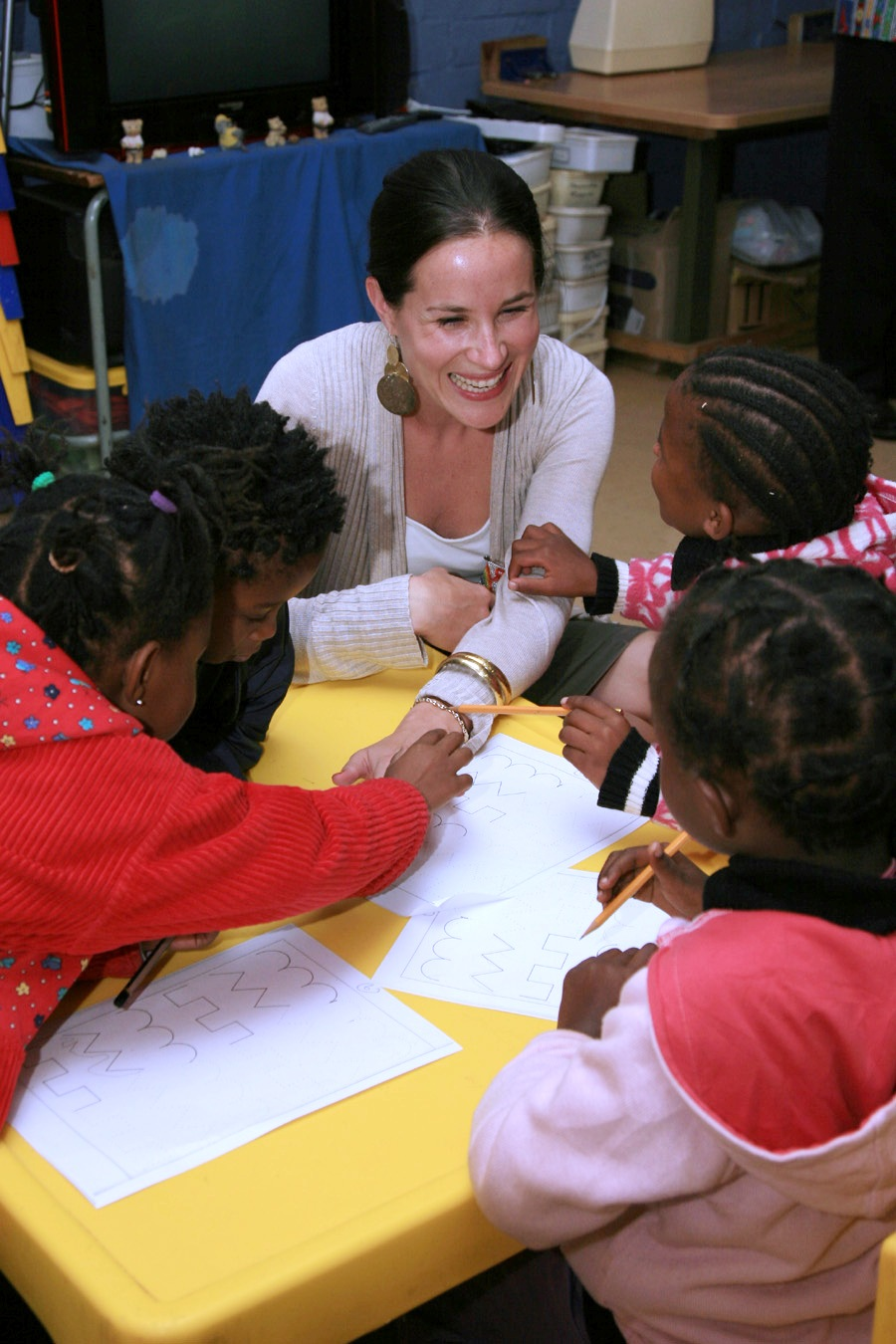
Biden playing with children at the Mapetla Day Care Centre in Soweto, South Africa, during an official visit in June 2010

In 2014, Biden criticized the death penalty, stating that it is not cost effective and wastes resources that could go towards victim services and crime prevention.

She founded the Young@Art program that provides resources and outlets for students to create artwork while they are detained in detention facilities, and then sells the art in the community. Half of the proceeds of the art go directly to the artists, and the other half goes into funding the program to buy art supplies and to pay the wages of youth who work at the community art shows. Through the program, Biden also teaches the students business and financial literacy skills.

=== Fashion ===
In 2017, Biden launched the Livelihood Collection, an ethical fashion clothing brand, at Spring Place in TriBeCa during New York Fashion Week. The launch event was attended by Biden's parents and celebrities including Olivia Palermo and Christian Siriano. The brand collaborated with Gilt Groupe and Aubrey Plaza to raise $30,000 for the Delaware Community Foundation. Livelihood's logo, an arrow piercing through the letters "LH", was inspired by Biden's half-brother Beau, who died of brain cancer in 2015. Biden stated that "[Beau] was my bow. His cancer brought me to my knees. I had no choice but to shoot forward, keep going, keep aiming at my own dreams."

Biden created the brand to help combat income inequality and racial inequality in the United States. All the proceeds from the brand launch at New York Fashion Week were allocated to programs for communities in need. Ten percent of the brand's continued sales are donated to community organizations in the Anacostia neighborhood of Washington, D.C., and the Riverside in Wilmington. Livelihood's products are made with American-sourced organic cotton and are manufactured in the United States. She decided to design hoodies due to their connection to the Labor Movement, and their symbolic significance toward social justice movements. The brand's website provides information about civic engagement and economic justice.

Along with Colleen Atwood, Barbara Tfank, Rachel Zoe, Bibhu Mohapatra, Betsey Johnson, Calvin Klein, Oscar de la Renta, Anna Sui, Paul Tazewell, and other designers and fashion houses, Biden designed outfits for 12-inch vinyl dolls of the Peanuts characters Snoopy and Belle for the 2017 Snoopy and Belle in Fashion exhibition. The exhibition kicked off on September 7, 2017, at Brookfield Place in Manhattan. It toured in San Diego, Los Angeles, and several other cities throughout the United States before closing on October 1, 2017.

In June 2020, Biden designed the uniforms for the staff at the Hamilton Hotel in Washington, D.C., as an offshoot of her Livelihood Collection The uniforms were unveiled at a private launch party. The hotel donated $15,000 to Livelihood.

=== Role in father's campaign ===
In August 2020, Biden spoke at the 2020 Democratic National Convention before her father accepted the 2020 Democratic Presidential Nomination. On August 6, Biden hosted an organizing event for Wisconsin Women for Biden to discuss the Women's Agenda, released by her father's campaign, and bring awareness to women's issues in the 2020 presidential election.

== Personal life ==
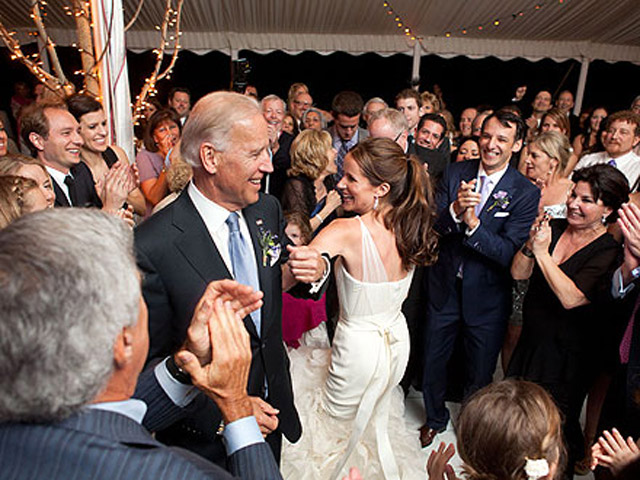
Biden and her father dancing the hora at her wedding reception

In 2010, she began dating Howard Krein, a plastic surgeon and otolaryngologist, after her brother Beau introduced them. They married in a Catholic-Jewish interfaith ceremony at St. Joseph's on the Brandywine in 2012. Krein works at Thomas Jefferson University Hospital and as an assistant professor of facial, plastic, and reconstructive surgery at Thomas Jefferson University. On August 11, 2025, it was revealed that Biden filed for divorce from Krein in a Philadelphia court.

Biden is a practicing Catholic. She joined her husband, father, and brother in a private audience with Pope Francis in the Vatican in 2016.

=== Victim of diary theft ===
In 2020, Biden's personal diary was stolen and sold to the far-right activist group Project Veritas. Two Florida residents admitted in federal court in 2022 to having stolen the diary as well as other personal items from Biden, transporting the items across state lines, and selling them to Project Veritas. In early April 2024, Aimee Harris was sentenced to a month in prison, starting in July, and three months of home confinement; her co-defendant, Robert Kurlander, would be sentenced in the future.

Biden acknowledged that the diary was hers in an April 2024 letter to The New York Times, but added that her writings on it had been "constantly distorted and manipulated". A page from the diary describing "showers with my dad (probably not appropriate)" was widely publicized.
