= List of law enforcement agencies in Delaware =

This is a list of law enforcement agencies in the state of Delaware.

According to the US Bureau of Justice Statistics' 2008 Census of State and Local Law Enforcement Agencies, the state had 49 law enforcement agencies employing 2,131 sworn police officers, about 243 for each 100,000 residents.

== State agencies ==
- Delaware Animal Services
- Delaware Division of Alcohol and Tobacco Enforcement
- Delaware Capitol Police
- Delaware Department of Correction
  - Delaware State Probation and Parole
- Delaware Department of Justice
  - Criminal Division
- Delaware Department of Natural Resources and Environmental Control
  - Environmental Protection Officers
  - Fish & Wildlife Natural Resources Police Officers
  - Parks & Recreation Natural Resources Police Officers (State Park Rangers)
- Delaware Office of Animal Welfare (State Animal Control Officers)
- Delaware State Police
- Delaware Office of the Fire Marshal
- Delaware Justice of the Peace Court Constables

== County agencies ==
- New Castle County Police Department
- New Castle County Sheriff's Office
- Kent County Sheriff's Office
- Sussex County Sheriff's Office

== Municipal agencies ==
- Bethany Beach Police Department
- Blades Police Department
- Bridgeville Police Department
- Camden Police Department
- Cheswold Police Department
- Clayton Police Department
- Dagsboro Police Department
- Delaware City Police Department
- Delmar Police Department
- Dewey Beach Police Department
- Dover Police Department
- Ellendale Police Department
- Elsmere Police Department
- Felton Police Department
- Fenwick Island Police Department
- Frederica Police Department
- Georgetown Police Department
- Greenwood Police Department
- Harrington Police Department
- Kenton Police Department
- Laurel Police Department
- Lewes Police Department
- Middletown Police Department
- Milford Police Department
- Millsboro Police Department
- Milton Police Department
- New Castle City Police Department
- Newark Police Department
- Newport Police Department
- Ocean View Police Department
- Rehoboth Beach Police Department
- Seaford Police Department
- Selbyville Police Department
- Smyrna Police Department
- South Bethany Police Department
- Townsend Police Department
- Wilmington Police Department
- Wyoming Police Department

== University agencies ==
- Delaware State University Police Department
- Delaware Technical Community College Public Safety Department
- University of Delaware Police Department
- Wilmington University Public Safety & Constables

== Other agencies ==
- Bayhealth Medical Center Constable
- Christiana Care Health System Department of Public Safety Constables
- Beebe Healthcare Department of Public Safety
- Nemours Alfred I. duPont Hospital for Children Department of Public Safety Constables
- Tower Hill School Constables
- Delaware River and Bay Authority Police Department
- Recovery Innovations (Newark and Ellendale) [Constables]
- Port of Wilmington Harbor Police Department
- Delaware Metropolitan Transit Authority Constables and Public Safety
- Department of Veterans Affairs Police, Wilmington Delaware.
