= Krein =

Krein (Russian: Крейн) is a surname. Notable people with the surname include:

- Alexander Krein (1883–1951), Soviet composer
- Howard Krein, American plastic surgeon and business executive
- Mark Krein (1907–1989), Ukrainian-Soviet mathematician
