= List of homeless encampment sweeps in the United States =

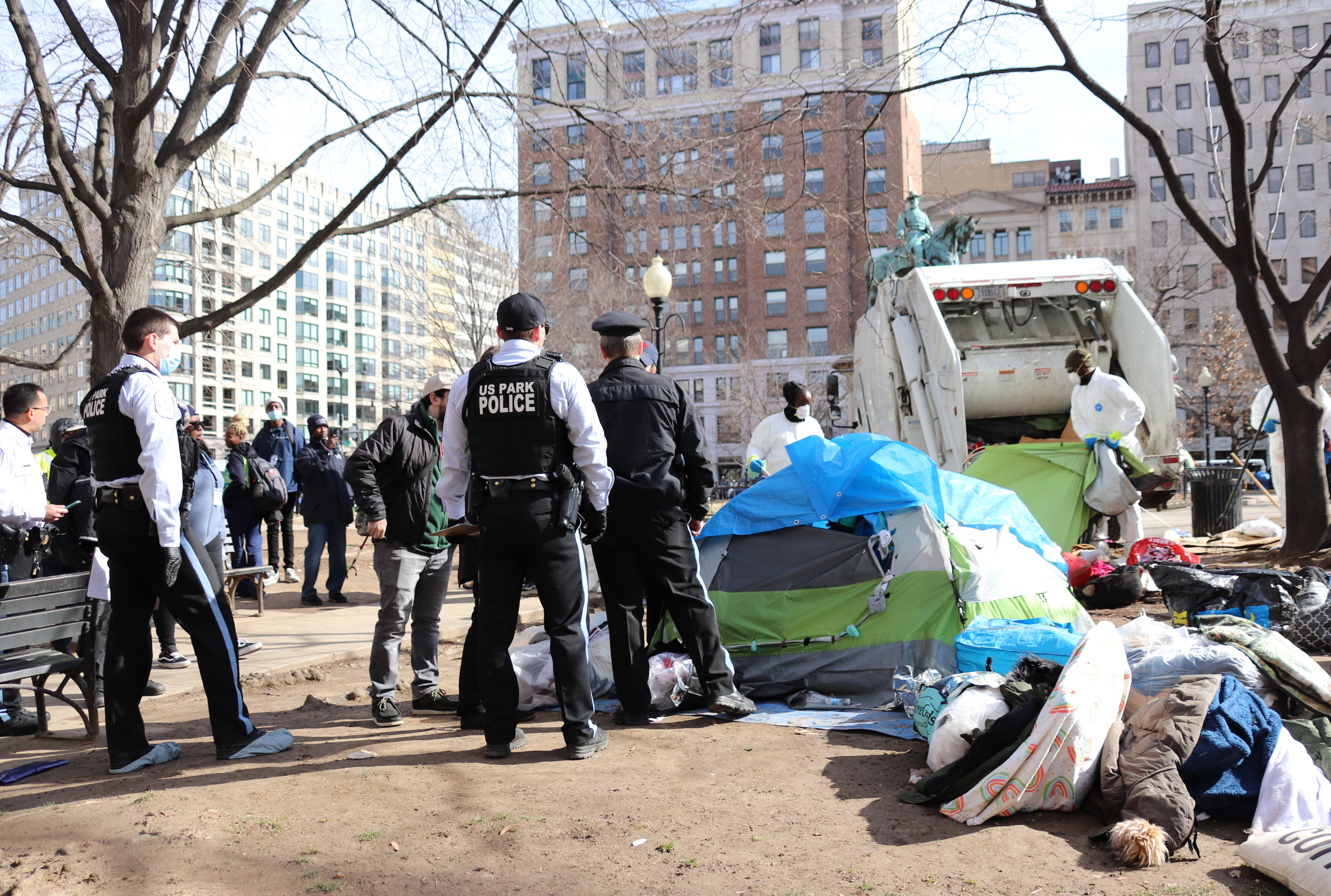
The National Park Service sweeps an encampment in Washington, DC.

In response to the impact of homelessness in their communities, municipal governments in the United States regularly conduct sweeps of tent encampments, forcibly dispersing people from public or private land where they are camping without authorization. This is a partial list of homeless encampment sweeps in the United States, focused on sweeps that have gotten national or regional coverage.

== Alabama ==
In August 2022, a 13 year old encampment near the Lowe's in Tillmans Corner attracted the attention of city officials and law enforcement. City officials attempted to avoid a "heavy handed" approach initially by recruiting volunteers to clean the encampment, but it remained inhabited. In September, the city sent an outreach team to clear the encampment of its inhabitants and Lowe's hired a crew to remove people's belongings as well as the trees on the property that made it a desirable place to camp. Two months later, an encampment formed in Crestview Park.

In October 2022, Mobile cleared an encampment near I-65 to allow for a bridge inspection. In November 2022 police cleared two encampments under highway overpasses in Montgomery.

In September 2024, a fire in Huntsville at a sanctioned encampment on Derrick Street that houses between 100 and 200 people in total displaced between 10 and 24 people. In October, the city announced plans to relocate around 80 people living at the site in order to "reset" conditions at the site.

In December 2024, Birmingham public works employees cleared a longstanding encampment covering much of the exterior of a warehouse building near Railroad Park.

== Alaska ==
In September 2017, Juneau police cleared a downtown encampment.

In April 2020, the Anchorage Assembly passed a resolution to more aggressively clear the city's homeless encampments. The city began sweeping encampments along Chester Creek and downtown that month. In June 2022, Anchorage cleared an encampment of 25 to 50 people in Davis Park, in the Mountain View neighborhood. In October 2023, Anchorage cleared its largest encampment. That winter, a record 51 people died on the city streets.

In June 2024, Anchorage police cleared an encampment on Second Avenue. In July, following the passage of Grants Pass v. Johnson, the city escalated its efforts to sweep encampments, taking down an encampment of 41 tents, RVs, cars and trucks being used as shelter on Fairbanks Street following a shooting and repeated complaints from the city's business interests. By the next week, another encampment had formed nearby on 33rd Avenue.

== Arizona ==
In the 2020s a large encampment developed in downtown Phoenix. The area between 9th and 15th streets and Washington and Jefferson avenues became known as "The Zone" and at its peak in May 2022 housed as many as 1,000 people. Police swept the encampment, displacing 700 to 900 people in November 2023. 500 people were placed in shelter beds and motels. Both the harsh conditions of The Zone, particularly the lack of shelter from the urban heat, and the sweeps of the city's downtown which forced people to congregate in The Zone, were criticized by the ACLU of Arizona in a 2022 lawsuit. The city swept more than 3,000 encampments in 2022, and 1,200 in 2019.

In May 2024, Tucson began clearing encampments in the 100 Acre Wood, beginning with a spot selected by Davis-Monthan Air Force Base for PFAS testing.

== Arkansas ==
=== Fayetteville ===
In September 2018, the University of Arkansas cleared a 60-acre lot of land it owned, forcing around 100 people to disperse. In 2020, the university cleared another encampment along its bike path in south Fayetteville. In June 2025, the university again cleared an encampment on its property along 19th Street, adjacent to two homeless shelters that were over capacity. Fayetteville's Forgotten, a group advocating for the encampment's residents, said that more than 300 people would be displaced by the sweep, and that local homeless services organizations did not have the capacity to serve all those displaced. The sweep began on June 9, after a notice of encampment clearance was posted on the site. Advocacy groups said that the encampment sweep scattered residents and disconnected them from services and the community that kept them safe and on a path to recovering from homelessness. In the aftermath of the sweep, Fayetteville city council member Sarah Moore introduced a resolution that called for a year-round, 40-person managed encampment. The estimated cost of the program was $630,000. 7Hills Homeless Center opposed the bill. The legislation failed on a 5-3 vote.

=== Little Rock ===
In November 2022, the Arkansas Department of Transportation removed encampments in Little Rock near highways and interstates. In March 2023, the DOT removed another Little Rock encampment with bulldozers. In February 2024, the city bulldozed an encampment along Roosevelt road without warning, displacing its residents including a wheelchair-using man who was not able to accept a shelter bed due to his disability.

== California ==
Police cleared hundreds of encampments from Seventeenth Street in the East Village of San Diego in 2017.

In 2021, Los Angeles relocated 200 people from encampments on Venice Beach. The Los Angeles Sanitation Department responded to 4,000 requests a month regarding encampments at the end of 2022.

The city of Fresno swept an encampment of around 25 people in April 2022.

In July 2023, the city of Antioch announced a five-year, $2.3 million on-call encampment removal contract with a ServiceMaster franchise. In April 2024 more than 100 people living in 70 vehicles were removed from Wilbur Avenue.

In November 2023, Governor Gavin Newsom announced an allocation of $300 million by the state of California to clear encampments near highways. Between July 2021 and November 2023, the state of California cleared 5,679 encampments.

In July 2023, the city of San Diego enacted a ban on camping "within two blocks of schools and shelters, in parks and along waterways." The city saw a 45% decline in the presence of unhoused people downtown, with more than 1,200 people removed from the area. In June 2024 San Diego County was sued for the improper removal of people's personal belongings and valuables during encampment sweeps.

In July 2024, Gavin Newsom issued an executive order directing California state agencies to remove "dangerous" encampments on state land.

=== Sonoma County ===
In June 2020, Santa Rosa police swept several large encampments under Highway 101 underpasses in the city, and 16 people were arrested. While these sweeps were ongoing, Sonoma County officials closed the Joe Rodota trail for maintenance to prevent the formation of another encampment there.

In March 2021, a homeless woman was killed when a man deliberately rammed his car into a small encampment on Roberts Avenue in south-central Santa Rosa.

In July 2021, a group of business owners cleared a downtown Guerneville encampment in an unsanctioned enforcement action. They brought water and supplies to the encampment and loaded and unloaded residents' belongings, relocating them to a Park and Ride parking lot outside of town. Residents said they felt coerced to leave the encampment and that the vigilantes had thrown away some of their medications and essential belongings. The relocated encampment of 30 people was swept by police in August.

In September 2021, Rohnert Park police cleared an encampment on a city owned commuter lot. The camp had grown in size after Caltrans and Burlington Coat Factory cleared encampments on their properties. In February 2022, the city moved around 30 people from an encampment along Roberts Lake Road back to the same city owned lot nearby, making it the first sanctioned encampment in the city's history. The city set up fencing around the lot and said it planned to provide toilets and sanitation to residents.

==== Joe Rodota Trail ====
A small encampment named Camp Michela after a homeless single mother who was murdered in 2012 was established in Roseland behind the Dollar Tree on Sebastopol Road with the approval of the Sonoma County Community Development Commission in November 2015, and relations were initially harmonious with the local community. In December 2015, police began using electric motorcycles to patrol the trail. They ordered a small encampment in the bushes of the Santa Rosa Creek to disperse, after having displaced those same campers from an area near the railroad tracks days earlier. Following the housing losses of the Tubbs Fire, the Joe Rodota Trail became the site of a major homeless encampment located nearby Stony Point Road, which was the largest in Sonoma County history. In April 2018, authorities began dismantling Camp Michela. At the time of the eviction, about 75 people lived at the encampment, down from a peak of 140 people. The residents were evicted because the Community Development Commission planned to build mixed-use housing and a commercial hub on the property. Sixty percent of the people the Roseland encampment relocated to the Joe Rodota Trail. Police began sweeping encampments on the trail in May. On 30 May police swept a half-mile stretch of the trail that had 89 tents and campsites. Campers said they would convene a summit to decide where to go next. On 21 June, several dozen people, mostly women, who were encamped along the trail near Roberts Avenue were forced to move. A property manager said their eviction was authorized so that the site could be developed with a mix of market rate and affordable housing. A person whose daughter lived at the encampment was charged with trespassing while cooking for its residents.

By October 2019, an encampment had re-emerged on another part of the trail with over 100 tents. As of December 2019, the encampment had encompassed over one mile of the trail and had over 220 homeless inhabitants, which steadily increased over the several months prior. An article from the San Francisco Chronicle put an estimation of 300 homeless residents, which accounted for approximately ten percent of Sonoma County's homeless population at the time. Incidents such as fires and arson took place in the encampment three times in a span of two months from November 2019 to January 2020, including a tank explosion on New Year's Eve 2019. In January 2020, the camp was swept in violation of a court order requiring beds for all the inhabitants. The city began dismantling the encampment after building 30 shelter cabins in another location, despite more than 200 people living at the camp. Several people protested the sweep. The Sonoma County Board of Supervisors approved a plan to provide housing for some of the homeless campers, in a $11.63 million leasing that would provide at least six units for at least twenty people. Around 100 refugees from the camp filtered out into other areas of Santa Rosa, establishing smaller encampments at the Piner Road Skatepark and on a pasture off West Robles Road.

In April 2022, officials again closed sections of the Joe Rodota Trail from Roberts Avenue to North Dutton Avenue and from North Dutton to Roseland Avenue to clear an encampment on nearby private property. A larger encampment on the trail between Dutton and Roseland avenues and another near South Wright Road was faced with sweeps in July 2022, but a judge granted a temporary injunction on enforcement actions due to a lack of available beds in the county. In January 2023, Sonoma County renewed its efforts to clear encampments on the trail, displacing around 50 people living there. Authorities continued to sweep encampments on the trail through March 2023, moving 70 to 100 people to a city-sanctioned encampment on the county's administrative campus. Crews closed portions of the trail to clean it after completing the sweeps. In October 2023, Caltrans cleared another section of the trail between Dutton Avenue and the Highway 12 overpass, displacing between 60 and 70 people. In 2024, officials erased an unofficial memorial to homeless people who had died in Sonoma county which was painted on rocks at the site where the encampment used to be encampment by a former resident, who was threatened with arrest when trying to seek a compromise with police and parks employees.

=== Berkeley ===
In the late 2000s, people began to take notice of encampments in People's Park in Berkeley. Increasing numbers of people began camping on the land, which had long been a site of political contestation, during the COVID-19 pandemic. In January 2021, plans to conduct soil testing by the University of California Berkeley led to student protests over concerns that around 50 people living in the park would be evicted if the university moved forward with its plans to construct student housing. Some people encamped on the site reported having their belongings removed by police. Protestors occupied the park in February in an attempt to halt any further displacement. They tore down the fences surrounding the property and sabotaged construction equipment.

In August 2022, police and contractors again began fencing off People's Park. Protestors gathered in the park before dawn and some were arrested. By mid-afternoon, police and contractors had retreated amid growing pressure from protestors. Fences were torn down and construction equipment was sabotaged again. On 5 August, the California First District Court of Appeal upheld a stay on construction, demolition and tree-cutting while allowing the university to fence off the area.

In the early morning hours on 4 January 2024, at least 100 police officers supervised the construction of a wall around the perimeter of the square made of double-stacked shipping crates. The California Supreme Court sided with UC Berkeley in June, and construction began on June 22. As of the start of construction, the university had not been able to identify a developer for the more than 100 units of supportive housing that were meant to be included in the project.

=== Oakland ===
In 2017, laborers and police cleared out the "Promise Land" encampment beneath a highway overpass in Oakland.

A large fire at an encampment of nearly 200 people on Wood Street led to renewed efforts to clear the encampment in July 2022. Initial orders to sweep the encampment were blocked by a federal judge. In April 2023, the city moved to sweep the encampment again after announcing plans to build 170 units of housing. 36 of the 48 people remaining on the site accepted housing at a nearby "cabin" location managed by the city, and seven moved to a city-run RV park.

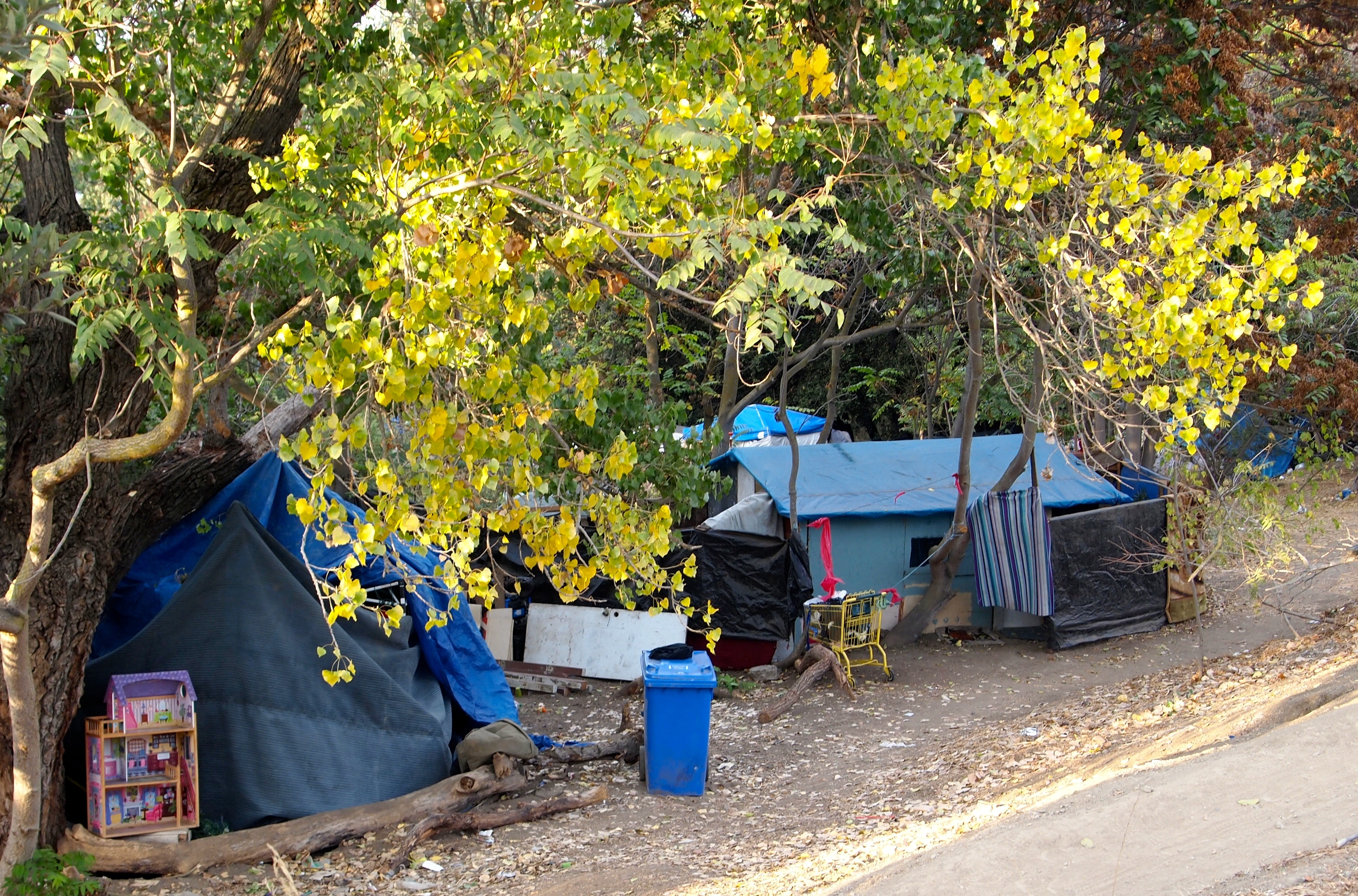
Tents at The Jungle in San Jose

=== San Jose ===
An encampment off Story Road and along the Coyote Creek in San Jose which had first formed in 1999 became home to 300 people by the 2010s. The city first attempted the sweep the encampment in 2012, displacing 150 people. In 2013, the city approved a $4 million budget to provide temporary rental vouchers to some of the encampment's inhabitants.

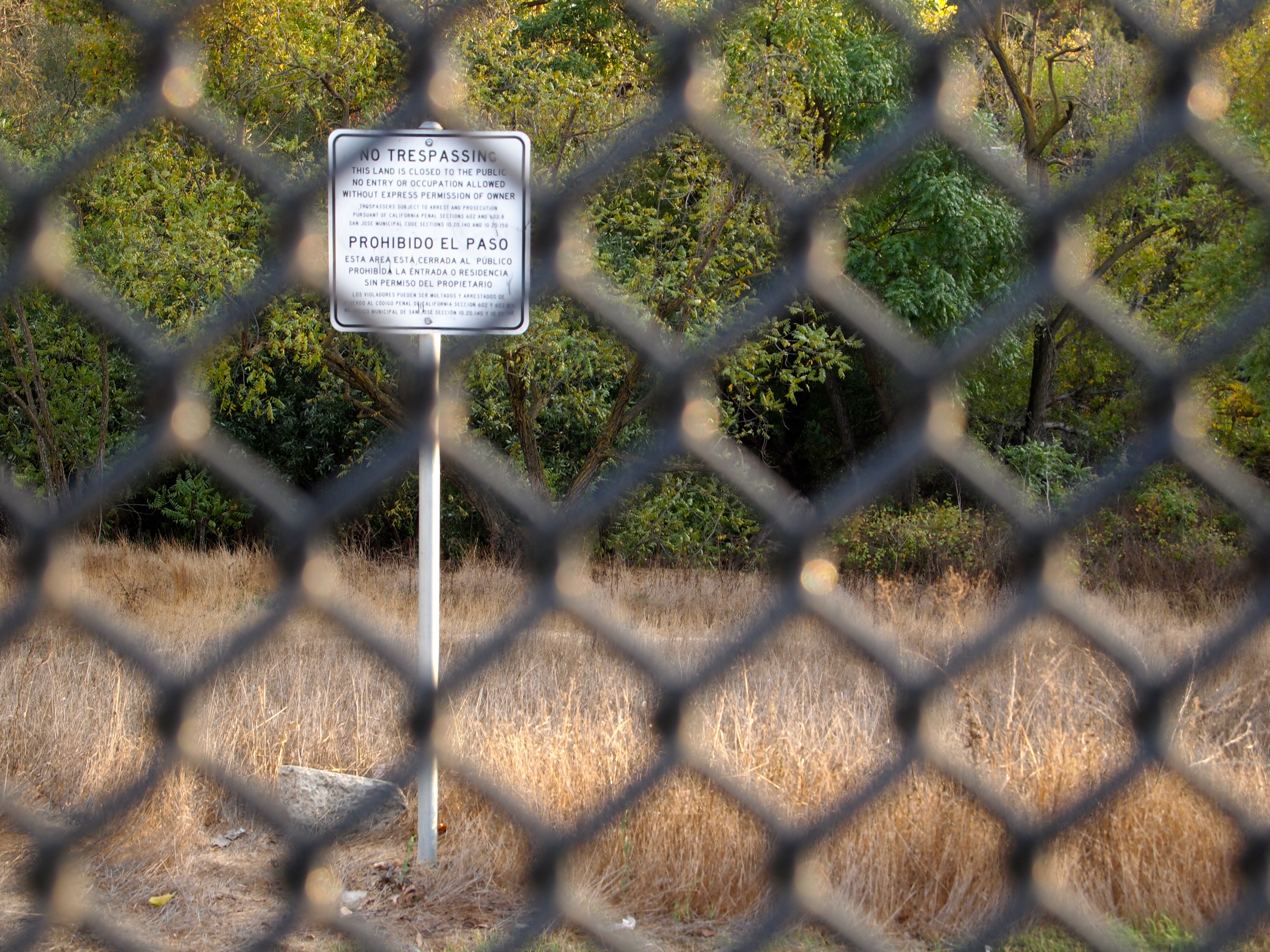
No Trespassing signage at The Jungle

In December 2014, San Jose police evicted 60 people who remained at the encampment. 114 people were placed in housing, and others were given temporary housing arrangements. The encampment cleanup cost the city and the Santa Clara Valley Water District between $400,000 and $500,000. The 75-acre site of the encampment was fenced off and patrolled regularly by police and park rangers to ensure it wouldn't be resettled. Boulders were placed along Story Road to prevent vehicular entry to the area.

=== San Francisco ===
In 2017, San Francisco police responded to nearly 100,000 resident complaints regarding "homeless concerns." In 2020, mayor London Breed personally directed the police chief "to clear specific people in her line of sight."

After the Supreme Court's ruling in Grants Pass v. Johnson, San Francisco ramped up its enforcement of anti-camping laws. Police ceased issuing warnings ahead of encampment sweeps, which had previously been the norm. A sweep on 13th Street began in the morning on 30 July 2024. People seen camping on the street had most of their property confiscated and were given 15 minutes to leave and threatened with citations and arrests. On 1 August, Mayor Breed issued an executive order directing city agencies to offer bus tickets out of the city to the homeless before offering any other city service during encampment sweeps. Complaints to city offices about encampments spiked in several San Francisco neighborhoods in August with the city as a whole seeing a 20% increase in encampment reports and some neighborhoods seeing an increase as high as 300%.

== Colorado ==
In 2020 the city of Denver cleared an encampment of about 300 people on a vacant lot of land next to the Cross Roads Shelter in the River North Arts District. Four people were arrested.

Denver spent nearly $600,000 to clear 230 large encampments in 2021 and 2022.

In July 2023, Denver mayor Mike Johnston took office and declared a state of emergency with the intention of ending unsheltered homelessness in the city. The first sweep by the Johnston administration was of an encampment on 8th and Logan streets near the Governor's Mansion. 70 people there were offered a path to housing with the city, but others missed the offer while at their jobs during the day and were displaced when the camp was cleared. By October 2024, the city had brought 1,950 people off the streets and into more stable shelter. 283 moved on to some form of permanent housing, with many staying with family and others renting, but 58 others were sent to jail and 18 died. 223 people returned to the streets and the city lost track of 81.

== Connecticut ==
In 2015, Norwalk police cleared an encampment of about a dozen people under the Stroffolino Bridge.

In 2020, Waterford police swept a decades-old encampment by the Boston Post Road.

In November 2022, Bridgeport evicted an encampment under I-95. Eight people from the encampment accepted shelter at a nearby YMCA.

Between March and October 2023, Hartford recorded 29 encampment complaints and disbanded 12 sites.

In March 2023, New Haven police and homeless services cleared an encampment along the West River by Ella T. Grasso Boulevard. Originally home to around a dozen people, it dwindled to four before being swept on 16 March. A local homeowner refused to leave the encampment in protest of the city's treatment of its residents, and was arrested. In June 2024, housing activists set up a tent encampment on the New Haven Green to "protest against past clearings of homeless encampments, and in support of the rights of the unhoused."

== Delaware ==
In 2014, Delaware state police swept an encampment south of Lewes. After police dispersed the residents, their belongings were cleared out by penal laborers. Later that year, police cleared an encampment in Christiana that had timber shelters and electricity.

In January 2023, around 50 residents of a Milford encampment on a lot off Route 113 were evicted when the lot was sold to a new owner with plans to develop it.

== Florida ==
In January 2022, Pensacola officials moved forward with plans to disband an encampment under Interstate 110 which had been under an eviction moratorium since February 2021. Officials declined to extend the moratorium in December 2021. In December 2024, Pensacola cleared an encampment of 150-200 people on Beggs Lane that had been established there for several years, enforcing its new law prohibiting sleeping or camping on public property.

On 16 May 2024, Gainesville police and municipal workers cleared a tent encampment around Southeast Fourth Place in downtown Gainesville. The city used excavators to remove people's belongings.

== Georgia ==
In February 2022, an encampment in front of Atlanta City Hall disbanded voluntarily after the city agreed to house the camp's residents in motels for a month. In November 2022, Atlanta police and the Georgia Department of Transportation began clearing a site with heavy machinery near I-85 and Cheshire Bridge off Bufford Highway where around 100 people had camped. Around 25 of the displaced people were given shelter at a local motel. APD began an operation to sweep encampments underneath the city's bridges in February 2024. half a dozen people were told to pack three bags and leave as their encampment was disbanded.

In January 2025, a man was killed during the sweep of an encampment near Ebenezer Baptist Church in Atlanta. People staying in the encampment said that workers used a bulldozer on the tents without checking to see if they were occupied.

== Hawaii ==
Honolulu police regularly sweep encampments. Between April and May 2020, police performed 23 sweeps.

== Idaho ==
Police and incarcerated workers with the Sheriff's Labor Detail in Boise cleared an encampment behind the city's Interfaith Sanctuary.

== Illinois ==
Chicago police cleared a West Loop encampment in December 2023. In 2024, Mayor Brandon Johnson approved $814,000 in emergency funding to clear and fence off an encampment on the green belt off of the Dan Ryan Expressway, in preparation for the 2024 Democratic National Convention.

== Indiana ==
In May 2024, Bloomington and Monroe County police cleared three encampments near Switchyard Park.

== Iowa ==
The city of Des Moines swept more than 70 encampments between January and June 2024.

== Kansas ==
In June 2024, Topeka swept an encampment along the Kansas River.

== Kentucky ==
Louisville police apologized after clearing an encampment, displacing seven people and destroying their belongings without warning on 19 February 2021. 22 people originally lived at the encampment. Campers and advocates were told that the encampment would not be cleared until February 26.

== Louisiana ==
In February 2024, New Orleans cleared more than 70 people from an encampment under the bridge at Orleans and Claiborne streets.

In October 2024, Governor Jeff Landry ordered Louisiana State Police to sweep of an encampment of about 75 people beneath an underpass in downtown New Orleans ahead of three sold out Taylor Swift concerts. People living at the encampment were relocated to a state sanctioned encampment near the Home Depot on Calliope Street which was criticized by city councilmember Lesli Harris for its lack of "basic health and safety facilities."

In January 2025, Landry ordered the removal of encampments in the vicinity of the Caesars Superdome ahead of Super Bowl LIX. People removed from the area were relocated to a fenced in warehouse owned by the Port of New Orleans. The sweeps were undertaken against the wishes of local officials, who said they hampered their efforts to address homelessness.

== Maine ==
In May 2023, the city of Portland cleared an encampment of over 80 tents on Bayside Trail after weeks of debate in the city government. City shelters were full at the time of the sweep, and the majority of the encampment's residents could not be offered housing. In August, another encampment was cleared near Deering Oaks Park. In September 2023, Portland cleared an encampment of more than 100 people along Fore River Parkway. Many of the people at that encampment had moved from the previous two. Local businesses built a fence around the encampment, citing complaints. Only 18 people at the Fore River encampment accepted shelter from the state. Many left for encampments on Commercial Street and at the park-and-ride along Marginal Way. State and city workers cleared the Marginal Way encampment, which had become Maine's largest, using bulldozers in November 2023.

In June 2024 the city of Sanford, Maine swept a homeless encampment between the Mousam river and an abandoned mill building, displacing 40 people.

== Maryland ==
Baltimore city and county police cleared an encampment near the city line in August 2023.

== Massachusetts ==
In January 2024 Worcester police arrested three people for refusing to disperse from an encampment erected in the parking lot of the town's temporary emergency shelter.

Under orders of Mayor Michelle Wu the area known as Mass and Cass was swept by police officers, city workers, garbage crews and bulldozers. In total more than 75 tents were removed on October 30, 2023.

== Michigan ==
In October 2021 Kalamazoo police cleared an encampment on the Kalamazoo River that had housed up to 160 people in the preceding two years. Police removed 11 vehicles, including RVs.

In December 2023, Lansing police used bulldozers to clear an encampment under the Kalamazoo Street Bridge.

== Minnesota ==
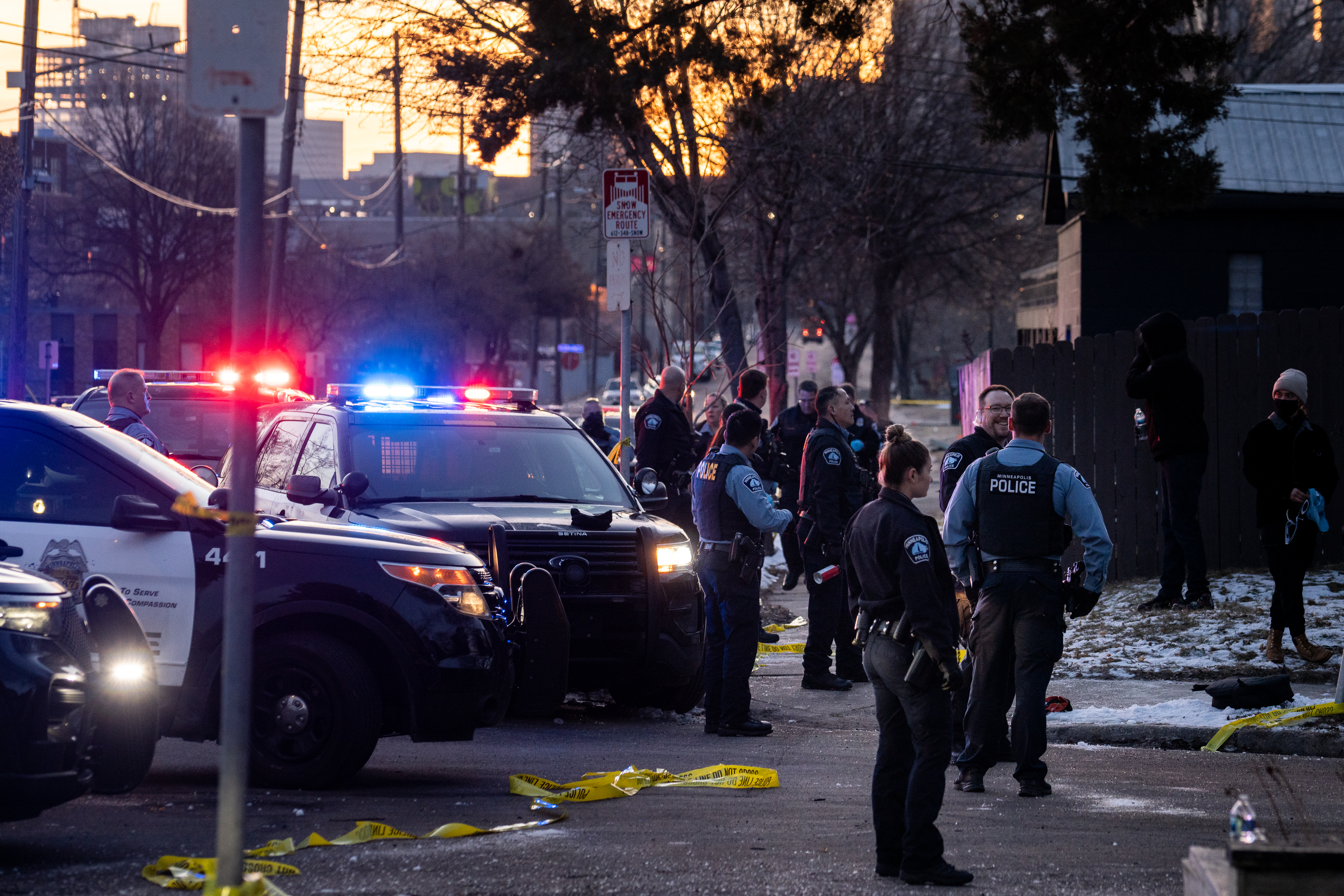
A sweep in Minneapolis

In October 2020, police cleared an encampment of 34 people at Point of Rocks in Duluth.

In 2021, an encampment north of downtown Minneapolis resisted an attempted sweep by police. Video showed police using pepper spray as they arrested five people resisting the eviction. After three houses caught fire in July 2022, the Minneapolis Police Department cleared a nearby encampment. In September 2022 the clearance of an encampment on East 28th Street and Bloomington Avenue sparked protests and complaints. MPD arrested two people for obstructing the clearing an encampment in the Near North neighborhood in October 2022. In December, the city cleared another longstanding encampment near the Quarry shopping center. Minneapolis removed more than 383 people from 44 encampments through November 2023.

== Mississippi ==
Police in Jackson swept an encampment on Jefferson Street in June 2024.

== Missouri ==
In 2022, Missouri passed a law which bans camping on public land and prohibits the state from allocating state or federal funds towards permanent housing. In December 2023, the law was struck down for violating the state constitution's single subject clause.

In St. Louis, an encampment near City Hall was cleared after police shot and killed a man nearby.

== Montana ==
The city of Missoula allowed people to camp at an approved campsite for 10 months in 2022, but later disbanded the encampment. In 2024, Missoula passed a citywide camping ban "during the daytime hours from 8 a.m. to 8 p.m., and to prohibit it during all hours in most parks and conservation land, as well as within certain distances of homes, businesses, schools, shelters and waterways."

== Nebraska ==
Lincoln Mayor Leirion Gaylor Baird defended the City's sweep of an encampment in a wooded area in northwest Lincoln in July 2021. The City worked with the Lincoln Homeless Coalition, which is made up of local nonprofits and other entities, to conduct the sweep.

In May 2023, police cleared an encampment on a vacant lot in South Omaha.

== Nevada ==
Reno police aggressively cleared an encampment near Wells Avenue in June 2020. After media were ordered to leave the scene, Officer Ryan Gott kicked people out of their tents and trashed their belongings without warning.

The city of Las Vegas swept 2,500 encampments through September 2023, up from 1,600 in 2021.

== New Hampshire ==
In January 2024, Rochester cleared an encampment on the grounds of the First Church Congregational.

== New Jersey ==
An encampment of 20 to 25 people in South Camden was cleared in February 2023.

== New Mexico ==
=== Albuquerque/Bernalillo County ===
In September 2021, the city of Albuquerque swept an encampment of 15 to 20 people, throwing away their IDs and personal belongings in violation of the terms of the city's 2017 settlement in McClendon v. Albuquerque. The area around Wells Park was fenced off and restricted to use by a community group. In February 2022, the city swept an encampment of around a dozen people near Eubank and Interstate 40, near Los Altos Park, a day earlier than announced.

In August 2024, the city closed Coronado Park, where more than 125 people had been camping. In September 2022, a law preventing the city from permitting encampments in its zoning code was vetoed by Mayor Tim Keller.

Albuquerque has been criticized for its practice of routinely destroying encamped people's belongings during sweeps, which advocates say has prolonged their homelessness by disconnecting them from public records and services. Albuquerque's Health Housing and Homelessness department reported that the city had cleared or cited over 1,000 encampments in January 2024. In the first half of 2024, the city reported taking action on 5,993 encampments, averaging 999 each month.

=== Española/Valencia County ===
In June 2024, the town of Española, New Mexico, claimed that an encampment of over 30 people would be removed from the lot where they had been allowed for several months. The clearing was delayed until late July, following a visit by Governor Michelle Lujan Grisham.

== New York ==
New York City doubled its encampment sweeps in 2020, despite CDC advice to "allow people who are living unsheltered or in encampments to remain where they are." if shelter beds were not available for them. The city performed 1077 sweeps from March to December 2020, compared to 543 in the same period in 2019.

In 2022, Eric Adams gave control over encampment sweeps back to the NYPD, after they were sidelined following the George Floyd protests. In March 2022, Adams gave orders to dismantle every encampment in the city.

The NYPD made 18 arrests between March and May. On 6 April 2022 police arrested a group of homeless advocates in the East Village who blocked a homeless encampment from being dispersed for several hours. In May, eight protestors were arrested during a sweep of the "Anarchy Row" encampment near Tompkins Square Park. This encampment resisted dispersal more than most others, and gained a reputation for resilience after it was reassembled following repeated sweeps. More than 2,300 people were removed from encampments from March to November in 2022. 199 accepted temporary shelter. Of those, 90 stayed in a shelter for more than one day. As of December 2023, 47 of them remained in shelters and three had found permanent housing.

City officials in Utica cleared an encampment inside the historic Kempf building in June 2024.

== North Carolina ==
In October 2023, Wilmington police swept an encampment of about 30 people on North Kerr Avenue. Police did not attempt to connect the campers with social services.

In April 2024 Raleigh Police cleared an encampment of about 40 people at the intersection of Route 401 and Route 70, drawing protests from concerned residents.

== North Dakota ==
In June 2023, Fargo police swept an encampment along the Red River at least twice at the request of the Fargo Park District.

== Ohio ==
In August 2018, Cincinnati cleared a downtown encampment on Third Street. The city later settled a lawsuit over the sweeps for $83,000 and reformed its policies.

== Oklahoma ==
In March 2024, Tulsa police cleared an encampment of around 35 people behind Lowe's at 71st street.

== Oregon ==
In 2018 Debra Blake, a homeless woman, was banned from every park in Grants Pass, Oregon and fined over $5,000. She sued the city for violating her constitutional rights and her case, which initially led to an injunction against sweeps without an available shelter bed, was overturned by the Supreme Court in City of Grants Pass v. Johnson. Blake died before the injunction went into effect.

Portland cleared 5,000 encampments since November 2022, averaging a rate of 19 per day at the end of 2023. Crews found the bodies of overdose victims inside their tents. In August 2023, Portland police swept a large youth encampment. In January 2024, Portland cleared the largest of its remaining encampments on the edge of Harbor View Memorial Park. 70 tents were taken down, and 17 people accepted a bed in a shelter. More than 50 protestors formed a human chain as the encampment was being cleared.

== Pennsylvania ==
An "elaborate" encampment with couches and other furniture beneath an underpass was cleared by the city of Harrisburg in March 2024.

=== Erie ===
An encampment of around 30 people was dispersed by police in 2024 and in July, more than 200 volunteers dismantled the encampment's makeshift structures and removed trash and personal belongings.

=== Philadelphia ===
Philadelphia has a tradition of squatting, often as a form of protest, going back to the 1980s. Philadelphians were able to win concessions from the city by occupying vacant public housing. In April 1988, takeovers of vacant HUD housing led to a negotiated settlement with the city in which it would transfer hundreds of units of vacant public housing to the unhoused, and authorize a homeless-led organization called Dignity Housing to manage them.

In December 1988, an encampment was set up outside City Hall to protest City Councilmembers who wouldn't allow Dignity Housing to buy federally repossessed homes in their districts.

In April 1992, an encampment dubbed "Caseyville" in protest of Governor Bob Casey's cuts to welfare programs was established in Kensington. Activists and residents of the encampment broke into a nearby abandoned welfare office, hoping to turn it into a community center. They were arrested and charged with several offenses including a felony criminal trespass charge.

In 1993, Ed Rendell's mayoral administration cleared an encampment of around 300 people in the concourse of Suburban Station. In 1995, the city evicted more than 100 people who were camping outside the Family Court Building at Logan Circle. In 1997, another encampment was cleared at the foot of the Benjamin Franklin Bridge.

In September 1995, homeless and antipoverty protestors led by Cheri Honkala established an encampment on Independence Mall next to the Liberty Bell, in protest of plans to sweep an encampment on Fourth Street and Lehigh Avenue in West Kensington. Campers agreed to take down their tents after one night and returned to the West Kensington lot, but moved into the abandoned Church of Saint Edward the Confessor on 17 September.

After being evicted from a lot on Germantown Avenue, the Kensington Welfare Rights Union established an encampment at a vacant city-owned lot on Randolph and Jefferson Streets ahead of the 2000 Republican National Convention. In addition to "homeless and poor families" a number of protestors stayed at the encampment temporarily and participated in antipoverty protests led by the KWRU.

In August 2013, 20 homeless women and children slept outside a homeless intake building on Juniper Street to protest the lack of available shelter beds at the start of the school year. They voluntarily decamped when the city's Shared Prosperity agency bought them pizza and placed each of them in a shelter.

In August 2017, the city began clearing "El Campamento", a large encampment in Kensington. Three more encampments emerged under bridges in Kensington in the wake of the El Campamento sweep, and those were shut down in the summer of 2018. In January 2019, the Jim Kenney administration shut down the last major bridge encampment in Kensington on Emerald Street.

In January 2020, the city cleared an encampment at 18th and Vine Streets. Another encampment was cleared from outside the Pennsylvania Convention Center in March, in violation of CDC guidelines to prevent the spread of COVID-19.

In June, housing activists set up an encampment on Von Collin Memorial Field along the Benjamin Franklin Parkway. The group named their encampment Camp Maroon in an homage to communities of escaped slaves, and later renamed it Camp JTD after a deceased camp resident. The encampment grew to between 150 and 200 residents at its peak. A second encampment was established in June on vacant land outside the Philadelphia Housing Authority's North Philadelphia headquarters. The city was able to negotiate an agreement with residents to disband the camps in exchange for the placement of 50 vacant homes in a community land trust, but it later went back on this promise. Nearly 50 residents were given rental assistance from the city to pay for private housing, and the city partnered with a private developer to build 12 tiny homes in West Philadelphia.

In May 2021 Philadelphia police cleared an encampment at the 12th and Locust PATCO station, where people had been living since December 2020. 42 out of roughly 75 encampment residents accepted housing and treatment services. Another cluster of encampments emerged in Kensington, but without any protest component. Police cleared swept encampments in Kensington that August.

In February and March 2024, police cleared encampments from the Philadelphia International Airport.

On 8 May, Mayor Cherelle Parker ordered police and municipal workers to clear a large encampment between McPherson Square and Allegheny Ave in Kensington. Police removed a number of people from the area before they could be connected with outreach teams offering services. Witnesses reported sanitation workers using water hoses and leaf blowers to drive people off the streets. Several harm-reduction advocates refused an order by police to disperse. Of around 75 people who were counted living on the block, the Parker administration said 59 were placed in a shelter or treatment since April, with 31 institutionalized after the encampment clearance. Sweeps along Kensington Avenue caused encamped people to disperse onto surrounding side streets, which were subsequently swept by police during unannounced street closures in July. On 4 September, 34 people were arrested during another encampment sweep in Kensington. One woman arrested that day was found dead in her jail cell three days later.

On 4 November 2024, an encampment on Reed Street behind the Giant on the South Philadelphia waterfront was cleared of an unknown number of people who had set up RVs there. At least person from that encampment was relocated to a privately owned abandoned pier on the waterfront. More encampments along the Delaware River waterfront were cleared in October 2025, in preparation for the construction of a 620 unit apartment tower. Private contractors guarded by police used heavy machinery to raze the structures and belongings of encampment residents. City workers offered services to the displaced, and at least five accepted some form of assistance. Most residents said they preferred the waterfront to shelters where their liberties are restricted as well as more dangerous areas such as the Kensington neighborhood.

In early December 2025, as temperatures hit 20 degrees Fahrenheit, Philadelphia launched a sweep of encampments in Kensington, paired with the enforcement of new regulations banning mobile service providers from distributing food, medicine and harm-reduction supplies in the neighborhood.

=== Pittsburgh ===
In November 2023 police cleared an encampment of eight to ten people in downtown Pittsburgh.

== Rhode Island ==
Providence dismantled two of its largest encampments in May 2024, displacing around 70 people.

== South Carolina ==
Early in 2024, Charleston police swept a large encampment near Savannah Highway. In April 2024, police and community members in the West Ashley neighborhood called for volunteers to assist with the cleanup of vacated encampments.

== South Dakota ==
In October 2020, Rapid City police disbanded an encampment set up by local residents to feed the homeless.

== Tennessee ==
In September 2020, more than 50 people were displaced when Chattanooga police disbanded a decades-old encampment.

== Texas ==
In June 2021, Austin police cleared several encampments around City Hall, arresting seven people.

In July 2022, activists with the John Brown Gun Club and other local mutual aid organizations, some of whom were armed, delayed the clearance of an encampment in South Dallas under Interstate 45 by assistance the encampment's inhabitants in moving their belongings long enough for city staff to clean the area, while preventing the residents from being displaced by city marshals.

In December 2023, police in Port Arthur cleared an encampment along 46th Street and Twin City Highway.

In 2024, San Antonio nearly doubled its annual number of encampment sweeps. The increase in sweeps did not reduce homelessness or the number of encampments.

In October 2025, Governor Greg Abbott ordered a state-led razing of encampments in and around Austin, Texas. In the first days of the operation, 48 encampments, including a large encampment at SH 45 and Highway 183, were cleared and 24 people were arrested.

== Utah ==
The Salt Lake City Health Department cleared encampments in the Rio Grande area in December 2020, displacing dozens of people.

== Vermont ==
In 2021, police in Hartford swept several cabins built illegally on private land by a former town selectman and a group of homeless advocates.

Police swept an encampment at Sears Lane in Burlington twice in 2021, reducing its population from around 30 to six from October to December. Two encampment residents and one protestor were arrested in December, when the encampment was cleared and the site fenced off.

== Virginia ==
In March 2024, Fairfax County police cleared an encampment of between 20 and 35 people, opening a temporary shelter to house some of them.

== Washington ==
In 2022, Jay Inslee launched a statewide initiative to sweep encampments. 30 encampments along state highways were closed, with more than 1,000 residents of the camps moving into housing by December 2023. As of May 2024, out of 1,709 people living in Washington encampments, 1,138 accepted housing from the state. 845 remain in emergency shelter, while 192 have transitioned to permanent housing.

In August 2023, Centralia cleared an encampment at Blakeside railroad junction after the property was sold to Rainer Rail by the Washington State Department of Transportation.

=== Seattle ===
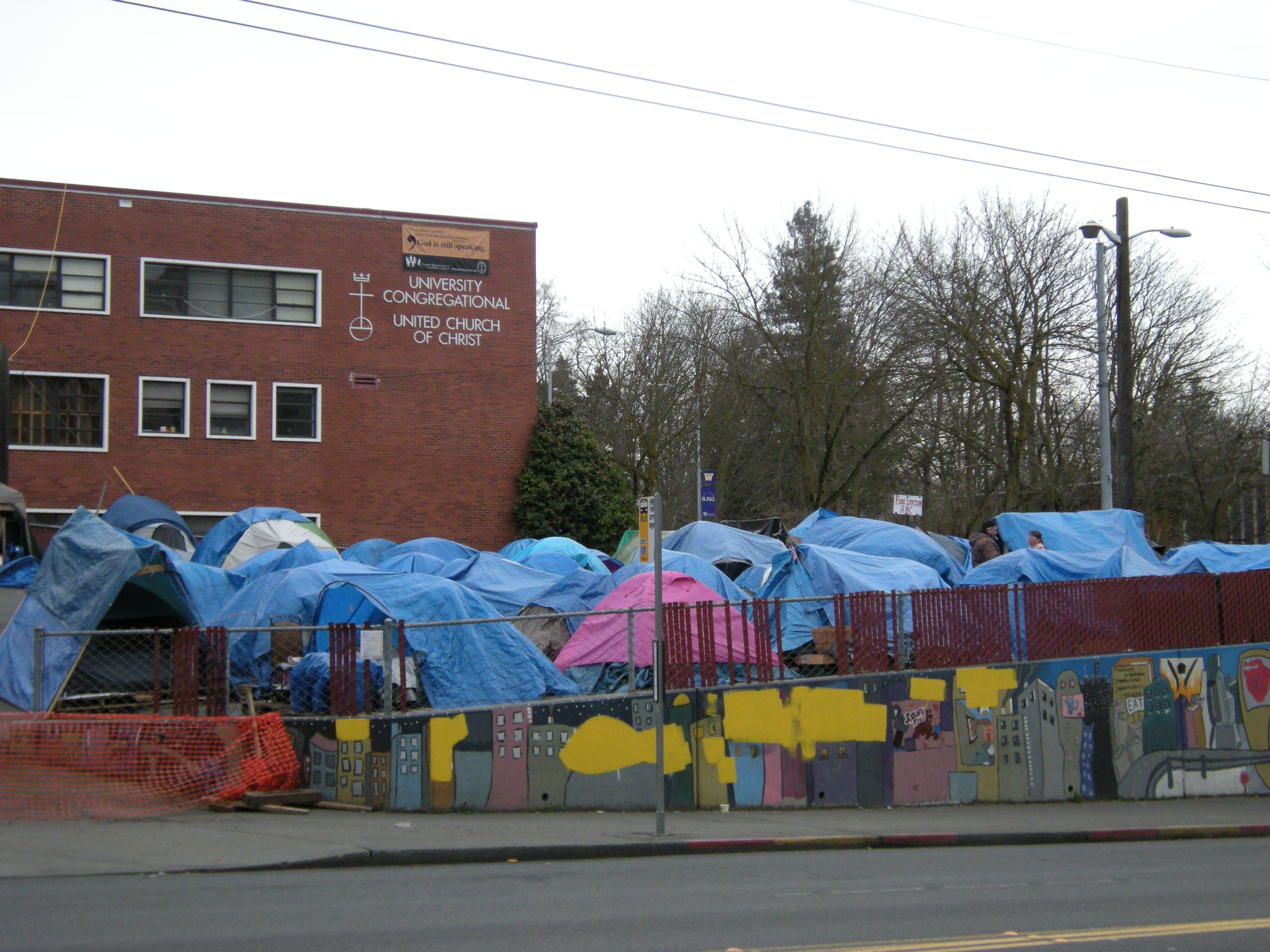
Nickelsville in 2009

The Greg Nickels mayoral administration in Seattle regularly cleared encampments. Beginning in 2008, a series of encampments cleared under Nickels became known collectively as Nickelsville, being disbanded and reformed about 20 times. 22 people were arrested in 2008 during a sweep of Nickelsville at West Marginal Way Southwest and Highland Park Way Southwest. 200 people were displaced, and 14 accepted shelter offered by the city. Under Ed Murray, the Nickelsville encampment became semi-formal and was sanctioned by a 2015 city ordinance along with two other encampments.

A tent encampment adjacent to the Capitol Hill Autonomous Zone which had resisted several attempted sweeps since the CHAZ's disbandment was raided by Seattle police on 18 December 2020. Police made 24 arrests and dispersed around 50 people.

In March 2024, police swept an encampment near Aki Kurose Middle School in south Seattle.

==== The Jungle ====
Officially known as the East Duwamish Greenbelt, The Jungle is an encampment located on a 150-acre tract of land surrounding an elevated portion of Interstate 5 on the Western slope of Beacon Hill. Homeless people may have used the area as early as the 1930s. It gained notoriety in the 1990s when the city began razing the encampments. In 1994, about 50 campsites yielded 120 tons of trash. Periodic sweeps in the 1990s by the city or state department of transportation led to complaints of the city providing little to no warning before enacting cleanups.

Along with numerous and ongoing lower profile deaths and murders, the bodies of three women murdered by a serial killer were found in the area between September 1997 and February 1998. Other deaths included people struck by vehicles while attempting to cross the nearby freeways, and a homeless man sleeping in a blackberry thicket as it was mowed by workers.

The Jungle increasingly became a haven for criminals in the 2000s. Criminal activity included assaults, rapes, prostitution, and murders. Residents in the Beacon Hill neighborhood complained of being burglarized by those staying in The Jungle. Gang members engaging in drug trade in the woods also became a concern. In the early 2000s, a gravel road was built for emergency services while brush was cleared for greater visibility. An extension of the Mountain to Sound bike corridor through the Jungle opened in the fall of 2011 in an attempt to revitalize the area. The trail features a paved path, lighting, and fences. The city attempted to clear the encampment twice a year during the mayoral term of Greg Nickels (2002–2009), but such sweeps were less frequent during Michael McGinn's term (2010–2013) as homelessness increased.

From 2011 to 2016, the area was the site of at least 750 incidents responded to by the Seattle Fire Department, of which 500 were emergency medical situations. By 2016, The Jungle was considered by many to be unsafe at any hour, though others argued the dangers was exaggerated by both officials and the media. In April 2015, police arrested 20 suspects during a series of raids, including Son Van Tran, who Federal prosecutors described as a "boss" in the local drug market.

On January 26, 2016, two people were killed and three were injured during a shooting at the Jungle encampment. The shooting led to calls from Mayor Murray and other local officials to close the encampment per state trespassing laws. Homelessness advocates said the city should stop closing unauthorized encampments until it has an alternative location or shelter for campers.

In February, 2016, the Washington State Legislature proposed $1 million to install a 8,000-foot-long (2,400 m), 6-foot-high (1.8 m) razor wire and barbed-wire fence to encircle the 100-acre (40 ha) area. On May 17, 2016, the city of Seattle and the Washington State Department of Transportation (WSDOT) announced plans to permanently clear out The Jungle, with the estimated 300 remaining people living there to be resettled by the Union Gospel Mission. WSDOT also cleared debris from the freeway's underside and improved road access, while the city cleared the hill above the site, at a total cost of $1 million.

A new encampment formed in 2017 under the Interstate 5 and Interstate 90 interchange to the northwest of the Jungle, dubbed "The New Jungle" or "The Triangle". About 85 of the people living at The Jungle moved to this encampment. While sweeps continued, ongoing reports of gunfire and drug abuse triggered a larger police intervention in January 2020. Authorities made seven arrests and identified a large tent in the middle of the encampment where crack, meth, and heroin were sold.

=== Spokane ===
In Spokane, a formerly homeless local activist, Alfredo LLamedo, began a hunger strike in protest of the city's controversial sit-lie ordinance in November 2018. Several homeless protestors joined LLamedo in forming an encampment outside of Spokane City Hall. After eight days on hunger strike, the city agreed to suspend enforcement of its sit-lie ordinance until it made shelter beds available. Protestors declared their intention to remain encamped outside of city hall after LLamedo's strike ended and the city threatened to sweep the encampment. Demonstrators, including Councilwoman Kate Burke, chained themselves together to block removal of the encampment by police. The encampment, named "Camp Hope" by protestors, remained in front of City Hall until 9 December, when it was cleared by police and Llamedo and another local activist were arrested while helping others move their belongings.

A second protest encampment, named after the original Camp Hope was assembled outside Spokane City Hall in December 2021. Police threatened to clear the encampment and it was disbanded, then re-established at an empty, WSDOT-owned lot near I-90 and Thor Street. The encampment's population increased to 300 people by April 2022, and reached its peak of 600 people that July. In September, the city opened the Trent Shelter and began escalating its law enforcement response to homelessness downtown while threatening to clear Camp Hope by October. In October, the city sued to obtain permission to clear the encampment but residents and service providers sued successfully to block a sweep before the end of the year. In December 2022, the Catalyst Project was opened, providing temporary shelter for another 100 Camp Hope residents. The city sued the county again in March 2023 to force the state to negotiate a closure plan. An agreement was reached in May to close the camp by June 30. The last residents of Camp Hope were removed by June 9.

== Washington, DC ==
In November 2017, Metropolitan Police arrested one man during a sweep of an encampment on the E Street expressway, using dump trucks to dispose of residents' belongings.

In December 2021, Washington DC cleared a longstanding encampment at Allen Park after fencing it off. 12 of the encampment's residents were offered apartment leases through a housing pilot program and all but one of the residents was given a hotel voucher. However, encampment residents who moved to the park after the city had counted its inhabitants were not able to access the services promised to others.

In February 2023 the National Park Service cleared an encampment of about 70 people three blocks from the White House.

On 16 May 2024 The National Park Service and DC police cleared out six encampments in the Foggy Bottom neighborhood, displacing 70 people.

In March 2025, following threats from Donald Trump to take federal action, DC police cleared an encampment near the State Department's Harry S. Truman Building with heavy machinery. The District then posted a list of at least six more encampment sweeps planned during that month.

During the Trump Administration's federal takeover of Washington, DC, the White House announced that more than 40 encampments had been cleared by the National Guard and federal agents.

== West Virginia ==
The city of Wheeling cleared five encampments housing 10 to 30 people in October 2024 after passing a ban on camping within city limits.

== Wisconsin ==
In March 2024, La Crosse police disbanded an encampment of more than 80 people near ongoing construction in the River Point District development.

== Wyoming ==
Cheyenne police arrested five people at an encampment in Crow Creek after passing a camping ban ordinance in August 2023.

== See also ==
- Homeless encampment sweeps
- Squatting in the United States
