= Sussex Correctional Institution =

Prison in Delaware, United States

Coordinates: 38°39′35″N 75°22′13″W

- Interactive map of Sussex Correctional Institution
- Location: 23203 Dupont Blvd Georgetown, Delaware address
- Status: open
- Security class: maximum, medium, and minimum
- Capacity: 1206
- Opened: 1931
- Managed by: Delaware Department of Correction

The Sussex Correctional Institution (SCI) is located in unincorporated Sussex County, Delaware, near Georgetown. Opened in 1931, SCI, a part of the Delaware Department of Correction, is one of Delaware's oldest correctional facilities. SCI houses medium, and minimum security inmates. Maximum security inmates are housed at James T. Vaughn Correctional Center (JTVCC) in Smyrna, Delaware. SCI houses an all-male population.

A major expansion project was completed at SCI: between April 1997 and April 2000, 760 beds were added to the facility for a total capacity of 1,109 beds. The expansion brought the total capacity of the institution to 1206. SCI is also home to the nationally recognized substance abuse treatment program called KEY. In an effort to reduce crime and recidivism, Governor Thomas R. Carper and the Department of Correction unveiled the program at SCI on February 10, 1998. SCI's program is called KEY South. The KEY program is an intense, discipline-based therapeutic substance abuse treatment program for 180 offenders at SCI. This program has now been replaced by the "Road to Recovery" (R2R) program, which is a community-based program.

Several programs designed to facilitate rehabilitative efforts are in place at SCI. These programs include educational opportunity, vocational training, work assignments, spiritual/religious opportunity and a variety of other classes and programming.
