= Homeless encampment sweep =

Removal of homeless from public spaces

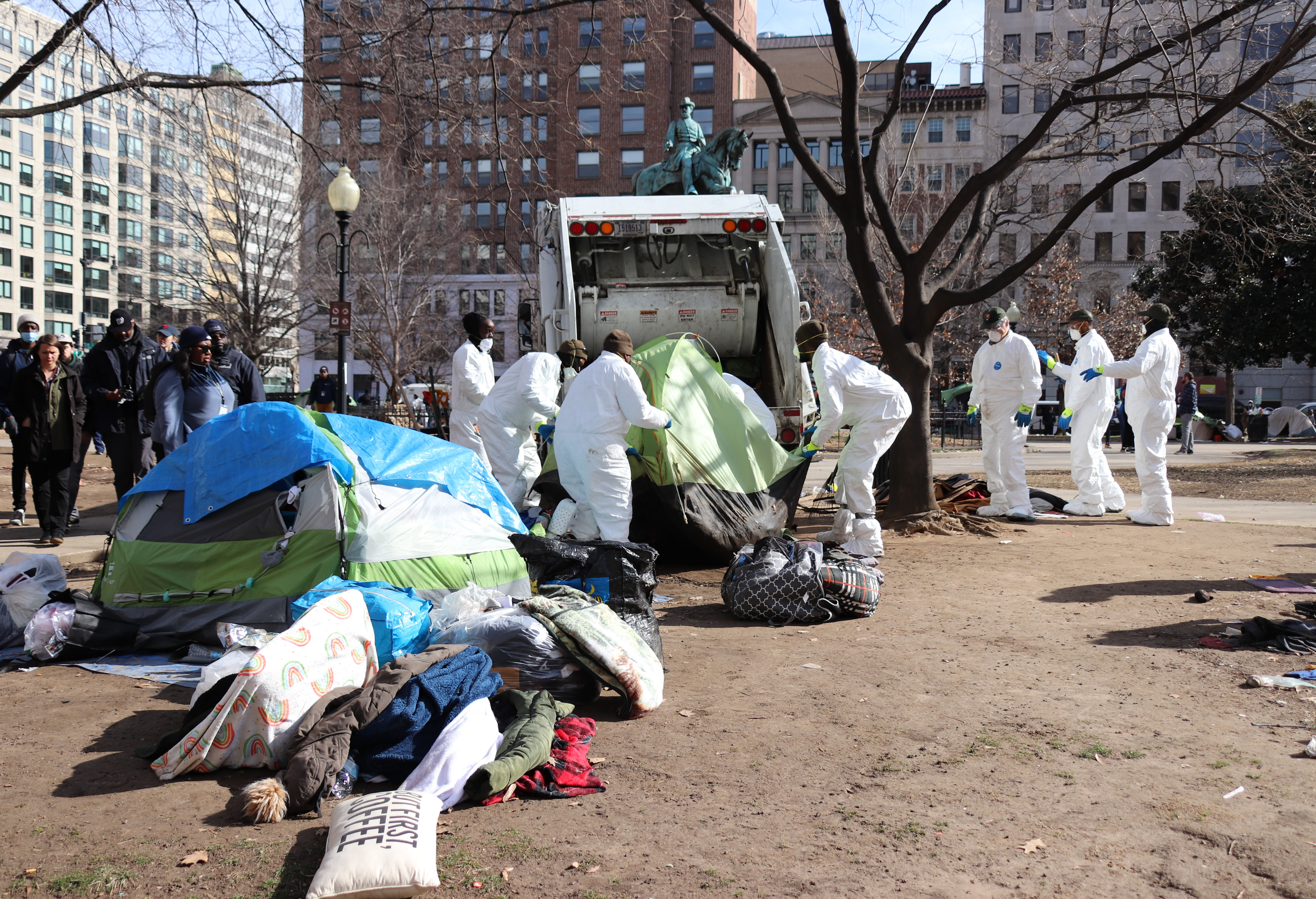
Homeless encampment sweep in Washington, D.C.

A homeless encampment sweep is the forced removal of homeless people and their property from a public area. It may include routine sanitation cleanups, which displace homeless residents for a few hours, to the permanent dislocation of individuals or communities. Often called "encampment resolutions" or "clean-ups" by local governments, they are alternatively labeled "sweeps" by advocacy groups.

In recent years, the number of encampments swept across the United States has soared in response to public and political pressures. The strategy is highly controversial among groups who work with homeless communities, who argue that sweeps are inhumane, ineffective, and sever crucial connections to care. They have also been performed in other countries such as Canada

== History in the United States ==
In the past three decades, American cities have increasingly turned to "quality of life" laws to maintain public order among different urban populations. These laws generally criminalize the use of public spaces to sit, sleep, beg, or store personal items. Noteworthy laws that prohibit behaviors related to homelessness include Los Angeles' 41.18, Houston's Charitable Feeding Ordinance, and the City of Grants Pass' prohibition "from using a blanket, pillow, or cardboard box for protection from the elements."

These quality of life ordinances often constitute the criminalization of homelessness as defined by the National Coalition for the Homeless, which "prohibit life-sustaining activities such as sleeping/camping, eating, sitting, and/or asking for money/resources in public spaces."

In San Francisco, whose robust homeless population is commonly attributed to the California housing shortage, quality of life offenses are first subject to fines, then, if repeated or left unaddressed, misdemeanor charges. Researchers like UCLA sociologist Chris Herring argue that the financial charges associated with encampment sweeping compound economic burdens for homeless people, while merely "shuffling" them across space.

=== During the COVID-19 pandemic ===
The use of encampment sweeps by municipal governments has spiked precipitously since the COVID-19 pandemic, correlating with surges in homelessness across U.S. cities. Researchers have linked the increase in homelessness with the persistent national housing shortage, rent hikes, and the conclusion of pandemic government relief programs.

Several U.S. cities continued encampment sweeps during the COVID-19 pandemic despite CDC guidelines, which advised cities to let homeless residents shelter-in-place until individual housing units were available. Causing homeless residents to disperse would only disrupt relationships with healthcare providers and increase the likelihood of outbreak, said the agency in 2020. While some were only temporarily displaced for cleaning, like residents in Denver, others returned to find their tent sites bulldozed or replaced with permanent landscaping.

=== Grants Pass v. Johnson ===
In 2024, the United States Supreme Court ruled in Grants Pass v. Johnson that local government ordinances penalizing camping on public land do not constitute cruel and unusual punishment of homeless people.

Aggressive moves to sweep major cities in California followed the Grants Pass ruling. On July 25, 2024, Governor Gavin Newsom released an executive order directing "state agencies to move urgently to address dangerous encampments." In response, mayors in San Jose, San Francisco, and San Diego lauded Newsom for his call to action. As San Francisco's Mayor London Breed told reporters, beginning in August 2024, the city was "going to make them so uncomfortable on the streets of San Francisco that they have to take our offer." She intensified, "We will be using law enforcement to cite, and those citations can get progressive and can lead to a misdemeanor."

The mayoral responses in many cities follow a public interest in addressing homelessness. Business owners and Republicans also supported Newsom's order.

== Impact ==
Homeless encampment sweeps have contested effectiveness at mitigating the impacts of homelessness in communities. While they remove encampments from their immediate surroundings, often in response to crime complaints, research has shown that complaints remain at the same level 30 days after a sweep.

In a Los Angeles Times survey, respondents said that more than half of sweeps involved police contact, and only 15% involved a non-police homelessness outreach worker. Most respondents were moved more than once over the six-month course of the survey. As the critical finding of the study, the same percentage of people who received housing (9% of respondents) were ticketed by the police after a sweep. Citations and tickets which complement sweeps can be a severe economic burden for residents who are otherwise struggling financially, which can contribute to future struggles with homelessness.

=== Confiscation of belongings ===
Encampment sweeps often involve the confiscation or destruction of personal belongings. Many cities have created facilities to store possessions taken during encampment sweeps. However, unhoused residents have often reported that encampment clearing crews have broad discretion over which objects are stored versus being thrown away.

Commonly taken possessions include tents, sleeping bags, food items, and medical supplies. Government identification documents are commonly taken as well, though many cities require that workers store it. Nonetheless, service workers often discuss difficulties coordinating food and health benefits with homeless clients whose identification was confiscated in a sweep.

=== Physical, social, and mental well-being ===
==== Disruptions to medical care ====
Sweeps can lead to the confiscation of medications and medical devices critical for physical safety. In one instance in Sacramento, Greg Adams experienced a seizure and subsequent head injury after losing his seizure medication to a sweep crew. In Little Rock, a man called Steven, whose experience with frostbite led to the amputation of his feet, had all his belongings confiscated in a sweep. He got frostbite again shortly after.

Confiscated medical devices logged in storage facility records include: an oxygen tank, one dose of Narcan, 4 packages of diapers, a motor wheelchair, five COVID tests, and a blood sugar monitor.

Sweeps are also argued to disrupt connections to care, contributing to increased drug overdoses and deaths.

==== Heightened mortality ====
In one study performed at the University of Colorado Anschutz Medical Campus and in coordination with the National Health Care for the Homeless Council, the CDC, and the CDC Foundation, a simulation model was developed predicting health effects of consistent sweeps on a drug-injecting population over ten years. The model drew from data in 23 U.S. cities.

Modeling the outcomes of consistent sweeping versus no sweeping, the study found that encampment sweeps could contribute to a 15-25% increase in deaths over ten years. In hundreds of simulations, the study found no scenario in which consistent sweeps had a neutral or positive impact on the health outcomes of the studied population.

==== Compromised trust ====
Service providers such as Kevin Lindamood, CEO of Baltimore's Health Care for the Homeless, believe that sweeps harmfully undermine trust in service providers. If present, they can be accused of being complicit, whereas if absent, they can be seen as failing to adequately support their clients.

Encampment residents who have experienced sweeps may have decreased trust in the police, resulting in the avoidance of calling 911 in emergencies. The mistrust of law enforcement can contribute to both a physical vulnerability to violence, as well as a psychological feeling of insecurity.

==== Racial Discrimination ====
Street sweeps tend to disproportionately impact racialized individuals and communities, as Black, Hispanic, and Indigenous groups are overrepresented in the homeless population in the US and Canada. The racial disparities highlight ongoing structures of systemic racism that contribute to higher rates of poverty, homelessness, and police violence.

In Vancouver's Downtown Eastside, where frequent street sweeps and decampments have taken place, Indigenous people are particularly impacted due to the ongoing effects of colonialism, forced displacement, and intergenerational trauma. Similarly, in many US cities, Black, Hispanic, and Indigenous communities experience heightened policing and surveillance, making encampment removals feel targeted and punitive rather than supportive.

== Justifications ==
Homeless encampments are often cited as hazardous to public health and safety. They can also harm nearby business interests.

Many cities allow for encampment sweeps only in conjunction with a patchwork of services. Leading with offers of shelter is a consistent policy among outreach workers in many major U.S. cities, including San Francisco. However, in San Francisco in 2023, 64% of encampment residents declined offers of shelter, while the year saw only a 22% increase in people connected to shelter. The high rate of shelter refusal could have a number of causes. In a survey conducted by the Los Angeles Times, a high percentage of homeless people said that they would accept housing offers, but fewer than 20% would accept a shelter offer in the same large room as others. They cited privacy, safety, cleanliness, and conflicts with staff as key justifications for rejecting this kind of shelter offer.

Supporters of sweeping argue that residents are often given adequate notice to safely move along with their possessions in tow. In California, for instance, state agencies are required to warn residents at least 48 hours in advance, and store their belongings for at least 60 days. They are also instructed to coordinate with local service providers. These requirements can be overridden only in instances where the encampment poses an "imminent threat" to life, health, safety, or infrastructure.

== See also ==
- List of homeless encampment sweeps in the United States
