= Pennyhill, Delaware =

Unincorporated community in Delaware, United States

Pennyhill, Delaware Penny Hill
- Unincorporated community
- Location within Delaware Location within the United States
- Coordinates: 39°46′07″N 75°30′52″W
- Country: United States
- State: Delaware
- County: New Castle
- Elevation: 131 ft (40 m)
- Time zone: UTC-5 (Eastern (EST))
  - Summer (DST): UTC-4 (EDT)
- Area code: 302
- GNIS feature ID: 214436

Pennyhill (also known as Penny Hill) is an unincorporated community in New Castle County, Delaware, United States. Pennyhill is located north of U.S. Route 13 Business and west of Delaware Route 3, northeast of Wilmington. Delaware State Police Troop 1 is located in Pennyhill.

Pennyhill is more commonly known as Ridgewood, consisting of Ridgewood Circle and the adjacent Lynn streets.
