= Delaware Capitol Police =

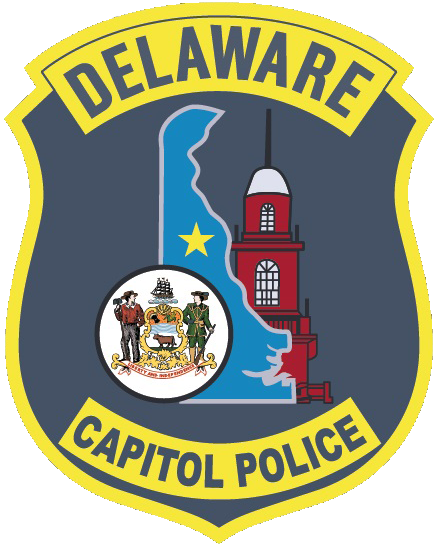

Agency overview
- Formed: 1965
- Annual budget: $11,670,000 (FY 2024)

Jurisdictional structure
- Operations jurisdiction: Delaware, U.S.
- Legal jurisdiction: As per operations jurisdiction
- General nature: Civilian police

Operational structure
- Overseen by: Delaware Department of Safety and Homeland Security
- Sworn members: 80
- Agency executive: Elmer C. Harris, Chief of Police

Website
- Official Site

The Delaware Capitol Police is the law enforcement agency responsible for the Delaware Legislative Hall, the Governor's Mansion, Capitol Complex, and over 80 State Controlled Courts and Buildings in the State of Delaware. The Delaware Capitol Police operates under the Delaware Department of Safety and Homeland Security. The Delaware Capitol Police is led by a Chief of Police, and employed 80 Officers as of 2022.

The Delaware Capitol Police are responsible for ensuring the security of all three branches of state government in Delaware. Capitol Police Officers have authority statewide, and are certified by Delaware's Council on Police Training. As of 2024, the Delaware Capitol Police Budget was $11,670,000.

== History ==
The Delaware Capitol Police was founded as a three-man unit in 1965 to deter vandalism at the Legislative Hall, in Dover, Delaware. The unit was originally known as Capitol Security.

Responsibilities were eventually expanded to cover other state-owned properties in Delaware while the unit remained unfunded (being maintained through donations and transfer of equipment from other law enforcement agencies). Officers initially received no formal training and were armed only with a nightstick, handcuffs and tear gas.

In 1974, Delaware Director of Administrative Services Thomas Murray overhauled the organization, providing basic law-enforcement training. Having been sworn in as constables, the officers now had the power of arrest on state property. New equipment and uniforms were issued at this time and the organization became known as the Capitol Security Police.

In 1980 the organization adopted its current name. Arrest powers were expanded statewide in 1982. Further changes in 1995 saw a redesign of the patch worn by officers and integration of communications systems with the Delaware State Police in order to improve response times to emergencies.

In 2020 the Delaware Capitol Police patch was updated with a new design which is now worn by all Police personnel.

== Rank structure ==
Title	Insignia
Chief	
Major	
Lieutenant	
Sergeant	
Master Corporal	
Senior Corporal	
Corporal	
Patrolman 1st Class	
Patrolman (No Insignia)	

== Operations ==
The Delaware Capitol Police maintains police officers and security officers in all three of Delaware's counties servicing all three branches of state government. DCP headquarters is located within the Tatnall Building in Dover. The Delaware Capitol Police also maintains three explosive detection canine teams and 5 detectives.

The Northern Operation services:

- Leonard L. Williams Justice Center
- Carvel State Building
- Renaissance Office Complex
- Delaware Medical Examiner Office
- 900 King street Building

The Central Operation services:

- Delaware Legislative Hall
- Tatnall Building
- Delaware Governor's Mansion (Woodburn)
- Dover Patrol Section (servicing over 80 separate state facilities) Formerly called the Kent County Patrol.
- Kent County Courthouse
- Kent County Family Court

The Southern Operation services:

- Sussex County Courthouse
- Sussex County Family Court
- Sussex County Court of Chancery

The Special Operation Services:

- Canine Unit
- CRASE Unit
- CVSA Unit
- Firearms Unit
- Honor Guard Unit
- Quartermaster
- Recruitment Unit
- Special Investigations Unit

== Delaware Capitol Security ==
Delaware Capitol Police employs Security Officers who operate the magnetometers and x-ray machines at the entrances to the courthouses, Legislative Hall, and the Carvel State Building. They are responsible for the screening, and if necessary the searching, of employees, visitors, and packages entering the courthouse. Capitol Security Officers are trained in the use of magnetometers, x-ray machines, handcuffing, defensive aerosol sprays, and certified in performing CPR, using AED's (automatic external defibrillator), and providing First Aid. Senior Security Officers are Capitol Security Officers who attend one of the seasonal police officer training courses provided by a Delaware police agency under the guidelines established by the Delaware Council on Police Training. Once completed they become Senior Security Officers and after being sworn in are granted the legal authority to detain individuals while in the performance of their official duties. Senior Security Officers are recognized by the dark blue sleeve worn on the epaulets of their uniform shirts.

== See also ==
- List of law enforcement agencies in Delaware
- Capitol police
