= Delaware State Police =

Police force of Delaware, U.S.

- Patch of Delaware State Police

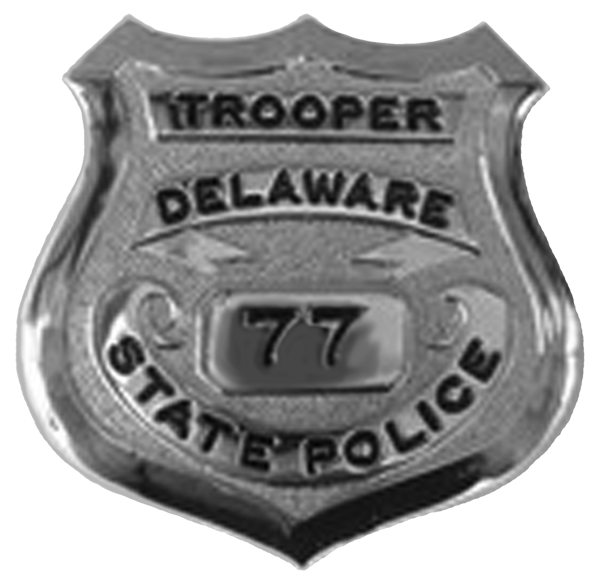
- Badge of Delaware State Police
- Abbreviation: DSP

Agency overview
- Formed: April 23, 1923; 103 years ago
- Preceding agency: Highway Traffic Police
- Employees: 847 (as of 2008)

Jurisdictional structure
- Operations jurisdiction: Delaware, USA
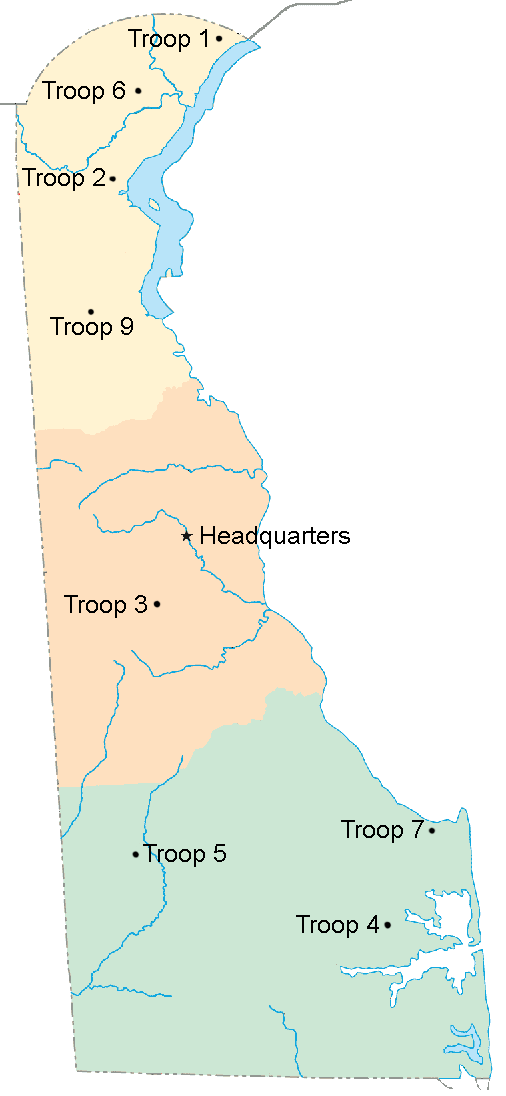
- Map of Delaware State Police's jurisdiction
- Area: 1,982 square miles (5,130 km^{2})
- Population: 907,135 (2011 est.)
- General nature: Civilian police

Operational structure
- Headquarters: Dover, Delaware
- Troopers: 706 (as of 2014)
- Civilians: 242 (as of 2014)
- Agency executive: Colonel William Crotty, Superintendent

Facilities
- Troops: 8

Website
- http://dsp.delaware.gov/

The Delaware State Police (DSP) is a division of the Delaware Department of Public Safety and Homeland Security and is responsible for traffic regulation and law enforcement across the US State of Delaware, especially in areas underserved by local police departments. The DSP is headquartered in the capital Dover, Delaware.

The Delaware State Police currently employs 723 full-time officers, which is 75 troopers for every 100,000 residents in 2019, the largest number of any state police force.

== Troops ==
Currently, the DSP operates out of eight barracks known as "Troops", not including Headquarters. Each county has one troop that is shared between patrol (Uniformed) and detective (CIU) units. Delaware State Police investigate over 33,000 criminal complaints yearly.

- Troop 1 – Penny Hill (near Claymont), New Castle County (Patrol Only)
  - A sub-station of Troop 1, called Troop 1A, was located on the grounds of the Brandywine Town Center in the Brandywine Hundred section of New Castle County. It is now closed.
- Troop 2 – Bear, New Castle County (Shared by Patrol, C.I.U., G.T.F. and New Castle County C.R.U.)
- Troop 3 – Rising Sun, Kent County (Shared by Patrol, C.I.U., G.T.F. and Kent County C.R.U.)
- Troop 4 – Georgetown, Sussex County (Shared by Patrol, C.I.U. and G.T.F.)
- Troop 5 – Bridgeville, Sussex County (Patrol Only)
- Troop 6 – Prices Corner (near Elsmere), New Castle County (Patrol Only)
- Troop 7 – Lewes, Sussex County (Patrol & Sussex County CRU)
- Troop 9 – Odessa, New Castle County (Patrol Only)

C.I.U. - Criminal Investigative Unit

G.T.F. - Governor's Task Force

C.R.U. - Crash Reconstruction Unit

== Counties ==
In Kent and Sussex Counties, the Delaware State Police serve as the primary law-enforcement agency that are not incorporated into municipalities who have their own law enforcement agency.

In New Castle County, the Delaware State Police shares primary jurisdiction with the New Castle County Police. The 1974 jurisdictional agreement between DSP and NCCPD states the New Castle County Police investigates complaints in residences or commercial areas located on county roads or community streets. The Delaware State Police investigates complaints in residences or commercial areas located on state roads or interstate highways. However, in an emergency incident, the closest New Castle County Police officer or Delaware State Police trooper will respond no matter where the complaint originates from.

== Units/sections ==
Like other state police agencies, the Delaware State Police has several sub-divisions specializing in addressing particular crimes or security needs.

=== Full-time units ===
- Aviation Unit (North & South Hangars)
- Canine Unit
- Collision Reconstruction Unit
- Commercial Motor Vehicle Enforcement Unit
- Community Outreach Unit
- Criminal Investigations Units (Robbery, Burglary, Financial Crimes, Major Crimes, Domestic Violence & Youth Aid Detectives)
- Drug Unit
- Evidence Detection Unit
- Executive Protection Unit
- Firearms Training Unit
- Gaming Enforcement Unit
- Governor's Task Force
- High Technology Crimes Unit
- Homeland Security
- Homicide Unit
- Inspections/Accreditation Unit
- Intelligence Unit
- Internal Affairs
- Maritime Unit
- Polygraph Unit
- Public Information Office
- Planning Section
- Recruiting Unit
- School Resource Officer
- Sex Offender Apprehension & Registration Unit
- Special Operations Response Team (10 Full-Time Members)
- State Bureau of Identification
- Training Academy
- Traffic Section

=== Part-time units ===
- Conflict Management Team
- Explosive Ordnance Disposal
- Honor Guard Unit
- Motor Unit
- Mounted Patrol Unit
- Pipes & Drums Unit
- Scuba Team (Water Operations & Recovery)
- Special Operations Response Team (Part-Time Members from across the state outside of the 10 Full-Time Members)
- Tactical Control Unit

=== Special units ===
The DSP also operates several special units/locations around the state, including aviation units in Georgetown and Middletown, and weigh stations on U.S. Rt. 13 and U.S. Rt. 301.

=== 9-1-1 dispatch centers ===
Additionally, the Delaware State Police also provides 9-1-1 dispatch center services in all 3 counties for both DSP and any municipal agencies which do not have their own dispatcher. RECOM is for New Castle County, KENTCOM is for Kent County, and SUSCOM is for Sussex County. The New Castle County Police and several of the larger city police provide their own dispatch services.

=== Division of Gaming Enforcement ===
The Division of Gaming Enforcement is responsible for enforcing state laws relating to gaming that occur in a licensed video lottery facility, or which relate the operation of the Delaware Lottery.

The Casino Background Investigators are responsible for background checks on staff involved in gambling, and the Criminal Investigations and Intelligence team, which includes 8 state troopers and an agent from the Delaware Division of Alcohol and Tobacco Enforcement, investigates gaming crime and develops intelligence on criminal activity in relation to gaming and gambling. In 2019, 361 complaints were investigated by the Division.

== Uniforms and equipment ==
Since the 1950s, members of the DSP have worn uniforms more similar to the state's colors of "blue and gold". In the past, DSP used military-type colors of navy and green.

The most distinctive uniform is the "Class A Dress" uniform consisting of a navy blue military dress coat with French blue shoulder epaulets and sleeve cuffs. The long sleeve uniform shirt is French blue in color with a navy blue tie. The DSP patch bearing the great seal of Delaware is worn on the left arm of all uniform items. The trooper's rank is worn on both sleeves. The trooper's years of service "hash-marks" are worn on the lower part of the left arm. The trooper's badge is worn over the left pocket and the nameplate, along with any awards, over the right pocket. A matching French blue color trouser with a 2-inch gold stripe on the legs is worn with black leather knee-high riding boots. This was the standard everyday uniform in the past. However, it is now worn for special events only.

The standard winter uniform, worn between November and April, is the same as the "Class A Dress" uniform, except that the military dress coat is replaced with a standard patrol jacket. The knee-high boots are replaced with shoes, however some troopers still wear the boots.

The standard summer uniform, worn between April and November, is the same as the winter uniform, except the long sleeve shirt is replaced with a short sleeve shirt and it is worn without the tie. During the summer months the color of the uniform trouser changes from French blue to navy blue with the same 2-inch gold stripe.

DSP troopers wear a navy blue campaign hat with the state seal. Prior to the 1950s, they wore a tan cavalry-style hat like those worn by Maryland troopers.

Troopers holding the rank of lieutenant and above wear gold badges, nameplates, and collar rank. They are also permitted to wear a white color shirt in place of the French blue shirt, but this has fallen out of practice in recent years.

The DSP duty belt is Gould & Goodrich plain black leather with a Safariland "raptor level-3" holster. The ammo pouch, OC spray holder, and handcuff case have silver snaps (gold for lieutenant and above). The portable radio and ASP baton is also worn on the duty belt. A shoulder strap is used with the "Class A Dress" uniform, otherwise standard belt keepers are used. It is DSP policy that all duty belts are to be worn the same way, so troopers can not remove or add any equipment to the duty belt.

=== Best dressed ===
In 2005, the Delaware State Police were named the "best-dressed state law enforcement agency" according to the National Association of Uniform Manufacturers.

=== Rank structure ===
Title	Insignia	Details
Colonel		Colonel of the Delaware State Police.
Lieutenant colonel		Second in Command of the Delaware State Police.
Major		Member of the Executive Staff in charge of a specific duty.
Captain		Troop Commander of a Patrol Troop, or Commander of a specialized unit.
Lieutenant		Assistant Troop Commander, oversees the Troop's criminal or traffic activities or oversees a specialized unit.
Sergeant		Road supervisor for Troopers, or Supervisor of a specialty unit.
Master corporal		Troopers with 16+ years of experience.
Senior corporal		Troopers with 12 to 16 years of experience.
Corporal I		Troopers with 8 to 12 years of experience.
Corporal		Troopers with 4 to 8 years of experience.
Trooper 1st class		Troopers with 2 to 4 years of experience.
Trooper		New Troopers who have graduated the Delaware State Police Training Academy.

=== Firearms ===
Delaware State Troopers are issued the SIG Sauer P320 chambered in 9mm. Patrol rifles were updated in 2012 when the State Police purchased the SIG Sauer SIG516. The Remington 870 is the standard issue patrol shotgun.

== Fallen officers ==
Since the establishment of the Highway Traffic Police in 1919, the predecessor to the Delaware State Police, 20 officers have died while on duty, the most recent being December 23, 2025. 6 are by automobile crashes, 1 from duty-related illness, 5 from gunfire, 1 by motorcycle crash, 1 from getting struck by a vehicle, 1 from getting struck by a train, 1 by training accident, 1 during pursuit, 1 by Aircraft accident and 3 by vehicular assault.

== See also ==
- List of law enforcement agencies in Delaware
- Delaware Capitol Police
- State Police (United States)
- State Patrol
- Highway Patrol
