= Delaware State Department of Probation and Parole =

The Delaware State Department of Probation and Parole is the community corrections component of the Delaware Department of Corrections, falling under the Bureau of Community Corrections. The department has five offices throughout the state of Delaware, two in New Castle County, two in Sussex County and one in Kent. Delaware State Community Corrections officers function as both Probation and Parole officers within the state and are endowed with state law enforcement powers, allowing them to perform arrests, detainments and searches and seizures on probationers and parolees within the State of Delaware.
