= Howard Krein =

American surgeon (born 1966/1967)

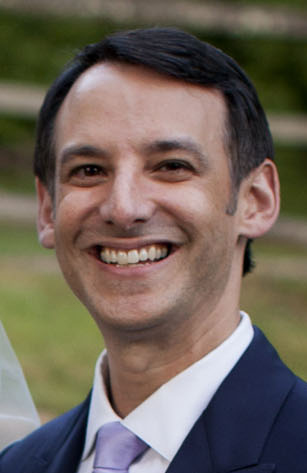
- Krein in 2012
- Born: Howard David Krein; 1966 or 1967 (age 59–60); Cherry Hill, New Jersey, U.S.
- Education: Rutgers University (BS, MS); University of Medicine and Dentistry of New Jersey (PhD); Thomas Jefferson University (MD)
- Occupations: Otolaryngologist; business executive
- Political party: Democratic
- Spouse: Ashley Biden (m. 2012; sep. 2025)
- Family: Biden (by marriage)

Howard David Krein (born 1966/1967) is an American otolaryngologist, and business executive. He was married to Ashley Biden, daughter of former U.S. president Joe Biden and First Lady Jill Biden, from 2012 till 2025 when they filed for divorce. He is a professor of otolaryngology at Thomas Jefferson University and is a founding partner and co-director of Thomas Jefferson University Hospital's Facial Aesthetic and Reconstructive Center. Krein is the chief medical officer at StartUp Health, a venture capital and health technology firm. He served on the Biden Cancer Initiative's board of directors from 2017 to 2019. Krein advised the Joe Biden 2020 presidential campaign on its COVID-19 pandemic response in an unofficial role.

== Early life and education ==
Howard David Krein was born and raised in Cherry Hill, New Jersey. He is the son of Stanley Krein, an insurance executive and former director of marketing at Aetna, and Brenda Ferne "Bunny" Lipner Krein, a physician assistant in cardiology at Cooper University Hospital. His family is Jewish.

As a teenager, Krein competed in CowTown, a weekly summertime rodeo competition in Penns Grove, New Jersey. He became a volunteer firefighter at the age of sixteen.

Krein graduated from Rutgers University with a bachelor's degree in biology and a master's degree in neuroscience. He obtained a doctoral degree in cell and development biology from the University of Medicine and Dentistry of New Jersey's Robert Wood Johnson Medical School in 1996. He graduated from medical school at Thomas Jefferson University in 2000. He completed an internship in emergency medicine and general surgery and a residency in otolaryngology at Jefferson. He completed a fellowship in facial plastic and reconstructive surgery at the Medical College of Virginia.

== Career ==
Krein is a board-certified otolaryngologist who also specializes in facial and reconstructive surgery. He has volunteered at the International Hospital for Children, operating on children with facial deformities in Belize. Krein also volunteers with Faces of Honor, where he performs reconstructive surgery for victims of domestic violence and veterans of the War in Afghanistan and the Iraqi conflict.

Krein has been on faculty at Thomas Jefferson University since 2007, and has served as the Senior Director of Health Policy and Innovation at the Sidney Kimmel Cancer Center since 2016. He is a founding partner and co-director of the hospital's Herbert Kean Center for Facial Aesthetics.

Since 2011 Krein has served as a Chief Medical Officer at StartUp Health, previously Organized Wisdom, a venture capital and health technology firm. The firm, whose chief executive officer is Krein's brother, lobbied the government on health industry technology regulations in 2018.

Krein served as an unofficial advisor to the Joe Biden 2020 presidential campaign on its COVID-19 pandemic response. StartUp Health has been running an initiative to invest in health care startups offering solutions to the global pandemic since March 2020. Krein's role with the Biden campaign while working as an executive of a health technology firm led to speculation about a potential conflict of interest. StartUp Health also described Krein as an advisor to the Obama administration in 2011. Krein stated that he does not have a formal role in the Biden campaign, but has participated in briefings on the coronavirus based on his experience treating patients and coordinating Thomas Jefferson University Hospital's response to the outbreak.

== Personal life ==
Krein began dating Ashley Biden, a social worker and daughter of U.S. president Joe Biden and First Lady Jill Biden, in 2010 after being introduced by her half-brother, Beau Biden. They married in June 2012 in a Catholic-Jewish interfaith ceremony at St. Joseph's on the Brandywine in Greenville, Delaware, officiated by a Catholic priest assisted by a rabbi. In August 2025, Biden filed for divorce from Krein.
