= Delaware Division of Alcohol and Tobacco Enforcement =

Delaware Division of Alcohol and Tobacco Enforcement patch

The Delaware Division of Alcohol and Tobacco Enforcement (DATE) is a law enforcement agency of the State of Delaware and is a division of the Delaware Department of Safety and Homeland Security (DSHS).

== About the Division ==
The Division of Alcohol and Tobacco Enforcement (DATE) is a state law enforcement agency. The mission of the agency is " To protect the health, safety and welfare of people in Delaware through the enforcement of state liquor and youth access to tobacco laws, while maintaining the highest state of preparedness for responding to threats against homeland security".

The Division primarily consists of Agents who conduct criminal and administrative investigations involving violations of the Delaware Liquor Control Act and the Administrative Rules of the Delaware Alcoholic Beverage Control Commissioner.

Agents of the Division are certified police officers for the State of Delaware. Agents have statewide jurisdiction and arrest powers and have full authority to enforce all laws of the State of Delaware, including liquor, drug, criminal and traffic statutes. Due to the nature of investigations, Agents primarily work in an undercover capacity. Agents conduct investigations that involve selling alcohol without a license, selling alcohol and/or tobacco products to minors, over-service of alcohol to intoxicated patrons, prostitution, illegal gambling on a licensed premises, illegal narcotics activity on a licensed premises, hidden ownership, tobacco smuggling, tax evasion, organized criminal activity, disorderly premises and violations of other criminal statutes and administrative rules. Agents also work with federal, state and local law enforcement agencies on multi-jurisdictional investigations. A significant aspect of their job involves working in hazardous and potentially volatile environments, including contact with individuals who may be under the influence of alcoholic beverages and/or and illegal narcotics, in possession of lethal weapons, or hostile towards law enforcement officers.

Agents make arrests of persons for violations of state laws, execute search warrants and arrest warrants, and complete a variety of investigative and administrative reports. These reports are used when the Agent testifies as a witness during criminal court trials and/or administrative proceedings.

Agents also perform internal and perimeter security at the state Emergency Operations Center (EOC) during declared state of emergency events. Agents assist liquor licensees, their employees, and the public, by instructing the Delaware Trained Alcoholic Beverage Server (TABS) training program. State law mandates that any person who sells, serves, or dispenses alcoholic beverages in the State of Delaware, must complete this training program.

Agents conduct educational presentations to citizens, civic associations, community groups, elementary school, middle school, high school, and college students, related to state alcohol and tobacco laws and the dangers of alcohol and tobacco use. Agents also provide training to other police agencies in the areas of alcohol and tobacco law enforcement. Agents work in partnership with citizens, the community, and other law enforcement agencies, to address locations that may be negatively affecting the quality of life and/or public safety, in order to encourage voluntary compliance and create safer communities.

== History of the Division ==
During the era of prohibition (1920–1933), the State of Delaware created the state Department of Prohibition. This agency would be the forerunner to the eventual creation of the Division of Alcohol and Tobacco Enforcement. One of the more notorious members of the state Department of Prohibition was a man named Harold “Three Gun” Wilson. A news article from the Newark Post, dated October 1, 1931 gives some insight into the activities of the state Department of Prohibition and “Three Gun Wilson”. The news article states the following:

“Three Gun Wilson swoops down on Newark bootleggers”

“Efforts will be made by the Prohibition Department in Wilmington to padlock five places in Delaware, three of them filling stations, one a Negro café in Rehoboth and the third a private residence in Newark, as a result of raids made under the direction of Harold D. Wilson, Deputy Prohibition Administrator”.

In 1933, after the repeal of Prohibition, the State of Delaware chose the “open” state system of alcohol regulation. In 1933, the first liquor enforcement personnel after the repeal of Prohibition, appeared in Delaware. These early liquor enforcement personnel were commonly referred to as “revenuers”. Most of these early “revenuers” received their positions through political connections, since they were often in charge of regulating powerful and politically connected business owners. From 1933 to 1955, there was no real formal system of alcohol regulation in Delaware, except for a few laws regulating the sale, manufacture, licensing and taxation of alcohol.

In 1955, Delaware created the Delaware Alcoholic Beverage Control Commission. The Commission was charged with regulating alcohol and the alcohol industry within the state. A formal system of licensing, laws and administrative rules was enacted. The Commission was charged with the regulation of Title 4 of the Delaware Code (Delaware Liquor Control Act) and a system of administrative rules. The original Commission was a five-member body. Commissioners were appointed by the Governor and confirmed by the state senate. One Commissioner was from New Castle County, one Commissioner was from Kent County, one Commissioner was from Sussex County and one Commissioner was from the City of Wilmington. One chairperson of the Commission was also appointed and could be from any part of the state. Commissioners could be from any political party, but there could not be a majority of Commissioner's from any one political party.

In 1955, after the formal system of licensing, laws and rules had been created, an enforcement bureau was also created. This early enforcement bureau was known as the Division of Alcoholic Beverage Control or “ABC” and was responsible for the enforcement of Title 4 of the Delaware Code and the Administrative Rules of the Commission. The Division became an agency of the state Department of Administrative Services.

In the early 1960s, the “Revenuers” job titles were officially changed to “Liquor Inspector”. These liquor inspectors made arrests of bootleggers and those who violated other state laws and administrative rules related to alcohol . No formal law enforcement training was required to become a liquor inspector.

In 1969, Delaware made it mandatory for any person involved in policing to attend a formal police academy training program. Liquor Inspectors from the Division began to attend the Delaware State Police academy in order to receive formal police officer training and certification. They performed their duties under the title of Liquor Inspector until the mid-1980s.

In the mid-1980s, the title of Liquor Inspector was changed to Agent. Agents were commonly referred to as “ABC Agents” by the public and liquor licensees. Their duties changed considerably during this period, when the minimum legal drinking age (MLDA) was raised to twenty one on January 1, 1984. With the passage of this legislation, a focus on underage sales and the underage possession/consumption of alcohol became the major focus of ABC Agents. Agents also began to become involved with other types of illegal activity at licensed establishments. Examples include illegal narcotics activity, over-service of alcohol, prostitution, disorderly establishments, tax evasion, illegal gambling and organized criminal activity.

In 1991, the question was raised as to the police authority of ABC Agents. Although not specifically defined as police officers under state law, the state Attorney General's Office, under the leadership of then Attorney General Charles M. Oberly III, issued an opinion stating that ABC Agents were in fact police officers with statewide jurisdiction and arrest authority even though they were not defined as such under state law. The opinion also stated that ABC Agents had the authority to arrest persons in Delaware for any offense, not just for offenses related to alcohol, since if the General Assembly had wanted to limit the police powers of Agents, they would have done so.

In 1991, Delaware also enacted legislation that required all servers of alcohol to take a class and pass a test related to the responsible service of alcohol. This legislation and the resulting class became known as “server training”.

In 1994, the Division was transferred from the Department of Administrative Services to the Department of Public Safety. This transfer occurred since the Division was an agency with law enforcement duties and it would be better served by the transfer.

In 1998, the Division and its agents began to enforce the mandatory federal Synar amendment and associated state laws related to youth access to tobacco products. The Synar amendment stated that all states must test a minimum of 10% licensed tobacco retailers within their borders to ensure that they are not selling tobacco products to anyone under eighteen years of age. If any state failed to comply with the Synar Amendment or had a compliance rate of less than 80%, they would lose federal health grant monies. Rather than only test the minimum required 10% of licensed tobacco retailers in Delaware, the Division instituted a policy that all (100%) licensed tobacco retailers would be tested at least one time per year. This policy far exceed the requirements of the Synar Amendment.

In 2000, the five-member Delaware Alcoholic Beverage Control Commission was dissolved by the state legislature and the joint sunset committee. The sunset committee is a process where state agencies are periodically reviewed and a determination is made to either dissolve the agency, keep the agency in its current form, or modify the agency. As a result, a new agency was created by legislation and named the Office of the Alcoholic Beverage Control Commissioner. A single person called the Alcoholic Beverage Control Commissioner was also created. The single person Commissioner assumed the duties of the former five-person Commission. The Commissioner is appointed by the governor and confirmed by the state senate. The Office of the Alcoholic Beverage Control Commissioner became a separate and distinct agency from the Division of Alcoholic Beverage Control.

In 2000, the Division of Alcoholic Beverage Control was renamed the Division of Alcoholic Beverage Control and Tobacco Enforcement by legislation. Agents of the Division were formally added to Title 11 of the Delaware Code defining them as police officers, even though they had been performing the duties of law enforcement officers for years prior to the official legislation.

In 2003, the Department of Public Safety was renamed the Department of Safety and Homeland Security.

In 2003, as a result of the events that occurred on September 11, 2001, agents were also charged with performing homeland security duties. Specifically, agents of the Division are responsible to provide internal and external perimeter security at the state Emergency Operations Center (EOC) during declared state of emergency events to ensure that the EOC is able to function in a secure manner during these events.

In 2004, the Division of Alcoholic Beverage Control and Tobacco Enforcement was renamed the Division of Alcohol and Tobacco Enforcement by legislation. This name change occurred in order to reflect the increased job duties of tobacco enforcement by the Division and also to avoid confusion with the Office of the Alcoholic Beverage Control Commissioner. Agents of the Division used to be known as “ABC Agents” but are now known as “ATE Agents”.

In 2010 the Division of Alcohol and Tobacco Enforcement partnered with the newly formed Division of Gaming Enforcement. The DGE is composed of an agent from Division of Alcohol and Tobacco Enforcement and troopers from the Delaware State Police. The investigative specialization of the sworn members of Alcohol and Tobacco Enforcement and the Delaware State Police brought a wide array of investigative experience to maintain the integrity of the gaming industry.

The Division and its agents have existed in some form since at least 1920. It has evolved considerably since its early days of tax collection and the investigation of bootleggers. Agents of the Division perform criminal and administrative investigations that encompass a variety of areas. Agents not only conduct investigations related to alcohol offenses, but also offenses that involve narcotics, tax evasion, tobacco enforcement, prostitution, organized criminal activity, illegal gambling, fraudulent identification and homeland security.

== See also ==
- List of law enforcement agencies in Delaware
