= Howard R. Young Correctional Institution =

Prison in Delaware, United States

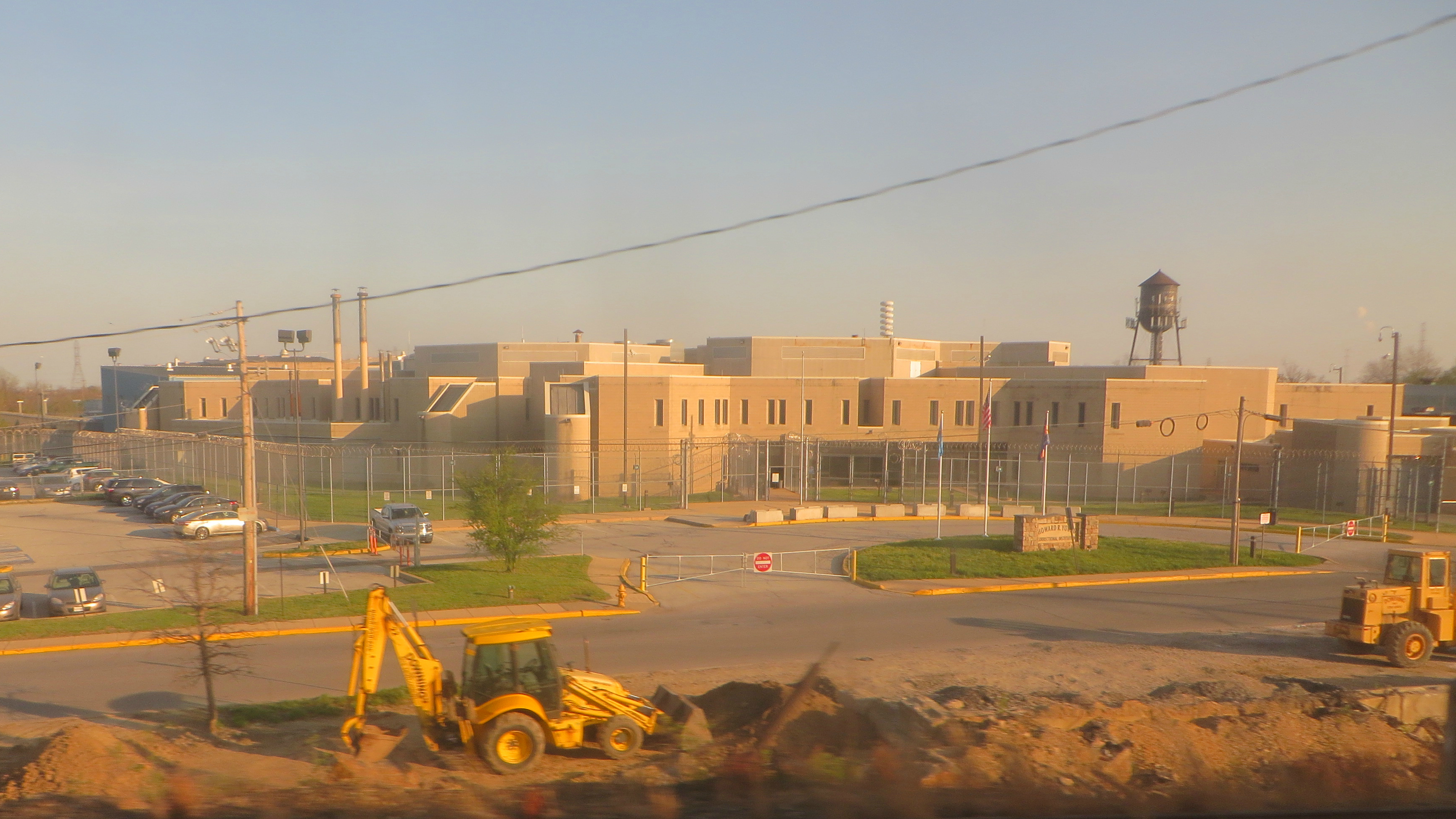
- Interactive map of Howard R. Young Correctional Institution
- Location: 1301 E 12th Street Wilmington, Delaware; 39°44′29″N 75°31′47″W
- Status: open
- Capacity: 1500
- Opened: 1982
- Managed by: Delaware Department of Correction

The Howard R. Young Correctional Institution, colloquially known as Gander Hill Prison, is a state prison for male inmates in Wilmington, New Castle County, Delaware, owned and operated by the Delaware Department of Correction. The facility first opened in 1982, and houses 1500 inmates.
