= Delaware Department of Correction =

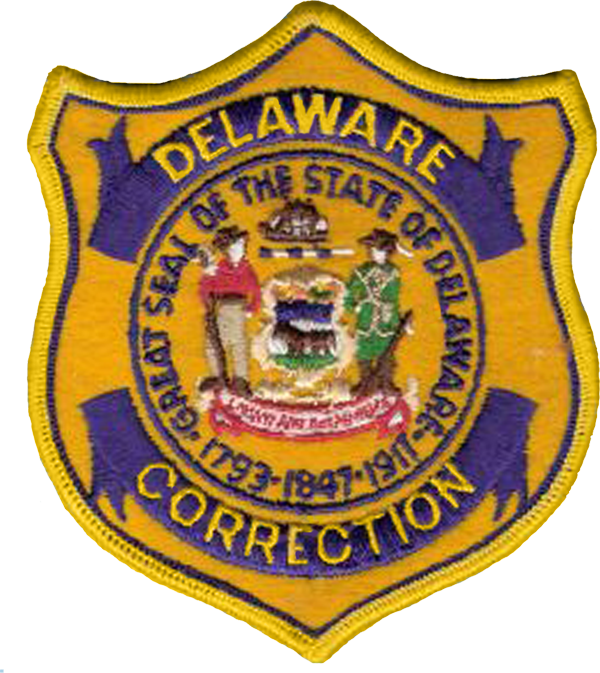

Jurisdictional structure
- Operations jurisdiction: Delaware, USA
- Map of Delaware Department of Correction's jurisdiction
- General nature: Local civilian police

Operational structure
- Headquarters: Dover, Delaware
- Agency executive: Terra Taylor, 11th Commissioner of the Delaware Department of Correction
- Parent agency: Delaware Department of Correction

Website
- https://doc.delaware.gov/

Terra Taylor
- Incumbent
- Assumed office July 6, 2023
- Preceded by: Monroe Hudson
- Website: doc.delaware.gov/views/office_of_commissioner.blade.shtml

The Delaware Department of Correction is a state agency of Delaware that manages state prisons. It has its headquarters in the Central Administration Building in Dover. At one time the headquarters was located in Smyrna.

== Prisons ==
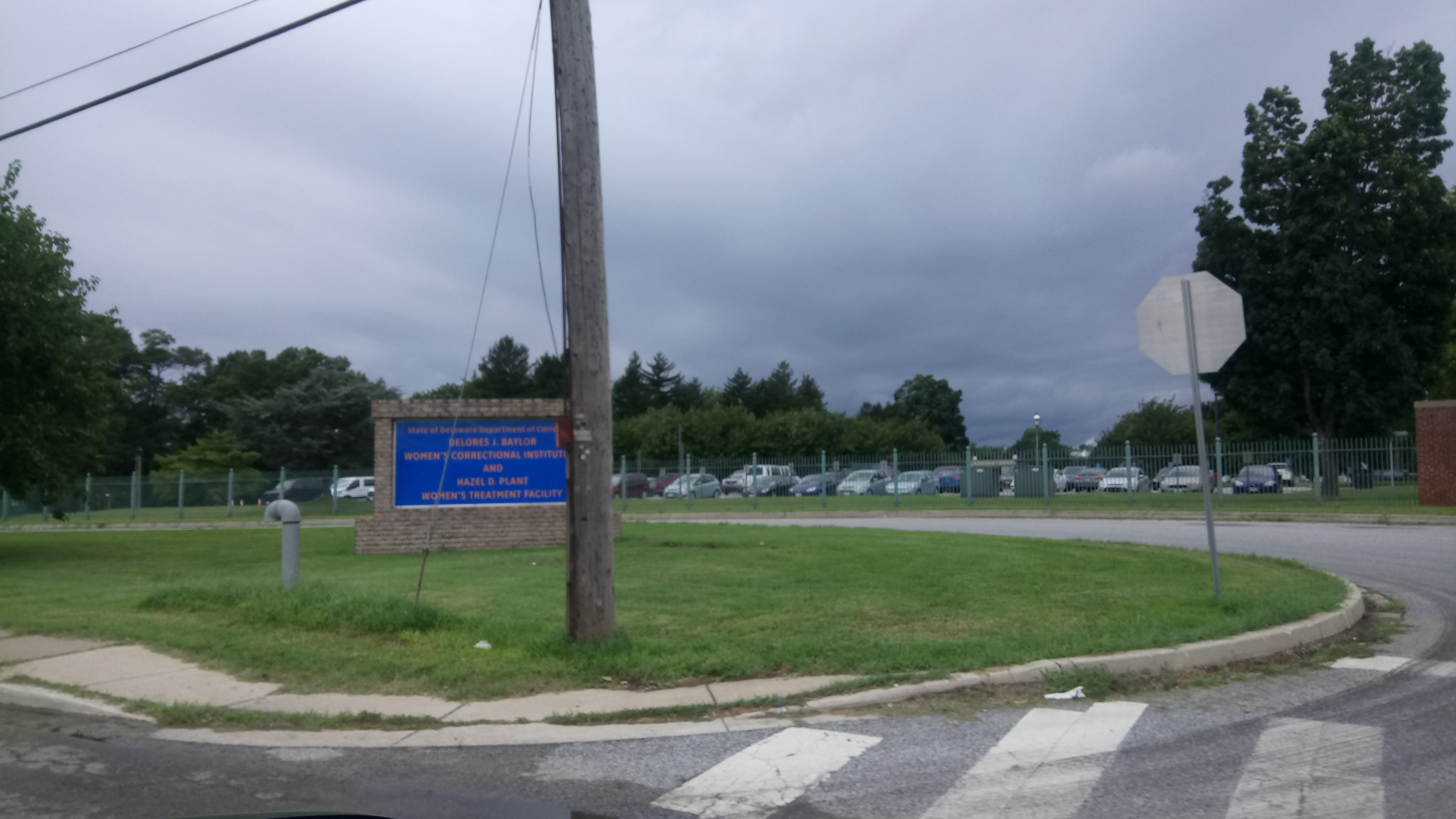
Delores J. Baylor Women's Correctional Institution

- Delores J. Baylor Women's Correctional Institution (inmate capacity 320)
- Howard R. Young Correctional Institution (capacity 1,500)
- James T. Vaughn Correctional Center (formerly Delaware Correctional Center) (capacity 2,600)
- Sussex Correctional Institution (capacity 1,206)

== Community Corrections ==
- Central Violation of Probation Center
- Hazel D. Plant Women's Treatment Facility
- John L. Webb Correctional Facility
- Morris Community Corrections Center
- Plummer Community Corrections Center
- Probation and Parole / Day Reporting Centers
- Sussex Community Corrections Center
- Sussex Violation of Probation
- Sussex Work Release Center

== Intelligence Operations Center (IOC) ==
The Delaware Department of Correction, Intelligence Operations Center serves as a central hub for intelligence gathering and analysis, enhancing the department's ability to respond to emerging threats and manage the complexities of correctional facility operations. By leveraging advanced technology and analytical techniques, the analysts contribute to ensuring the safety of both staff and inmates, as well as the surrounding community.

== Operations ==
60% of all admissions into the Delaware correctional system go to the Howard R. Young Correctional Institution, and that facility houses the majority of Delaware's detainee population.

The male death row was at the James T. Vaughn Correctional Center (JTVCC), while the female death row was at the Delores J. Baylor Women's Correctional Institution. Executions occurred at JTVCC, as it housed the execution chamber.

== Line of duty deaths ==
Including preceding agencies, 3 officer and 1 K9 of the Delaware Department of Corrections have been killed in the line of duty.

== See also ==
- List of law enforcement agencies in Delaware
- List of United States state correction agencies
- List of U.S. state prisons
- Prison
