= 2026 United States Senate election in Delaware =

- November 3, 2026
- Turnout: 47.49%
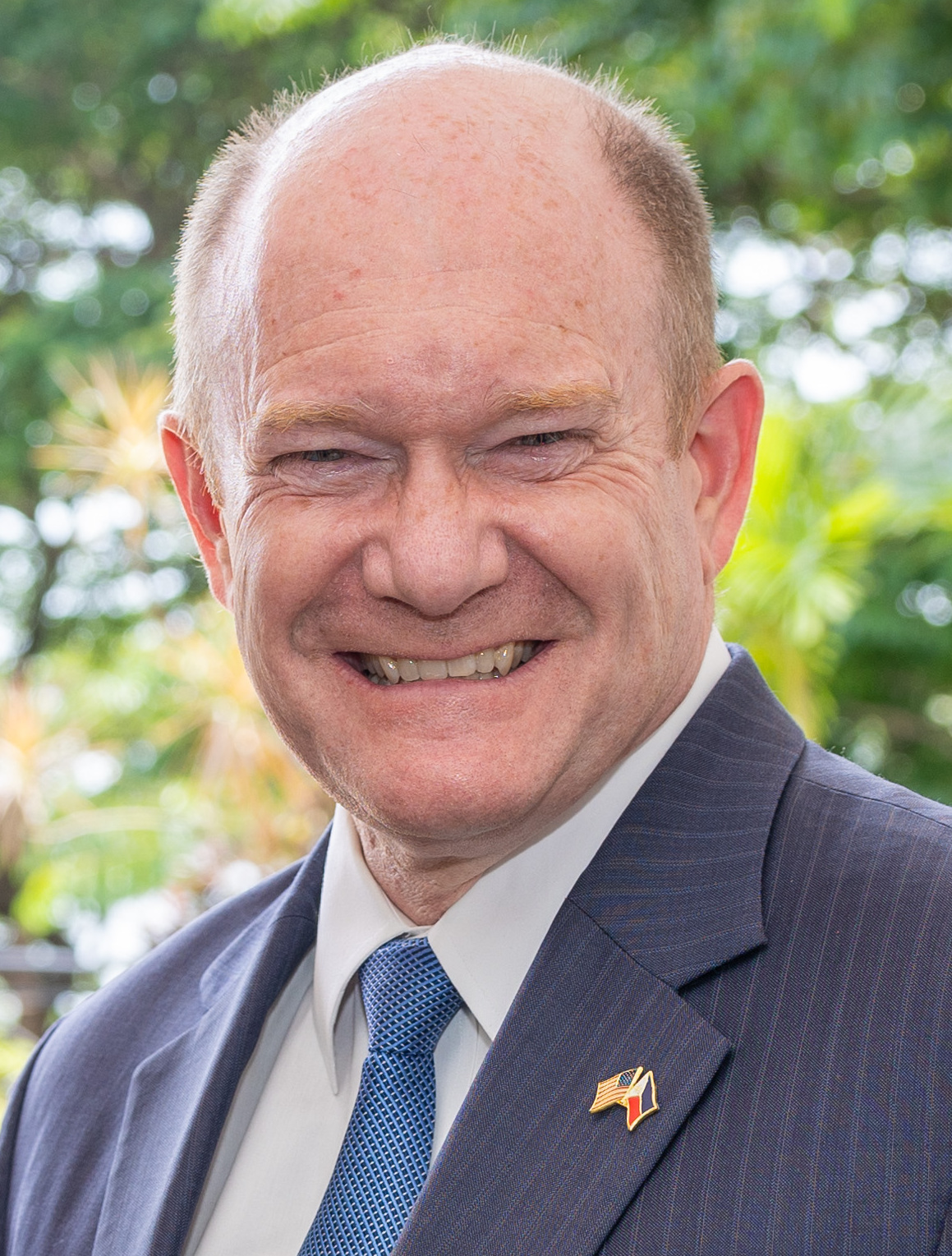

Nominee	Chris Coons	Michael Katz
Party	Democratic	Republican
Popular vote	240,587	137,837
Percentage	63.35%	36.30%
- Coons: 50–60% 60–70% 70–80% 80–90% >90% Katz: 50–60% 60–70% 70–80% No votes
U.S. senator before election
Chris Coons
Democratic
Elected U.S. senator
Chris Coons
Democratic

The 2026 United States Senate election in Delaware was held on November 3, 2026, to elect a member of the United States Senate to represent the state of Delaware. Democratic incumbent Chris Coons was re-elected to a third full term, defeating Republican former state senator Michael Katz.

Primary elections took place on September 15. Coons won the Democratic nomination with 78% of the vote against minimal opposition. Katz, who served as a Democrat in the state Senate, won the Republican nomination with 77.3% of the vote against U.S. Army War College instructor John Shulli.

Coons held onto Kent County, a swing county that voted against him in 2010 and 2014 before flipping in 2020. He also flipped Republican leaning Sussex County, making it the first time the county voted for a Democrat in a statewide race since the 2012 races for Senate, the at-large House seat, and governor.

== Democratic primary ==
=== Candidates ===
==== Nominee ====
- Chris Coons, incumbent U.S. senator (2010–present)

==== Eliminated in primary ====
- Jeff Appelhans, former teacher and historian
- Eric No-Trump Hansen, businessman and Republican nominee for U.S. Senate in 2024
- Mary Louve, naval architect and Marine engineer

==== Withdrawn ====
- Christopher Beardsley, former federal employee (running for state senate)

=== Endorsements ===
Chris Coons

U.S. senators

- Lisa Blunt Rochester, Delaware (2025–present)

U.S. representatives

- Sarah McBride, DE-AL (2025–present)

Statewide officials

- Kathy Jennings, attorney general of Delaware (2019–present)
- Matt Meyer, governor of Delaware (2025–present)

Political parties

- Delaware Democratic Party

Labor unions

- American Federation of Government Employees

Organizations

- 314 Action
- AIPAC
- Giffords
- J Street
- Jewish Democratic Council of America
- Joint Action Committee for Political Affairs
- League of Conservation Voters
- Planned Parenthood Action Fund
- Population Connection

=== Fundraising ===
Campaign finance reports as of August 26, 2026
Candidate	Raised	Spent	Cash on hand
Jeff Appelhans (D)	$1,468	$83	$1,385
Chris Coons (D)	$6,897,138	$3,944,267	$4,793,384
Chris Beardsley (D)	$22,356	$13,165	$9,191
Source: Federal Election Commission

=== Polling ===
Poll source	Date(s) administered	Sample size (Note: Key: A – all adults RV – registered voters LV – likely voters V – unclear)	Margin of error	Jeff Appelhans	Chris Coons	Eric Hansen	Mary Louve	Other	Undecided
RedBox Research (Note: Poll sponsored by A Fight Worth Having super PAC)	September 13, 2026	1,099 (RV)	± 3.3%	6%	64%	2%	4%	8% (Note: "Someone else" & "Would not vote in this race" with 3%; "Prefer not to answer" with 2%; "Did not vote in this race" with 0%)	17%

=== Results ===
Primary results by county: Coons: 70–80%; 80–90%

Democratic primary results
Party	Candidate	Votes	%
Democratic	Chris Coons (incumbent)	68,154	78.0
Democratic	Jeff Appelhans	9,294	10.6
Democratic	Mary Louve	6,577	7.5
Democratic	Eric No-Trump Hansen	3,367	3.9
Total votes		87,392	100.0

== Republican primary ==
=== Candidates ===
==== Nominee ====
- Michael Katz, former Democratic state senator (2009–2013) and Independent Party nominee for U.S. Senate in 2024

==== Eliminated in primary ====
- John Shulli, instructor at the U.S. Army War College

=== Endorsements ===
Michael Katz

Executive branch officials

- Julianne Murray, former United States attorney for the District of Delaware (2025)

State legislators

- David Lawson, SD-15 (2010–present)
- Daniel Short, former minority leader of the House of Representatives (2013–2023) from HD-39 (2006–present)

Political parties

- Independent Party of Delaware
- Delaware Republican Party
- Sussex County Republican Party

Organizations

- College Republicans of America
- University of Delaware College Republicans
John Shulli

Executive branch officials

- Michael Flynn, former national security advisor (2017)

State legislators

- Lyndon Yearick, HD-34 (2014–present)

=== Fundraising ===
Campaign finance reports as of August 26, 2026
Candidate	Raised	Spent	Cash on hand
John Shulli (R)	$118,334	$109,920	$8,414
Michael Katz (R)	$159,367	$60,954	$98,413
Source: Federal Election Commission

=== Results ===
Primary results by county: Katz: 70–80%; 80–90%

Republican primary results
Party	Candidate	Votes	%
Republican	Michael Katz	30,896	77.3
Republican	John Shulli	9,052	22.7
Total votes		39,948	100.0

== General election ==
=== Predictions ===
Source	Ranking	As of
The Cook Political Report	Solid D	November 2, 2026
Decision Desk HQ	Safe D	November 3, 2026
The Economist (Note: The Economist's prediction model uses unconventional terminology. For the purpose of equivalency, their "Very Likely" ratings are formatted as a "Likely" rating while "Likely" ratings are formatted as a "Lean" rating.)	Safe D	November 3, 2026
FiftyPlusOne	Safe D	November 3, 2026
Fox News	Solid D	November 1, 2026
Inside Elections	Solid D	October 29, 2026
MS NOW	Safe D	October 29, 2026
NBC News	Solid D	November 3, 2026
RealClearPolitics	Solid D	November 2, 2026
Sabato's Crystal Ball	Safe D	November 2, 2026
Silver Bulletin	Solid D	November 3, 2026
Split Ticket	Safe D	November 2, 2026

=== Post-primary endorsements ===
Chris Coons (D)

Labor unions

- National Education Association

=== Fundraising ===
Campaign finance reports as of October 14, 2026
Candidate	Raised	Spent	Cash on hand
Chris Coons (D)	$7,685,072	$4,493,874	$5,031,711
Michael Katz (R)	$190,416	$174,332	$16,085
Source: Federal Election Commission

=== Results ===
2026 United States Senate election in Delaware
Party	Candidate	Votes	%	±%
Democratic	Chris Coons (incumbent)	240,587	63.35	+3.91
Republican	Michael Katz	137,837	36.30	–1.60
Write-in		1,330	0.35	N/A
Total votes		379,754	100.0	N/A
Democratic hold				

Counties that flipped from Republican to Democratic

- Sussex (largest city: Seaford)

== Notes ==
Partisan clients

== See also ==
- 2026 Delaware elections
