= 2026 Delaware Attorney General election =

- November 3, 2026
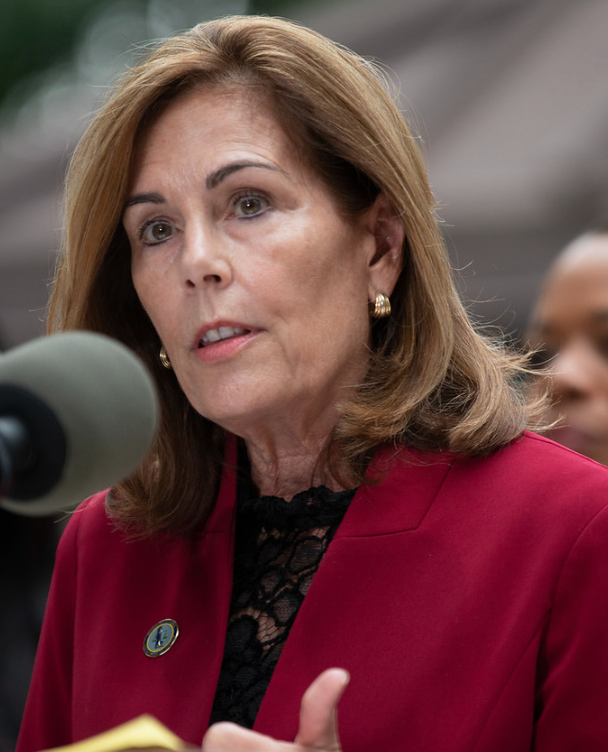

| Candidate | Kathy Jennings | Dave Graham |
| Party | Democratic | Republican |
| Popular vote | 240,429 | 137,464 |
| Percentage | 63.6% | 36.4% |
- Jennings: 50–60% 60–70% 70–80% 80–90% >90% Graham: 50–60% 60–70% 70–80% 80–90% No votes
Attorney General before election
Kathy Jennings
Democratic
Elected Attorney General
Kathy Jennings
Democratic

The 2026 Delaware Attorney General election was held on November 3, 2026, to elect the Attorney General of Delaware. Primary elections were held on September 15, 2026.

Incumbent Democratic attorney general Kathy Jennings, who was re-elected in 2022 with 53.8% of the vote, ran for re-election to a third term in office. In the Democratic Primary, she won re-nomination after winning a three-way primary race with 71.2% of the vote. She went on to defeat Republican David C. Graham in the general election with 63.6% of the vote, winning all three counties in the state for the first time since 2012.

== Democratic primary ==
=== Candidates ===
==== Nominee ====
- Kathy Jennings, incumbent attorney general

==== Eliminated in primary ====
- Dwayne Bensing, legal director for the Delaware ACLU
- Patty Rickman, small business owner

=== Endorsements ===
Dwayne Bensing

Organizations

- LGBTQ Victory Fund
Kathy Jennings

Statewide officials

- Matt Meyer, governor of Delaware (2025–present)

Political parties

- Delaware Democratic Party

Organizations

- Brady PAC
- EMILYs List
- Giffords
- National Women's Political Caucus
- Reproductive Freedom for All
- Sierra Club Delaware

=== Polling ===
| Poll source | Date(s) administered | Sample size (Note: Key: A – all adults RV – registered voters LV – likely voters V – unclear) | Margin of error | Dwayne Bensing | Kathy Jennings | Patty Rickman | Other | Undecided |
|---|---|---|---|---|---|---|---|---|
| RedBox Research (Note: Poll sponsored by A Fight Worth Having super PAC) | September 13, 2026 | 1,087 (RV) | ± 3.3% | 13% | 51% | 2% | 10% (Note: "Prefer not to answer", "Someone else" & "Would not vote in this race" with 3%; "Did not vote in this race" with 1%) | 25% |

=== Results ===
Primary results by county: Jennings: 60–70%; 70–80%

Democratic primary results
| Party | Candidate | Votes | % |
|---|---|---|---|
| Democratic | Kathy Jennings (incumbent) | 61,191 | 71.2 |
| Democratic | Dwayne Bensing | 20,359 | 23.7 |
| Democratic | Patty Rickman | 4,417 | 5.1 |
| Total votes | | 85,967 | 100.0 |

== Republican primary ==
=== Candidates ===
==== Nominee ====
- Dave Graham, U.S. Army veteran

== General election ==
=== Results ===
2026 Delaware Attorney General general election
| Party | Candidate | Votes | % |
|---|---|---|---|
| Democratic | Kathy Jennings (incumbent) | 240,429 | 63.6 |
| Republican | David C. Graham | 137,464 | 36.4 |
| Total votes | | 377,893 | 100.0 |
| Democratic hold | | | |

== Notes ==
Partisan clients
