= Richard S. Gebelein =

American judge (1946–2021)

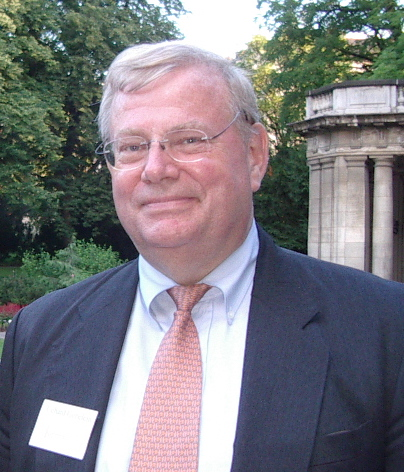
- Judge Richard S. Gebelein

International Judge on the Court of Bosnia and Herzegovina
- In office 2005–2006
- Appointed by: Paddy Ashdown

Judge of the Delaware Superior Court
- In office October 5, 1984 – August 31, 2005
- Appointed by: Pete du Pont

40th Attorney General of Delaware
- In office January 16, 1979 – January 18, 1983
- Governor: Pete du Pont
- Preceded by: Richard R. Wier Jr.
- Succeeded by: Charles Oberly

Personal details
- Born: June 8, 1946 Darby, Pennsylvania
- Died: December 22, 2021 (aged 75) Wilmington, Delaware
- Party: Republican
- Education: University of Pittsburgh (BS); Villanova University (JD)
- Awards: Legion of Merit; Bronze Star Medal; Commendation Medal; Achievement Medal

Military service
- Branch/service: Delaware Army National Guard
- Rank: Colonel
- Battles/wars: Operation Enduring Freedom; War in Afghanistan

Richard Stephen Gebelein (June 8, 1946 – December 22, 2021) was an American politician and jurist who served as the Attorney General of Delaware from 1979 through 1983, as a judge on the Delaware Superior Court from 1984 through 2005, and as an international judge in the Court of Bosnia and Herzegovina. He was a member of the Republican Party.

== Early life ==
Richard Stephen Gebelein was born on 8 June 1946, in Darby, Pennsylvania. At an early age, Gebelein moved with his family to Longwood Estates, Chadds Ford, Pennsylvania, and attended St. Joseph on the Brandywine for his early education. Raised a Roman Catholic, Gebelein attended Salesianum School in Wilmington, Delaware, for High School and graduated class of 1964 with honors in mathematics, science, and religion. Gebelein was later inducted into Salesianum's Hall of Fame in 2017.

In 1980, Gebelein was married to his wife, Anna, and together they raised three children.

== Career ==
=== Early career ===
Gebelein received his Bachelor of Science in Mathematics from the University of Pittsburgh in 1967. At age 21, Gebelein was elected the youngest magistrate in the Magisterial District Courts of the Commonwealth of Pennsylvania. Gebelein went on to earn his Juris Doctor degree from Villanova University School of Law in 1970.

After graduating law school, Gebelein began work for the State of Delaware as a law clerk for the Honorable William Duffy in the Delaware Court of Chancery and Honorable Vincent J. Bifferato, Jr. in the Superior Court of Delaware. Gebelein was admitted to the state Bars of the Delaware Supreme Court and Commonwealth of Pennsylvania in November 1971.

In 1971, Gebelein was appointed as a Deputy Attorney General to the Delaware Department of Justice under Attorney General W. Laird Stabler, Jr. and served in that role for 3 years. Gebelein was appointed as Delaware State Solicitor and admitted to the Bar of the United States Supreme Court In 1974.

In 1975, Gebelein was appointed Chief Deputy Public Defender for the State of Delaware and served in that role until leaving the Delaware Department of Justice in 1976 to practice law as a partner in Wilson A. Whittington, PA.

In 1979, Gebelein returned the Delaware Department of Justice to serve as Attorney General after defeating incumbent Attorney General Richard R. Wier, Jr. in the 1978 General Election.

Attorney General Candidate	Political Party	Popular Vote	
Richard S. Gebelein	Republican	88,896	56.14%
Richard R. Wier, Jr.	Democrat	68,204	43.07%
William M. Walker, Sr.	American	1,239	0.78%

=== Attorney General of Delaware ===
From 1979 through 1983, Gebelein served as the Attorney General of Delaware. As Attorney General, Gebelein oversaw statewide criminal prosecutions and investigations of organized crime, including the indictment and prosecution of Frank Sheeren for labor racketeering.

From 1980 through 1983, Gebelein served as a member of the Legislative and chairman of the Institutions and Corrections Subcommittees of the National Association of Attorneys General as well as the member of the United States Department of Justice, Executive Working Group.

In the 1982 Delaware General Election for Attorney General, Gebelein lost his re-election efforts to Charles M. Oberly III.

Attorney General Candidate	Political Party	Popular Vote	
Charles M. Oberly, III	Democrat	92,917	49.90%
Richard S. Gebelein	Republican	91,740	49.26%
Vernon L. Etzel	Libertarian	783	0.42%
Traves V. Brownlee	American	782	0.42%

=== Superior Court of Delaware ===
In 1984, after losing his re-election bid as Attorney General, Gebelein was asked by the Delaware Supreme Court to serve as Delaware’s first Disciplinary Counsel on the newly established Board of Professional Responsibility. In that role, Gebelein was tasked with enforcing the Board’s attorney rules of conduct, investigating, and prosecuting matters related to ethical violations.

Subsequently, Gebelein was appointed by Governor of Delaware Pete du Pont to the Delaware Superior Court as an Associate Judge and took office on October 5, 1984.

In 1989, Judge Gebelein served as the trial judge during the prosecution of Steven Brian Pennell, The Route 40 Killer. During the course of the trial, Judge Gebelein set legal precedent by admitting DNA collected from carpet fibers into the case as absolute legal evidence. It was the first trial in the United States to use DNA as legal evidence in such a manner.

During his tenure with the Delaware Superior Court, Judge Gebelein served as a commissioner (1985) and later the chairman (1988) of Delaware’s Sentencing Accountability Commission, which was tasked by the Delaware General Assembly to exam suitable punishment or supervision alternatives to incarceration for non-violent criminal offenders.

Judge Gebelein's work on establishment of the Delaware Superior Court Drug Court received national recognition.

In 1994, Gebelein was a founding member of the National Association of Drug Court Professionals.

Gebelein testified as an expert on Drug Courts before the United States Congress in 1995 and 1996.

=== Military Service ===
In 1979, Gebelein joined the Delaware Army National Guard as an Assistant Staff Judge Advocate in the Judge Advocate General’s Corps.

From September 2004 through March 2005, Gebelein, a Colonel in the Delaware Army National Guard, and Staff Judge Advocate General, was deployed to Afghanistan, and assisted in helping to rebuild its judicial system as Rule of Law Officer for the Combined Forces Command during Operation Enduring Freedom.

Colonel Gebelein was awarded several commendations during his military career including: the Legion of Merit, the Bronze Star, Army Commendation Medal, and Army Achievement Medal. Additionally, Gebelein received the Delaware Conspicuous Service Cross and the Delaware National Guard Medal.

=== Court of Bosnia and Herzegovina ===
On August 1, 2005, Paddy Ashdown, High Representative for Bosnia and Herzegovina, appointed Gebelein to Section I for War Crimes of the Criminal and Appellate Divisions and to Section II for Organised Crime, Economic Crime and Corruption of the Criminal and Appellate Divisions of the Court of Bosnia and Herzegovina. He was appointed for a two-year term.

On August 31, 2005, he retired from the Delaware Superior Court in order to become an international judge on the Court of Bosnia and Herzegovina. He also retired from the Delaware Army National Guard in order to assume this position.

=== Return to Delaware and later career ===
In late-2006, Judge Gebelein was chosen by Beau Biden, Delaware attorney general-elect, to serve as his chief deputy attorney general. Biden, a Democrat, received some praise for reaching across party lines in appointing Gebelein, a Republican. Gebelein managed the Office of the Attorney General during Biden's military deployment in 2008.

Gebelein served as chief of party for the USAID Justice Sector Development Project II, a three component Rule of Law Project in Bosnia and Herzegovina. The multi-year project was designed to enhance the independence and effectiveness of the judicial sector in Bosnia and Herzegovina.

Gebelein taught law and legal studies at various times through his professional career at the University of Delaware, Wilmington College, Widener University School of Law, and Rowan University.

== Death ==
Gebelein died on December 22, 2021, after a long battle with cancer.
