= 1990 United States Senate election in Delaware =

- November 6, 1990
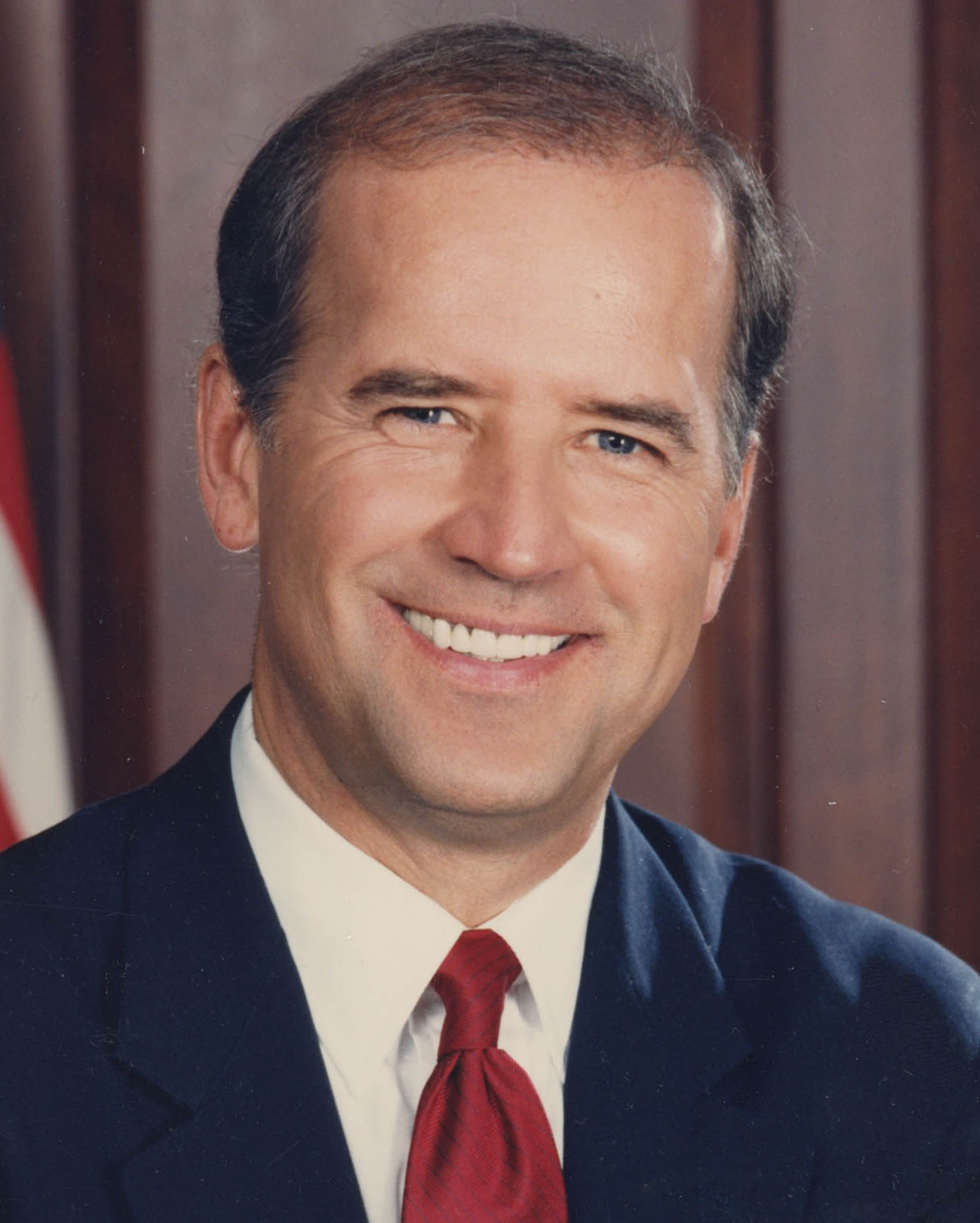

| Nominee | Joe Biden | M. Jane Brady |
| Party | Democratic | Republican |
| Popular vote | 112,918 | 64,554 |
| Percentage | 62.68% | 35.83% |
- Biden: 50–60% 60–70% 70–80% 80–90% >90%
U.S. senator before election
Joe Biden
Democratic
Elected U.S. Senator
Joe Biden
Democratic

The 1990 United States Senate election in Delaware was held on November 6, 1990. Incumbent Democratic U.S. Senator Joe Biden won re-election to a fourth term, defeating Republican challenger Deputy Attorney General of Delaware M. Jane Brady. Brady decided to run because she felt that Biden's liberal voting record did not reflect the political positions of Delawareans.

Brady's campaign raised around $245,000, but she was heavily outspent by Biden, who raised around $2.8 million. Libertarian candidate Lee Rosenbaum also ran but only received less than two percent of the vote. Debates between the three candidates occurred in late October and early November. Issues for the campaign included fiscal responsibility, the president's veto power, and the role of Congress in the nation's diplomatic relations.

The election had a turnout rate of under 40% of registered voters. Biden won in a landslide with over 60% of the vote, improving on his 1984 margin, winning all three counties and all 41 State House of Representatives districts.

== Background ==
In 1984, despite Ronald Reagan's landslide presidential victory in the concurrent election, Joe Biden won re-election to a third term, defeating Republican challenger John M. Burris with a little over 60% of the vote.

Due to Biden's popularity, Delaware Republicans struggled to find a candidate to challenge him. He was expected to easily win re-election. The election was held as part of the midterm election cycle of Republican President George H. W. Bush's term. Historically, the president's party struggles during the midterms.

== Candidates ==
Nominees

- Joe Biden (Democratic), incumbent Delaware senator running for a fourth term
- M. Jane Brady (Republican), a criminal prosecutor and Deputy Attorney General of Delaware
- Lee Rosenbaum (Libertarian), a data communications technician

Eliminated in primaries

- David S. DeRiemer (Libertarian)

=== Primaries ===
At the 1990 Delaware Democratic Party state convention, Biden revealed that he was running for a fourth term, stating that he made the decision to seek re-election during a hospital stay. Biden echoed this statement in an interview with C-SPAN, saying that it was "[n]ot difficult at all. Ironically, it was less difficult than any of the other decisions." He added that he came significantly closer to not running in 1978 and 1984.

The Delaware Republican Party struggled to find a candidate to challenge Biden. Party chairman Basil Battaglia reached out to the newspaper The News Journal to help find candidates. The party eventually reached out to Deputy Attorney General of Delaware M. Jane Brady due to her history as a criminal prosecutor. She launched her campaign on May 16, 1990, and resigned from her position shortly after. She stated that her decision to run was made after she learned of Biden's liberal voting record and felt that it "just does not reflect the views of the people of Delaware". Brady identified herself as a conservative, though noting that she held some socially liberal beliefs.

The state convention of the Libertarian Party of Delaware was held on July 22, 1990. This was the only contested nomination. Lee Rosenbaum, a data communications technician, defeated David S. DeRiemer.

== Issues ==
Biden's early withdrawal from his 1988 presidential campaign was considered an issue for the campaign.

In August 1990, Brady criticized Biden's use of the franking privilege granted to members of Congress, stating that he could have instead used campaign funds. She stated that if elected, she would work to eliminate the privileges.

Throughout the campaign, Brady called for budget reform. Brady stated she opposed raising taxes unless it was accompanied by long-term budgetary reform. She suggested a constitutional amendment to limit tax increases.

In October 1990, The News Journal asked the various candidates what they believed the most pressing issues for the country were. Biden stated that international relations with the then-declining USSR and providing better conditions for children were important in determining the future of the country. Brady stated that her two biggest concerns were fiscal and congressional responsibility, calling for term limits, shorter congressional sessions, and expansion of executive power. Rosenbaum identified the United States's involvement in the Gulf War as the biggest issue, stating that if elected, he would work to limit the United States's involvement in war. He also advocated for looser drug laws.

Biden stated that Congress should focus on improving diplomatic relations with the declining USSR and prioritize nuclear disarmament, while Brady felt that Congress should avoid dealing with foreign relations and instead delegate the job to the Department of Defense.

== Election ==
=== Campaign ===
Speaking with C-SPAN, Biden stated he planned to campaign similarly to how he did in his previous elections, although he noted that he would have less time to campaign due to his role in overseeing David Souter's nomination to the Supreme Court due to his role on the Senate Judiciary Committee. Biden had previously used his position on the committee to reject Ronald Reagan's nomination of Robert Bork to the Supreme Court. Brady criticized this, stating his role in the Bork hearings was evidence of Biden's poor character.

The News Journal wrote that they felt voters in Delaware knew little about Brady. Brady noted that she frequently sent them press releases, and cases she worked on often received news coverage.

Despite Brady being one of few women running for Senate in 1990, Biden was endorsed by various prominent women in the Government of Delaware. Additionally, due to a childcare bill he co-sponsored, Biden received the endorsements of several childcare activists.

On October 2, 1990, she accused Biden of hiring staff from his presidential campaign to work for him in the Senate, labeling it as an "abuse of public trust and a misuse of public funds". Ted Kaufman, Biden's then-chief of staff, stated that this was not unusual for a Senate Committee chairman.

A televised debate between Biden, Brady, and Rosenbaum was held on October 23 by First State News and Heritage Cablevision. A radio debate between them was held on November 2 on WILM. In the debate Biden and Brady argued over line-item vetos. Brady felt that the president should be able to veto specific parts of bills, while Biden felt that it would give the president too much power, allowing them to "take complete control" of Congress.

Brady stated that she hoped to win the election without accepting donations from special interest groups. Ultimately, both Brady and Biden accepted money from interest groups. Brady's campaign raised around $200,000 by October 14 and around $245,000 by election day. She decided against running television commercials and for mailing videotapes instead, as it would be cheaper. The videotapes heavily attacked Biden, leading to them generating controversy. The campaign spent most of its funds, having $4,117 left over after the election. She was heavily outspent by Biden, who raised around 2.8 million dollars, spending around 2.6 million. He ended his campaign with $190,151 left.

=== Results ===
Polls closed at 8 p.m., and the Associated Press called the race for Biden at 8:42 p.m. Around 10:30 p.m., Brady conceded; she partially blamed President George H. W. Bush's role in the passing of the Omnibus Budget Reconciliation Act. Biden, like most incumbents in the 1990 United States Senate elections, was reelected to another term. He won in a landslide, receiving 62.68% of the vote. A slight improvement on his previous margin of victory. Five votes were cast for write-in candidates. The election had a turnout rate of under 40%—slightly higher than that of the concurrent House of Representatives election for Delaware's at-large congressional district.

Both Biden and Rosenbaum performed worse than their Democrat and Libertarian counterparts in the election for the House district. However, Brady outperformed Republican nominee Ralph O'Williams by three percent. With the exception of Tom Carper in the House race, Biden outperformed all other Democratic, Republican, and Libertarian nominees for all of Delaware's at-large elections, including Attorney General, State Treasurer, and Auditor of Accounts. With the exception of O'Williams, Brady underperformed the Republican nominees for all other at-large elections. Rosenbaum was the worst-performing Libertarian nominee.

General election results
| Party | Candidate | Votes | % | ±% |
|---|---|---|---|---|
| Democratic | Joe Biden (incumbent) | 112,918 | 62.68% | +2.57% |
| Republican | M. Jane Brady | 64,554 | 35.83% | −4.06% |
| Libertarian | Lee Rosenbaum | 2,680 | 1.49% | |
| Write-ins | | 5 | 0.00% | |
| Majority | | 48,364 | 26.85% | +6.62% |
| Turnout | | 180,157 | | |
| Democratic hold | | Swing | | |

==== By subdivision ====
Biden won all three counties for the third election in a row. Biden's best performance was in New Castle County, where he won 62 percent of the vote to Brady's 36 percent. Brady's best performance was in Kent County, where she won around 40 percent of the vote to Biden's 58 percent, his lowest share of the vote. Kent County was also Rosenbaum's best performance, where he won slightly under two percent. New Castle County had the highest number of votes cast, with 103 thousand, followed by Sussex County with 86 thousand.

Results by county
| County | Joseph Robinette Biden Jr. Democratic | | M. Jane Brady Republican | | Lee Rosenbaum Libertarian | | Total votes cast | Ref(s) |
| County | # | % | # | % | # | % | Total votes cast | Ref(s) |
|---|---|---|---|---|---|---|---|---|
| Kent | 14,537 | 57.93% | 10,103 | 40.26% | 453 | 1.81% | 25,093 | |
| New Castle | 64,112 | 62.04% | 37,612 | 36.39% | 1,621 | 1.57% | 103,345 | |
| Sussex | 21,276 | 24.51% | 13,302 | 15.33% | 360 | 0.41% | 86,790 | |
| Total | 112,918 | 62.68% | 64,554 | 35.83% | 2,680 | 1.49% | 180,152 | |

Biden won all 41 representative districts; in the concurrent legislative election, 24 Republican candidates won seats. He won all of them by a majority of the vote. Biden's best performance was in District 20, where he received 4,260 votes. Rosenbaum also saw his highest vote total in the district with 106 votes. District 20 was additionally the district where the highest number of votes were cast. Biden's worst performance came in District 34, where he received 1,593 votes to Brady's 1,377. Brady saw her best performance in District 11 with 2,999 votes to Biden's 3,111.

Results by state representative district
| County | Joseph Robinette Biden Jr. Democratic | | M. Jane Brady Republican | | Lee Rosenbaum Libertarian | | Total votes cast | Ref(s) |
| County | # | % | # | % | # | % | Total votes cast | Ref(s) |
|---|---|---|---|---|---|---|---|---|
| District 1 | 3,289 | 78.5% | 829 | 19.79% | 72 | 1.72% | 4,190 | |
| District 2 | 1,904 | 90.75% | 170 | 8.1% | 1,904 | 1.14% | 2,098 | |
| District 3 | 1,604 | 86.38% | 133 | 7.16% | 1,604 | 1.08% | 1,857 | |
| District 4 | 3,204 | 63.51% | 1,762 | 34.93% | 3,204 | 1.57% | 5,045 | |
| District 5 | 2,992 | 80.3% | 643 | 17.26% | 2,992 | 1.37% | 3,726 | |
| District 6 | 2,385 | 60.67% | 1,484 | 37.75% | 2,385 | 1.6% | 3,931 | |
| District 7 | 3,250 | 56.36% | 2,419 | 41.95% | 3,250 | 1.68% | 5,766 | |
| District 8 | 2,817 | 61.82% | 1,669 | 36.62% | 2,817 | 1.56% | 4,557 | |
| District 9 | 2,361 | 66.36% | 1,142 | 32.1% | 2,361 | 1.55% | 3,558 | |
| District 10 | 2,688 | 56.27% | 2,019 | 42.27% | 2,688 | 1.47% | 4,777 | |
| District 11 | 3,111 | 50.2% | 2,999 | 48.39% | 3,111 | 1.4% | 6,197 | |
| District 12 | 3,307 | 52.89% | 2,878 | 46.03% | 3,307 | 1.09% | 6,253 | |
| District 13 | 2,915 | 68.09% | 1,313 | 30.67% | 2,915 | 1.24% | 4,281 | |
| District 14 | 2,758 | 75.79% | 841 | 23.11% | 2,758 | 1.1% | 3,639 | |
| District 15 | 2,488 | 79.34% | 613 | 19.55% | 2,488 | 1.12% | 3,136 | |
| District 16 | 2,551 | 77.07% | 709 | 21.42% | 2,551 | 1.51% | 3,310 | |
| District 17 | 3,343 | 69.28% | 1,393 | 28.87% | 3,343 | 1.84% | 4,825 | |
| District 18 | 2,275 | 66.21% | 1,098 | 31.96% | 2,275 | 1.83% | 3,436 | |
| District 19 | 3,191 | 65.86% | 1,591 | 32.84% | 3,191 | 1.3% | 4,845 | |
| District 20 | 4,260 | 58.86% | 2,872 | 39.68% | 4,260 | 1.46% | 7,238 | |
| District 21 | 2,834 | 60.48% | 1,775 | 37.88% | 2,834 | 1.64% | 4,686 | |
| District 22 | 3,165 | 54.35% | 2,568 | 44.1% | 3,165 | 1.55% | 5,823 | |
| District 23 | 2,380 | 59.8% | 1,517 | 38.12% | 2,380 | 2.09% | 3,980 | |
| District 24 | 2,215 | 61.34% | 1,323 | 36.64% | 2,215 | 2.02% | 3,611 | |
| District 25 | 1,756 | 59.81% | 1,113 | 37.91% | 1,756 | 2.28% | 2,936 | |
| District 26 | 2,884 | 65.97% | 1,401 | 32.04% | 2,884 | 1.99% | 4,372 | |
| District 27 | 3,797 | 61.7% | 2,263 | 36.77% | 3,797 | 1.53% | 6,154 | |
| District 28 | 2,694 | 68.81% | 1,150 | 29.37% | 2,694 | 1.81% | 3,915 | |
| District 29 | 2,302 | 59.84% | 1,460 | 37.95% | 2,302 | 2.21% | 3,847 | |
| District 30 | 2,194 | 59.65% | 1,408 | 38.28% | 2,194 | 2.07% | 3,678 | |
| District 31 | 2,562 | 63.54% | 1,812 | 44.94% | 2,562 | 1.39% | 4,032 | |
| District 32 | 1,765 | 44.56% | 1,414 | 35.7% | 1,765 | 1.59% | 3,961 | |
| District 33 | 2,175 | 71.85% | 1,717 | 56.72% | 2,175 | 2.28% | 3,027 | |
| District 34 | 1,593 | 47.14% | 1,377 | 40.75% | 1,593 | 1.69% | 3,379 | |
| District 35 | 2,209 | 59.96% | 1,480 | 40.17% | 2,209 | 1.82% | 3,684 | |
| District 36 | 2,847 | 61.56% | 1,734 | 37.49% | 2,847 | 0.97% | 4,625 | |
| District 37 | 3,891 | 57.94% | 2,742 | 40.83% | 3,891 | 1.24% | 6,716 | |
| District 38 | 4,030 | 59.2% | 2,713 | 39.85% | 4,030 | 0.95% | 6,808 | |
| District 39 | 2,571 | 58.09% | 1,823 | 41.19% | 2,571 | 0.72% | 4,426 | |
| District 40 | 3,035 | 66.57% | 1,490 | 32.68% | 3,035 | 0.75% | 4,559 | |
| District 41 | 3,326 | 65.56% | 1,697 | 33.45% | 3,326 | 0.99% | 5,073 | |
| Total | 112,918 | 62.68% | 64,554 | 35.83% | 2,680 | 1.49% | 180,152 | |

== Aftermath ==
On January 3, 1991, Biden was sworn in to the 102nd United States Congress by then–Vice President Dan Quayle alongside his fellow Senator-elects. During the following election cycle, Senate minority leader Bob Dole criticized the lack of media coverage that Brady, along with other female Republican candidates, received. During the 2024 presidential election, Brady spoke about Biden, stating, "I don't think he ever broke a sweat once he was an incumbent".

== Bibliography ==
- Wrightson, Lewis C. (December 20, 1978). State of Delaware: Official Results of General Election 1978 (PDF). Delaware Department of Elections.
- Dennis, Virginia M. (January 16, 1985). State of Delaware: Official Results of General Election 1984 (PDF). Delaware Department of Elections.
- Harper, Richard B. (March 27, 1991). State of Delaware: Official Results of General Election 1990 (PDF). Delaware Department of Elections.
