= 2018 Delaware Attorney General election =

- November 6, 2018
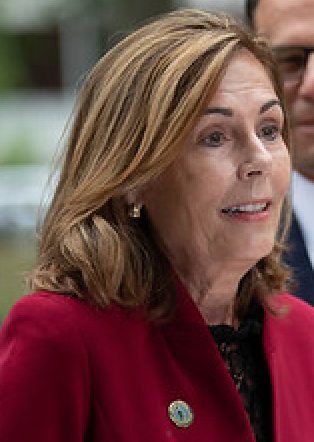

Nominee	Kathy Jennings	Bernard Pepukayi
Party	Democratic	Republican
Popular vote	218,351	137,730
Percentage	61.31%	38.68%
- Jennings: 50–60% 60–70% 70–80% 80–90% >90% Pepukayi: 50–60% 60–70% 70–80% Tie: 50% No data
Attorney General before election
Matthew Denn
Democratic
Elected Attorney General
Kathy Jennings
Democratic

The 2018 Delaware Attorney General election took place on November 6, 2018. The Delaware primary election for federal and state candidates took place on September 6, 2018. Incumbent Attorney General Matthew Denn announced on August 28, 2017 that he would not seek re-election.

== Democratic primary ==
=== Candidates ===
==== Nominee ====
- Kathy Jennings, former New Castle County chief administrative officer

==== Eliminated in primary ====
- Chris Johnson, former counsel for the City of Wilmington Law Department
- Tim Mullaney, former chief of staff for the Delaware Department of Justice
- LaKresha Roberts, former Delaware chief deputy attorney general

==== Declined ====
- Matthew Denn, incumbent state attorney general

=== Endorsements ===
Chris Johnson

State legislators

- Sean Lynn, state representative

City councilpersons

- Kevin Kelley, former Wilmington councilman
- Jen Wallace, Newark councilwoman

Individuals

- Sylvester Johnson, former Philadelphia Police commissioner
- Coby Owens, social justice activist, CEO of Youth Caucus of America, and 2016 delegate for Bernie Sanders

Organizations

- Blue Wave Crowd Source
- The Broader Representation Advocacy Team
- Delaware United
- Moms Demand Action
- The Political Revolution
- Progressive Democrats for Delaware
- Real Justice
- Working Families Party
Kathy Jennings

Organizations

- Delaware State Education Association
LaKresha Roberts

Organizations

- Eastern Sussex Democratic Club

=== Results ===
Results by county Map legend: Jennings—60–70%; Jennings—50–60%

Democratic primary results
Party	Candidate	Votes	%
Democratic	Kathy Jennings	46,038	56.6
Democratic	LaKresha Roberts	17,584	21.6
Democratic	Chris Johnson	12,194	15.0
Democratic	Tim Mullaney	5,513	6.8
Margin of victory		28,454	35.0%
Turnout		81,329	25.4%
Total votes		81,329	100.0

== Republican primary ==
=== Candidates ===
==== Nominee ====
- Bernard Pepukayi, former New Castle County attorney

==== Withdrawn nomination ====
- Peggy Marshall Thomas, former chief Sussex County prosecutor

==== Withdrew ====
- Tom Neuberger, lawyer

== Independents ==
=== Candidates ===
==== Declared ====
- Allen Jester (write-in)

== General election ==
=== Predictions ===
Source	Ranking	As of
Governing	Likely D	October 26, 2018

=== Endorsements ===
Kathy Jennings (D)

Vice presidents

- Joe Biden, 47th vice president of the United States

Senators

- Tom Carper, U.S. senator from Delaware
- Chris Coons, U.S. senator from Delaware

US representatives

- Lisa Blunt Rochester, U.S. representative from Delaware

Governors

- John Carney, 74th governor of Delaware

State legislators

- James Johnson, state representative

Political candidates

- Krista Griffith, Democratic nominee for Delaware’s 12th House district

Organizations

- Delaware State Education Association
- Democratic Attorneys General Association
- Democratic Party
- EMILY's List
- LiUNA Eastern Region
- Mary Ann’s List
- Planned Parenthood
Bernard Pepukayi (R)

Political candidates

- Scott Walker, Republican nominee for U.S. House in Delaware in 2018
Declined to endorse

Declined to endorse Bernard Pepukayi

- Peter Kopf, former New Castle County Republican chairman

=== Results ===
Delaware Attorney General election, 2018
Party	Candidate	Votes	%
Democratic	Kathy Jennings	218,351	61.31%
Republican	Bernard Pepukayi	137,730	38.68%
Total votes		356,081	100.0%
Democratic hold			
