= 2022 Delaware Attorney General election =

- November 8, 2022
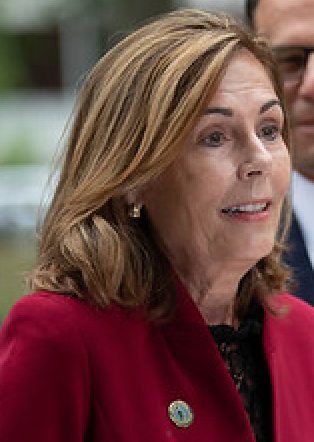

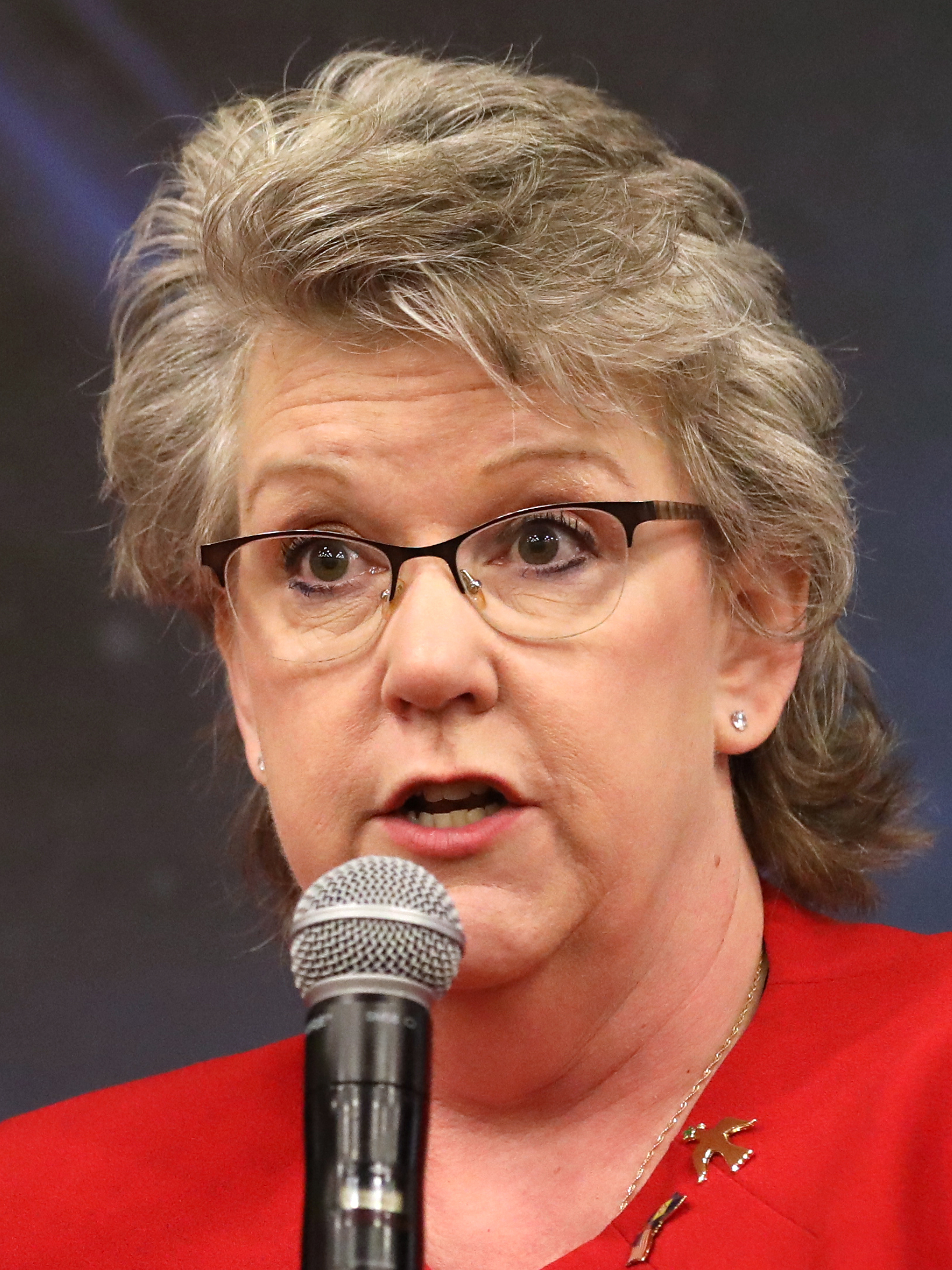
Nominee	Kathy Jennings	Julianne Murray
Party	Democratic	Republican
Popular vote	171,837	147,369
Percentage	53.83%	46.17%
- Jennings: 50–60% 60–70% 70–80% 80–90% >90% Murray: 50–60% 60–70% 70–80% 80–90% No data
Attorney General before election
Kathy Jennings
Democratic
Elected Attorney General
Kathy Jennings
Democratic

The 2022 Delaware Attorney General election took place on November 8, 2022, to elect the Attorney General of Delaware. Incumbent Democratic Attorney General Kathy Jennings won re-election to a second term. However, turnout was very low and the race was closer than anticipated, with Murray's 46.17% being the Republicans' best result in this race since 2006.

== Democratic primary ==
=== Candidates ===
==== Nominee ====
- Kathy Jennings, incumbent attorney general

== Republican primary ==
=== Candidates ===
==== Nominee ====
- Julianne Murray, attorney and nominee for Governor of Delaware in 2020

==== Failed to file ====
- Charles Welch, former Kent County judge

== General election ==
=== Polling ===
Poll source	Date(s) administered	Sample size (Note: Key: A – all adults RV – registered voters LV – likely voters V – unclear)	Margin of error	Kathy Jennings (D)	Julianne Murray (R)	Undecided
University of Delaware	September 14–29, 2022	904 (RV)	± 3.3%	53%	40%	8%

=== Predictions ===
Source	Ranking	As of
Sabato's Crystal Ball	Safe D	September 14, 2022
Elections Daily	Safe D	November 1, 2022

=== Results ===
2022 Delaware Attorney General election
Party	Candidate	Votes	%	±%
Democratic	Kathleen Jennings (incumbent)	171,837	53.83%	−7.48%
Republican	Julianne E. Murray	147,369	46.17%	+7.49%
Total votes		319,206	100.0%	
Democratic hold				

County	Kathy Jennings Democratic		Julianne Murray Republican	
County	#	%	#	%
New Castle	106,999	63.75%	60,839	36.25%
Kent	24,769	46.07%	29,000	53.93%
Sussex	40,069	41.05%	57,530	58.95%
Totals	171,837	53.83%	147,369	46.17%

Counties that flipped from Democratic to Republican

- Kent (largest city: Dover)

== See also ==
- Delaware Attorney General
