= Attorney General Alliance =

American nonprofit group

- Successor: Conference of Western Attorneys General
- Formation: 1982; 44 years ago
- Headquarters: Washington, D.C.
- Region served: United States
- Chairman: Raul Torrez (D)
- Website: www.agalliance.org

The Attorney General Alliance (AGA) is a nonprofit group of state attorneys general in the United States. The AGA was founded in 1982 as a bipartisan group of state attorneys general. The group's current interim chairman is Democrat Raul Torrez, who is the New Mexico Attorney General. The majority of the AGA's funding comes from corporate sponsorships, including from companies that state attorneys general are tasked with investigating. The group has faced criticism for its fundraising practices, including "courting sponsorships for lavish conferences and foreign junkets from a stable of lobbyists and corporate patrons."

== History and overview ==
The group was founded in 1982 as the Conference of Western Attorneys General (CWAG), a bipartisan group of 15 western states and three territories. As of November 2025, the group's interim chairman was Raul Torrez, a Democrat who is the New Mexico Attorney General. He was preceded by Aaron Ford, a Democratic Attorney General of Nevada. The AGA's policy issues and initiatives include cannabis regulation, sports betting, cybercrime, and social justice and equity.

== Corporate sponsors and fundraising practices ==
The majority of the AGA's revenue comes from corporate sponsorships. Some of those corporate sponsors are companies that state attorneys general are tasked with investigating. Attendance at AGA meetings requires a minimum donation of $10,000 to the group. Sponsors of the AGA's 2022 annual meeting included Meta Platforms, Amazon, TikTok, Target Corporation, and the Center for Secure and Modern Elections, a project of the left-leaning Arabella Advisors network. Major sponsors of AGA's 2019 conference included Juul, AWL Inc., Quicken Loans, Pfizer, Comcast, and AT&T, companies which at the time were all facing class action lawsuits brought by state attorneys general. Major U.S. plaintiffs' law firms have also sponsored AGA events.

The AGA has drawn criticism for "courting sponsorships for lavish conferences and foreign junkets from a stable of lobbyists and corporate patrons," according to Axios. In a June 2022 resignation letter, Chris Toth, the former executive director of competitor group the National Association of Attorneys General, alleged that the AGA was selling access to lobbyists and corporate patrons. Toth wrote that he was "increasingly alarmed at the growing influence of lobbyist and corporate money in the attorney general arena, particularly involving entities that are being investigated and/or sued by AGs." Toth sent his resignation letter to all state attorneys general and chief deputies. He alleged that the AGA was "a vessel for lobbying and a threat to the ethics of state attorneys general."

The AGA sponsors junkets to foreign countries including Qatar and Morocco. It is "known to wine and dine state officials and their staffers."

In October 2022, CBS News Colorado reported that Colorado Attorney General Phil Weiser had been among a group of U.S. attorneys general "attending lavish events funded, in part, by companies they're suing and investigating." CBS reported on Weiser's attendance at a 2021 event at the Grand Wailea Resort in Maui that was funded by taxpayers and corporate sponsors, including companies such as Google, Facebook, Juul, and Pfizer which were being actively sued by state attorneys general at the time.

In July 2023, Fox News reported that Ken Paxton, the embattled and currently suspended Texas Attorney General, had attended a 10-day AGA trip in China in 2019 against the advice of his staff, "who expressed worry over potential Chinese Communist Party influence." Fox News described the trip as "shadowy" and "lavish", reporting that Paxton had met with Chinese government officials and private sector representatives.

In April 2025, it was reported that Kathy Jennings, Delaware's Democratic Attorney General, has participated in AGA junkets during her tenure as Attorney General. In addition to several events around the United States, she and her husband traveled to South Africa in November 2023 for an event paid for by the AGA. While Jennings has stated that no taxpayer money paid for her flights, Jenning's $6,500 annual membership in the AGA is funded by Delaware taxpayers.

In October 2025, it was reported that Democrat Aaron Ford, Nevada's Attorney General and former AGA chairman, has taken multiple trips around the world paid for by the AGA. The trips began in 2017 while he was Majority Leader of the Nevada Senate. Through information required by elected officials in the state about such trips, it was reported that Ford visited South Africa, Poland, Israel and South Korea in 2023; Spain in 2022; Qatar in 2021; Ghana in 2020; Israel in 2019; and eight cities in the United States. The trips were valued at over $140,000.

== See also ==
- National Association of Attorneys General
