= Jacob Moore =

American politician (1829–1886)

Jacob Moore (November 21, 1829 – December 13, 1886) was Attorney General of the state of Delaware from 1864 through 1869.

Born in Laurel, Delaware, Moore was the oldest of twelve children of Lowther Taylor Moore, a storekeeper. After taking a preparatory course, Moore entered Union College in Schenectady, New York, in 1846, and graduated after a full course in 1850. The following three years he spent at Georgetown, Delaware, in the office of the Hon. Edward Wootten of the Superior Court of Delaware, and in 1853 Moore opened a law office in Georgetown. Moore was initially a Democrat, having cast his first vote for President Franklin Pierce in 1852, but switched to the Republican Party after the Battle of Fort Sumter in 1861, and was thereafter a vocal organizer and advocate of the party.

On September 3, 1863, Moore was appointed attorney-general of the state by the Governor William Cannon, the only political office that Moore held in his life. Upon Moore's retirement, Chief Justice Edward Gilpin said: "He has made a good officer and has tried more important capital cases than any other attorney general in the state; and during his term of office the law of murder has been firmly settled". After his term as attorney general, Moore returned to his practice, giving much of his time to the affairs of the Junction and Breakwater and the Breakwater and Frankford Railroad Companies and the Old Dominion Steamship Company, whose local counsel he was. He frequently appeared before the United States District Courts in Delaware and Philadelphia, and before the Supreme Court of the United States.

Moore died at his home at Georgetown after a short sickness. His trouble was of a gastric nature and he had only been ill a few hours. He had frequently been troubled with this ailment and he had apprehended for years that some time, sooner or later, it would result fatally, but his death was wholly unexpected, as he had enjoyed excellent health up to that evening.

Legal offices
Preceded by Alfred Wooten	Attorney General of Delaware; 1864–1869	Succeeded by Charles B. Lore
