= Charles B. Lore =

American judge

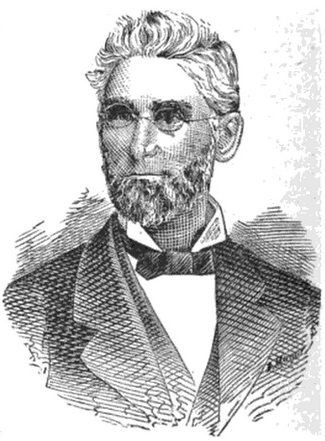
- From 1880's Industries of Delaware: Historical and Descriptive Review

Member of the U.S. House of Representatives from Delaware's at-large district
- In office March 4, 1883 – March 3, 1887
- Preceded by: Edward L. Martin
- Succeeded by: John B. Penington

Attorney General of Delaware
- In office 1869–1874
- Governor: Gove Saulsbury; James Ponder
- Preceded by: Jacob Moore
- Succeeded by: John B. Penington

Personal details
- Born: March 16, 1831 Cantwell's Bridge, Delaware, U.S.
- Died: March 6, 1911 (aged 79) Wilmington, Delaware, U.S.
- Party: Democratic
- Education: Dickinson College
- Profession: Lawyer

Charles Brown Lore (March 16, 1831 – March 6, 1911) was an American lawyer and politician from Wilmington, in New Castle County, Delaware. He was a member of the Democratic Party, and served as Attorney General of Delaware and U.S. Representative from Delaware.

== Early life and family ==
Lore was born in Cantwell's Bridge (now Odessa), Delaware, on March 16, 1831. He attended the public schools and Middletown Academy in Middletown, Delaware. He graduated from Dickinson College in Carlisle, Pennsylvania, in June 1852, then studied law and was admitted to the Delaware Bar in New Castle County in 1861.

== Professional and political career ==
He was clerk of the Delaware House of Representatives in 1857 and during the Civil War served as commissioner of the federal army's draft for New Castle County in 1862.

Lore served as Attorney General of Delaware from 1869 to 1874 and was elected as a Democrat to the 48th and 49th U.S. Congress, serving from March 4, 1883, to March 3, 1887. He was not a candidate for renomination, and was appointed Chief Justice of the Delaware Supreme Court in 1893. He was reappointed in 1897 for a term of twelve years but retired in 1909. He was also a member of the code commission in 1909 and 1910.

He also served as the inaugural president of the Board of Trustees of then-Delaware College for Colored Students outside of Dover (legislatively renamed in 1893 as the State College for Colored, and which is currently Delaware State University). He would serve board president from the College's beginning in 1891 until about 1909.

== Death and legacy ==
Lore died at his home in Wilmington on March 6, 1911. His remains were cremated and the ashes were deposited there in the Methodist Church Cemetery.

The Charles B. Lore Elementary School at Wilmington was added to the National Register of Historic Places in 1983.

== Almanac ==
Elections are held the first Tuesday after November 1. U.S. Representatives took office March 4 and have a two-year term.

Public Offices
Office	Type	Location	Began office	Ended office	notes
Attorney General	Executive	Dover	1869	1874	Delaware
U.S. Representative	Legislature	Washington	March 4, 1883	March 3, 1885	
U.S. Representative	Legislature	Washington	March 4, 1885	March 3, 1887	
Chief Justice	Judiciary	Dover	1893	1909	Delaware Supreme Court

United States Congressional service
Dates	Congress	Chamber	Majority	President	Committees	Class/District
1883–1885	48th	U.S. House	Democratic	Chester A. Arthur		at-large
1885–1887	49th	U.S. House	Democratic	Grover Cleveland		at-large

Election results
Year	Office	Subject	Party	Votes	%	Opponent	Party	Votes	%
1882	U.S. Representative	Charles B. Lore	Democratic	16,563	53%	Washington Hastings	Republican	14,640	47%
1884	U.S. Representative	Charles B. Lore	Democratic	17,054	57%	Anthony Higgins	Republican	12,878	43%

== Places with more information ==
- Delaware Historical Society; website; 505 North Market Street, Wilmington, Delaware 19801; (302) 655-7161.
- University of Delaware; Library website; 181 South College Avenue, Newark, Delaware 19717; (302) 831-2965.

U.S. House of Representatives
Preceded by Edward L. Martin	Member of the U.S. House of Representatives from Delaware's at-large congressional district 1883–1887	Succeeded by John B. Penington
