= M. Jane Brady =

Former Attorney General of Delaware, Chair of the Delaware Republican Party

Jane Brady

Chair of the Delaware Republican Party
- In office May 4, 2019 – May 3, 2023
- Preceded by: Mike Harrington
- Succeeded by: Julianne Murray

Attorney General of Delaware
- In office January 3, 1995 – December 7, 2005
- Governor: Tom Carper; Ruth Ann Minner
- Preceded by: Charles Oberly
- Succeeded by: Carl Danberg

Personal details
- Born: January 11, 1951 (age 75) Wilmington, Delaware, U.S.
- Party: Republican
- Education: University of Delaware (BA); Villanova University (JD)

M. Jane Brady (born January 11, 1951) is an American attorney and former judge. She was the Attorney General of Delaware from 1995 to 2005, the first woman to serve in that position. From 2005 to 2017, she served as a judge on the Delaware Superior Court.

== Education ==
Brady earned her undergraduate degree from University of Delaware and a JD degree from Villanova University School of Law.

== Career ==
Brady became an attorney in 1977. She then proceeded to serve as a prosecutor for twelve years, followed by four years of private law practice, and an unsuccessful attempt to be elected to the United States Senate seat then held by future president Joe Biden. In 1994 she was elected Delaware's first female attorney general, as a Republican. She was re-elected in 1998 and 2002.

She resigned as attorney general in December 2005, and became a judge on the Delaware Superior Court.

Brady is a supporter of Donald Trump, defeated by Biden in the 2020 presidential election. In the aftermath of the storming of the Capitol by a mob of Trump supporters, Brady claimed that Trump bore no responsibility for the riot and opposed efforts to remove him from office. Brady has also claimed that election "irregularities" occurred in the 2020 election due to mail-in voting.

In 2019, Brady became the chair of the Delaware Republican Party. She stepped down as chairwoman in 2023 and joined as co-chair of A Better Delaware on May 3, 2023.

== Personal life ==
Brady is married to Michael Neal and has an adopted son, Trent.

== Awards ==
- Alumni Wall of Fame, University of Delaware (1996)

== See also ==
- List of female state attorneys general in the United States

Party political offices
Preceded by John Burris	Republican nominee for U.S. Senator from Delaware (Class 2); 1990	Succeeded by Raymond Clatworthy
Preceded by Mike Harrington	Chair of the Delaware Republican Party; 2019–2023	Succeeded by Julianne Murray
Legal offices
Preceded by Charles Oberly	Attorney General of Delaware; 1995–2005	Succeeded by Carl Danberg
