= John B. Penington =

American politician

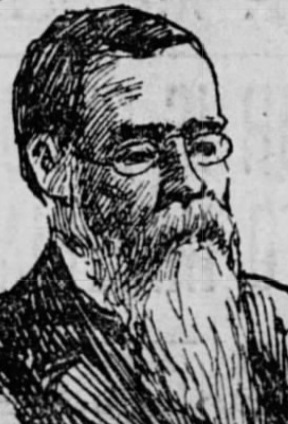
- The San Francisco Call (December 13, 1898)

Member of the U.S. House of Representatives from Delaware's at-large district
- In office March 4, 1887 – March 3, 1891
- Preceded by: Charles B. Lore
- Succeeded by: John W. Causey

Attorney General of Delaware
- In office 1874–1879
- Governor: James Ponder; John P. Cochran
- Preceded by: Charles B. Lore
- Succeeded by: George Gray

Personal details
- Born: December 20, 1825 New Castle, Delaware, U.S.
- Died: June 1, 1902 (aged 76) Dover, Delaware, U.S.
- Party: Democratic
- Education: Jefferson College
- Profession: Lawyer

John Brown Penington (December 20, 1825 – June 1, 1902) was an American lawyer and politician, from Dover, in Kent County, Delaware. He was a member of the Democratic Party who served as Attorney General of Delaware and two terms as U. S. Representative from Delaware.

== Early life and family ==
Penington was born near New Castle, Delaware, and pursued academic courses in New Castle and nearby Newark. He graduated from Jefferson College at Canonsburg, Pennsylvania. He engaged in teaching in Indiana for several years, but then returned to Delaware. There he studied law, was admitted to the Delaware Bar in 1857, and commenced the practice in Dover, Delaware.

== Professional and political career ==
He was elected to the Delaware House of Representatives in 1857 and later served as its clerk in 1859, 1863, and 1871. He was a delegate to the renowned Democratic National Conventions at Charleston and Baltimore in the 1860 election. In 1868, he was appointed United States Attorney for the district of Delaware by President Andrew Johnson and served until 1872. He was appointed Delaware Attorney General by Governor Ponder in 1874 and served until 1879. Penington was elected as a Democrat to the 50th and 51st Congress, serving from March 4, 1887, to March 3, 1891. He was not a candidate for renomination in 1890 and resumed the practice of law at Dover.

== Death and legacy ==
Penington died at Dover and is buried there in the Old Presbyterian Cemetery, on the grounds of the Delaware State Museum.

Penington's last years were darkened by the murders of his daughters Elizabeth and Ida, by poisoned candy. It was sent to their home from San Francisco, California, by Cordelia Botkin (an ex-lover of Elizabeth's husband, John Preston Dunning). The poison was traced back to her, and Penington lived long enough to learn that the perpetrator would be held accountable.

== Almanac ==
Elections are held the first Tuesday after November 1. U.S. Representatives took office March 4 and have a two-year term.

Public Offices
Office	Type	Location	Began office	Ended office	notes
Attorney General	Executive	Dover	1874	1879	Delaware
U.S. Representative	Legislature	Washington	March 4, 1887	March 3, 1889	
U.S. Representative	Legislature	Washington	March 4, 1889	March 3, 1891	

Delaware General Assembly service
Dates	Assembly	Chamber	Majority	Governor	Committees	District
1857/58	69th	State House	Democratic	Peter F. Causey		Kent at-large

United States Congressional service
Dates	Congress	Chamber	Majority	President	Committees	Class/District
1887–1889	50th	U.S. House	Democratic	Grover Cleveland		at-large
1889–1891	51st	U.S. House	Republican	Benjamin Harrison		at-large

Election results
Year	Office	Subject	Party	Votes	%	Opponent	Party	Votes	%
1886	U.S. Representative	John B. Penington	Democratic	13,837	62%	Richard W. Cooper	Republican	8,392	38%
1888	U.S. Representative	John B. Penington	Democratic	16,396	55%	Charles H. Treat	Republican	12,935	44%

== Places with more information ==
- Delaware Historical Society; website; 505 North Market Street, Wilmington, Delaware 19801; (302) 655-7161.
- University of Delaware; Library website; 181 South College Avenue, Newark, Delaware 19717; (302) 831-2965.

U.S. House of Representatives
Preceded by Charles B. Lore	Member of the U.S. House of Representatives from Delaware's at-large congressional district 1887–1891	Succeeded by John W. Causey
