= Julianne Murray =

American politician (born 1970)

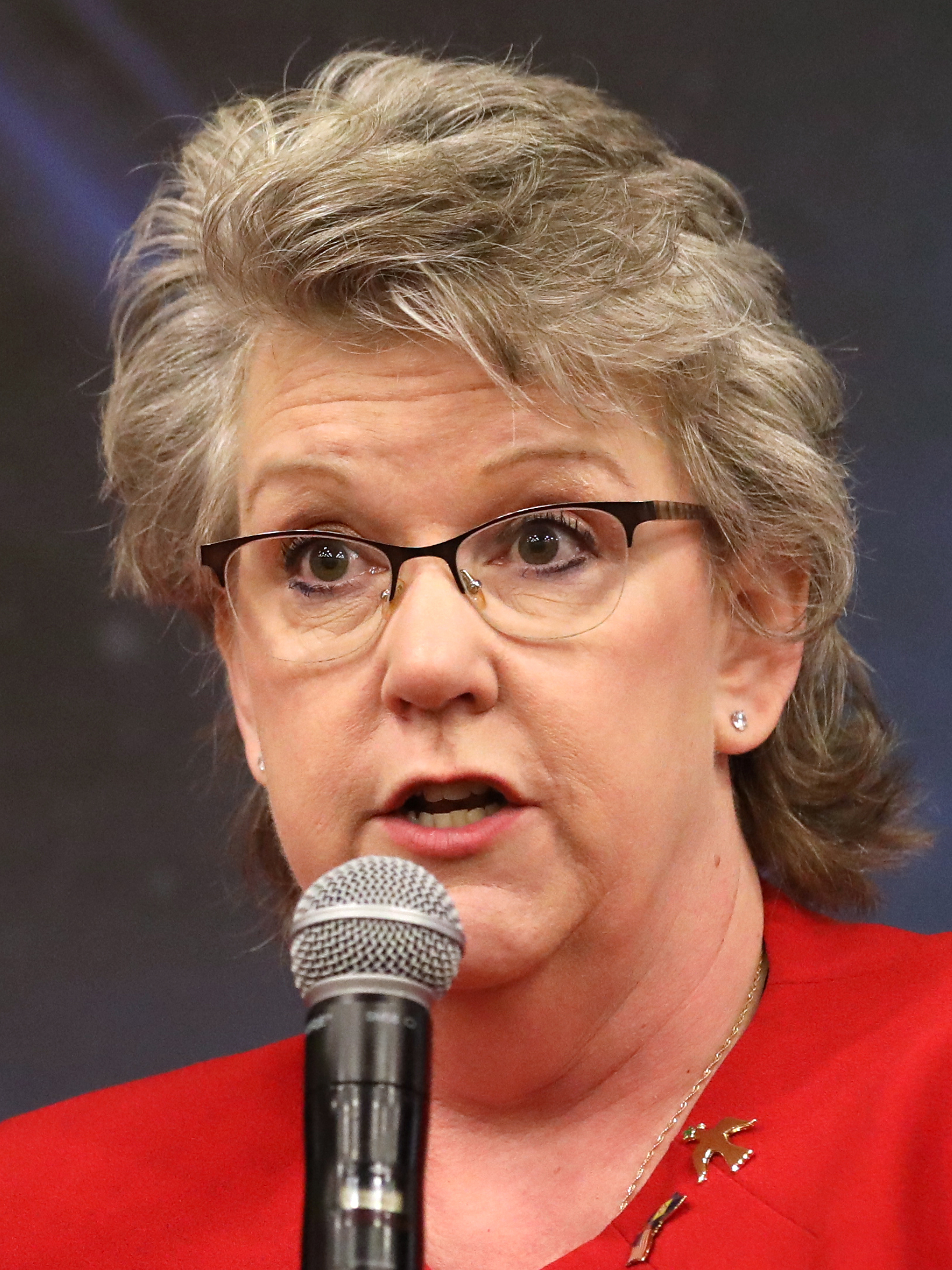

United States Attorney for the District of Delaware
- Acting
- In office July 14, 2025 – December 12, 2025
- President: Donald Trump
- Preceded by: David C. Weiss
- Succeeded by: Benjamin Wallace

Chair of the Delaware Republican Party
- In office April 29, 2023 – July 22, 2025
- Preceded by: M. Jane Brady
- Succeeded by: Jim Weldin (acting)

Personal details
- Born: March 1970 (age 56) Alexandria, Virginia, U.S.
- Party: Republican
- Education: University of Arizona (BS); Widener University (JD)

Julianne E. Murray (born March 1970) is an American attorney from Delaware. She was elected Chairwoman of the Delaware Republican Party in 2023 and resigned in 2025. She served as Acting United States Attorney for the District of Delaware from July to December 2025. In 2020, Murray won the Republican nomination for governor, losing to incumbent John Carney in the general election. She was also the Republican nominee for attorney general in 2022, narrowly losing the general election. In 2026, Delaware Republican Party delegates attempted to draft her at its annual convention to run for State Attorney General, giving her their nomination, but she declined.

== Electoral history ==
=== 2020 ===
Delaware gubernatorial election, 2020
Party	Candidate	Votes	%	±%
Democratic	John Carney (incumbent)	292,903	59.46%	+1.12%
Republican	Julianne Murray	190,312	38.63%	−0.55%
Independent Party	Kathy DeMatteis	6,150	1.25%	N/A
Libertarian	John Machurek	3,270	0.66%	−0.43%
Total votes		492,635	100.00%	N/A

=== 2022 ===
2022 Delaware Attorney General election
Party	Candidate	Votes	%	±%
Democratic	Kathleen Jennings (incumbent)	171,837	53.83%	−7.48%
Republican	Julianne E. Murray	147,369	46.17%	+7.49%
Total votes		319,206	100.0%	

Party political offices
Preceded by M. Jane Brady	Chair of the Delaware Republican Party; 2023–2025	Succeeded by Jim Weldin; Acting
