= 2024 United States Senate election in Delaware =

- November 5, 2024
- Turnout: 65.74%
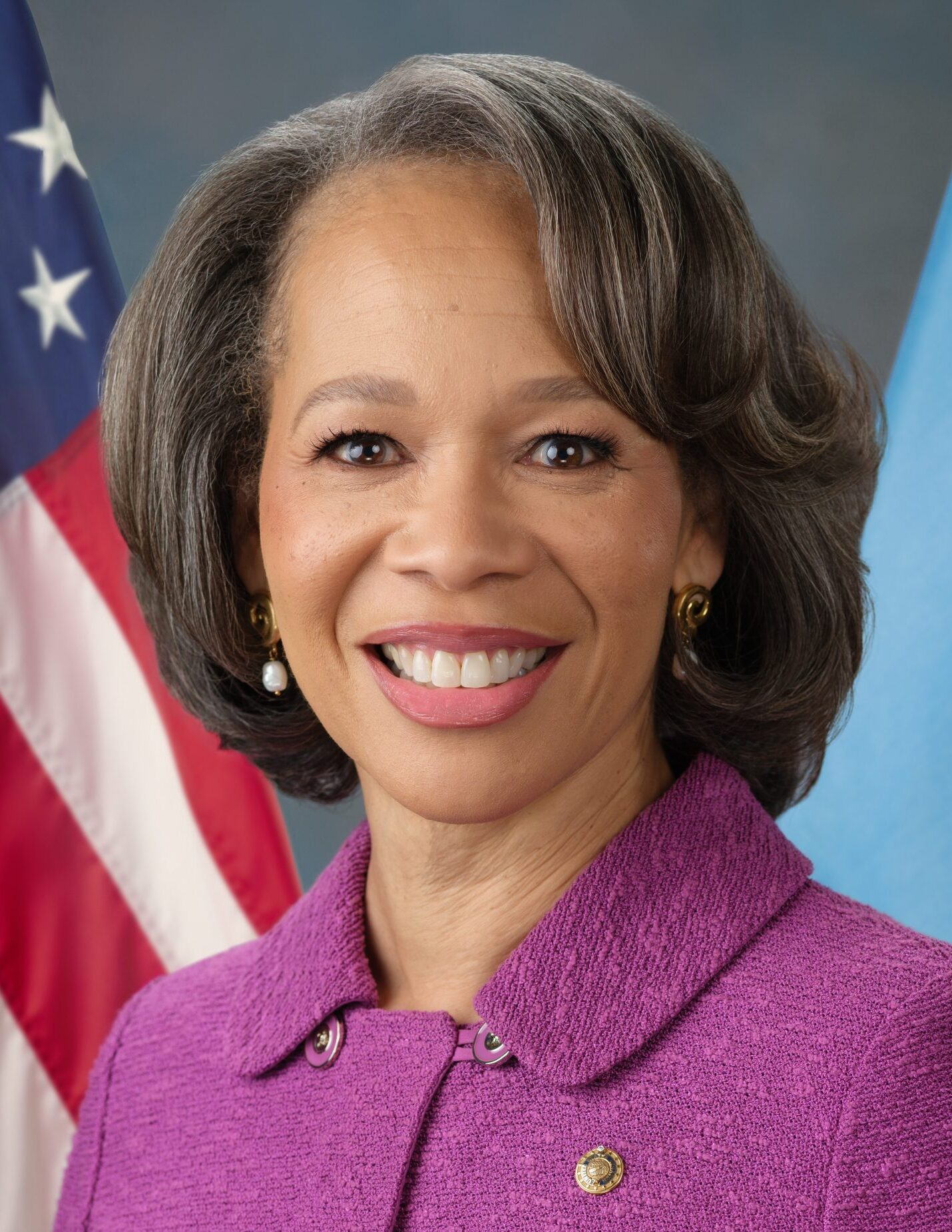

Nominee	Lisa Blunt Rochester	Eric Hansen
Party	Democratic	Republican
Popular vote	283,298	197,753
Percentage	56.59%	39.50%
- Blunt Rochester: 40–50% 50–60% 60–70% 70–80% 80–90% >90% Hansen: 40–50% 50–60% 60–70% 70–80% 80–90% Tie: 40–50% No votes
U.S. senator before election
Tom Carper
Democratic
Elected U.S. Senator
Lisa Blunt Rochester
Democratic

The 2024 United States Senate election in Delaware was held on November 5, 2024, to elect a member of the United States Senate to represent the state of Delaware. Democratic congresswoman Lisa Blunt Rochester won her first term in office, defeating Republican businessman Eric Hansen. She succeeded Democratic incumbent Tom Carper, who declined to seek a fifth term.

This was the first open race for this seat since 1970. Republicans have not won a Senate race in Delaware since 1994. Blunt Rochester is both the first woman and first African American to represent Delaware in the Senate, as she did previously in the House. With Blunt Rochester's win and Angela Alsobrooks winning an open seat in Maryland, this is the first time in history that two African American women serve in the Senate at the same time.

== Democratic primary ==
=== Candidates ===
==== Nominee ====
- Lisa Blunt Rochester, U.S. representative from Delaware's at-large congressional district

==== Declined ====
- John Carney, governor of Delaware (2017–2025) and former U.S. representative from Delaware's at-large congressional district (2011–2017) (ran for Mayor of Wilmington)
- Tom Carper, incumbent U.S. senator (endorsed Blunt Rochester)
- Colleen Davis, Delaware State Treasurer (ran for U.S. House)
- Kerri Evelyn Harris, state representative and candidate for U.S. Senate in 2018

=== Endorsements ===
Lisa Blunt Rochester

U.S. senators

- Laphonza Butler, California (2023–2024)
- Tom Carper, Delaware (2001–2025)
- Carol Moseley Braun, Illinois (1993–1999)
- Chuck Schumer, Senate Majority Leader (2021–2025) from New York (1999–present)

U.S. representatives

- Barbara Lee, CA-12 (1998–2025)

Statewide officials

- Gretchen Whitmer, governor of Michigan (2019–present)

County officials

- Angela Alsobrooks, county executive of Prince George's County, Maryland (2018–2024)

Individuals

- Mark Hamill, actor

Organizations

- Black Economic Alliance PAC
- Council for a Livable World
- EMILY's List
- End Citizens United
- Feminist Majority PAC
- Giffords
- Human Rights Campaign
- J Street PAC
- League of Conservation Voters
- National Women's Political Caucus
- Planned Parenthood Action Fund
- Population Connection Action Fund
- Reproductive Freedom for All

Labor unions

- National Education Association

=== Fundraising ===
Campaign finance reports as of June 30, 2024
Candidate	Raised	Spent	Cash on hand
Lisa Blunt Rochester (D)	$6,971,101	$3,850,139	$3,120,961
Source: Federal Election Commission

=== Polling ===
Hypothetical polling

Poll source	Date(s) administered	Sample size (Note: Key: A – all adults RV – registered voters LV – likely voters V – unclear)	Margin of error	Lisa Blunt Rochester	John Carney	Others	Undecided
Slingshot Strategies (Note: The poll was commissioned by Citizens for Judicial Fairness.)	October 7–14, 2023	600 (RV)	± 3.9%	43%	33%	9%	15%

== Republican primary ==
=== Candidates ===
==== Nominee ====
- Eric Hansen, businessman

=== Fundraising ===
Campaign finance reports as of June 30, 2024
Candidate	Raised	Spent	Cash on hand
Eric Hansen (R)	$940,060 (Note: $810,000 of this total was self-funded by Hansen)	$571,263	$368,797
Source: Federal Election Commission

== Independent Party of Delaware ==
=== Candidates ===
==== Nominee ====
- Michael Katz, former Democratic state senator (2009–2013)

=== Fundraising ===
Campaign finance reports as of June 30, 2024
Candidate	Raised	Spent	Cash on hand
Michael Katz (IPoD)	$3,500	$2,613	$216
Source: Federal Election Commission

== General election ==
=== Predictions ===
Source	Ranking	As of
The Cook Political Report	Solid D	November 9, 2023
Elections Daily	Safe D	November 9, 2023
Inside Elections	Solid D	November 9, 2023
Sabato's Crystal Ball	Safe D	January 24, 2023
Decision Desk HQ/The Hill	Safe D	June 8, 2024
CNalysis	Solid D	November 21, 2023
RealClearPolitics	Solid D	August 5, 2024
Split Ticket	Safe D	October 23, 2024
538	Solid D	October 23, 2024

=== Polling ===
Poll source	Date(s) administered	Sample size	Margin of error	Lisa Blunt Rochester (D)	Eric Hansen (R)	Michael Katz (I)	Undecided
University of Delaware	September 11–19, 2024	400 (RV)	± 5.8%	52%	32%	6%	10%

=== Results ===
Results by state house district

United States Senate election in Delaware, 2024
Party	Candidate	Votes	%	±%
Democratic	Lisa Blunt Rochester	283,298	56.59%	−3.36%
Republican	Eric Hansen	197,753	39.50%	+1.69%
Independent Party	Michael Katz	19,555	3.91%	N/A
Total votes		500,606	100.00%	N/A
Democratic hold				

==== By county ====
By county

County	Lisa Blunt Rochester Democratic		Eric Hansen Republican		Michael Katz IPoD		Margin		Total votes
County	#	%	#	%	#	%	#	%	Total votes
Kent	44,169	51.20	39,158	45.39	2,941	3.41	5,011	5.81	86,268
New Castle	176,195	65.26	82,475	30.55	11,335	4.20	93,720	34.71	270,005
Sussex	62,934	43.60	76,120	52.74	5,279	3.66	-13,186	-9.14	144,333
Totals	283,298	56.59	197,753	39.50	19,555	3.91	85,545	17.09	500,606

== Notes ==
Partisan clients
