= Cordelia Botkin =

American murderer (1854–1910)

Cordelia Brown Botkin
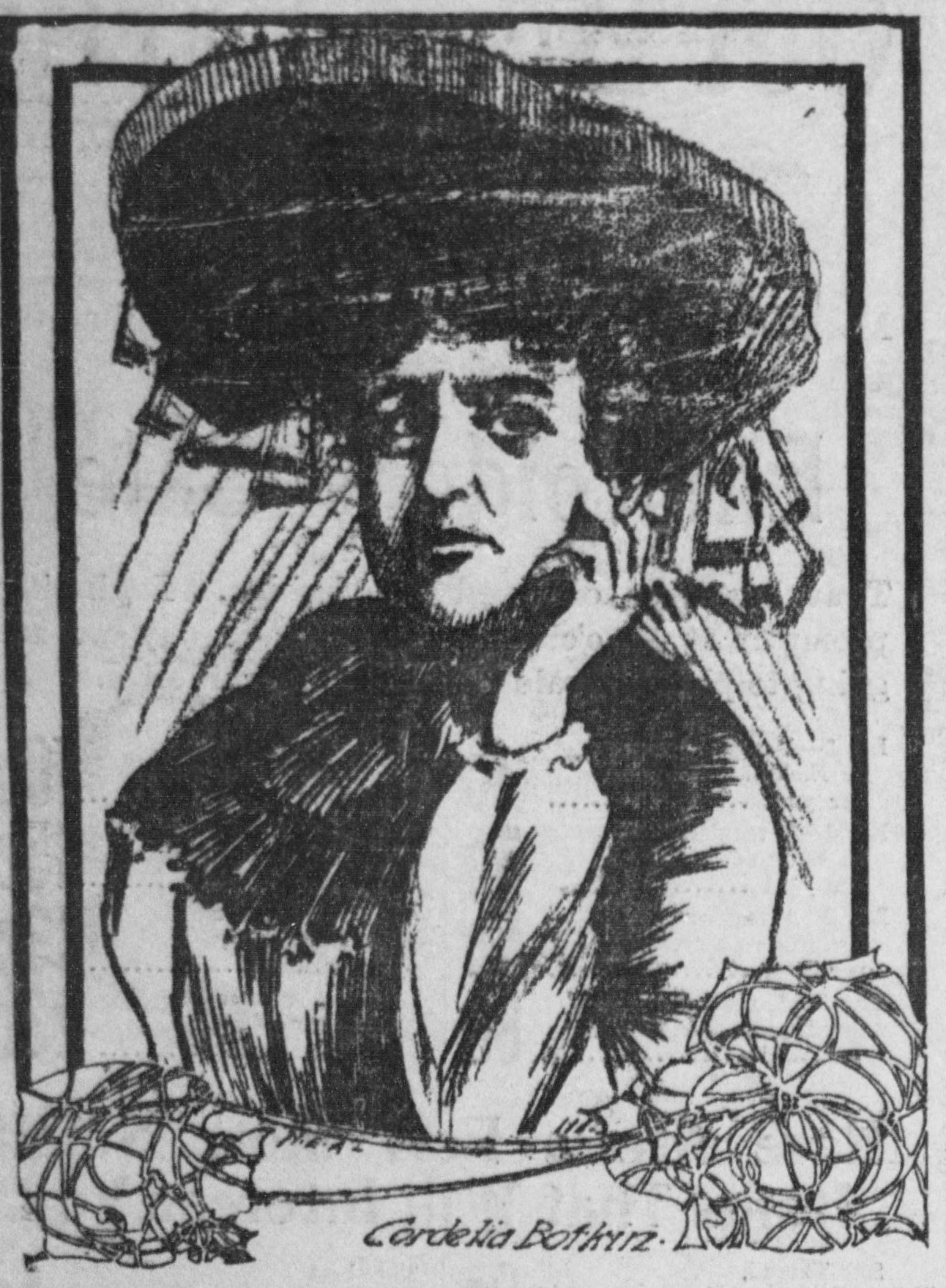
- Botkin in 1904.
- Born: 1854; Polk County, Missouri, US
- Died: March 7, 1910 (aged 55–56); San Quentin, California, US
- Spouse: Welcome Aplin Botkin
- Children: 1

Cordelia Botkin (1854 – March 7, 1910) was an American murderer who sent a box of poisoned candy to her ex-lover's wife. This was the first American prosecution for a crime which took place in two different jurisdictions, as Botkin had sent the poison from California, but it was received in Delaware.

== Background ==
Botkin was born in Polk County, Missouri in 1854. She later moved with her family to California, where she married her husband, Welcome Botkin. They were the parents of one son.

In 1895, Botkin met John Preston Dunning while he was bicycling in San Francisco's Golden Gate Park. At the time she was 41 years old, nine years his senior. Both of them were married, but Dunning was smitten with her. Dunning was a highly regarded reporter for the Associated Press, having completed overseas assignments in Samoa and Chile. He had been promoted to superintendent of the Associated Press's Western Division bureau in San Francisco.

In 1896, Dunning's wife, Mary Elizabeth (Penington) Dunning, upset by her husband's marital indiscretions, left him and returned with their daughter to Dover, Delaware, to the home of her father, former Congressman John B. Penington. By then Botkin had become Dunning's lover and constant companion. Botkin was estranged from her own husband, a grain broker in Stockton, California, but he supported her with regular remittances. Dunning, a heavy drinker, was fired by the Associated Press when it was discovered that he had embezzled $4,000 in office funds to pay his gambling debts. He was next let go by newspapers in Salt Lake City and San Francisco because of his habitual drunkenness. He then moved into Botkin's hotel.

The affair lasted almost three years but ended when Dunning was re-hired in March 1898 as the agency's lead reporter for what would become the Spanish–American War. When he left San Francisco, he told the weeping Botkin that he would not return. He reconciled with his wife before leaving for Cuba, where he helped save survivors of the Spanish battleships that were sunk at the Battle of Santiago de Cuba on July 2, 1898.

== Murders ==
Cordelia Botkin sent anonymous letters to Elizabeth Dunning detailing her husband's affairs. On August 9, 1898, Elizabeth opened a box of candies addressed to her and her sister in Dover, Delaware. It was only "With love to yourself and baby." "Passionately fond of candy," according to her husband, Dunning took at least three pieces herself and shared the rest with others on the porch of her father's home. After two days in agony, Elizabeth and her older sister, 44-year-old Ida Harriet Deane, died from arsenic poisoning. Four others who had sampled the chocolates survived. Elizabeth's father remarked upon the familiar handwriting on the note and saw that it matched the taunting letters he had kept in a drawer. Police traced the candy to a shop in San Francisco, and from there, to Botkin.

== Trial ==
Cordelia Botkin was prosecuted in the murder trial on April 30, 1904. Botkin was tried before Judge Carroll Cook.

Newspaper accounts of the proceedings highlighted testimony from witnesses connected to the purchase of arsenic and the preparation of the candy box, including a drug store clerk and a confectionery employee.

She was convicted of murder in December 1898, appealed, and was convicted again at a retrial in 1904. She was sentenced to life imprisonment.

== Death ==
Botkin was initially imprisoned in San Francisco, CA, but after the 1906 San Francisco earthquake was transferred to San Quentin State Prison, where she died in 1910. John Dunning, his career destroyed by the revelations during the trial, died two years earlier in Philadelphia.

== Other sources ==
- Transcript on Appeal: People of the State of California, respondent, versus Cordelia Botkin, defendant. Complaint 12,579. San Francisco Superior Court Criminal Case 632. Filed 29 February 1900, with Supreme Court of State of California. Item W.P.A. No. 29080 and 27069, California State Archives, Sacramento, CA. (Original trial records were destroyed in the 1906 San Francisco earthquake.)
- "The Gifts of Cordelia: The Case of Cordelia Botkin" by Lenore Offord in San Francisco Murders (1947), ed. Joseph Henry Jackson. Duell, Sloan and Pierce, New York
- Tales of Love and Hate in Old San Francisco (1971), Millie Robbins. Chronicle Books, San Francisco (ISBN 0-87701-071-8 OCLC 206797)
- Dying for Chocolate: Cordelia Botkin and the 1898 Poisoned Candy Murders (2020), Kerry Segrave. Exposit Books, McFarland, North Carolina
