= Richard R. Wier Jr. =

American politician (born 1941)

39th Attorney General of Delaware
- In office January 21, 1975 – January 16, 1979
- Governor: Sherman W. Tribbitt; Pete du Pont
- Preceded by: W. Laird Stabler Jr.
- Succeeded by: Richard S. Gebelein

Personal details
- Born: May 19, 1941 (age 83); Wilmington, Delaware
- Political party: Democratic

Richard R. Wier Jr. (born May 19, 1941) is an American politician who served as the Attorney General of Delaware from 1975 to 1979.
