= Michael Katz (politician) =

American politician (born 1962)

Mike Katz

Member of the Delaware Senate from the 4th district
- In office January 2009 – January 8, 2013
- Preceded by: Charlie Copeland
- Succeeded by: Gregory Lavelle

Personal details
- Born: January 1962 (age 64)
- Party: Democratic (before 2023); Delaware Independent (2023–2026); Republican (2026–present)
- Education: Bates College (BS); Georgetown University (MS, MD, MBA)
- Website: Campaign website

Michael S. Katz (born January 1962) is an American physician and politician from the state of Delaware. Katz represented the 4th district in the Delaware State Senate for one term, serving from 2009 to 2013. He made a short-lived bid for President of the United States in the 2020 election. Originally a member of the Democratic Party, Katz later joined the Independent Party of Delaware. He was the Independent Party's nominee for U.S. Senate in the 2024 election. He later joined the Republican Party, and was nominated by the party for the 2026 U.S. Senate election in its primary and lost to incumbent Democrat Chris Coons in the general election.

== Professional career ==
Katz is an anesthesiologist, having been trained in pediatric anesthesia at Boston Children's Hospital and Harvard Medical School. He also owns a real estate company. Katz received an MBA from Georgetown University School of Business, a BS from Bates College, and an MD from Georgetown University School of Medicine.

== Political career ==
Katz ran for the 4th district of the Delaware Senate in 2008. The Republican incumbent, Senate Minority Leader Charlie Copeland, was not seeking re-election, instead running for lieutenant governor. The 4th district is historically competitive, due in part to its high amount of third-party and independent voters. At the time, Republicans had a voter registration advantage in the district. Katz campaigned on a platform of improving public schools and increasing access to healthcare. Katz won the Democratic nomination over nonprofit executive Dee Durham with 63.0% of the vote before edging out Republican State Committee of Delaware member John Clatworthy in the general election by just 1.3%. Katz raised $97,039 for his campaign.

While in office, Katz supported the movement to preserve the historic Murphy House; however, the house was demolished in 2012. Katz also introduced several bills aimed at increasing transparency requirements for lobbyists, though none of them passed committee. In 2011, Katz accused Democratic state representative Bryon Short of plagiarizing a bill he wrote to establish an accreditation process for abortion clinics. Katz also refused to list Short as a cosponsor on his bill due to what he perceived as Short's "poor treatment of the medical community during his private and public deliberations" on an earlier bill. Short acknowledged his bill was very similar to Katz's bill, but argued that both bills were based on language written by the Delaware Department of Health and Social Services and the Medical Society of Delaware months earlier. Short also believed that Katz's bill contained too many protections for doctors, saying "each piece of legislation Sen. Katz introduced has skewed in favor of his profession." Katz asked House Majority Leader Pete Schwartzkopf to open an ethics investigation into Short, but Schwartzkopf refused, pointing out that only members of the House could make such a request. Schwartzkopf also commented that Katz "doesn’t think anyone should propose legislation involving doctors except for him." However, in 2012, Katz and Short collaborated on a bill to strengthen restrictions on door-to-door salesmen that successfully passed the legislature.

Katz ran for re-election in 2012 and was unopposed in the Democratic primary. In the general election, he faced Republican Gregory Lavelle, the Minority Leader of the Delaware House of Representatives. Lavelle had chosen to run for state senate after he and 4 other Republican state representatives were placed in the same district as a result of the 2010 redistricting cycle. Lavelle defeated Katz by a margin of 3.3%. The race was one of the most expensive of the 2012 Delaware Senate elections, with Katz raising $245,128 for his campaign.

Katz returned to politics in 2019 when he announced a bid for the Democratic presidential nomination. His campaign was centered on five issues: "achieving the promise of civil rights for all, universal healthcare, transforming our educational system, modernizing our workforce, and getting in front of climate change." He withdrew from the race before any votes were cast.

Katz accepted the Independent Party of Delaware's nomination for U.S. Senate at its July 1, 2023 convention in Dover, serving as state party chair from 2023 to 2026, succeeded by Ben Woratyla.

Katz accepted the Republican State Committee of Delaware's endorsement for the U.S. Senate at its April 25, 2026 convention in Dover. He won the primary on September 15, 2026.

== Personal life ==
Katz lives with his wife Trish. He has three children, Abigail, Emily, and Sander.

In 2011, Katz and his two daughters were riding a ski lift at a Maine ski resort when their chair detached and fell 35 feet to the ground. All three were injured, with Katz suffering a broken back and a traumatic brain injury. One of his daughters was thrown from the chair on impact, while the other was dragged up the mountain because a piece of her ski equipment became stuck in the chair. The incident became a contentious issue during Katz's 2012 re-election campaign, as his opponent accused him of using his injuries as an excuse for frequently missing state meetings. In 2013, Katz filed a lawsuit against the ski resort. The resort requested a dismissal on the grounds that Katz had signed a waiver before attending, but a judge rejected the request and allowed the suit to continue. The suit was settled out of court in 2015 for an undisclosed sum.

Party political offices
Preceded by Lauren Witzke	Republican nominee for U.S. Senator from Delaware (Class 2); 2026	Most recent
