= Charles B. Lore Elementary School =

- U.S. National Register of Historic Places
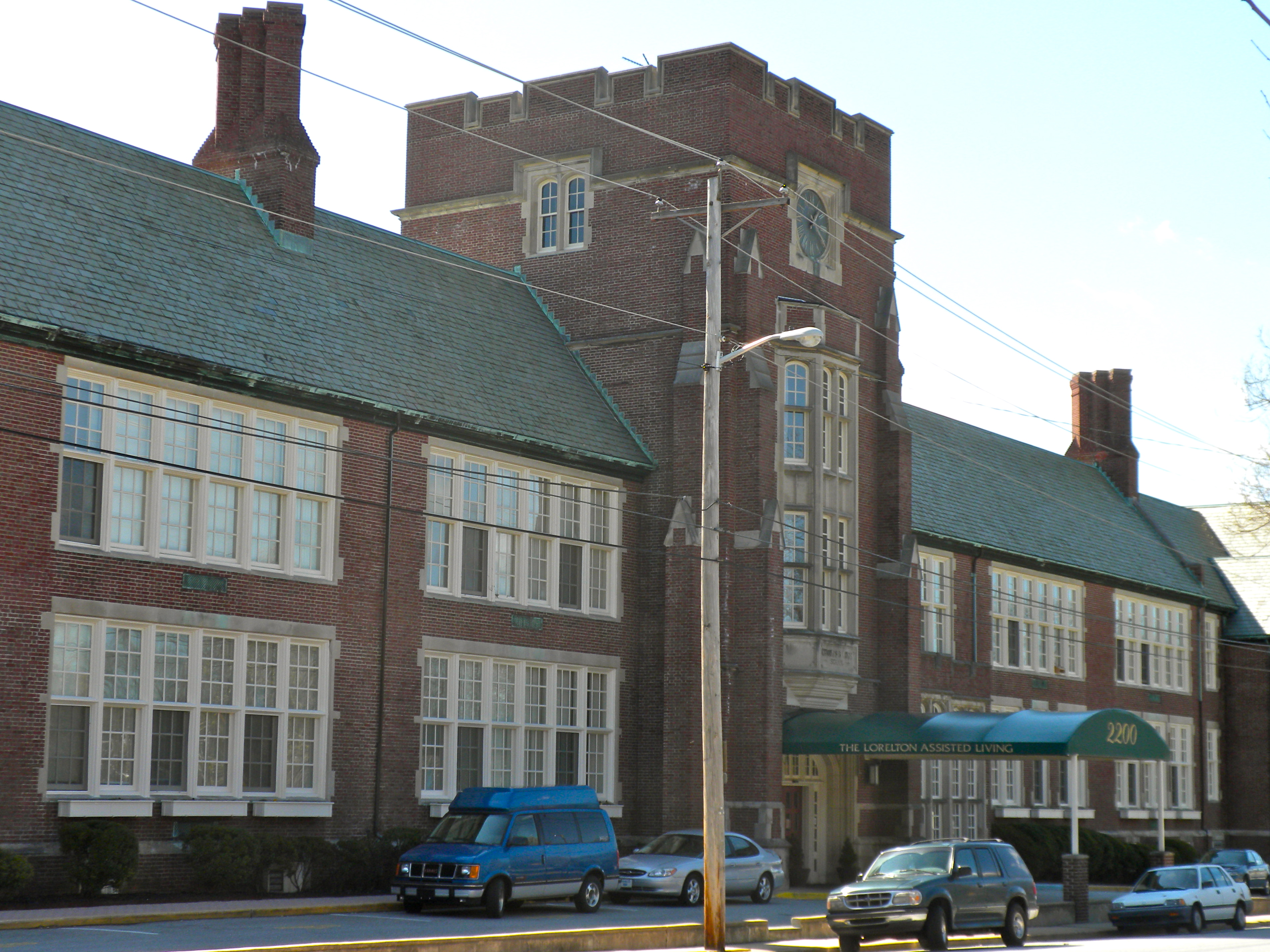
- Charles B. Lore School, March 2010

- Location within Delaware Location within the United States
- Location: Fourth St. and Woodlawn Ave., Wilmington, Delaware
- Coordinates: 39°45′0″N 75°34′34″W
- Area: 2 acres (0.81 ha)
- Built: 1932
- Built by: Francis, William, B. and Co
- Architect: Guilbert and Betelle
- Architectural style: Tudor Revival, English Collegiate Gothic
- NRHP reference No.: 83001337
- Added to NRHP: June 16, 1983

Charles B. Lore Elementary School is a historic elementary school building located in Wilmington, New Castle County, Delaware. It was built in 1932, and is a 2 1/2-story, E-shaped red brick building in the Collegiate Gothic style. It features a four-story central tower, steep pitched, slate gable roof, stone surrounds on windows and doors, and battlements above entryways. The school was named for Charles B. Lore (1831–1911). It was closed in 1981 because of declining enrollment. Prior to its closure, it was a part of the Red Clay School District. It was later converted to an assisted living facility.

It was added to the National Register of Historic Places in 1983.
