= Carl Danberg =

American lawyer

Carl C. Danberg
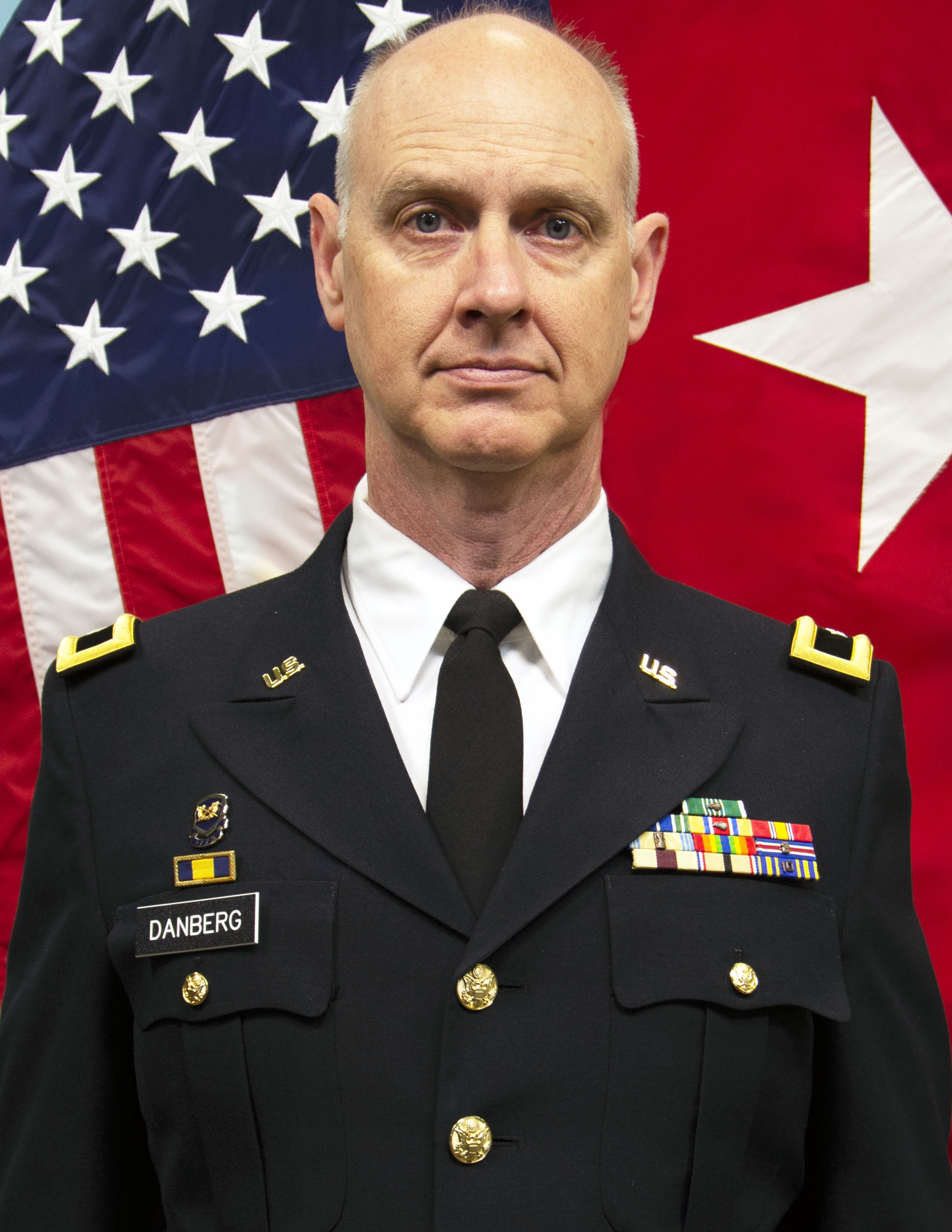

Commissioner of the Delaware Department of Correction
- In office January 3, 2007 – March 19, 2013
- Preceded by: Stanley Taylor

43rd Attorney General of Delaware
- In office December 7, 2005 – January 3, 2007
- Governor: Ruth Ann Minner
- Preceded by: M. Jane Brady
- Succeeded by: Beau Biden

Personal details
- Born: August 29, 1964 (age 62) Silver Spring, Maryland, U.S.
- Party: Democratic
- Spouse: Barbara Snapp
- Children: 2
- Education: University of Delaware (BS); Widener University (JD); United States Army War College (MS)
- Profession: Judge

Carl C. Danberg (born August 29, 1964) is an American judge from Newark in New Castle County, Delaware. He is a member of the Democratic Party and was the Attorney General of Delaware, and commissioner of the Delaware Department of Correction. He also serves as a brigadier general in the Delaware Army National Guard.

== Early life and family ==
Danberg was born in Silver Spring, Maryland, the son of James and Mary Lou Danberg. He is a graduate of the University of Delaware, and Widener University School of Law. He earned a Masters of Strategic Studies at the United States Army War College in 2018. He married Barbara Snapp, a fellow attorney. They have two daughters, reside in Newark and are members of St. John Roman Catholic Church there. He is a former adjunct professor at the University of Delaware, teaching constitutional law of criminal procedure, and is a brigadier general serving as Assistant Adjutant General (Army) Delaware National Guard.

== Professional career ==
Danberg was the Deputy Principal Assistant to the Commissioner of the Delaware Department of Correction for nearly ten years handling external affairs. He was responsible for community, legislative and media relations, managing victim services, budget preparation, and drafting legislation as well as training and advising correction staff. Later he held the position of Chief Deputy Attorney General advising his predecessor on legal and management issues within the Delaware Department of Justice.

On December 7, 2005, he was appointed Attorney General upon M. Jane Brady's resignation to accept an appointment to the Delaware Superior Court. His office is elective, and he did not seek reelection when his term expired in January 2007.

On January 3, 2007, he was nominated by Governor Ruth Ann Minner as Commissioner of the Delaware Department of Correction to replace retiring Commissioner Stan Taylor. He took office upon confirmation by the Delaware Senate.

Danberg was appointed judge of the Court of Common Pleas for New Castle County, State of Delaware, by Governor Jack Markell, confirmed by the Delaware Senate and sworn in February 2013. He was then appointed Chief judge of the Court of Common Pleas for the State of Delaware by Governor John Carney, confirmed by the Delaware Senate and sworn in May 2021.

== Almanac ==
Elections are held the first Tuesday after November 1. The Attorney General takes office the third Tuesday of January and has a four-year term. Danberg completed a current term.

Public offices
Office	Type	Location	Elected	Took office	Left office	Notes
Attorney General	Executive	Dover	N/A (appointed)	December 7, 2005	January 16, 2007	Delaware

Legal offices
Preceded by M. Jane Brady	Attorney General of Delaware; 2005–2007	Succeeded by Beau Biden
