= Charles Oberly =

American politician

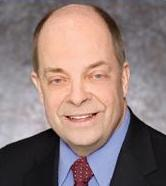

United States Attorney for the District of Delaware
- In office January 24, 2011 – March 10, 2017
- President: Barack Obama; Donald Trump
- Preceded by: Colm Connolly
- Succeeded by: David C. Weiss

41st Attorney General of Delaware
- In office January 1983 – March 1995
- Governor: Pete du Pont; Mike Castle; Dale E. Wolf; Tom Carper
- Preceded by: Richard S. Gebelein
- Succeeded by: M. Jane Brady

Personal details
- Born: November 9, 1946 (age 79) Wilmington, Delaware, U.S.
- Party: Democratic
- Education: Wesley College (AA); Pennsylvania State University (BA); University of Virginia (JD)

Charles Monroe Oberly III (born November 9, 1946) is an American attorney from Delaware. He had served as United States Attorney for the District of Delaware from 2010 to 2017 and had served as Attorney General of Delaware from 1983 to 1995.

== Early life and education ==
Oberly was born in 1946 in Wilmington, Delaware. He earned an associate's degree from Wesley College in 1966. Oberly then received a Bachelor of Arts from Pennsylvania State University in 1968 and a Juris Doctor from University of Virginia School of Law in 1971.

== Career ==
Oberly was the Democratic Party's nominee in the 1994 Delaware Senate election. He was defeated by the incumbent senator, Republican William Roth. Oberly's unsuccessful Senate campaign was managed by Delaware native David Plouffe, who would go on to manage Barack Obama's 2008 presidential campaign. In 1995, he and Kathy Jennings opened their own law firm.

In a publicized 2001 Wilmington trial, Oberly represented a former high school teacher who was accused of raping one of his students. The case ended in a hung jury, and Oberly later secured a plea deal for the former teacher for child endangerment charges.

On September 16, 2010, President Barack Obama nominated Oberly to serve as United States Attorney for the District of Delaware. He was confirmed by the United States Senate on December 10, 2010. In March 2017, Oberly was dismissed by United States Attorney General Jeff Sessions.

== See also ==
- 2017 dismissal of U.S. attorneys

Legal offices
Preceded by Richard S. Gebelein	Attorney General of Delaware; 1983–1995	Succeeded by M. Jane Brady
Preceded by Colm Connolly	United States Attorney for the District of Delaware; 2011–2017	Succeeded by David C. Weiss
Party political offices
Preceded by Shien Biau Woo	Democratic nominee for U.S. Senator from Delaware (Class 1); 1994	Succeeded by Tom Carper
