= Kathy Jennings =

American attorney and politician (born 1953)

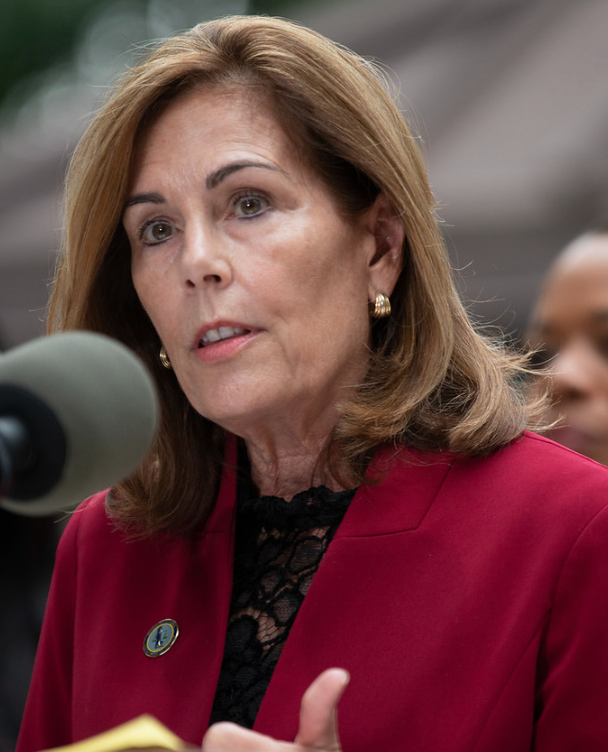
- Jennings in 2022

46th Attorney General of Delaware
- Incumbent
- Assumed office January 1, 2019
- Governor: John Carney; Bethany Hall-Long; Matt Meyer
- Preceded by: Matthew Denn

Personal details
- Born: April 4, 1953 (age 73) Wilmington, Delaware, U.S.
- Party: Democratic
- Spouse: David White
- Children: 2
- Education: University of Delaware (BA); Villanova University (JD)

Kathleen M. Jennings (born April 4, 1953) is an American lawyer and politician serving as the Attorney General of Delaware. She is a member of the Democratic Party.

== Early life and education ==
Jennings was born on April 4, 1953 in Wilmington, Delaware. She was raised by a single mother, who was the first person in her family to ever graduate college, and two grandparents in Downtown Wilmington. Her Grandfather was a WWII veteran and union carpenter during her childhood. Jennings graduated from Mount Pleasant High School in 1971 and subsequently earned a Bachelor of Arts degree in English from the University of Delaware and Juris Doctor from the Villanova University School of Law.

== Career ==
Jennings began her career in the Delaware Department of Justice, spending over twenty years as a state prosecutor and chief deputy attorney general, with other stints in county government and private practice, before winning office for the first time in 2018.

When she got to the Delaware DOJ upon her graduation from Villanova Law School, she was one of only two women in the Criminal Division's office. Among hundreds of other cases, including domestic violence, sexual assault, and homicide cases, she successfully tried serial killer Steven Brian Pennell, one of the most prolific serial killers in Delaware history, admitting DNA evidence into court for the first time ever in a Delaware courtroom. Eventually, she rose to Chief Deputy Attorney General who is second in command in the Department of Justice. In 1995, she and former Attorney General Charles Oberly opened their own law firm, Oberly and Jennings, upon his departure from office after 3 terms as Attorney General and an unsuccessful run for United States Senate in 1994. In 2011, she returned to the Delaware DOJ as State Prosecutor in former Attorney General Beau Biden's office.

After her second stint in the Delaware DOJ, Jennings served as Chief Administrative Officer for New Castle County for one year under now Governor Matt Meyer to help get his office running after his unexpected victory in the 2016 New Castle County Executive election. In his office, as his second in command, she managed a budget of almost $300 million and oversaw a staff of roughly 1,500. She resigned in January 2018 in order to run for Attorney General of Delaware, after incumbent Attorney General and former Lieutenant Governor Matt Denn announced he would not seek reelection for a second term.

After a hotly contested primary election, she comfortably won the Democratic Party nomination in a 4 way primary, winning every county and over 56% of the votes cast. She defeated Republican nominee Bernard Pepukayi in the general election by over 23% and with over 60% of the vote in a landslide, the largest margin of victory for a Delaware Attorney General in an election that was contested by both major parties since 1928. She was sworn into office on January 1, 2019.

In the 2022 election, after running unopposed in the Democratic primary, Jennings won a second term in a much closer election, defeating Republican Julianne Murray by roughly 8 points and taking roughly 54 percent of the vote, the best performance for a Republican running for Attorney General in over a decade as Democratic President Joe Biden's approvals in his home state suffered.

Jennings has participated in several Attorney General conferences during her time in office. In addition to several events around the United States, she and her husband, along with dozens of other Attorneys General from around the country, traveled to South Africa in November 2023 for an event paid for by the Attorney General Alliance (AGA), a nonprofit. AGA brings all Attorneys General from across the country together for non-partisan discussions with each other and with corporations who financially back the organization on issues facing their states and the country. AGA has come under some scrutiny in the past, as these corporate sponsorships include backing from companies that state attorneys general are often tasked with investigating. While no taxpayer money paid for her flights, lodging, or any other expenses incurred during the trip, Jennings's $6,500 annual membership in the alliance that allowed her to attend this trip was funded by Delaware taxpayers.

During her travels to South Africa, Jennings and Mississippi Attorney General Lynn Fitch, a Republican, worked together on strategies to help combat human trafficking, culminating in a 2025 letter signed by 40 Attorneys General intended to help shape new policies under HHS Secretary Robert F. Kennedy Jr.

Jennings ran for re-election in 2026. In the Democratic Primary, she won re-nomination after winning a three-way primary race with 71.2% of the vote. She went on to defeat David C. Graham in the general election with 63.6% of the vote, winning all three counties in the state for the first time.

== Personal life ==
Attorney General Jennings resides in the City of Wilmington and is married to David White, who is the president of the Delaware State Bar Association and an attorney. She has two adult children, a son who lives in Baltimore, Maryland and a daughter who resides in Wilmington, Delaware.

== Electoral history ==
2018 Delaware Attorney General Democratic primary
| Party | Candidate | Votes | % |
|---|---|---|---|
| Democratic | Kathy Jennings | 44,005 | 56.6 |
| Democratic | LaKresha Roberts | 17,584 | 21.64 |
| Democratic | Christofer Johnson | 12,195 | 14.99 |
| Democratic | Timothy P. Mulaney Sr. | 5,513 | 6.77 |
| Total votes | | 79,297 | 100.0 |

2018 Delaware Attorney General general election
| Party | Candidate | Votes | % |
|---|---|---|---|
| Democratic | Kathy Jennings | 218,351 | 61.31 |
| Republican | Bernard Pepukayi | 137,730 | 38.68 |
| Total votes | | 356,081 | 100.0 |
| Democratic hold | | | |

2022 Delaware Attorney General general election
| Party | Candidate | Votes | % |
|---|---|---|---|
| Democratic | Kathy Jennings (incumbent) | 171,837 | 53.83 |
| Republican | Julianne Murray | 147,369 | 46.17 |
| Total votes | | 319,206 | 100.0 |
| Democratic hold | | | |

2026 Delaware Attorney General Democratic primary
| Party | Candidate | Votes | % |
|---|---|---|---|
| Democratic | Kathy Jennings (incumbent) | 61,191 | 71.2 |
| Democratic | Dwayne J. Bensing | 20,359 | 23.7 |
| Democratic | Patty Rickman | 4,417 | 5.1 |
| Total votes | | 85,967 | 100.0 |

2026 Delaware Attorney General general election
| Party | Candidate | Votes | % |
|---|---|---|---|
| Democratic | Kathy Jennings (incumbent) | 240,429 | 63.6 |
| Republican | David C. Graham | 137,464 | 36.4 |
| Total votes | | 377,893 | 100.0 |
| Democratic hold | | | |

Legal offices
| Preceded by Matthew Denn | Attorney General of Delaware; 2019–present | Incumbent |
