= 2020 Delaware gubernatorial election =

- November 3, 2020
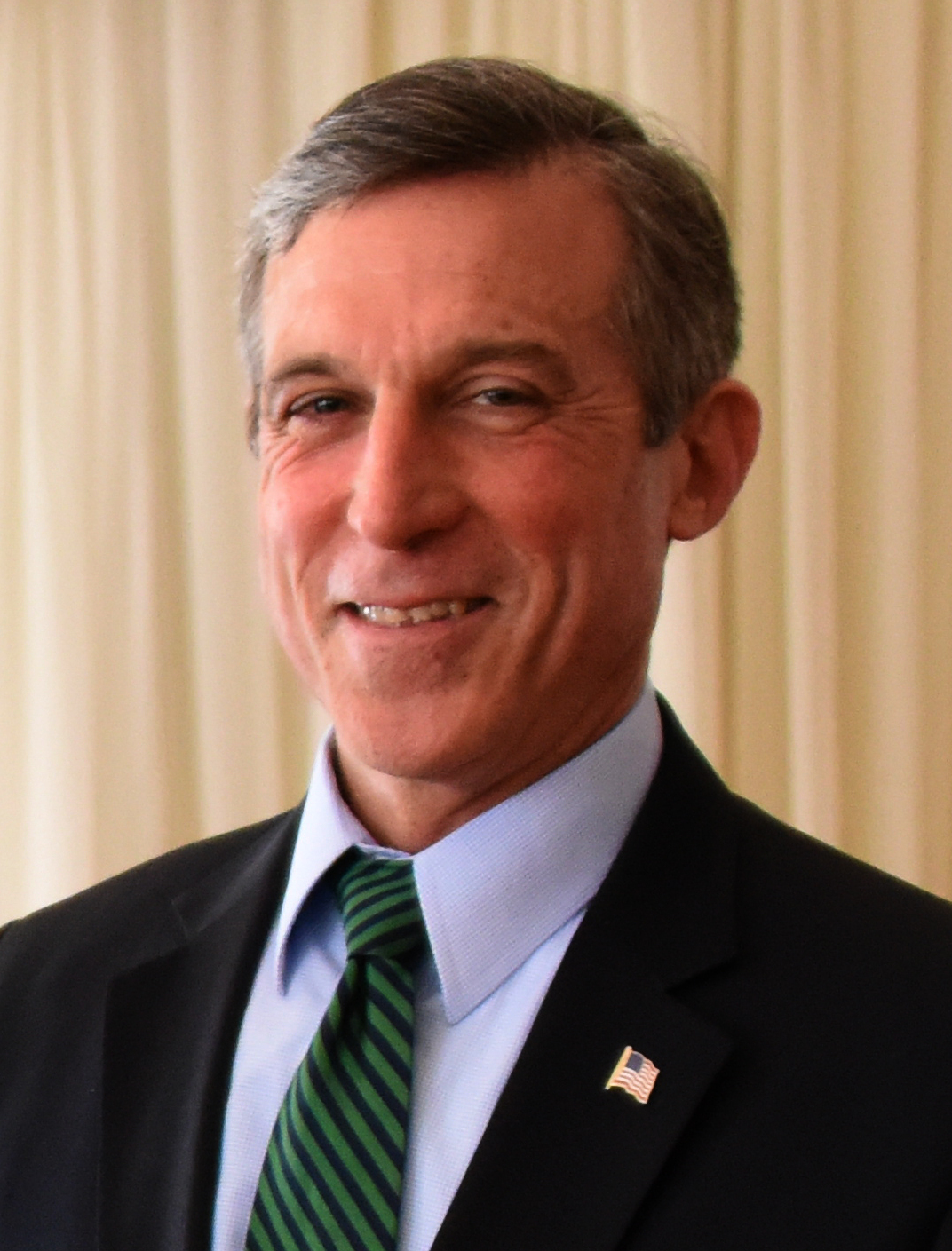

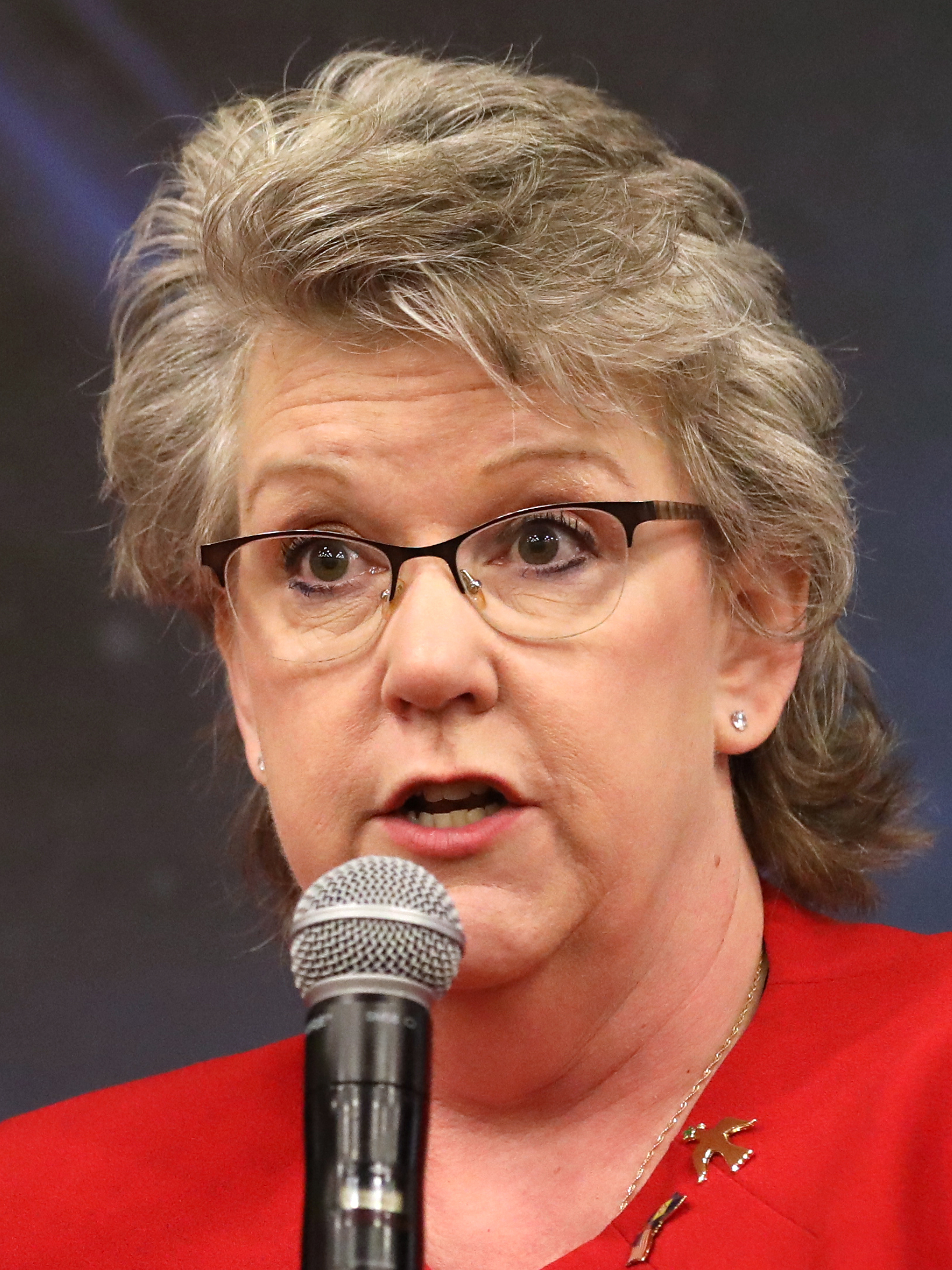
Nominee	John Carney	Julianne Murray
Party	Democratic	Republican
Popular vote	292,903	190,312
Percentage	59.46%	38.63%
- Carney: 40–50% 50–60% 60–70% 70–80% 80–90% >90% Murray: 40–50% 50–60% 60–70% 70–80% 80–90% No data
Governor before election
John Carney
Democratic
Elected Governor
John Carney
Democratic

The 2020 Delaware gubernatorial election was held on November 3, 2020, to elect the governor of Delaware, concurrently with the 2020 U.S. presidential election, as well as elections to the United States Senate and elections to the United States House of Representatives and various state and local elections. Incumbent Democratic governor John Carney was re-elected to a second term, defeating Republican Julianne Murray in a landslide.

== Democratic primary ==
=== Candidates ===
==== Nominee ====
- John Carney, incumbent governor of Delaware

==== Eliminated in the primary ====
- David Lamar Williams Jr., accountant and community activist

=== Results ===
Results by county: Carney—80–90%

Democratic primary results
Party	Candidate	Votes	%
Democratic	John Carney (incumbent)	101,142	84.77%
Democratic	David Lamar Williams, Jr.	18,169	15.23%
Total votes		119,311	100.00%

==== Results by county ====
County	John Carney	%	David Lamar Williams Jr.	%	Total
Kent	13,396	81.95%	2,950	18.05%	16,346
New Castle	67,063	84.17%	12,615	15.83%	79,678
Sussex	20,683	88.82%	2,604	11.18%	23,287
Total	101,142	84.77%	18,169	15.23%	119,311

== Republican primary ==
The Republican primary was hotly contested between Julianne Murray, an attorney from Georgetown, and Colin Bonini, a Delaware state senator from the 16th district and the Republican nominee for the governor of Delaware in 2016. Murray ended up winning the nomination. Although Bonini won Kent and New Castle counties, the latter of which is home to Wilmington and is the most populous county in the state, Murray won Sussex County, which is the most Republican county in the state and overall had the most votes, allowing her to carry the nomination.

=== Candidates ===
==== Nominee ====
- Julianne Murray, attorney

==== Eliminated in the primary ====
- Colin Bonini, state senator, nominee for Delaware State Treasurer in 2010, and nominee for Governor of Delaware in 2016
- David Bosco, small business owner
- David Graham
- Bryant Richardson, state senator
- Scott Walker, 2018 Republican nominee for the United States House of Representatives in Delaware

==== Withdrawn ====
- Kevin Baron, veteran
- Neil Shea, brewer, U.S. Marine Corps veteran

=== Results ===
Results by county: Bonini—40–50% Murray—40–50%

Republican primary results
Party	Candidate	Votes	%
Republican	Julianne Murray	22,819	41.15%
Republican	Colin Bonini	19,161	34.56%
Republican	Bryant Richardson	4,262	7.69%
Republican	Scott Walker	3,998	7.21%
Republican	David Bosco	3,660	6.60%
Republican	David Graham	1,547	2.79%
Total votes		55,447	100.00%

==== Results by county ====
County	Julianne Murray	%	Colin Bonini	%	Bryant L. Richardson	%	R.E. Scott Walker	%	David Bosco	%	Dave Graham	%	Total
Kent	3,876	35.75%	4,910	45.29%	556	5.13%	506	4.67%	690	6.36%	304	2.80%	10,842
New Castle	7,204	34.55%	8,529	40.90%	1,006	4.82%	1,959	9.39%	1,398	6.70%	756	3.63%	20,852
Sussex	11,739	49.42%	5,722	24.09%	2,700	11.37%	1,533	6.45%	1,572	6.62%	487	2.05%	23,753
Total	22,819	41.15%	19,161	34.56%	4,262	7.69%	3,998	7.21%	3,660	6.60%	1,547	2.79%	55,447

== Other candidates ==
=== Libertarian Party ===
==== Nominee ====
- John Machurek

=== Independent Party of Delaware ===
==== Nominee ====
- Kathy DeMatteis

== General election ==
=== Predictions ===
Source	Ranking	As of
The Cook Political Report	Safe D	October 23, 2020
Inside Elections	Safe D	October 28, 2020
Sabato's Crystal Ball	Safe D	November 2, 2020
Politico	Safe D	November 2, 2020
Daily Kos	Safe D	October 28, 2020
RCP	Safe D	November 2, 2020
270towin	Safe D	November 2, 2020

=== Polling ===
Poll source	Date(s) administered	Sample size (Note: Key: A – all adults RV – registered voters LV – likely voters V – unclear)	Margin of error	John Carney (D)	Julianne Murray (R)	Other/ Undecided
University of Delaware	September 21–27, 2020	847 (LV)	–	55%	26%	19% (Note: "None/other/undecided" with 13%; DeMatteis (DI) with 4%; Machurek (L) with 2%)

=== Results ===
Delaware gubernatorial election, 2020
Party	Candidate	Votes	%	±%
Democratic	John Carney (incumbent)	292,903	59.46%	+1.12%
Republican	Julianne Murray	190,312	38.63%	−0.55%
Independent Party	Kathy DeMatteis	6,150	1.25%	N/A
Libertarian	John Machurek	3,270	0.66%	−0.43%
Total votes		492,635	100.00%	N/A
Turnout		507,805	68.66%	
Registered electors		739,570		
Democratic hold				

==== By county ====
County	John Carney Democratic		Julianne Murray Republican		Kathy DeMatteis IPoD		John Machurek Libertarian		Margin		Total votes
County	#	%	#	%	#	%	#	%	#	%	Total votes
Kent	44,352	51.93	39,332	46.05	1,115	1.30	616	0.72	5,020	5.88	85,415
New Castle	191,678	68.45	82,545	29.48	3,785	1.35	2,031	0.72	109,133	38.97	280,039
Sussex	56,873	44.72	68,435	53.81	1,250	0.98	623	0.49	-11,562	-9.09	127,181
Totals	292,903	59.46	190,312	38.63	6,150	1.25	3,270	0.66	102,591	20.83	492,635
