= National Association of Attorneys General =

- Formation: 1907; 119 years ago
- Type: 501(c)(3) nonprofit
- Purpose: "The nonpartisan national forum providing collaboration, insight and expertise to empower and champion America's attorneys general."
- President: William Tong (D)
- Affiliations: NAAG Mission Foundation
- Website: www.naag.org

The National Association of Attorneys General (NAAG) is a 501(c)(3) nonprofit organization of state and territory attorneys general in the United States. The United States Attorney General, as a member of the federal government, is not a member of NAAG.

NAAG is governed by member attorneys general, with a president and executive committee serving as the primary decision-making body. The current NAAG president is Oregon Attorney General Ellen Rosenblum (D). The president-elect is New Hampshire Attorney General John Formella (R). NAAG's vice president is Connecticut Attorney General William Tong (D), and the group's immediate past president is Ohio Attorney General Dave Yost (R). Maine Attorney General Aaron Frey (D), Ohio Attorney General Dave Yost (R), Mississippi Attorney General Lynn Fitch (R), and South Dakota Attorney General Marty Jackley (R) serve as region chairs.

NAAG finances itself on an annual basis mostly through dues from member offices. Annual dues are paid with taxpayer dollars. NAAG's annual budget is about $5.1 million, with annual membership dues accounting for $3.2 million of the group's proceeds. In addition, NAAG and its sister group, the NAAG Mission Foundation, have amassed over $250 million as part of companies resolving civil enforcement actions with state attorneys general. NAAG has lent millions of dollars to state attorneys general to facilitate investigations and lawsuits against companies and industries. Loans are repaid to NAAG when the case or investigation is resolved. For example, in the 2021 McKinsey Opioid Settlement, NAAG received $15 million (more than many states) to repay a $7 million loan. NAAG also negotiated a direct payment to itself in the 1998 tobacco settlement, which infused NAAG with $103 million, mostly from Philip Morris. NAAG also obtained $15 million as part of a $25 billion settlement with Bank of America and other mortgage lenders in 2012.

In recent years the group has been accused of being increasingly aligned with the Democratic Party, with five Republican attorneys general resigning from the group since 2021. In May 2022, Attorney General of Kentucky Daniel Cameron led a multi-state letter to NAAG expressing concerns about the group's perceived partisanship. The letter said NAAG needs structural reform, greater transparency, and less partisan programming, and it asked NAAG to explain how its holding of capital from enforcement settlements is consistent with state constitutional and statutory restrictions. In September 2022, twelve Republican state attorneys general and various consumer advocates called for NAAG to return its $280 million in assets to the states.

== Management of settlement money ==
NAAG has received millions of dollars from past public enforcement settlements, including the Tobacco Master Settlement Agreement and the Volkswagen emissions scandal. Member states gave money to NAAG as part of the settlements. This money sits in restricted funds for specific, limited uses, with each fund governed by a board composed of attorneys general appointed by NAAG's executive committee. The boards that govern these various funds operate by majority vote, and currently most of them have Democratic majorities and are chaired by Republican attorneys general.

== Accusations of partisanship and Republican resignations ==
Starting in 2021, NAAG came under fire by Republicans for increasing Democratic partisanship in its actions and leadership.

Alabama Attorney General Steve Marshall (R) quit, citing the group's move to the left. Montana Attorney General Austin Knudsen (R) resigned from the group.

Arizona Attorney General Mark Brnovich (R), Missouri Attorney General Eric Schmitt, and Texas Attorney General Ken Paxton (R) resigned from the group in 2022. In a resignation letter, Paxton, Knudsen, and Schmitt wrote "The association's leftward shift over the past half decade has become intolerable. Indeed, this liberal bent has fundamentally undermined NAAG's role as a nonpartisan national forum." Brnovich's resignation letter stated that "The Association is supposed to function as a nonpartisan forum but the speakers and topics presented at recent NAAG meetings indicate otherwise. We believe NAAG must take immediate steps to remedy this partisan permeation."

== Past presidents ==
- 2025: John Formella (NH)
- 2024: Ellen Rosenblum (OR)
- 2023: Dave Yost (OH)
- 2022: Tom Miller (IA)
- 2021: Karl Racine (DC)
- 2020: Tim Fox (MT)
- 2018 – 2019: Jeff Landry (LA)
- 2017 – 2018: Derek Schmidt (KS)
- 2016 – 2017: George Jepsen (CT)
- 2015 – 2016: Marty Jackley (SD)
- 2014 – 2015: Jim Hood (MS)
- 2013 – 2014: JB Van Hollen (WI)
- 2012 – 2013: Doug Gansler (MD)
- 2011 – 2012: Rob McKenna (WA)
- 2010 – 2011: Roy Cooper (NC)
- 2009 – 2010: Jon Bruning (NE)
- 2008 – 2009: Patrick Lynch (RI)
- 2007 – 2008: Lawrence Wasden (ID)
- 2006 – 2007: Thurbert Baker (GA)
- 2005 – 2006: Stephen Carter (IN)
- 2004 – 2005: William Sorrell (VT)
- 2003 – 2004: Bill Lockyer (CA)
- 2002 – 2003: Drew Edmondson (OK)
- 2001 – 2002: Carla Stovall (KS)
- 2000 – 2001: Drew Ketterer (ME)
- 1999 – 2000: Christine Gregoire (WA)
- 1998 – 1999: Mike Moore (MS)

== See also ==
- Attorney General Alliance
