= W. Laird Stabler Jr. =

American politician (1930–2008)

United States Attorney for the District of Delaware
- In office 1975–1977
- President: Gerald Ford
- Preceded by: Ralph F. Keil
- Succeeded by: James W. Garvin Jr.

Attorney General of Delaware
- In office 1971–1975
- Governor: Russell W. Peterson; Sherman W. Tribbitt
- Preceded by: David P. Buckson
- Succeeded by: Richard R. Wier Jr.

Member of the Delaware House of Representatives from the 13th district
- In office 1965–1971
- Preceded by: Robert N. Downs, III
- Succeeded by: Andrew G. Knox

Personal details
- Born: Winder Laird Stabler Jr. May 2, 1930 Nashville, Tennessee, U.S.
- Died: February 24, 2008 (aged 77) Montchanin, Delaware, U.S.
- Party: Republican
- Spouse: Peg
- Children: 3
- Education: Princeton University (BA); University of Virginia (LLB)

Winder Laird Stabler Jr. (May 2, 1930 – February 24, 2008) was an American attorney and politician from the state of Delaware.

== Early life ==
Stabler was born in 1930 in Nashville, Tennessee. He moved with his family to Seaford at the age of nine. He attended school there until 1944. He then attended the Cranbrook School, a private school in Bloomfield Hills, Michigan.

Stabler graduated from Princeton University in 1952 and the University of Virginia Law School in 1954. He then returned to Delaware to practice law.

== Political career ==
Stabler was appointed as a deputy attorney general in 1961. In 1965, he was elected to the Delaware House of Representatives. He was re-elected in 1966 and 1968 and served as majority leader during his second term of office.

In 1970, Stabler was elected as the Attorney General of Delaware. He served a single term from 1971 until 1975. Following his tenure as Attorney General, Stabler was appointed as the U.S. Attorney for Delaware by President Gerald Ford in 1975. He served in that capacity until 1977.

Stabler served as the Republican National Committeeman for Delaware from 1985 until 2005.

== Illness and death ==
Stabler was diagnosed with oral cancer in 2005. He underwent two surgeries and the cancer went into remission. However, the cancer returned in 2007. He died on February 24, 2008, at the age of 77 in Montchanin, Delaware. He was survived by his wife, Peg and three children.

Delaware House of Representatives
Preceded by Robert N. Downs, III	Member of the Delaware House of Representatives from the 13th district 1965–1971	Succeeded by Andrew G. Knox
Legal offices
Preceded by David P. Buckson	Attorney General of Delaware; 1971–1975	Succeeded by Richard R. Wier Jr.
Preceded by Ralph F. Keil	United States Attorney for the District of Delaware; 1975–1977	Succeeded by James W. Garvin Jr.
