= 1994 United States Senate election in Delaware =

- November 8, 1994
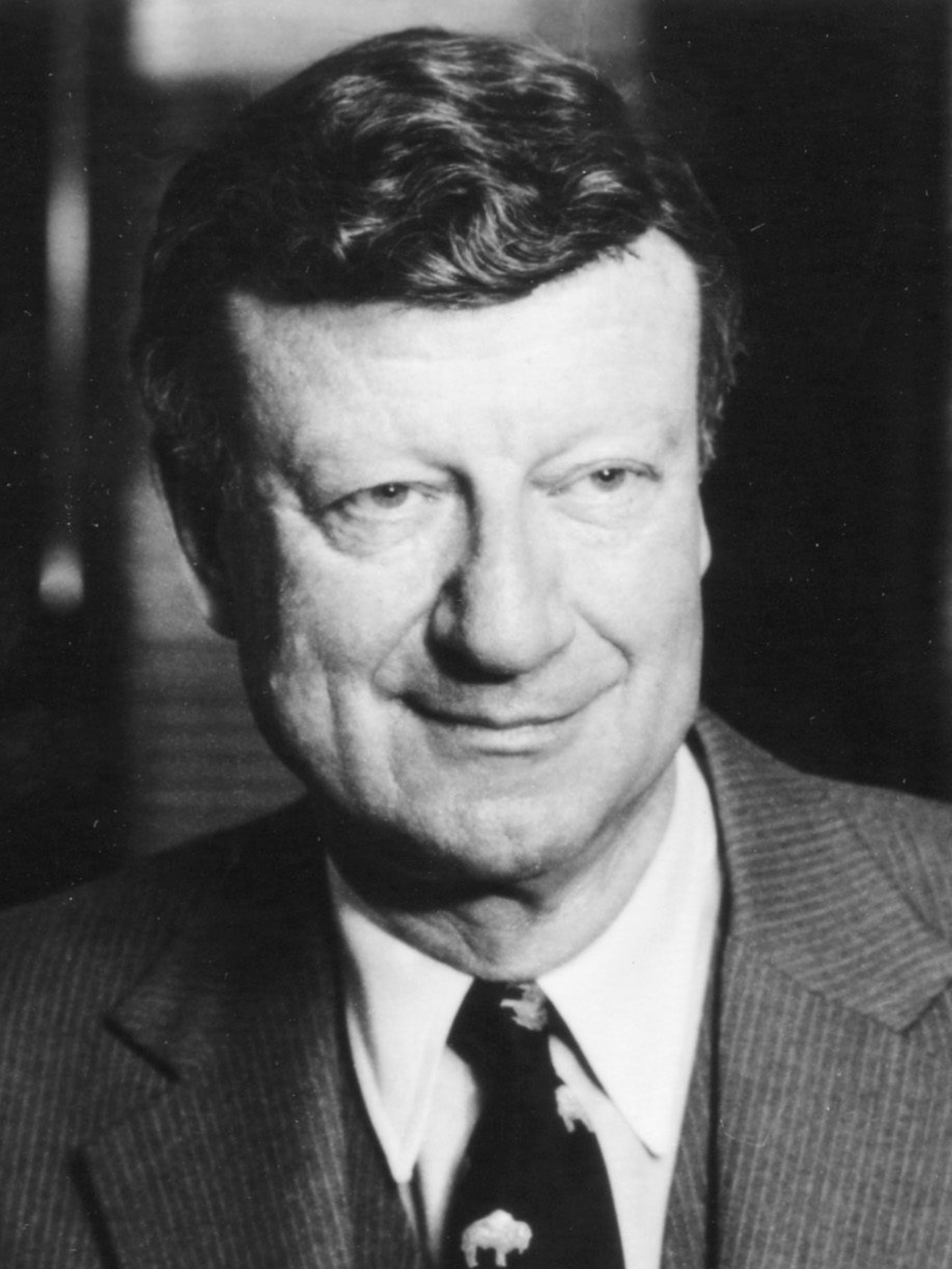

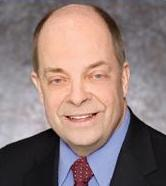
Nominee	Bill Roth	Charles Oberly
Party	Republican	Democratic
Popular vote	111,074	84,540
Percentage	55.82%	42.48%
- Roth: 40–50% 50–60% 60–70% Oberly: 40–50% 50–60% 60–70% 70–80%
U.S. senator before election
William V. Roth
Republican
Elected U.S. Senator
William V. Roth
Republican

The 1994 United States Senate election in Delaware was held November 8, 1994. Incumbent Senator William Roth won re-election to a fifth term. He was the first Delaware senator to do so, becoming the longest serving before being overtaken by Joe Biden in 2002.

As of 2026, this was the last time Republicans won a U.S. Senate election in Delaware.

== Candidates ==
=== Democratic ===
- Charles Oberly, Attorney General of Delaware

=== Republican ===
- William V. Roth, incumbent U.S. Senator

== Polling ==
Source	Date	Roth (R)	Oberly (D)
Wilmington News Journal	October 31, 1994	53%	37%

== Results ==
General election results
Party	Candidate	Votes	%	±%
Republican	William V. Roth (Incumbent)	111,074	55.82%	−6.25%
Democratic	Charles Oberly	84,540	42.48%	+4.54%
Libertarian	John Dierickx	3,386	1.70%	
Majority		26,534	13.33%	−10.79%
Turnout		199,000		
Republican hold		Swing		

== See also ==
- 1994 United States Senate elections
