= Delaware Attorney General =

Head of the Delaware Department of Justice

Attorney General of Delaware
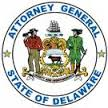

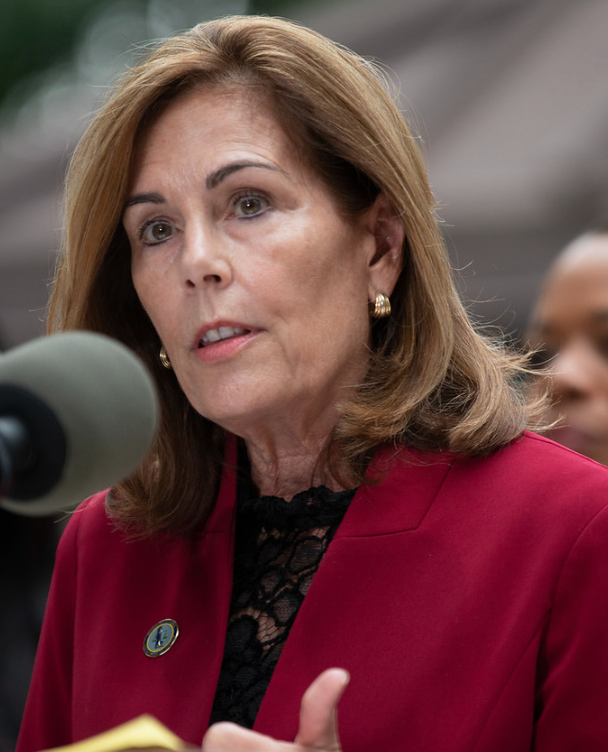
- Incumbent; Kathy Jennings since January 1, 2019
- Residence: Wilmington, Delaware
- Term length: Four years, no term limits
- Inaugural holder: Gunning Bedford Jr. February 1, 1783
- Succession: Third
- Website: Delaware Department of Justice - Attorney General Office

The attorney general of Delaware is a constitutional officer of the U.S. state of Delaware, and is the chief law officer and the head of the State Department of Justice. On January 1, 2019, Kathy Jennings was sworn in as the 46th attorney general of Delaware.

== Description of the office ==
The attorney general is elected to a four-year term in the "off-year" state election along with the state treasurer and state auditor, two years before/after the election of the governor. The attorney general, the state treasurer, state auditor, and state insurance commissioner offices are intended to serve as restraints to the governor's exclusive executive authority. The attorney general office existed in various forms prior to the ratification of the Delaware Constitution of 1776, which continued the existing colonial tradition of granting the governor the power to appoint the attorney general for a five-year tenure. With the ratification of the Delaware Constitution of 1897, the post was converted to its present four-year elected form, also establishing the attorney general as third in line of succession to the office of governor, after the lieutenant governor and secretary of state.

== Officeholders ==
Gunning Bedford Jr. was the first holder of the office after American independence. The office was held from 2007 to 2015 by Beau Biden, who was elected in 2006 and took office on January 2, 2007. He was a Democrat and the eldest son of 46th U.S. President and longest-serving U.S. Senator from Delaware Joe Biden.

#	Image	Name	Term of office	Political party
1		Gunning Bedford Jr.	1778–1790	
2		Nicholas Ridgely	1790–1801	
3		Nicholas Van Dyke	1801–1806	Federalist
4		Outerbridge Horsey	1806–1810	Federalist
5		Thomas Clayton	1810–1815	Federalist
6		James Rogers	1815–1830	
7		Robert Frame	1830–1835	
8		James Rogers	1835–1840	
9		Edward W. Gilpin	1840–1850	
10		Willard Saulsbury Sr.	1850–1855	Democratic
11		George P. Fisher	1855–1860	Unionist
12		Alfred Wooten	1860–1864	
13		Jacob Moore	1864–1869	Republican
14		Charles B. Lore	1869–1874	Democratic
15		John B. Penington	1874–1879	Democratic
16		George Gray	1879–1885	Democratic
17		John Henry Paynter	1885–1887	
18		John Biggs	1887–1892	
19		John R. Nicholson	1892–1895	
20		Robert C. White	1895–1901	
21		Herbert H. Ward	1901–1905	
22		Robert H. Richards	1905–1909	
23		Andrew C. Gray	1909–1913	
24		Josiah O. Wolcott	1913–1917	Democratic
25		David J. Reinhardt	1917–1921	
26		Sylvester D. Townsend Jr.	1921–1925	
27		Clarence A. Southerland	1925–1929	Republican
28		Reuben Satterthwaite Jr.	1929–1933	
29		Daniel J. Layton	1933	Republican
30		P. Warren Green	1933–1939	
31		James R. Morford	1939–1943	
32		Clair J. Killoran	1943–1947	
33		Albert W. James	1947–1951	
34		H. Albert Young	1951–1955	
35		Joseph D. Craven	1955–1959	Democratic
36		Januar D. Bove Jr.	1959–1963	Republican
37		David P. Buckson	1963–1971	Republican
38		W. Laird Stabler Jr.	1971–1975	Republican
39		Richard R. Wier Jr.	1975–1979	Democratic
40		Richard S. Gebelein	1979–1983	Republican
41		Charles Oberly	1983–1995	Democratic
42		M. Jane Brady	1995–2005	Republican
43		Carl C. Danberg	2005–2007	Democratic
44		Beau Biden	2007–2015	Democratic
45		Matthew Denn	2015–2019	Democratic
46		Kathy Jennings	2019–present	Democratic

== See also ==
- State attorney general
