= List of people from Delaware =

State flag of Delaware

Location of Delaware in the United States

This is a list of all people prominent enough to be contained in Wikipedia who were associated with the U.S. state of Delaware, including those who were born, lived or were otherwise associated with locally performed activities in a recognizable way.

== A ==
- Wilbur L. Adams (1884–1937) – U.S. representative from Delaware
- J. Edward Addicks (1841–1919) – gas tycoon; his attempts to buy a U.S. Senate seat bolstered support for the Seventeenth Amendment to the U.S. Constitution; lived in Claymont, Delaware
- J. Frank Allee (1857–1938) – jeweler; senator from Delaware
- Richard Allen (1760–1831) – founder, African Methodist Episcopal Church
- William F. Allen (1883–1946) – U.S. representative from Delaware
- Ann Althouse (born 1951) – law professor, legal blogger; born in Wilmington
- Thomas L. Ambro (born 1949) – judge on the U.S. Court of Appeals; worked in Wilmington
- John Andrews (1746–1813) – minister; academic
- Anthony J. Arduengo (born 1952) – chemist; material scientist; discoverer of stable carbenes
- Adrienne Arsht (born 1942) – lawyer; philanthropist; born in Wilmington

== B ==
Ba–Bm

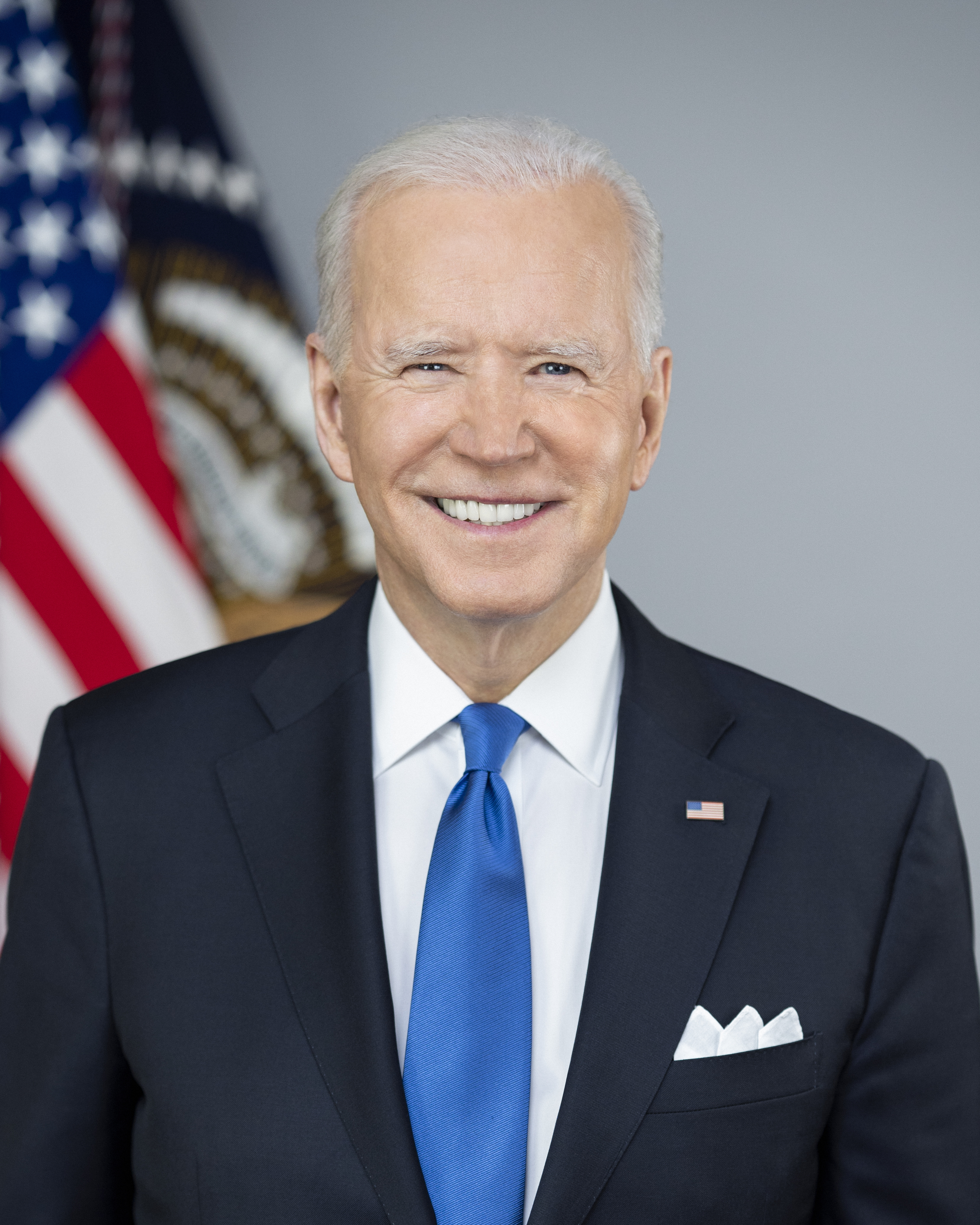
Joe Biden

- John Backus (1924–2007) – computer scientist; invented Fortran and Backus–Naur form; raised in Wilmington
- Walter W. Bacon (1879–1962) – mayor of Wilmington; governor of Delaware
- L. Heisler Ball (1861–1932) – U.S. representative and U.S. senator from Delaware
- Samuel Bancroft (1840–1915) – industrialist; art philanthropist; born in Wilmington
- William Poole Bancroft (1835–1928) – industrialist; land conservationist
- Phineas Banning (1830–1885) – businessman and entrepreneur in Delaware and California
- Richard Bassett (1745–1815) – U.S. senator from Delaware; governor of Delaware
- Alice M. Batchelder (born 1944) – attorney; judge of the U.S. Court of Appeals for the Sixth Circuit
- Martin W. Bates (1786–1869) – state representative; U.S. senator from Delaware
- Alexis I. du Pont Bayard (1918–1985) – veteran, World War II; lieutenant governor of Delaware
- James A. Bayard Sr. (1767–1815) – U.S. representative; U.S. senator from Delaware
- James A. Bayard Jr. (1799–1880) – lawyer; U.S. senator from Delaware
- Richard H. Bayard (1796–1868) – chief justice, Delaware Supreme Court; U.S. senator from Delaware
- Thomas F. Bayard (1828–1898) – U.S. senator from Delaware; U.S. secretary of state
- Thomas F. Bayard Jr. (1868–1942) – U.S. senator from Delaware
- Gunning Bedford Sr. (1742–1797) – Revolutionary officer; governor of Delaware
- Gunning Bedford Jr. (1747–1812) – lawyer; Continental Congressman from Delaware
- Caleb P. Bennett (1758–1836) – Revolutionary officer; governor of Delaware
- Valerie Bertinelli (born 1960) – actress (One Day at a Time, Hot in Cleveland); born in Wilmington
- Huck Betts (1897–1987) – Major League Baseball player, born in Millsboro
- Mahlon Betts (1795–1867) – banker; transportation businessman
- Stephen Biddle (born 1959) – author; historian; policy analyst; columnist
- Beau Biden (1969–2015) – lawyer; attorney general of Delaware; son of Joe Biden
- Jill Biden (born 1951) – college professor; former First Lady of the United States
- Joe Biden (born 1942) – former president of the United States; former vice president of the United States (2009–2017); longtime senator from Delaware (1973–2009); (born in Scranton, PA)
- Benjamin T. Biggs (1821–1893) – U.S. representative; governor of Delaware
- John Biggs Jr. (1895–1979) – former chief judge of the 3rd Circuit U.S. Court of Appeals
- Clyde Bishop – U.S. ambassador to the Marshall Islands
- Emily Bissell (1861–1948) – anti-suffragist; introduced Christmas seals to the U.S.

Bn–Bz

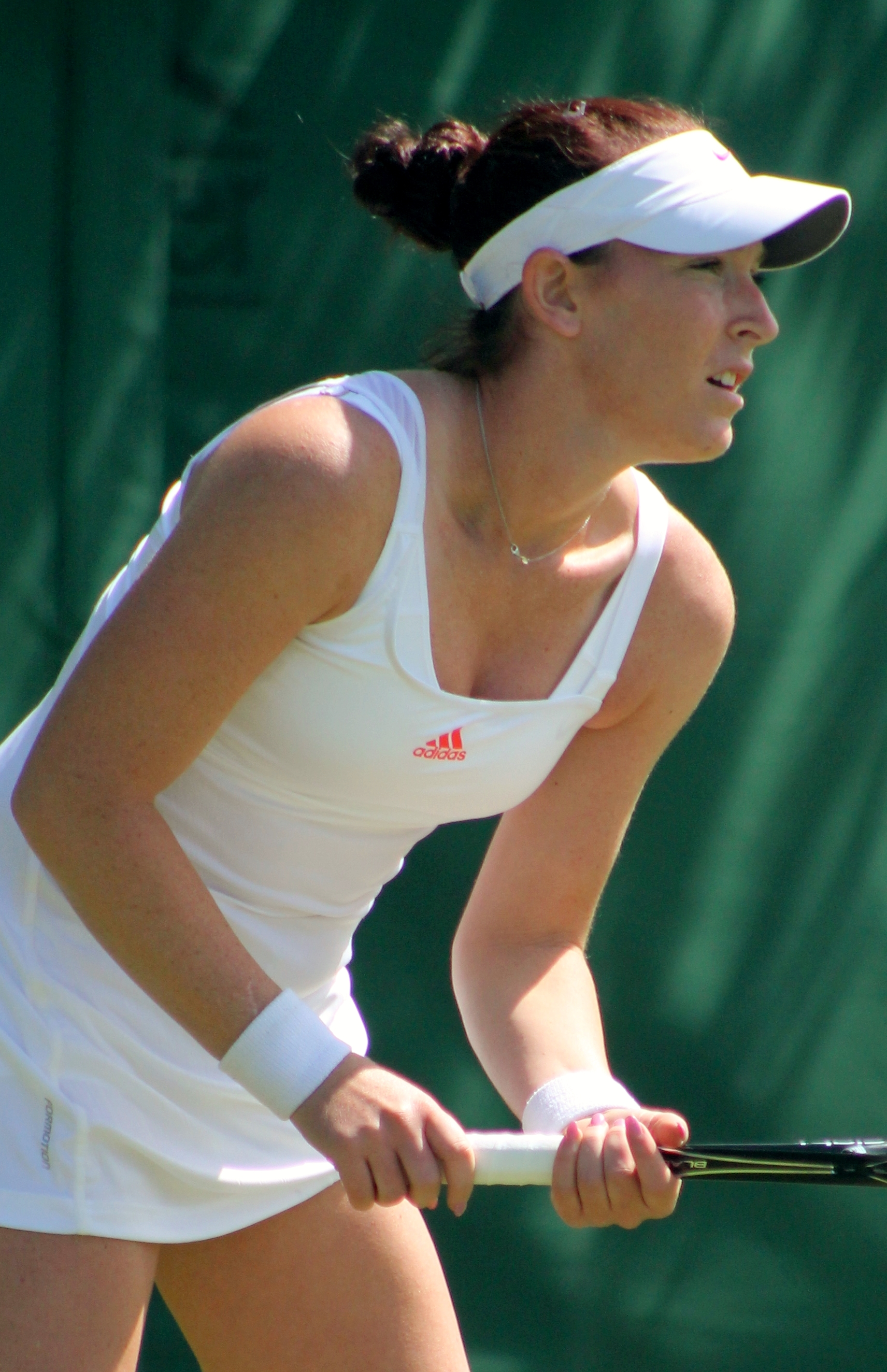
Madison Brengle

- J. Caleb Boggs (1909–1993) – governor of Delaware; U.S. senator from Delaware
- Cedella Booker (1926–2008) – singer; Jamaica native, lived in Delaware; mother of singer Bob Marley
- Nicole Bosso (born 1986) – Miss Delaware USA 2007
- William H. Boyce (1855–1942) – justice of the Superior Court; U.S. representative from Delaware
- John Walter Bratton (1867–1947) – Tin Pan Alley composer
- Madison Brengle (born 1990) – tennis player; 2007 Juniors Wimbledon runner-up
- Jay Briscoe (1984–2023) – professional wrestler; ROH World Champion and eight-time ROH World Tag Team Champion with his brother Mark Briscoe
- Mark Briscoe (born 1985) – professional wrestler; eight-time ROH World Tag Team Champion with brother Jay
- Dennis Brockenborough – trombone player
- Franklin Brockson (1865–1942) – state representative and U.S. representative from Delaware
- James M. Broom (1776–1850) – lawyer and U.S. representative from Delaware
- Hugh T. Broomall (born 1948) – major general, Delaware Air National Guard
- Clifford Brown (1930–1956) – jazz trumpeter, born in Wilmington
- C. Douglass Buck (1890–1965) – governor of Delaware; U.S. senator from Delaware
- David P. Buckson (1920–2017) – attorney general of Delaware; governor of Delaware
- Edward G. Budd (1870–1946) – automotive inventor; founder, Budd Company
- Colin Burns (born 1982) – professional soccer player in Norway
- Hiram R. Burton (1841–1927) – physician and U.S. representative from Delaware
- William Burton (1789–1866) – physician and governor of Delaware
- Randy Bush (born 1958) – MLB pitcher and executive; born in Dover
- William Sharp Bush (1786–1812) – U.S. Marine, recipient of silver medal, War of 1812; born in Wilmington

== C ==
Ca–Cm

- Henry Seidel Canby (1878–1961) – educator; editor, The Saturday Review of Literature
- Annie Jump Cannon (1863–1941) – pioneering female astronomer
- Philip L. Cannon (1850–1929) – lieutenant governor of Delaware
- William Cannon (1809–1865) – general assemblyman; governor of Delaware
- Joseph M. Carey (1845–1924) – Wyoming politician; born in Delaware
- Louis Carlet (born 1966) – union activist
- John Carney (born 1956) – U.S. representative for Delaware, governor of Delaware, current mayor of Wilmington
- Wallace Carothers (1896–1937) – chemist; inventor of neoprene and nylon
- Charles I. Carpenter (1906–1994) – major general; first chief of Chaplains of the U.S. Air Force
- R. R. M. Carpenter (1877–1949) – businessman; DuPont executive; owner, Philadelphia Phillies
- R. R. M. Carpenter Jr. (1915–1990) – owner, Philadelphia Phillies
- Ruly Carpenter (1940–2021) – former owner, Philadelphia Phillies
- Walter S. Carpenter Jr. (1888–1976) – businessman; oversaw construction of Manhattan Project facilities
- Thomas R. Carper (born 1947) – governor of Delaware; U.S. senator from Delaware
- Vincenza Carrieri-Russo – Miss Delaware USA 2008; second runner up, Miss United States 2014
- Elbert N. Carvel (1910–2005) – businessman; governor of Delaware
- Michael N. Castle (born 1939) – U.S. representative; governor of Delaware
- John W. Causey (1841–1908) – farmer; U.S. representative from Delaware
- Peter F. Causey (1801–1871) – general assemblyman; governor of Delaware
- John T. Chain Jr. (born 1934) – U.S. Air Force general; commander, Strategic Air Command
- Alfred D. Chandler Jr. (1918–2007) – business history professor, Harvard University; born in Guyencourt
- Thomas H. Chilton (1899–1972) – pioneer, modern chemical engineering; member, Manhattan Project
- Uma Chowdhry (born 1947) – scientist
- Anne Rogers Clark (1929–2006) – dog breeder and trainer
- John Clark (1761–1821) – general assemblyman; governor of Delaware
- John M. Clayton (1796–1856) – U.S. senator from Delaware; U.S. secretary of state
- Joshua Clayton (1744–1798) – governor of Delaware; U.S. senator from Delaware
- Thomas Clayton (1777–1854) – chief justice; U.S. senator from Delaware

Cn–Cz

- John P. Cochran (1809–1898) – farmer; governor of Delaware
- Ashley Coleman (born 1981) – Miss Teen USA 1999
- John Collins (1776–1822) – manufacturer; governor of Delaware
- Thomas Collins (1732–1789) – general assemblymann; president of Delaware
- Cornelius P. Comegys (1780–1851) – general assemblyman; governor of Delaware
- Joseph P. Comegys (1813–1893) – U.S. senator from Delaware; chief justice of Delaware
- John Cook (1730–1789) – general assemblyman; governor of Delaware
- Charles "Tarzan" Cooper (1907–1980) – Philadelphia professional basketball player
- Thomas Cooper (1764–1829) – general assemblyman; U.S. representative from Delaware
- William B. Cooper (1777–1849) – general assemblyman and U.S. representative from Delaware
- Lammot du Pont Copeland (1905–1983) – president, DuPont (1962–1967); co-founder, Population Action International
- Louise E. du Pont Crowninshield (1877–1958) – philanthropist; preservationist; founding trustee, National Trust for Historic Preservation
- Robert Crumb (born 1943) – artist; illustrator; lived in Milford and Dover
- Elisha D. Cullen (1799–1862) – lawyer; U.S. representative from Delaware
- Nancy Currie (born 1958) – astronaut, born in Wilmington

== D ==
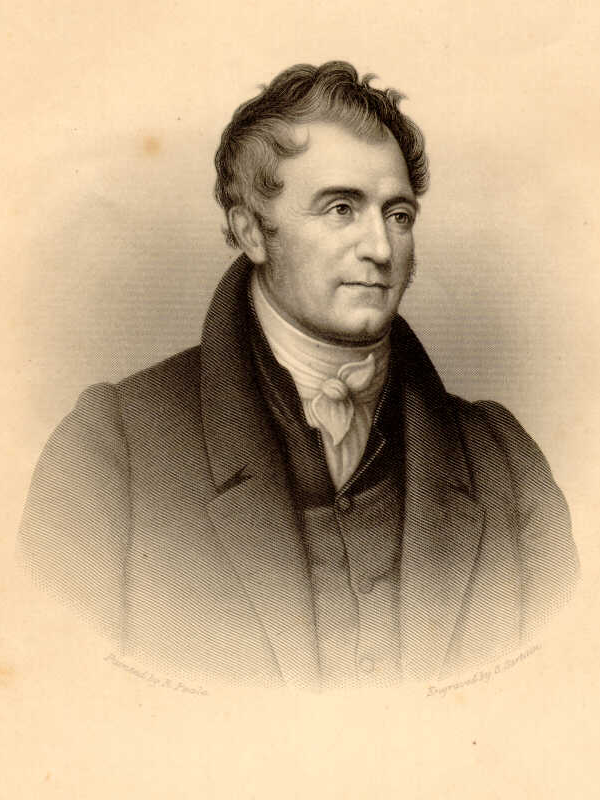
Éleuthère Irénée du Pont

- Carl C. Danberg (born 1964) – lawyer; Attorney General of Delaware
- F. O. C. Darley (1822–1888) – painter; illustrator
- Samuel Davies (1723–1761) – writer, preacher, 4th president of Princeton University
- Jehu Davis (1738–1802) – general assemblyman; president of Delaware
- Elena Delle Donne (born 1989) – Women's National Basketball Association player
- Matthew P. Denn (born 1966) – insurance commissioner; lieutenant governor of Delaware
- William D. Denney (1873–1953) – general assemblyman; governor of Delaware
- Delino DeShields (born 1969) – Major League Baseball player; born in Delaware
- John Dickinson (1732–1808) – president of Delaware; president of Pennsylvania
- Mary Norris Dickinson (1740–1803) – owner of one of the largest libraries in colonial America
- Philemon Dickinson (1739–1809) – Continental Congressman from Delaware; U.S. senator from New Jersey
- Donte DiVincenzo (born 1997) – National Basketball Association shooting guard for the Milwaukee Bucks
- John Dossett – actor; singer
- Dave Douglas (1918–1978) – professional golfer (1940s and 1950s)
- A. Felix du Pont Jr. (1905–1996) – aviator; co-founder, predecessor of US Airways
- Alfred I. du Pont (1864–1935) – businessman; philanthropist; established the Nemours Foundation
- Alfred V. du Pont (1798–1856) – head of the DuPont Company (1837–1850)
- Charles I. du Pont (1797–1869) – manufacturer; Delaware General Assemblyman
- E. Paul du Pont (1887–1950) – founder, Du Pont Motors; president, Indian Motocycle Manufacturing Company
- Éleuthère Irénée du Pont (1771–1834) – founder, DuPont Company
- Eugene du Pont (1840–1902) – head of the DuPont Company (1889–1902)
- Henry du Pont (1812–1889) – head of the DuPont Company; major general, American Civil War
- Henry A. du Pont (1838–1926) – veteran, American Civil War; U.S. senator from Delaware
- Henry Francis du Pont (1880–1969) – art collector; established the Winterthur Museum, Garden and Library
- Irénée du Pont (1876–1963) – president, DuPont Company (1919–1926)
- Lammot du Pont I (1831–1884) – scientist; inventor; soldier, American Civil War
- Lammot du Pont II (1880–1952) – president, DuPont Company (1926–1940)
- Pierre S. du Pont (1870–1954) – inventor; president, DuPont Company and General Motors
- Pierre S. du Pont IV (1935–2021) – U.S. representative; governor of Delaware
- Pierre Samuel du Pont de Nemours (1739–1817) – helped negotiate the 1783 Treaty of Paris and the Louisiana Purchase
- Richard C. du Pont (1911–1943) – aviator, co-founder, All American Aviation, the forerunner of US Airways
- Samuel Francis Du Pont (1803–1865) – rear admiral, United States Navy
- T. Coleman du Pont (1863–1930) – president, DuPont Company; U.S. senator from Delaware
- Victor Marie du Pont (1767–1827) – manufacturer; Delaware general assemblyman
- Sara Dylan (born 1939) – first wife of Bob Dylan; born in Delaware

== E ==
- Mark Eaton (born 1977) – professional ice hockey player; born in Delaware
- Richard H. Ellis (1919–1989) – general; commander in chief, Strategic Air Command; from Delaware
- Raúl Esparza (born 1970) – actor, born in Delaware
- Oliver Evans (1755–1819) – inventor, born in Delaware
- Thomas B. Evans Jr. (born 1931) – lawyer; U.S. representative from Delaware

== F ==
- George P. Fisher (1817–1899) – U.S. representative from Delaware; justice of District Court
- William H. Forwood (1838–1915) – 19th Surgeon General of the United States Army
- Wayne Franklin (born 1974) – professional baseball player; born in Wilmington
- J. Allen Frear Jr. (1903–1993) – veteran, World War II; U.S. senator from Delaware
- Louis Freeh (born 1950) – fifth director, Federal Bureau of Investigation; lives in Wilmington
- Yvette Freeman (born 1957) – actress; born in Wilmington

== G ==
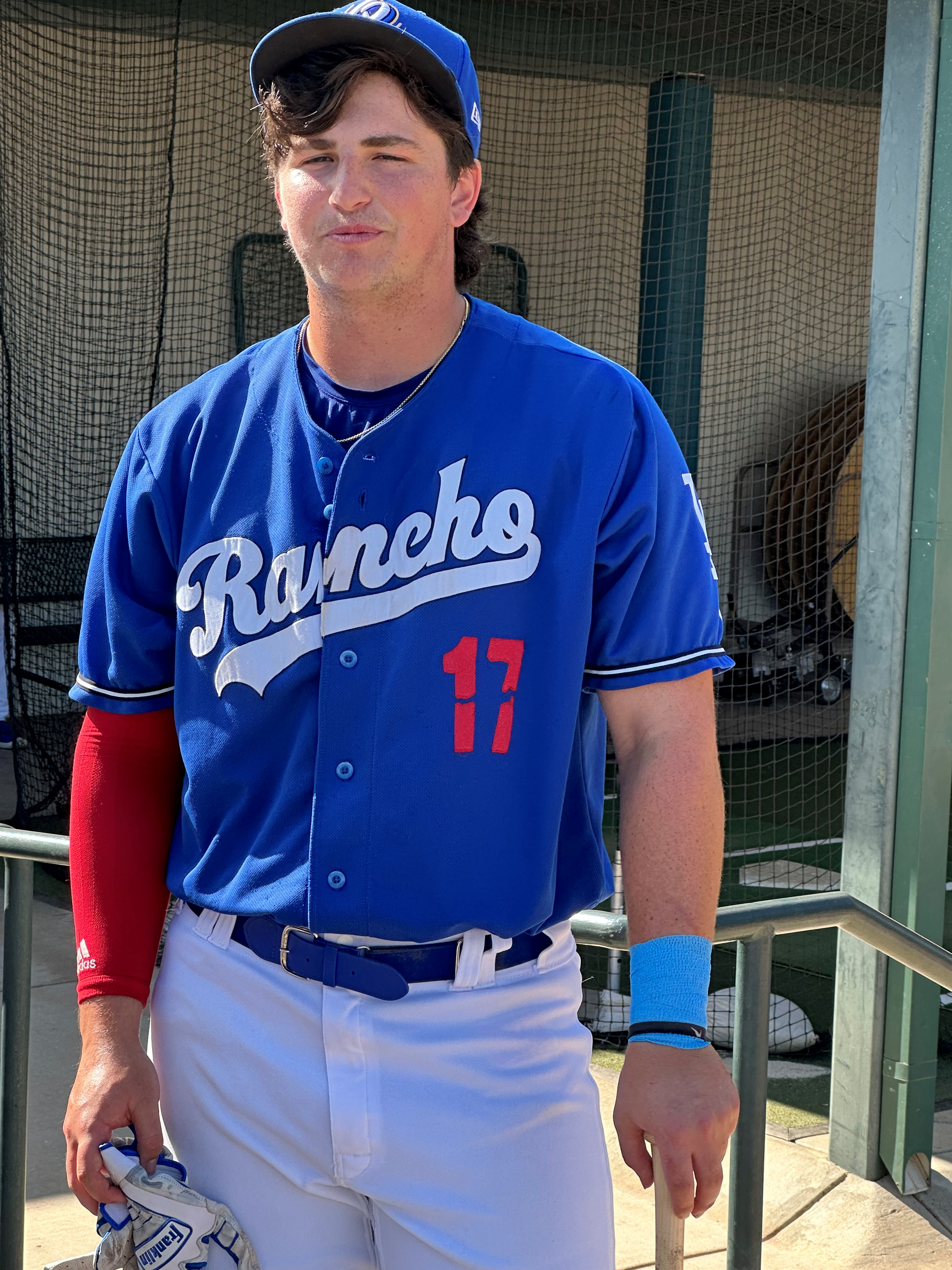
Jake Gelof

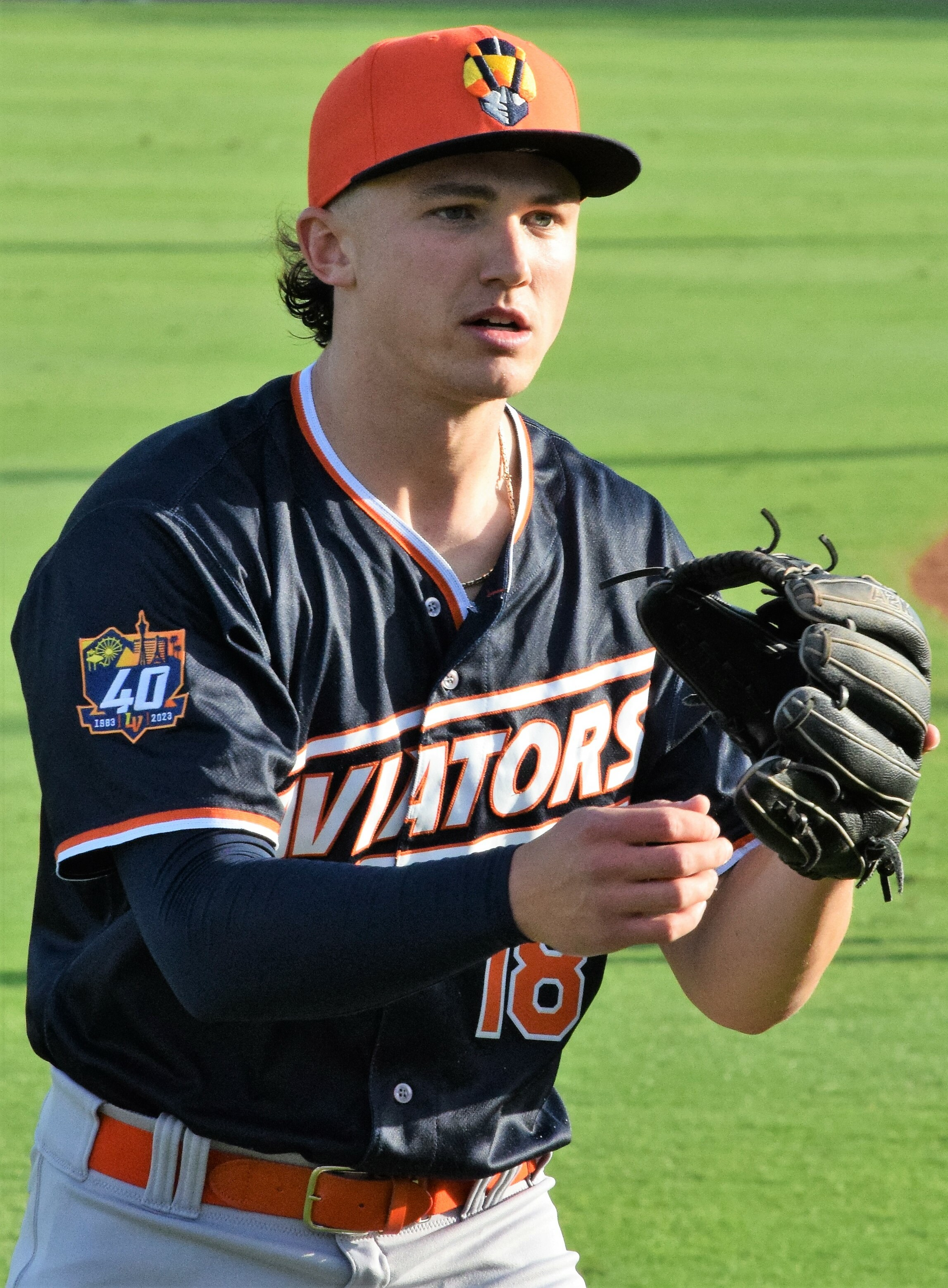
Zack Gelof

- Chris Gutierrez (born 1992) – actor
- John Gallagher Jr. (born 1984) – actor; musician
- Thomas Garrett (1789–1871) – abolitionist; leader in the Underground Railroad
- Jake Gelof (born 2002) – baseball third baseman
- Zack Gelof (born 1999) – baseball second baseman for the Oakland A's
- Michael Gibson (1944–2005) – Broadway trombonist and musical arranger; born in Wilmington
- Commodore John P. Gillis (1803–1873) – officer, United States Navy, born in Wilmington
- Paul Goldschmidt (born 1987) – first baseman for New York Yankees, born in Wilmington
- Bill Gore (1912–1986) – scientist, founder of W. L. Gore and Associates
- Robert W. Gore (1937–2020) – businessman; inventor of Gore-Tex; lived in Newark
- Annie Ryder Gracey (1836–1908) – writer, missionary; born in Christiana
- Joseph (Joey) Graham (born 1982) – former professional basketball player; now coach; born in Wilmington
- Stephen Graham (born 1982) – professional basketball player; born in Wilmington
- George Gray (1840–1925) – judge of U.S. Court of Appeals; U.S. senator from Delaware
- Dallas Green (1934–2017) – pitcher, manager, and executive in Major League Baseball; born in Newport
- Crawford Hallock Greenewalt (1902–1993) – president, DuPont Company and the American Philosophical Society
- Crawford Hallock Greenewalt Jr. (1937–2012) – archaeologist

== H ==
- David Hall (1752–1817) – Continental Army officer; governor of Delaware
- John W. Hall (1817–1893) – general assemblyman; governor of Delaware
- Willard Hall (1780–1875) – U.S. representative; justice for the United States District Court
- L. Irving Handy (1861–1922) – educator; U.S. representative from Delaware
- Duron Harmon (born 1991) – professional football player; born in Magnolia
- Kwame Harris (born 1982) – professional football player; lived and went to high school in Newark
- Orien Harris (born 1983) – professional football player; lived and went to high school in Newark
- Harry G. Haskell Jr. (1921–2020) – businessman; U.S. representative from Delaware
- John Haslet (c. 1727–1777) – soldier, American Revolutionary War; from Milford
- Joseph Haslet (1769–1823) – farmer; governor of Delaware
- Daniel O. Hastings (1874–1966) – lawyer; U.S. senator from Delaware
- David Hazzard (1781–1864) – associate justice; governor of Delaware
- Walt Hazzard (1942–2011) – college, Olympic and professional basketball player; college basketball coach; born in Wilmington
- William H. Heald (1864–1939) – lawyer; U.S. representative from Delaware
- Henry Heimlich (1920–2016) – physician; inventor, Heimlich Maneuver; born in Wilmington
- Anthony Higgins (1840–1912) – lawyer; U.S. senator from Delaware
- John H. Hoffecker (1827–1900) – engineer; U.S. representative from Delaware
- Walter O. Hoffecker (1854–1934) – businessman; U.S. representative from Delaware
- General Thomas Holcomb (1879–1965) – 17th commandant of the U.S. Marine Corps; born in New Castle
- Outerbridge Horsey (1777–1842) – General Assembly; U.S. senator from Delaware
- Cisco Houston (1918–1961) – folk singer; closely associated with Woody Guthrie; born in Wilmington
- Henry A. Houston (1847–1925) – businessman; U.S. representative from Delaware
- John W. Houston (1814–1896) – U.S. representative; justice, Delaware Superior Court
- Robert G. Houston (1867–1946) – lawyer; U.S. representative from Delaware
- Richard Howell (1754–1802) – 3rd governor of New Jersey; born in Newark
- James H. Hughes (1867–1953) – lawyer; U.S. senator from Delaware
- John Hunn (1818–1894) – farmer; abolitionist; from Odessa
- John Hunn (1849–1926) – businessman; governor of Delaware
- Morgan Hurd (born 2001) – artistic gymnast; world gold medalist; hometown Middletown
- Doug Hutchison (born 1960) – actor; born in Dover

== J ==
- John Johns (1796–1876) – college president; bishop; brother of Kensey Johns Jr.
- Kensey Johns Jr. (1791–1857) – U.S. representative and chancellor of Delaware; brother of John Johns
- Eldridge R. Johnson (1867–1945) – co-creator, Victor Talking Machine Company; born in Wilmington
- Judy Johnson (1899–1989) – Negro league baseball player; National Baseball Hall of Famer; lived and died in Wilmington
- Absalom Jones (1746–1818) – abolitionist; minister
- Commodore Jacob Jones (1768–1850) – officer, U.S. Navy; born near Smyrna
- Kent A. Jordan (born 1957) – judge, U.S. Court of Appeals

== K ==
- Dorothy Andrews Elston Kabis (1917–1971) – Treasurer of the United States; lived in Middletown
- Edward E. Kaufman (born 1939) – U.S. senator from Delaware
- Dyre Kearney (died 1791) – lawyer; delegate, Continental Congress from Delaware
- Pat Kenney (born 1968) – professional wrestler (stage name: Simon Diamond); born in Wilmington
- Richard R. Kenney (1856–1931) – lawyer; U.S. senator from Delaware
- Patrick Kerr (born 1956) – television actor; born in Wilmington
- Muqtedar Khan (born 1966) – Islamic intellectual; professor, University of Delaware
- Robert Kirkwood (1746–1791) – officer, American Revolutionary War
- Horace G. Knowles (1863–1937) – diplomat (U.S. ambassador to Bolivia, Bulgaria, the Dominican Republic, Romania, Serbia); served under three different U.S. presidents
- Arturs Krišjānis Kariņš (born 1964) – former prime minister of Latvia
- Ellen J. Kullman (born 1956) – president and chief executive officer, DuPont Company
- Stephanie Kwolek (1923–2014) – scientist; inventor, Kevlar

== L ==
- Henry Latimer (1752–1819) – U.S. representative; U.S. senator from Delaware
- Caleb R. Layton (1851–1930) – physician; U.S. representative from Delaware
- Daniel J. Layton (1879–1960) – chief justice; attorney general of Delaware
- Isaac Lea (1792–1886) – conchologist; geologist; businessman; born in Wilmington
- Preston Lea (1841–1916) – businessman; governor of Delaware
- Judith LeClair (born 1958) – bassoonist, New York Philharmonic; faculty, Juilliard School; from Newark
- Jennifer Leigh (also known as Jennicide) (born 1983) – professional poker player; Playboy model; born in Wilmington
- Warren K. Lewis (1882–1975) – chemical engineer; professor, Massachusetts Institute of Technology
- John Bernard "Hans" Lobert (1881–1968) – Major League Baseball player, coach, manager and scout; born in Wilmington
- Henry Hayes Lockwood (1814–1899) – co-founder, U.S. Naval Academy; brigadier general, American Civil War
- James R. Lofland (1823–1894) – lawyer; U.S. representative from Delaware
- Edward L. Loper Sr. (1916–2011) – impressionist and colorist artist; from Wilmington
- Charles B. Lore (1831–1911) – lawyer; U.S. representative from Delaware

== M ==
- John Mabry (born 1970) – professional baseball player; born in Wilmington
- Isaac J. MacCollum (1889–1968) – physician; lieutenant governor of Delaware
- Thomas MacDonough (1783–1825) – commodore, U.S. Navy; victor, Battle of Lake Champlain in the War of 1812
- Jack A. Markell (born 1960) – state treasurer; governor of Delaware
- Edward L. Martin (1837–1897) – lawyer; U.S. representative from Delaware
- Joshua H. Marvil (1825–1895) – merchant; governor of Delaware
- Joseph Maull (1781–1846) – general assemblyman; governor of Delaware
- Dave May (1943–2012) – professional baseball player; born in New Castle
- Sarah McBride (born 1990) – transgender rights activist; U.S. representative from Delaware
- Thomas M'Clintock (1792–1876) – abolitionist; women's rights activist
- Eleazer McComb (1740–1798) – Continental soldier; Continental Congressman from Delaware
- Harris B. McDowell Jr. (1906–1988) – general assemblyman; U.S. representative from Delaware
- James D. McGinnis (1932–2009) – realtor; lieutenant governor of Delaware
- Bill McGowan (1896–1954) – Baseball Hall of Fame umpire; born in Wilmington
- Bernie McInerney (born 1936) – actor; born in Wilmington
- Thomas McKean (1734–1817) – chief justice; governor of Pennsylvania; educated in Delaware
- Thomas McKean Thompson McKennan (1794–1852) – 2nd U.S. secretary of the interior
- John McKinly (1721–1796) – general assemblyman; president of Delaware
- Marshall Kirk McKusick (born 1954) – computer scientist
- Louis McLane (1786–1857) – U.S. representative from Delaware; U.S. secretary of the treasury; U.S. secretary of state; father of Robert Milligan McLane; born in Smyrna
- Robert Milligan McLane (1815–1898) – diplomat (U.S. ambassador to Mexico, France and China; governor of Maryland); son of Louis McLane; born in Wilmington
- Richard C. McMullen (1868–1944) – manufacturer; governor of Delaware
- William Medill (1802–1865) – governor of Ohio; Commissioner of Indian Affairs; Comptroller of the Treasury (U.S.)
- Kevin Mench (born 1978) – professional baseball player, born in Wilmington
- Charles R. Miller (1857–1927) – general assemblyman; governor of Delaware
- Thomas W. Miller (1886–1973) – lawyer; U.S. representative from Delaware
- Henry Milligan (born 1958) – AAU boxing champion (1983)
- John J. Milligan (1795–1875) – lawyer; U.S. representative from Delaware
- David L. Mills (born 1938) – computer engineer; Internet pioneer
- Ruth Ann Minner (1935–2021) – lieutenant governor and governor of Delaware
- Nathaniel Mitchell (1753–1815) – Continental Congressman; governor of Delaware
- Roxanne Modafferi (born 1982) – mixed martial artist, born in Wilmington
- Henry Molleston (1762–1819) – general assemblyman; governor of Delaware
- Hugh Montgomery (died 1780) – sea captain, raised the first American flag in a foreign port
- Jacob Moore – attorney general of Delaware
- John Bassett Moore (1860–1947) – member, Permanent Court of Arbitration (also known as the Hague Tribunal); first American judge, International Court of Justice (also known as the World Court)
- Vinnie Moore (born 1964) – musician, born in New Castle
- Morgan Morgan (1688–1766) – pioneer
- Hugh M. Morris – federal judge
- John Morris (born 1941) – MLB pitcher, born in Lewes

== N ==
- Daniel Nathans (1928–1999) – microbiologist; recipient, 1978 Nobel Prize in Physiology or Medicine
- Arnold Naudain (1790–1892) – general assemblyman; U.S. senator from Delaware
- Garrett Neff (born 1984) – fashion model
- Alice Dunbar Nelson (1875–1935) – poet; journalist; anti-lynching activist
- David M. Nelson (1920–1991) – football coach; College Football Hall of Famer
- John A. Nicholson (1827–1906) – lawyer; U.S. representative from Delaware

== O ==
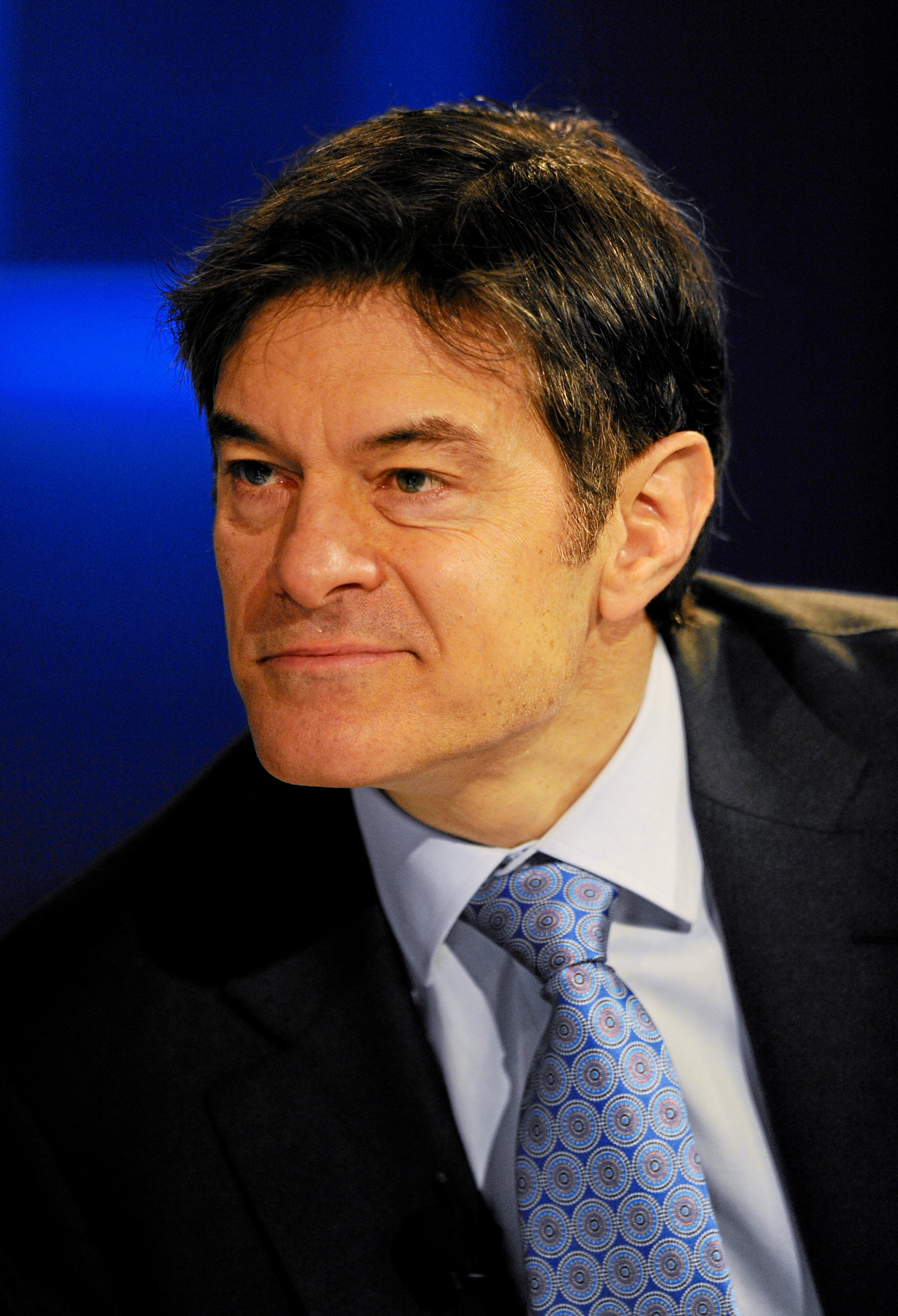
Mehmet Oz

- Alfie Oakes (born 1968) – farmer and businessman; born in Delaware City
- Brett Oberholtzer – baseball pitcher, Houston Astros; born in Christiana
- Charles Oberly (born 1946) – attorney; born in Wilmington
- John W. O'Daniel – general, U.S. Army; commander, 3rd Infantry Division during World War II
- Christine O'Donnell (born 1969) – Republican candidate, U.S. Senate (2006, 2008 and 2010)
- Brian O'Neill (born 1995) – NFL offensive lineman; born in Wilmington
- Shane O'Neill (born 1972) – tattoo artist, season one winner of Ink Master; born in Middletown
- Kirk Olivadotti (born 1974) – NFL coach; born in Wilmington
- Ed Oliver (1915–1961) – professional golfer; born in Wilmington
- Jeff Otah (born 1986) – former NFL offensive lineman; attended William Penn High School
- William Outten (1948–2020) – member of the Delaware House of Representatives; born in Milford
- Montell Owens – professional football player; born in Wilmington
- Mehmet Oz – surgeon; television personality; attended Tower Hill School

== P ==
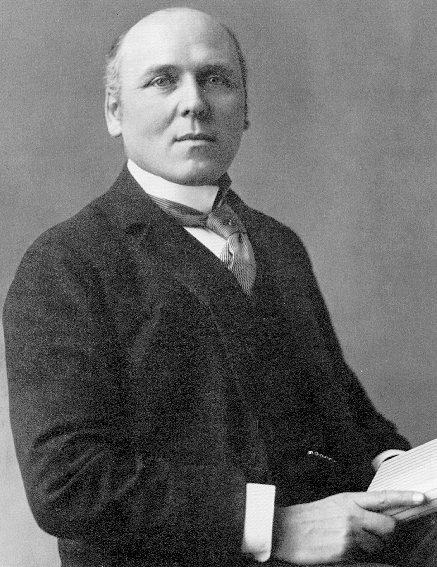
Howard Pyle

- William Jackson Palmer (1836–1909) – general, American Civil War; railroad developer; philanthropist; born in Leipsic
- Rudolph Pariser (1923–2021) – scientist; formulator, Pariser–Parr–Pople method
- George Parshall (1929–2019) – scientist; chemical weapons destruction activist
- John Patten (1725–1754) – fur trader and cartographer who made early maps of Ohio
- John Patten (1746–1800) – general assemblyman; U.S. representative from Delaware
- Samuel Paynter (1768–1845) – general assemblyman; governor of Delaware
- Charles J. Pedersen (1904–1989) – co-recipient, 1987 Nobel Prize in Chemistry; lived in Delaware (1927–1969)
- William Peery (1743–1800) – general assemblyman; Continental Congressman from Delaware
- John B. Penington (1825–1902) – attorney general of Delaware; U.S. representative from Delaware
- Simeon S. Pennewill (1867–1935) – general assemblyman; governor of Delaware
- Arthur Perry (born 1946) – basketball player and coach
- Russell W. Peterson (1916–2011) – scientist; governor of Delaware; chairman, White House Council on Environmental Quality; president, National Audubon Society
- Daniel Pfeiffer (born 1975) – senior advisor to the President under U.S. President Barack Obama
- Ryan Phillippe (born 1974) – actor; born in New Castle
- Aubrey Plaza (born 1984) – actress; comedian; April Ludgate on Parks and Recreation
- David Plouffe (born 1967) – senior advisor to the President under U.S. President Barack Obama; born in Wilmington
- Albert F. Polk (1869–1955) – lawyer; U.S. representative from Delaware
- Charles Polk Jr. (1788–1857) – general assemblyman; governor of Delaware
- Teri Polo (born 1969) – actress; born in Dover
- James Ponder (1819–1897) – general assemblyman; governor of Delaware
- William Poole (born 1937) – member, Council of Economic Advisers; chief executive, Federal Reserve Bank of St. Louis
- Bill Press (born 1940) – talk radio host; liberal commentator; author; raised in Delaware City
- Ellen Bernard Thompson Pyle (1876–1936) – illustrator of covers for The Saturday Evening Post; student and sister-in-law of Howard Pyle
- Howard Pyle (1853–1911) – illustrator; author; founder, Brandywine School, brother-in-law of Ellen Bernard Thompson Pyle
- Katharine Pyle (1863–1938) – illustrator; author
- Joe Pyne – broadcaster, worked in Delaware

== R ==
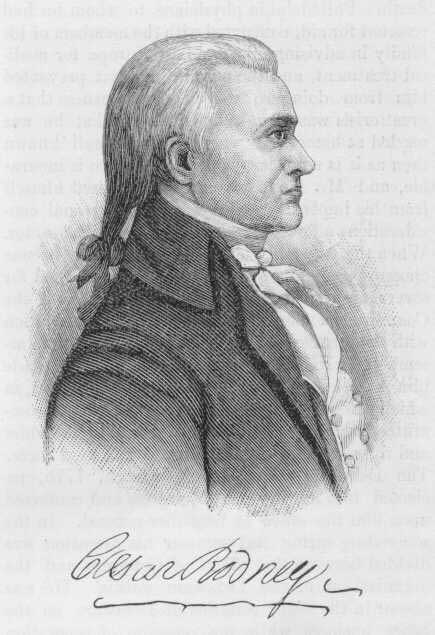
Caesar Rodney

- John J. Raskob (1879–1950) – businessman; builder, Empire State Building
- Harold R. "Tubby" Raymond (1926–2017) – University of Delaware football coach; College Football Hall of Famer
- George Read (1733–1798) – U.S. senator from Delaware; chief justice of Delaware
- George Read Jr. (1765–1836) – U.S. attorney, U.S. District Court for the District of Delaware; built the Read House and Gardens
- Thomas Read (1740–1788) – first commodore, Continental Navy
- Louis L. Redding (1901–1998) – civil rights attorney; participant, Brown v. Board of Education case
- Judge Reinhold (born 1957) – actor; born in Wilmington
- Eugene Reybold (1884–1961) – chief of Engineers, U.S. Army Corps of Engineers during World War II
- Robert J. Reynolds (1838–1909) – general assemblyman; governor of Delaware
- Harry A. Richardson (1853–1928) – businessman; U.S. senator from Delaware
- John E. Rickards (1848–1927) – 2nd governor of Montana; born in Delaware City
- George R. Riddle (1817–1867) – U.S. representative; U.S. senator from Delaware
- Henry M. Ridgely (1779–1847) – U.S. representative; U.S. senator from Delaware
- Robert P. Robinson (1869–1939) – banker; governor of Delaware
- Thomas Robinson Jr. (1800–1843) – lawyer; U.S. representative from Delaware
- Caesar Rodney (1728–1784) – Continental Congressman; president of Delaware
- Caesar A. Rodney (1772–1824) – U.S. senator from Delaware; U.S. Attorney General
- Caleb Rodney (1767–1840) – general assemblyman; governor of Delaware
- Daniel Rodney (1764–1846) – governor of Delaware; U.S. senator from Delaware
- George B. Rodney (1803–1883) – lawyer; U.S. representative from Delaware
- Thomas Rodney (1744–1811) – general assemblyman; Continental Congressman from Delaware
- Daniel Rogers (1754–1806) – general assemblyman; governor of Delaware
- John W. Rollins (1916–2000) – businessman; lieutenant governor of Delaware
- David Roselle (1939–2024) – mathematician; academic administrator
- George Ross (1730–1779) – represented Pennsylvania in the Continental Congress
- William H. H. Ross (1814–1887) – farmer; governor of Delaware
- Jane Richards Roth (born 1935) – judge, U.S. Court of Appeals
- William V. Roth Jr. (1923–2003) – U.S. representative; U.S. senator from Delaware; namesake of Roth IRA and the Roth 401(k) retirement savings plans
- Cynthia Rothrock (born 1957) – martial artist; actress; born in Wilmington

== S ==
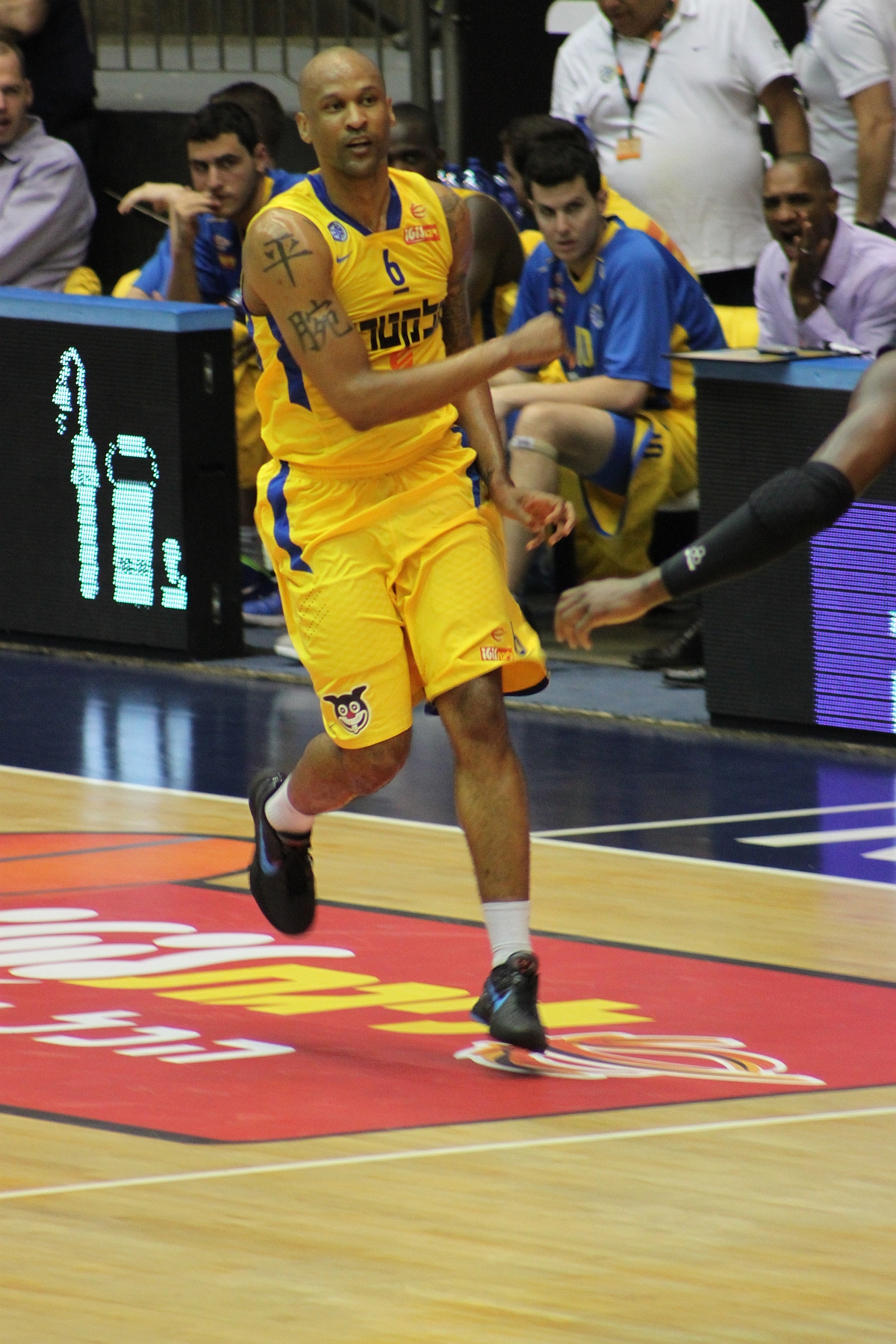
Devin Smith

Sa–Sn

- Eli Saulsbury (1817–1893) – general assemblyman; U.S. senator from Delaware
- Gove Saulsbury (1815–1881) – general assemblyman; governor of Delaware
- Willard Saulsbury Sr. (1820–1892) – chancellor of Delaware; U.S. senator from Delaware
- Willard Saulsbury Jr. (1861–1927) – lawyer; U.S. senator from Delaware
- Frank Schoonover (1877–1972) – illustrator, Brandywine School
- Marion duPont Scott (1894–1983) – preservationist; last private owner of Montpelier, the mansion and land estate of former U.S. President James Madison; born in Wilmington
- Collins J. Seitz (1914–1998) – judge, U.S. Court of Appeals; presided over Gebhart v. Belton case
- Virginia A. Seitz (born 1956) – U.S. Assistant Attorney General, Office of Legal Counsel
- Frederic Kimber Seward (1878–1943) – corporate attorney; survivor, RMS Titanic
- Mary Ann Shadd (1823–1893) – educator; newspaper publisher; abolitionist; suffragist; born in Wilmington
- Dave Sheridan (born 1969) – actor, born in Newark
- Chris Short – Major League Baseball player, born in Milford
- Andrew Shue (born 1967) – actor; born in Wilmington
- Elisabeth Shue (born 1963) – actress; born in Wilmington
- Helen Farr Sloan (1911–2005) – art philanthropist; former wife of John French Sloan
- Melanie Sloan – executive director, Citizens for Responsibility and Ethics in Washington
- Devin Smith – professional basketball player, Maccabi Tel Aviv
- Nathaniel B. Smithers (1818–1896) – lawyer; U.S. representative from Delaware
- Thomas Alfred Smyth – last Union Army general killed in the American Civil War

Sn–Sz

- Ian Snell (born 1981) – Major League Baseball player; born in Dover
- Peter Spencer (1782–1843) – founder, A.U.M.P. Church
- Presley Spruance (1785–1863) – general assemblyman; U.S. senator from Delaware
- E. R. Squibb (1819–1900) – pharmaceutical inventor; founder, E. R. Squibb and Sons, a forerunner of Bristol-Myers Squibb
- W. Laird Stabler Jr. (1930–2008) – lawyer; attorney general of Delaware
- Walter King Stapleton (born 1934) – judge, U.S. Court of Appeals
- J. George Stewart (1890–1970) – architect; U.S. representative from Delaware
- Michael Stewart (born 1977) – professional boxer, lived in New Castle
- Charles C. Stockley (1819–1901) – general assemblyman; governor of Delaware
- Thomas Stockton (1781–1846) – soldier; governor of Delaware
- Jacob Stout (1764–1857) – general assemblyman; governor of Delaware
- Susan Stroman (born 1954) – choreographer; director; born in Wilmington
- George Sykes (1822–1880) – major general, American Civil War
- James Sykes (1725–1792) – general assemblyman; Continental Congressman
- James Sykes (1761–1822) – general assemblyman; governor of Delaware
- Timothy Szymanski (born 1964) – vice admiral, U.S. Navy SEAL

== T ==
- William Temple (1814–1863) – governor of Delaware; U.S. representative from Delaware
- Charles L. Terry Jr. (1900–1970) – chief justice; governor of Delaware
- William Tharp (1803–1865) – general assemblyman; governor of Delaware
- Charles Thomas (1790–1848) – general assemblyman; governor of Delaware
- Lorenzo Thomas (1804–1875) – adjutant general, U.S. Army; acting U.S. secretary of war
- Sean Patrick Thomas (born 1970) – actor; born in Wilmington
- Jim Thompson (1906–1967) – businessman; born in Greenville
- George Thorogood (born 1950) – blues-rock musician; from Wilmington
- James Tilton (1745–1822) – 7th Surgeon General of the United States Army; delegate, Continental Congress; from Dover
- Alfred Thomas Archimedes Torbert (1833–1880) – general, Union Army; diplomat; born in Georgetown
- Reorus Torkillus (1608–1643) – first Swedish Lutheran minister to New Sweden
- Jeff Townes, also known as DJ Jazzy Jeff (born 1965) – hip hop, R&B disc jockey; record producer; turntablist; actor; has lived in Delaware since 2004
- John G. Townsend Jr. (1871–1964) – governor of Delaware; U.S. senator from Delaware
- Philip A. Traynor (1874–1962) – dentist, U.S. representative from Delaware; born in Wilmington
- Sherman W. Tribbitt (1922–2010) – lieutenant governor of Delaware; governor of Delaware
- George Truitt (1756–1818) – general assemblyman; governor of Delaware
- Ebe W. Tunnell (1844–1917) – general assemblyman; governor of Delaware
- James M. Tunnell (1879–1957) – lawyer; U.S. senator from Delaware

== V ==
- Nicholas Van Dyke (1738–1789) – Continental Congressman; president of Delaware
- Nicholas Van Dyke (1770–1826) – U.S. representative; U.S. senator from Delaware
- James C. Van Sice – rear admiral, U.S. Coast Guard; born in Wilmington
- Francis D. Vavala (born 1947) – major general, Army National Guard; adjutant general, Delaware National Guard
- Tom Verlaine – musician
- Mabel Vernon (1883–1975) – leader, women's suffrage movement (1910s); born in Wilmington
- John M. Vining (1758–1802) – U.S. representative; U.S. senator from Delaware

== W ==
- John Wales (1783–1863) – lawyer; U.S. senator from Delaware
- Herbert B. Warburton (1916–1983) – lawyer; U.S. representative from Delaware
- Herta Ware (1917–2005) – actress; political activist; born in Wilmington
- William T. Watson (1849–1917) – general assemblyman; governor of Delaware
- Dave Weigel – journalist, born in Wilmington
- Johnny Weir (born 1984) – figure skater; three-time U.S. national champion; lived in Newark
- William H. Wells (1769–1829) – general assemblyman; U.S. senator from Delaware
- Joey Wendle (born 1990) – second baseman for the Tampa Bay Rays
- George Alexis Weymouth (1936–2016) – painter; land conservationist; founder, Brandywine River Museum; born in Wilmington
- Samuel Wharton (1732–1800) – merchant; Continental Congressman
- John P. Wheeler III (1944–2010) – government official; chair, Vietnam Veterans Memorial Fund
- William G. Whiteley (1819–1886) – mayor of Wilmington; U.S. representative from Delaware
- Randy White – Pro Football Hall of Famer; attended high school in Delaware
- Samuel White (1770–1809) – lawyer; U.S. senator from Delaware
- Kathleen Widdoes (born 1939) – actress; born in Wilmington
- Earle D. Willey (1889–1950) – lawyer; U.S. representative from Delaware
- George S. Williams (1877–1961) – businessman; U.S. representative from Delaware
- James Williams (1825–1899) – general assemblyman; U.S. representative from Delaware
- John J. Williams (1904–1988) – businessman; U.S. senator from Delaware
- Jonathan S. Willis (1830–1903) – minister; U.S. representative from Delaware
- James H. Wilson (1837–1925) – major general, American Civil War (captured Jefferson Davis and Henry Wirz)
- Josiah O. Wolcott (1877–1938) – U.S. senator from Delaware; chancellor of Delaware
- Dale E. Wolf (1924–2021) – lieutenant governor of Delaware; governor of Delaware
- Shien Biau Woo (born 1937) – professor; lieutenant governor of Delaware
- Daniel Woodall (1841–1880) – brigadier general, American Civil War
- Victor Baynard Woolley (1867–1945) – judge, U.S. Court of Appeals
- Paul Worrilow (born 1990) – professional football player; born in Wilmington
- Thomas Wynne (1627–1691) – physician; justice, Sussex County (1687–1691)

== Y ==
- Cori Yarckin (born 1982) – actress; singer; born in Seaford

== Z ==
- Aleksandra Ziolkowska-Boehm (born 1949) – writer; of Polish origin; lives in Wilmington

== See also ==
Federal government

- Delaware's congressional delegations
  - List of United States representatives from Delaware
  - List of United States senators from Delaware

State and local government

- List of Delaware state senators
- List of governors of Delaware
- List of justices of the Delaware Supreme Court
- List of lieutenant governors of Delaware
- List of mayors of Wilmington, Delaware

Other

- List of Delaware suffragists
- List of people from Wilmington, Delaware
- List of University of Delaware people
