= 1894 Delaware gubernatorial election =

- November 6, 1894
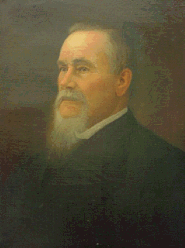

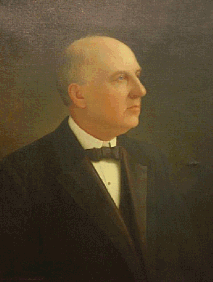
Nominee	Joshua H. Marvil	Ebe W. Tunnell
Party	Republican	Democratic
Popular vote	19,880	18,659
Percentage	50.80%	47.68%
- County results Marvil: 50–60% Tunnell: 40–50%
Governor before election
Robert J. Reynolds
Democratic
Elected Governor
Joshua H. Marvil
Republican

The 1894 Delaware gubernatorial election was held on November 6, 1894. Incumbent Democratic Governor Robert J. Reynolds was barred from seeking a second term. Sussex County Clerk of the Peace Ebe W. Tunnell won the Democratic nomination to succeed Reynolds and faced businessman Joshua H. Marvil, the Republican nominee, in the general election. Though the Republican Party had long been dormant in the state, it had almost won the 1890 gubernatorial election. This year, Marvil narrowly defeated Tunnell, becoming the first Republican to win a gubernatorial election since 1862. However, Marvil's term as Governor did not last long; he died on April 8, 1895, elevating State Senate President William T. Watson to the governorship. Tunnell would later go on to be elected Governor in 1896.

== General election ==
1894 Delaware gubernatorial election
Party	Candidate	Votes	%	±%
Republican	Joshua H. Marvil	19,880	50.80%	+1.91%
Democratic	Ebe W. Tunnell	18,659	47.68%	−2.75%
Prohibition	Thomas J. Perry	588	1.50%	+0.83%
Independent	J. Alexander Fulton	7	0.02%	—
Majority		1,221	3.12%	+1.58%
Turnout		39,134	100.00%	
Republican gain from Democratic				

== Bibliography ==
- Delaware Senate Journal, 85th General Assembly, 1st Reg. Sess. (1895).
