= 1896 Delaware gubernatorial election =

- November 3, 1896
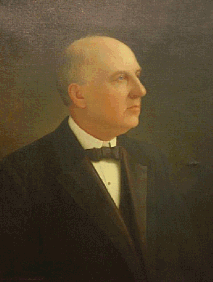

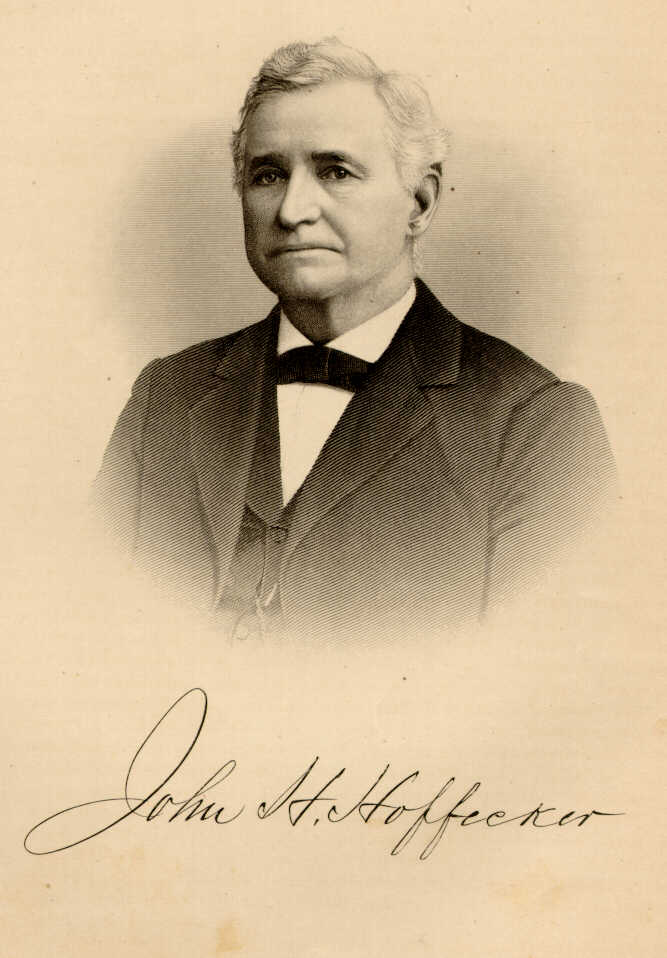
Nominee	Ebe W. Tunnell	John H. Hoffecker	John C. Higgins
Party	Democratic	Union Republican	Republican
Popular vote	15,507	11,014	7,154
Percentage	44.20%	31.40%	20.39%
- County results Tunnell: 40–50% 50–60%
Governor before election
William T. Watson
Democratic
Elected Governor
Ebe W. Tunnell
Democratic

The 1896 Delaware gubernatorial election was held on November 3, 1896. Shortly after his victory in the 1894 gubernatorial election, Republican Governor Joshua H. Marvil died. State Senate Speaker William T. Watson, a Democrat, became Governor and a new election for a full four-year term was scheduled in 1896. Though Watson was considered a potential candidate for re-election, the Democratic convention instead nominated Ebe W. Tunnell, the 1894 nominee for Governor; despite his protests that he would decline the nomination, Tunnell ultimately accepted it.

The Republican Party, meanwhile, split in the election and nominated two separate candidates for Governor: the faction of the Republican Party affiliated with wealthy industrialist J. Edward Addicks split off from the main Party and nominated John H. Hoffecker the President of the Smyrna Town Council. The anti-Addicks faction, which held the official Republican banner, nominated former State Representative John C. Higgins. The fragmentation continued throughout the campaign, and despite rumors that the fractions would reunite and nominate a single candidate, they did not do so.

The split ended up destroying the Republican Party's chances of regaining the governorship; Tunnell defeated Hoffecker and Higgins by a 12.81% margin, though he fell far short of a majority. This ended up being the final election that occurred under the 1831 Constitution; the 1897 Constitution was drafted the following year and ratified prior to the 1900 gubernatorial election.

== General election ==
1896 Delaware gubernatorial election
Party	Candidate	Votes	%	±%
Democratic	Ebe W. Tunnell	15,507	44.20%	−3.48%
Union Republican	John H. Hoffecker	11,014	31.40%	—
Republican	John C. Higgins	7,154	20.39%	−30.41%
Single Tax	Louis N. Slaughter	855	2.44%	+0.93%
Prohibition	Daniel Green	548	1.56%	—
Write-ins		3	0.01%	—
Majority		4,493	12.81%	+9.69%
Turnout		35,081	100.00%	
Democratic hold				

== Bibliography ==
- Delaware Senate Journal, 86th General Assembly, 1st Reg. Sess. (1897).
