= Hoffecker =

Hoffecker, the surname of two United States representatives from Delaware, may refer to:

- John H. Hoffecker (1827–1900)
- Walter O. Hoffecker (1854–1934)
