= J. Frank Allee =

American politician

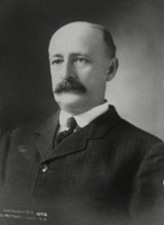

United States Senator from Delaware
- In office March 2, 1903 – March 3, 1907
- Preceded by: Richard R. Kenney^{*}
- Succeeded by: Harry A. Richardson

Member of the Delaware Senate
- In office January 13, 1899 - March 2, 1903

Personal details
- Born: December 2, 1857 Dover, Delaware
- Died: October 12, 1938 (aged 80) Dover, Delaware
- Party: Republican
- Spouse: Lizzie Stevens
- Occupation: Merchant
- ^{*}This seat had been vacant since March 4, 1901.

James Frank Allee (December 2, 1857 – October 12, 1938) was an American merchant and politician from Dover, in Kent County, Delaware. He was a member of the Republican Party who served in the Delaware General Assembly and as U.S. Senator from Delaware. He was known by his middle name.

== Early life and family ==
Allee was born in Dover, Delaware to Martha Jane Day and James Francis Allee. He is descended from French Huguenots from Artois (original surname spelled d'Ailly) who moved to New Jersey in the 1680s, then Delaware. The Allee House on Bombay Hook, Kent, Delaware still stands. Following his education he learned the trade of jeweler and watchmaker from his father, whom he succeeded in business. He worked in the jewelry business throughout his life, as well as engaging in the fruit and vegetable canning industry. He married January 18, 1882 to Lizzie Stevens and they were members of the Christ Episcopal Church in Dover.

== Party Chairman ==
Allee was chairman of the Republican Party State committee from 1886 until 1896 and was a State Senator for three sessions from the 1899/1900 session through the 1903/04 session.

Elections at this time were often decided by which candidate was best able to assist certain voters in the payment of their poll tax. This was especially true in 1894, as the country was in the midst of an economic depression, the effects of which were particularly bad in Delaware, and comparable to the Great Depression of the 1930s. As chairman of the Republican Party State committee, Allee sought funding to support Republican candidates. He naturally went for help to the only statewide Republican officeholder, U.S. Senator Anthony Higgins. Higgins had the kind of ties to the wealthy New Castle County Republican establishment that could have found the cash necessary. Unfortunately, as New Castle Republicans were prone to do, Higgins dismissed the request in such a manner that Allee, and his downstate associates, never forgot, and promptly sought assistance elsewhere.

The help was at hand in the person of J. Edward Addicks. Addicks was a wealthy gas company industrialist from Philadelphia, who had established a residence in northern Delaware. He had contributed some money to both parties over the years, but now worked out an arrangement with Allee that sent massive amounts of cash to the downstate Republicans in return for their support for Addicks' candidacy for the U.S. Senate seat of Anthony Higgins. This arrangement continued for a decade and was enormously beneficial in the rebuilding of the Republican Party in Kent and Sussex County, as a progressive alternative to the established political order.

There was a negative side to the arrangement, however. Higgins and the New Castle Republicans despised Allee, and the "carpetbagger" Addicks, and refused to support them in any way. While the 1894 elections brought a Republican majority to the General Assembly, only six were aligned with Allee and Addicks. Six was enough to prevent Higgins from gaining a majority, but not enough to elect Addicks. The General Assembly was deadlocked, and the U.S. Senate seat remained vacant for nearly two years, until the Democrats regained the majority two years later.

In the meantime Allee and Addicks’ efforts continued to bear fruit to the extent that their supporters became a majority at the 1896 Republican State Convention. This development triggered a walkout by the New Castle Republicans, who promptly labeled themselves the "Regular Republicans" or "Regulars." The Allee and Addicks faction became known as "Union Republicans." The split continued as long as Addicks pursued his dream of a seat in the U.S. Senate.

== United States Senate ==
By 1899, the Republicans were back in the majority in the General Assembly and another U.S. Senate seat came vacant. In 1901, the second one became vacant as well. Now Delaware had two seats vacant and still the General Assembly could not elect anyone. The situation was drawing national attention, and ridicule. Finally, the "Regular Republicans" issued an ultimatum to Allee, saying they would cooperate with the Democrats unless Addicks would relent. Under much pressure, Addicks did finally compromise by allowing his lieutenant, Allee, to be elected to one of the U.S. Senate seats on March 2, 1903. By the time Allee's term ended, Addicks had lost his fortune and left Delaware politics. T. Coleman du Pont became the effective Republican leader and managed to bring the two competing factions together. Without his mentor, Allee was politically stranded, and therefore, was not a candidate for reelection when his term ended.

Allee filled the vacancy in the term commencing March 4, 1901. During this term, he served with the Republican majority in the 58th and 59th Congress. In the 58th Congress he was Chairman of the Committee on Indian Depredations until December 14, 1904, when he left the committee to become chairman of the Committee on the Organization, Conduct, and Expenditures of the Executive Departments. During the 59th Congress, he chaired the Committee on Railroads. In all, he served from March 2, 1903, until March 4, 1907, during the administration of U.S. President Theodore Roosevelt.

Years later, Allee became involved with yet another Republican intra-party squabble. This grew out of the bitter competition between Alfred I. du Pont and Pierre S. du Pont. Allee gave his support to Alfred I. du Pont.

== Death and legacy ==
Allee died at Dover and is buried there in the Christ Episcopal Church Cemetery.

== Almanac ==
Elections are held the first Tuesday after November 1. Members of the Delaware General Assembly take office the second Tuesday of January. The State Senate has a term of four years. The General Assembly chose the U.S. Senators, who took office March 4 for a six-year term.

Public Offices
Office	Type	Location	Began office	Ended office	notes
State Senator	Legislature	Dover	January 10, 1899	January 13, 1903	
State Senator	Legislature	Dover	January 13, 1903	March 2, 1903	
U.S. Senator	Legislature	Washington	March 2, 1903	March 3, 1907	

United States Congressional service
Dates	Congress	Chamber	Majority	President	Committees	Class/District
1903–1905	58th	Senate	Republican	Theodore Roosevelt	Indian Depredations; Executive Departments	class 2
1905–1907	59th	Senate	Republican	Theodore Roosevelt	Railroads	class 2

== Images ==
- Hall of Governors Portrait Gallery; Portrait courtesy of Historical and Cultural Affairs, Dover.

U.S. Senate
Preceded by Richard R. Kenney	U.S. senator (Class 2) from Delaware; 1903-1907	Succeeded by Harry A. Richardson
