= Levin Handy =

Levin Handy may refer to:

- Levin Corbin Handy (ca. 1855–1932), American photographer
- L. Irving Handy (1861–1922), American educator, lawyer and politician
