= Ivy Dale Farm =

Historic house in Delaware, United States

- U.S. National Register of Historic Places
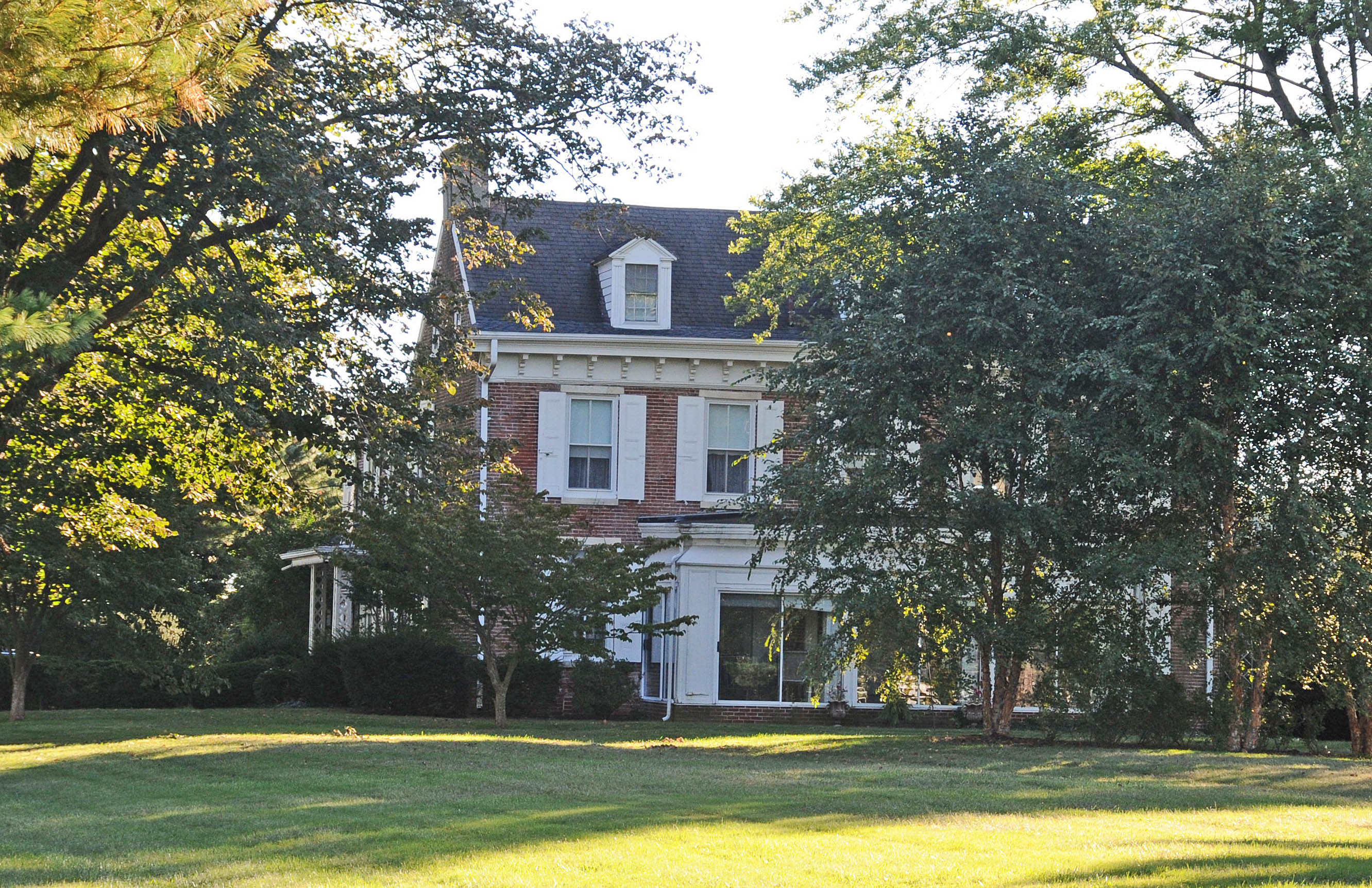

- Location within Delaware Location within the United States
- Location: 1101 Smyrna-Lepsic Road, near Smyrna, Delaware
- Coordinates: 39.286834°N 75.579573°W
- Area: 1 acre (0.40 ha)
- Built: c. 1786
- Architectural style: Georgian
- NRHP reference No.: 73000504
- Added to NRHP: April 24, 1973

Ivy Dale Farm, also known as Ivy Green and the Hoffecker Farm, is a historic home located near Smyrna, Kent County, Delaware. It built about 1786, as a modest house, probably erected on the "Resurrection Manor" plan, with a rear kitchen outbuilding. It was remodeled and enlarged in 1845, in a Georgian plan. The brick veneer house is two-stories, five bays wide, with a gable roof and rear wing. The front facade features a three bay, centered, frame porch. It was the home of Congressman John H. Hoffecker and his son Congressman Walter O. Hoffecker.

It was listed on the National Register of Historic Places in 1973.
