= Ebe W. Tunnell =

American politician (1844–1917)

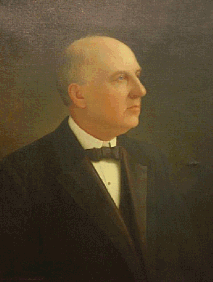

50th Governor of Delaware
- In office January 19, 1897 – January 15, 1901
- Preceded by: William T. Watson
- Succeeded by: John Hunn

Member of the Delaware House of Representatives
- In office January 3, 1871 – January 7, 1873

Personal details
- Born: December 31, 1844 Ocean View, Delaware
- Died: December 18, 1917 (aged 72) Lewes, Delaware
- Party: Democratic
- Occupation: Merchant

Ebe Walter Tunnell (December 31, 1844 – December 18, 1917) was an American merchant and politician from Lewes, in Sussex County, Delaware. He was a member of the Democratic Party, who served in the Delaware General Assembly and as Governor of Delaware.

== Early life and family ==
Tunnell was born at Blackwater, Delaware, near Clarksville, now Ocean View, Sussex County, Delaware, son of Nancy J. Long and Stephen Tunnell. After attending the public schools at Milford and Lewes, he ran the Blackwater general store started by his grandfather. He moved to Lewes in 1872, and operated a drug and hardware business there and was a member of the Lewes Presbyterian Church.

He was one of two Delaware governors who never married.

== Governor of Delaware ==
Tunnell was a member of the Delaware House of Representatives in the 1871/72 session and Clerk of the Peace for Sussex County from 1885 through 1890. He was the unsuccessful Democratic Party candidate for Governor of Delaware in 1894, losing to the Republican Party candidate, Joshua H. Marvil. Two years later, in 1896, he was elected governor, defeating the Union (Addicks) Republican Party candidate, James R. Hoffecker, and the regular Republican Party candidate John C. Higgins. He served one term as governor from January 19, 1897, until January 15, 1901.

The Delaware Constitution of 1897, the state's constitution, was written and adopted during his term. It added some representation for New Castle County in the Delaware General Assembly, but reduced the representation of Wilmington, which was already the state's most populous part. Among many other changes, it created the office of Lieutenant Governor, allowed governors to be elected to a second term and gave them a legislative veto, reduced judges' terms from life to 12 years, and eliminated the poll tax. It was also during his term that the General Incorporation Law was passed, creating the favorable business environment that has resulted in Delaware becoming the preferred place in the U.S. for companies to incorporate.

Delaware General Assembly (sessions while Governor)
Year	Assembly	Senate Majority	Speaker	House Majority	Speaker
1897–1898	89th	Democratic	Hezekiah Harrington	Democratic	Emery B. Riggin
1899–1900	90th	Democratic	Charles M. Salmon	Republican	Theodore F. Clark

== Death and legacy ==
After his term ended, Tunnell returned to Lewes, where he became president of the Farmers' Bank of Delaware, a director of the Delaware, Maryland and Virginia Railroad, and owner of the Delaware Pilot. He died at Lewes, and is buried there in the Lewes Presbyterian Church cemetery.

== Almanac ==
Elections are held the first Tuesday after November 1. Members of the Delaware General Assembly took office the first Tuesday of January. State representatives have a two-year term. The governor takes office the third Tuesday of January and has a four-year term.

Public Offices
Office	Type	Location	Began office	Ended office	notes
State Representative	Legislature	Dover	January 3, 1871	January 7, 1873	
Clerk of the Peace	Executive	Georgetown	1885	1890	Sussex County
Governor	Executive	Dover	January 19, 1897	January 15, 1901	

Delaware General Assembly service
Dates	Assembly	Chamber	Majority	Governor	Committees	District
1871–1872	76th	State House	Democratic	James Ponder		Sussex at-large

Election results
Year	Office	Subject	Party	Votes	%	Opponent	Party	Votes	%
1894	Governor	Ebe W. Tunnell	Democratic	18,659	47%	Joshua H. Marvil	Republican	19,880	50%
1896	Governor	Ebe W. Tunnell	Democratic	15,507	44%	John H. Hoffecker; John C. Higgins	Union Republican; Republican	11,014; 7,154	31% 20%

== Images ==
- Hall of Governors Portrait Gallery Portrait courtesy of Historical and Cultural Affairs, Dover.

== Places with more information ==
- Delaware Historical Society; website; 505 North Market Street, Wilmington, Delaware 19801; (302) 655-7161
- University of Delaware; Library website; 181 South College Avenue, Newark, Delaware 19717; (302) 831-2965

Party political offices
Preceded by Robert J. Reynolds	Democratic nominee for Governor of Delaware; 1894, 1896	Succeeded by Peter J. Ford
Political offices
Preceded by William T. Watson	Governor of Delaware; 1897–1901	Succeeded by John Hunn
