= Richard R. Kenney =

American politician (1856–1931)

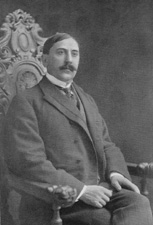

United States Senator from Delaware
- In office January 19, 1897 – March 3, 1901
- Preceded by: Anthony Higgins
- Succeeded by: J. Frank Allee

Personal details
- Born: Richard Rolland Kenney; September 9, 1856 Laurel, Delaware
- Died: August 14, 1931 (aged 74) Dover, Delaware
- Party: Democratic
- Education: Hobart College
- Profession: Lawyer

Richard Rolland Kenney (September 9, 1856 – August 14, 1931) was an American lawyer and politician from Dover, in Kent County, Delaware. He was a member of the Democratic Party who was a U.S. Senator from Delaware.

== Early life and family ==
Kenney was born in Laurel, Delaware. He attended public schools and Laurel Academy, and graduated in 1878 from Hobart College in Geneva, New York. Subsequently, he studied the law, was admitted to the bar in 1881, and began a practice in Dover, Delaware.

== Professional and political career ==
Kenney was the State Librarian from 1879 until 1881. He was also Captain in the National Guard from 1880 until 1889, and Adjutant General of the state from 1887 until 1891. In 1896 he became a member of the Democratic National Committee.

He was elected to the U.S. Senate on January 19, 1897. He filled the vacancy in the term commencing March 4, 1895, caused by the ongoing Addicks controversy. During this term, he served with the Democratic minority in the 54th, 55th, and 56th Congress. The Democrats were unable to secure his reelection in 1901, and the seat became vacant again. In all, he served from January 19, 1897, until March 4, 1901, during the administration of U.S. President William McKinley.

Following his term, Kenney resumed the practice of law in Dover. Later, during the World War I, he served in the Judge Advocate General's Department. In 1921 he was elected counsel to the Delaware House of Representatives, elected prosecuting attorney by the levy court of Kent County, and appointed a member of the State board of supplies. He was also member and secretary of the State public lands commission from 1913 until 1929.

== Death and legacy ==
Kenney died at Dover and is buried there in the Christ Episcopal Church Cemetery.

== Almanac ==
The General Assembly chose the U.S. Senators, who took office March 4 for a six-year term.

Public offices
Office	Type	Location	Began office	Ended office	Notes
U.S. Senator	Legislature	Washington, D.C.	January 19, 1897	March 3, 1901	

United States congressional service
Dates	Congress	Chamber	Majority	President	Committees	Class/District
1895–1897	54th	U.S. Senate	Republican	Grover Cleveland		class 2
1897–1899	55th	U.S. Senate	Republican	William McKinley		class 2
1899–1901	56th	U.S. Senate	Republican	William McKinley		class 2

== Images ==
- Biographical Directory of the United States

U.S. Senate
Preceded by Anthony Higgins	U.S. senator (Class 2) from Delaware; January 19, 1897 – March 3, 1901; Served alongside: George Gray	Succeeded by J. Frank Allee
