= Gov. William T. Watson Mansion =

Historic house in Delaware, US

- U.S. National Register of Historic Places
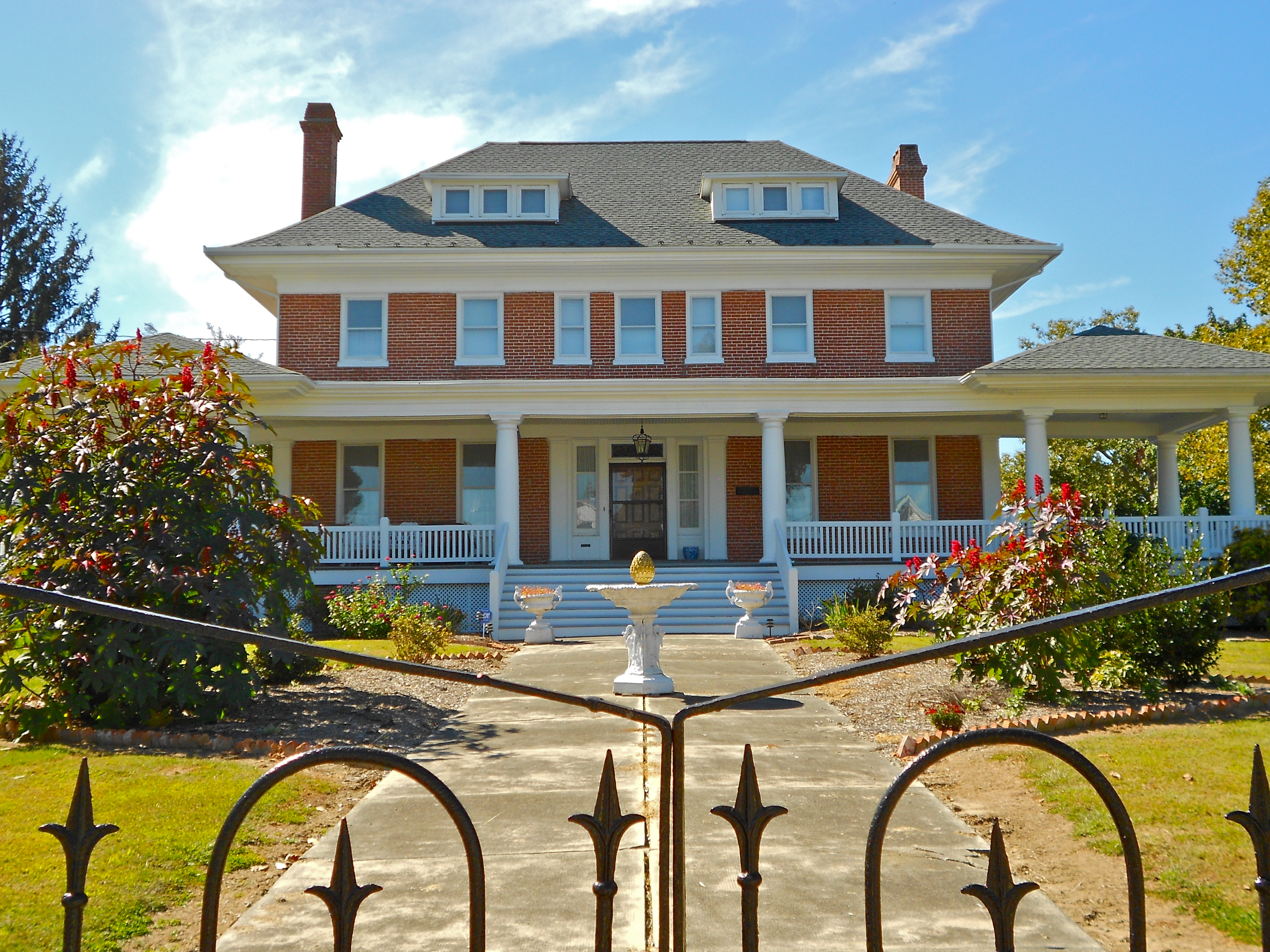
- The mansion in 2013

- Location within Delaware Location within the United States
- Location: 600 N. Walnut St., Milford, Delaware
- Coordinates: 38°55′12″N 75°25′47″W
- Area: 5.1 acres (2.1 ha)
- Built: 1906
- Architectural style: Classical Revival
- MPS: Milford MRA
- NRHP reference No.: 82002323
- Added to NRHP: April 22, 1982

Gov. William T. Watson Mansion is a historic mansion located at Milford, Kent County, Delaware. It was built in 1906, and is a two-story, five-bay, center hall brick dwelling in the Classical Revival style. It features a full-width front porch with massive round wooden Doric order columns and a hipped roof with dormers. It was the home of Delaware Governor William T. Watson (1849–1917).

It was listed on the National Register of Historic Places in 1982.
