= 1890 Delaware gubernatorial election =

- November 4, 1890
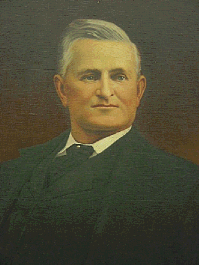

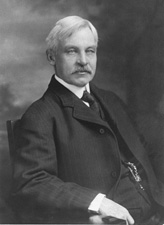
Nominee	Robert J. Reynolds	Harry A. Richardson
Party	Democratic	Republican
Popular vote	17,801	17,258
Percentage	50.43%	48.89%
- County results Reynolds: 50–60% Richardson: 50–60%
Governor before election
Benjamin T. Biggs
Democratic
Elected Governor
Robert J. Reynolds
Democratic

The 1890 Delaware gubernatorial election was held on November 4, 1890. Incumbent Democratic Governor Benjamin T. Biggs was unable to seek a second consecutive term in office. Former State Treasurer Robert J. Reynolds won the Democratic nomination to succeed Biggs, and in the general election, he faced banker Harry A. Richardson, the Republican nominee. In stark contrast to the 1886 election, the Republican Party fully contested the state's elections and a close contest ensued. Reynolds ultimately defeated Richardson by a narrow margin, winning by just 543 votes.

== General election ==
1890 Delaware gubernatorial election
Party	Candidate	Votes	%	±%
Democratic	Robert J. Reynolds	17,801	50.43%	−13.07%
Republican	Harry A. Richardson	17,258	48.89%	—
Prohibition	William T. Kellum	238	0.67%	−35.00%
Majority		543	1.54%	−26.29%
Turnout		35,297	100.00%	
Democratic hold				

== Bibliography ==
- Delaware Senate Journal, 83rd General Assembly, 1st Reg. Sess. (1891).
