= Harry A. Richardson =

American politician

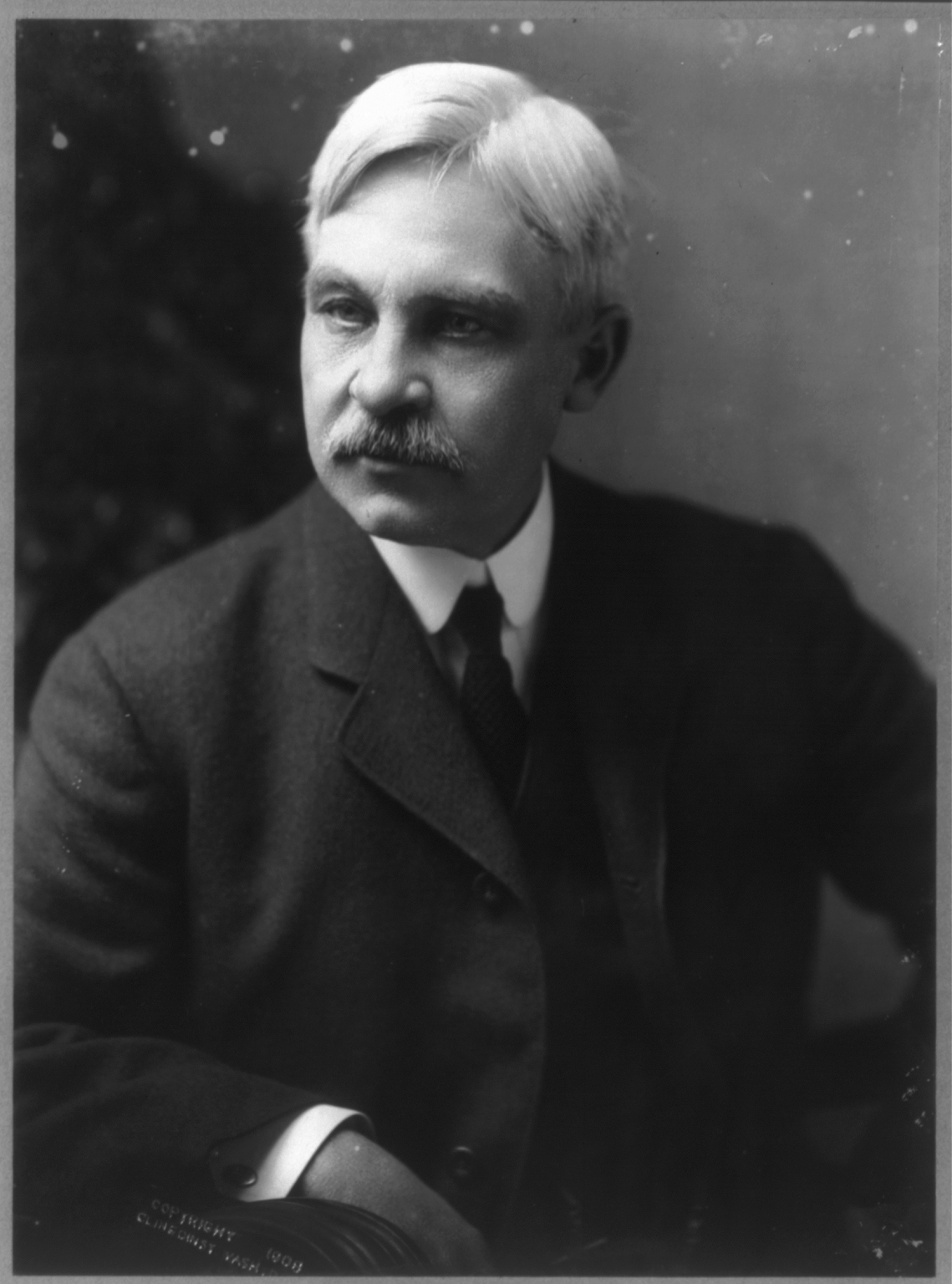

United States Senator from Delaware
- In office March 4, 1907 – March 3, 1913
- Preceded by: J. Frank Allee
- Succeeded by: Willard Saulsbury, Jr.

Member of the Delaware Senate
- In office January 4, 1888 - January 3, 1889

Personal details
- Born: January 1, 1853 Camden, Delaware
- Died: June 16, 1928 (aged 75) Dover, Delaware
- Party: Republican
- Spouse: Priscilla Walker
- Occupation: Businessman

Harry Alden Richardson (January 1, 1853 – June 16, 1928) was an American businessman and politician from Dover, in Kent County, Delaware. He was a member of the Republican Party, and was U.S. Senator from Delaware.

== Early life and family ==
Richardson was born in Camden, Delaware, the son of Alden B. Richardson and Lucy R. Richardson. His family moved to Dover, Delaware when he was a small child in 1858. He attended the common schools there and the Kent Academy in East Greenwich, Rhode Island. In 1876 he married Priscilla Walker. Both he and Walker were members of the Baptist Church.

== Professional and political career ==
Richardson worked in his father's canning and packing business in Dover, eventually becoming a partner and assuming control in 1894. He continued in this business throughout his life, was President of the First National Bank of Dover, and was also interested in various public-service corporations.

In his first attempt at public office, he ran for the office of Governor of Delaware in 1890, but lost to Democrat Robert J. Reynolds. Then, many years later, in 1907, he was elected to the U.S. Senate. During this term, he served with the Republican majority in the 60th, 61st, and 62nd U.S. Congress. In the 61st Congress, he was Chairman of the Committee to Examine Branches of the Civil Service, and in the 62nd Congress he was Chairman of the Committee on Pacific Islands and Puerto Rico, and a member of the Committee on Printing. He did not seek reelection in 1913, and in all, served from March 4, 1907, to March 4, 1913, during the administrations of U.S. Presidents Theodore Roosevelt and William H. Taft.

== Death and legacy ==
Richardson died in Dover, and is now buried there in the Lakeside Methodist Episcopal Cemetery.

== Ancestry ==
Richardson is a direct descendant of Major General Humphrey Atherton.

== Almanac ==
The General Assembly chose the U.S. Senators, who took office March 4 for a six-year term.

Public Offices
Office	Type	Location	Began office	Ended office	notes
State Senator	Legislature	Dover	January 4, 1888	January 3, 1889	
U.S. Senator	Legislature	Washington	March 4, 1907	March 3, 1913	

United States Congressional service
Dates	Congress	Chamber	Majority	President	Committees	Class/District
1907–1909	60th	Senate	Republican	Theodore Roosevelt		class 2
1909–1911	61st	Senate	Republican	William Howard Taft		class 2
1911–1913	62nd	Senate	Republican	William Howard Taft		class 2

Election results
Year	Office	Subject	Party	Votes	%	Opponent	Party	Votes	%
1890	Governor	Harry A. Richardson	Republican	17,258	49%	Robert J. Reynolds	Democratic	17,801	51%

== Biography ==
- Munroe, John A. (1993). History of Delaware. Newark, Delaware: University of Delaware Press. ISBN 0-87413-493-5.

== Images ==
- Biographical Directory of the U.S. Congress

Party political offices
Vacant Title last held by Albert Curry	Republican nominee for Governor of Delaware; 1890	Succeeded by Joshua H. Marvil
U.S. Senate
Preceded by J. Frank Allee	U.S. senator (Class 2) from Delaware; 1907-1913	Succeeded by Willard Saulsbury Jr.
