= John W. Causey =

American politician

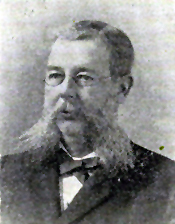

Member of the U.S. House of Representatives from Delaware's at-large district
- In office March 4, 1891 – March 3, 1895
- Preceded by: John B. Penington
- Succeeded by: Jonathan S. Willis

Member of the Delaware Senate
- In office 1875–1877

Personal details
- Born: September 19, 1841 Milford, Delaware, U.S.
- Died: October 1, 1908 (aged 67) Milford, Delaware, U.S.
- Party: Democratic
- Education: Pennsylvania Agricultural College
- Profession: Farmer

John William Causey (September 19, 1841 – October 1, 1908) was an American politician, lawyer and farmer from the state of Delaware. He was a member of the Democratic Party who served as a state senator and as a member of the U.S. House of Representatives.

== Life and career ==
Causey was born in Milford, Delaware, attended a private school, The Albany Academy in Albany, New York, and was graduated from the Pennsylvania Agricultural College.

A Democrat, Causey was elected to the Delaware State Senate for 1875–1877 and was a delegate to the Democratic National Convention in 1884. President Grover Cleveland appointed him an internal-revenue collector for Delaware in 1885, and he served in that capacity until 1887. He served in the U.S. House of Representatives from March 4, 1891, until March 4, 1895, but was not a candidate for renomination in 1894.

Causey died at Milford and is buried there in the Odd Fellows Cemetery.

== Almanac ==
Public offices
Office	Type	Location	Began office	Ended office	Notes
State Senate	Legislature	Dover	January 3, 1875	January 3, 1877	
U.S. Representative	Legislature	Washington	March 4, 1891	March 3, 1895	

United States congressional service
Dates	Congress	Chamber	Majority	President	Committees	Class/District
1891–1893	52nd	U.S. House	Democratic	Benjamin Harrison		at-large
1893–1895	53rd	U.S. House	Democratic	Grover Cleveland		at-large

Election results
Year	Office	Subject	Party	Votes	%	Opponent	Party	Votes	%
1890	U.S. Representative	John W. Causey	Democratic	17,848	50%	Henry P. Cannon	Republican	17,180	49%
1892	U.S. Representative	John W. Causey	Democratic	17,848	51%	Jonathan S. Willis	Union Republican	18,080	49%

== Places with more information ==
- Delaware Historical Society; website; 505 North Market Street, Wilmington, Delaware 19801; (302) 655-7161.
- University of Delaware; Library website; 181 South College Avenue, Newark, Delaware 19717; (302) 831-2965.
- Newark Free Library; 750 Library Ave., Newark, Delaware; (302) 731-7550.

U.S. House of Representatives
Preceded by John B. Penington	Member of the U.S. House of Representatives from Delaware's at-large congressional district 1891–1895	Succeeded by Jonathan S. Willis
