= John H. Hoffecker =

American politician (1827–1900)

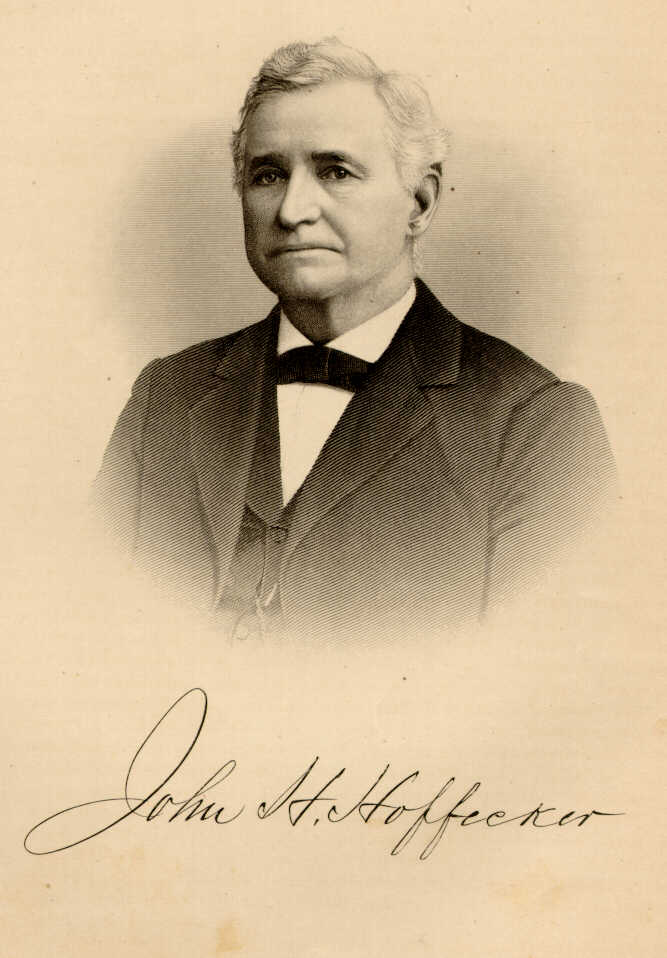

Member of the U.S. House of Representatives from Delaware's at-large district
- In office March 4, 1899 – June 16, 1900
- Preceded by: L. Irving Handy
- Succeeded by: Walter O. Hoffecker

Member of the Delaware House of Representatives
- In office January 10, 1889 – January 10, 1891

Personal details
- Born: September 12, 1827 Smyrna, Delaware, U.S.
- Died: June 16, 1900 (aged 72) Smyrna, Delaware, U.S.
- Party: Republican
- Occupation: Engineer

John Henry Hoffecker (September 12, 1827 – June 16, 1900) was an American engineer and politician from Smyrna in Kent County, Delaware. He was a member of the Republican Party, and served as U.S. Representative from Delaware.

== Early life and family ==
Hoffecker was born in Kent County, near Smyrna, Delaware, the son of Joseph and Rachel Van Gasken Hoffecker. He studied civil engineering and entered into that profession in 1853. He married twice, first to Annie E. Appleton, with whom he had four children, Walter O., John A., James Edwin, and Annie. He married secondly, Charlotte Jerman, the widow of Joseph H. Hoffecker. She had been a missionary in China from 1875 to 1878.

== Political career ==
Hoffecker was originally a member of the Whig Party, but like so many others, became a Republican in 1856. He was a delegate to the Republican National Convention in 1876 and 1884. He was also president of the Smyrna town council from 1878 until 1898. Elected to the state House in 1888, he served in the 1889–90 session and was elected Speaker. He ran for governor in 1896 as the candidate of both the Union Republicans (controlled by (J. Edward Addicks), and the National Party (a rival to the Prohibition Party). However, enough votes went to the regular (Anti-Addicks) Republican candidate, John C. Higgins, that Democrat Ebe W. Tunnell was elected.

Hoffecker was elected to the U.S. House of Representatives in 1898, defeating incumbent Democratic U.S. Representative L. Irving Handy. He served in the Republican majority in the 56th Congress. On June 16, 1900, during a visit home from the 1900 Republican National Convention in Philadelphia, Hoffecker suffered a stroke and died. He had served from March 4, 1899, until his death, during the administration of U.S. President William McKinley.

== Death and legacy ==
Hoffecker died at Smyrna and is buried there in the Glenwood Cemetery. His son, Walter O. Hoffecker, was elected to finish his term in the U.S. House. His home, Ivy Dale Farm, was listed on the National Register of Historic Places in 1973.

== Almanac ==
Elections are held the first Tuesday after November 1. Members of the Delaware General Assembly take office the second Tuesday of January. The State House members have a two-year term. U.S. Representatives took office March 4 and also have a two-year term.

Public Offices
Office	Type	Location	Began office	Ended office	notes
State Representative	Legislature	Dover	January 10, 1889	January 10, 1891	Speaker
U.S. Representative	Legislature	Washington	March 4, 1899	June 16, 1900	died in office

United States Congressional service
Dates	Congress	Chamber	Majority	President	Committees	Class/District
1899–1901	56th	U.S. House	Republican	William McKinley		at-large

Election results
Year	Office	Subject	Party	Votes	%	Opponent	Party	Votes	%
1896	Governor	John H. Hoffecker	Union Republican	11,014	31%	Ebe W. Tunnell; John C. Higgins	Democratic; Republican	15,507; 7,154	44% 20%
1898	U.S. Representative	John H. Hoffecker	Republican	17,566	54%	L. Irving Handy	Democratic	15,053	46%

== See also ==
- List of members of the United States Congress who died in office (1900–1949)

== Places with information ==
- Delaware Historical Society; website; 505 North Market Street, Wilmington, Delaware 19801; (302) 655-7161.
- University of Delaware; Library website; 181 South College Avenue, Newark, Delaware 19717; (302) 831-2965.
- Newark Free Library; 750 Library Ave., Newark, Delaware; (302) 731-7550.

U.S. House of Representatives
Preceded by L. Irving Handy	Member of the U.S. House of Representatives from Delaware's at-large congressional district 1899–1900	Succeeded by Walter O. Hoffecker
