= Jonathan S. Willis =

American politician (1830–1903)

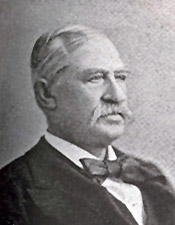

Member of the U.S. House of Representatives from Delaware's at-large district
- In office March 4, 1895 – March 3, 1897
- Preceded by: John W. Causey
- Succeeded by: L. Irving Handy

Personal details
- Born: April 5, 1830 Oxford, Maryland, U.S.
- Died: November 24, 1903 (aged 73) Milford, Delaware, U.S.
- Party: Republican

Jonathan Spencer Willis (April 5, 1830 – November 24, 1903) was an American politician from Milford in Kent County, Delaware. He was a member of the Republican Party, and served as U.S. Representative from Delaware.

== Early life and family ==
Willis was born in Oxford, Maryland, attended the district schools there and studied under private tutors.

Willis married twice. To Annie Barratt Townsend (1843–1885), they had one daughter, Elizabeth Townsend Willis (1864–1934). And to Edith Gillespie (1855–1914), they had one son Jonathan Spencer Willis Jr. (1892–1957).

== Professional and political career ==
He taught school seven years and then entered the ministry of the Methodist Episcopal Church, serving charges in Maryland, Delaware, Philadelphia, New York City, and Stamford, Connecticut. He retired from the ministry in 1884 and settled on a farm near Milford and engaged in fruit growing.

Willis was an unsuccessful Republican candidate for election in 1892 to the 53rd Congress, but was elected to the 54th Congress, serving from March 4, 1895, to March 3, 1897. He was an unsuccessful candidate, however, for reelection in 1896 to the 55th Congress, and returned to the full effort of agricultural pursuits.

== Death and legacy ==
He died in Milford and was buried in the Barratt's Chapel Cemetery near Frederica, Delaware.

== Almanac ==
Elections are held the first Tuesday after November 1. U.S. Representatives took office March 4 and have a two-year term.

Public offices
Office	Type	Location	Began office	Ended office	Notes
U.S. Representative	Legislature	Washington	March 4, 1895	March 3, 1897	

United States Congressional service
Dates	Congress	Chamber	Majority	President	Committees	Class/District
1895–1897	54th	U.S. House	Democratic	Grover Cleveland		at-large

Election results
Year	Office	Subject	Party	Votes	%	Opponent	Party	Votes	%
1892	U.S. Representative	Jonathan S. Willis	Republican	18,080	49%	John W. Causey	Democratic	18,554	51%
1894	U.S. Representative	Jonathan S. Willis	Republican	19,789	51%	Samuel Bancroft	Democratic	18,482	48%
1896	U.S. Representative	Jonathan S. Willis	Republican	11,159	32%	L. Irving Handy	Democratic	15,407	44%

== Places with more information ==
- Delaware Historical Society; website; 505 North Market Street, Wilmington, Delaware 19801; (302) 655-7161.
- University of Delaware; Library website; 181 South College Avenue, Newark, Delaware 19717; (302) 831-2965.

U.S. House of Representatives
Preceded by John W. Causey	Member of the U.S. House of Representatives from Delaware's at-large congressional district 1895–1897	Succeeded by L. Irving Handy
