= William T. Watson =

American politician (1849–1917)

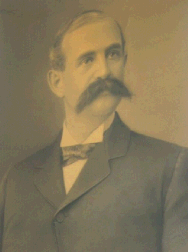

49th Governor of Delaware
- In office April 8, 1895 – January 19, 1897
- Preceded by: Joshua H. Marvil
- Succeeded by: Ebe W. Tunnell

Member of the Delaware Senate
- In office January 6, 1893 – April 8, 1895

Personal details
- Born: June 22, 1849 Milford, Delaware
- Died: April 14, 1917 (aged 67) Milford, Delaware
- Party: Democratic
- Spouse: Harriet Beale
- Education: Washington College
- Occupation: Banker

William Tharp Watson (June 22, 1849 – April 14, 1917) was an American banker and politician from Milford, in Kent County, Delaware. He was a member of the Democratic Party, who served in the Delaware General Assembly and as Governor of Delaware.

== Early life and family ==
Watson was born in Milford, Delaware, son of Bethuel & Ruth Tharp Watson and grandson of Governor William Tharp. He attended Washington College in Chestertown, Maryland and for a time lived in Philadelphia. He returned to Milford, where he worked with the Delaware, Maryland and Virginia Railroad and the First National Bank. Watson married Harriet Beale and had one child, William Jr. They lived at 600 North Walnut Street, Milford, and were members of Christ Episcopal Church in Milford.

== Professional and political career ==
At the turn of the twentieth century Delaware was going through a political transformation. Most obvious to the public was the unprecedented division in the Republican Party caused, in part, by the ambitions of J. Edward "Gas" Addicks for a seat in the U.S. Senate. A gas company industrialist, he spent vast amounts of his own fortune to rebuild the Republican Party in Delaware, seemingly for that purpose. This effort was very successful in heavily Democratic Kent County and Sussex County, where he financed the organization of a faction that came to be known as "Union Republicans." Meanwhile, he was making bitter enemies of the New Castle County "Regular Republicans," who considered him nothing more than a carpetbagger from Philadelphia.

Watson was a Democrat, and was first elected to the state house in 1884, but his eligibility was challenged due his previous residence in Philadelphia. As a result, did not take his seat and waited eight years, until 1892, to seek office again. Then he was elected to the state senate and served in the 1893/94 session and the 1895/96 session, when he was the Speaker. The 1894 elections, however, resulted in a Republican State House and a Republican Governor. Regardless, the state senate kept its Democratic majority, and when Governor Joshua H. Marvil died, the Speaker of the state senate succeeded him. Watson assumed the office of Governor of Delaware and served from April 8, 1895, until January 19, 1897.

All the while the Delaware General Assembly was attempting to elect a U.S. Senator. Since the two houses voted together, the more numerous Republicans held an overall majority and attempted to elect Henry A. du Pont to the office. But the Republicans were divided and enough supported the candidacy of Addicks to barely prevent a majority from electing du Pont. Then, with accession of Watson to the Governor's office, the total number of members seemed to be reduced and du Pont had a majority. The Delaware General Assembly went to vote only to find Watson had returned to his old state senate seat, casting his vote for the Democratic candidate, but more importantly preventing du Pont from receiving a majority. This was an unprecedented action by an unelected governor, but the Delaware Constitution of 1831, then in effect, did not address the question. The Republican Speaker of the state house disallowed the vote and certified the election of du Pont, but the Democratic-controlled U.S. Senate rejected his credentials, thereby preserving its own majority. This, of course, was the real purpose behind Watson's action. The soon-to-be-drafted Delaware Constitution of 1897 resolved the issue for good by creating the independent office of lieutenant governor.

Because of Governor Marvil's death, the General Assembly scheduled the next gubernatorial election in 1896, two years into the term. Delaware's gubernatorial elections have been held in the year of the U.S. presidential election ever since.

Delaware General Assembly (sessions while Governor)
| Year | Assembly | Senate Majority | Speaker | House Majority | Speaker |
|---|---|---|---|---|---|
| 1895-1896 | 88th | Democratic | vacant | Republican | Henry H. McMullen |

== Death and legacy ==
Watson died at Milford and is buried there in the Odd Fellows Cemetery. The Gov. William T. Watson Mansion was listed on the National Register of Historic Places in 1982.

== Almanac ==
Elections are held the first Tuesday after November 1. Members of the Delaware General Assembly took office the first Tuesday of January. State senators have a four-year term. The governor takes office the third Tuesday of January and has a four-year term.

Public Offices
| Office | Type | Location | Began office | Ended office | notes |
|---|---|---|---|---|---|
| State Senator | Legislature | Dover | January 6, 1893 | April 8, 1895 | |
| Governor | Executive | Dover | April 8, 1895 | January 19, 1897 | acting |

Delaware General Assembly service
| Dates | Assembly | Chamber | Majority | Governor | Committees | District |
|---|---|---|---|---|---|---|
| 1893-1894 | 87th | State Senate | Democratic | Robert J. Reynolds | | Kent at-large |
| 1895-1896 | 88th | State Senate | Democratic | Joshua H. Marvil | Speaker | Kent at-large |

== Images ==
- Hall of Governors Portrait Gallery Portrait courtesy of Historical and Cultural Affairs, Dover.

== Places with more information ==
- Delaware Historical Society; website; 505 North Market Street, Wilmington, Delaware 19801; (302) 655-7161
- University of Delaware; Library website; 181 South College Avenue, Newark, Delaware 19717; (302) 831-2965

Political offices
| Preceded by Joshua H. Marvil | Governor of Delaware; 1895–1897 | Succeeded by Ebe W. Tunnell |
