= Walter O. Hoffecker =

American politician (1854–1934)

Member of the U.S. House of Representatives from Delaware's at-large district
- In office November 6, 1900 – March 3, 1901
- Preceded by: John H. Hoffecker
- Succeeded by: L. Heisler Ball

Personal details
- Born: September 20, 1854 Smyrna, Delaware, U.S.
- Died: January 23, 1934 (aged 79) Smyrna, Delaware, U.S.
- Party: Republican
- Education: Lehigh University
- Profession: Engineer

Walter Oakley Hoffecker (September 20, 1854 – January 23, 1934) was an American engineer, businessman and politician from Smyrna in Kent County, Delaware. He was a member of the Republican Party and served as U.S. Representative from Delaware.

== Early life and family ==
Hoffecker was born in Smyrna, Delaware. He graduated from Smyrna Seminary in 1872, and in September 1873, he entered Lehigh University at Bethlehem, Pennsylvania, where he studied civil engineering.

== Professional career ==
Hoffecker was engaged in a variety of business ventures in the Smyrna area including farming, insurance, banking and canning. As a professional engineer with interest and expertise in transportation issues, he succeeded his father as President of the Philadelphia & Smyrna Transportation Co. He was also a Director of the Delaware Railroad and a member of the original State highway commission in 1917. Hoffecker's banking interest was the Fruit Growers Bank and Trust of Smyrna, of which he was President for thirty-two years.

In a special election on November 6, 1900, to fill the vacancy caused by the death of his father, U.S. Representative John H. Hoffecker, Hoffecker was elected to the U.S. House of Representatives, defeating Democrat Edward Fowler. He served in the Republican majority during the last session of the 56th Congress. He did not seek reelection to a full term and served only from November 6, 1900, until March 4, 1901, during the administration of U.S. President William McKinley. Several years later, in 1908, Hoffecker was a delegate to the Republican National Convention.

== Death and legacy ==
Hoffecker died at Smyrna and is buried there in the Glenwood Cemetery. His home Ivy Dale Farm was listed on the National Register of Historic Places in 1973.

== Almanac ==
Elections are held the first Tuesday after November 1. U.S. Representatives took office March 4 and have a two-year term. In this case, he was completing the existing term, the vacancy caused by the death of his father, John H. Hoffecker.

Public Offices
Office	Type	Location	Began office	Ended office	notes
U.S. Representative	Legislature	Washington	November 6, 1900	March 3, 1901	

United States Congressional service
Dates	Congress	Chamber	Majority	President	Committees	Class/District
1899–1901	56th	U.S. House	Republican	William McKinley		at-large

Election results
Year	Office	Subject	Party	Votes	%	Opponent	Party	Votes	%
1900	U.S. Representative	Walter O. Hoffecker	Republican	22,381	54%	Edward Fowler	Democratic	18,712	45%

== See also ==
- Politics of the United States
- United States Congress

U.S. House of Representatives
Preceded by John H. Hoffecker	Member of the U.S. House of Representatives from Delaware's at-large congressional district 1900–1901	Succeeded by L. Heisler Ball
