= Anthony Higgins (politician) =

American politician

Anthony C. Higgins
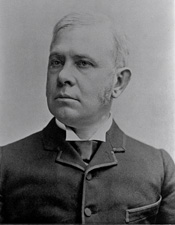

United States Senator from Delaware
- In office March 4, 1889 – March 3, 1895
- Preceded by: Eli Saulsbury
- Succeeded by: Richard R. Kenney

United States Attorney for the District of Delaware
- In office 1869–1876
- President: Ulysses S. Grant
- Preceded by: John Lockwood Pratt
- Succeeded by: William Corbit Spruance

Personal details
- Born: Anthony Clark Higgins; October 1, 1840 New Castle, Delaware
- Died: June 26, 1912 (aged 71) New York City, New York
- Party: Republican
- Education: Delaware College; Yale University; Harvard Law School
- Profession: Lawyer

Anthony Clark Higgins (October 1, 1840 – June 26, 1912) was an American lawyer and politician from Wilmington, in New Castle County, Delaware. He was a veteran of the Civil War and a member of the Republican Party, who served as United States Senator from Delaware.

== Early life and family ==
Higgins was born in Red Lion Hundred in New Castle County, Delaware. He attended Newark Academy and Delaware College, and graduated from Yale College in 1861, where he was a member of Skull and Bones. After studying law at the Harvard Law School, he was admitted to the bar in 1864 and began practice in Wilmington, Delaware. He also served for a time in the Union Army in 1864.

== Professional and public career ==
Higgins was appointed deputy Attorney General in 1864 and was the United States attorney for Delaware from 1869 until 1876. He was an unsuccessful Republican candidate for election to the 49th Congress in 1884, but was elected to the United States Senate and served from March 4, 1889, until March 3, 1895, when he unsuccessfully sought reelection. During his tenure he was Chairman of the committee to Examine Branches of the Civil Service in the 51st and 52nd Congress, and a member of the Committee on Manufactures in the 52nd Congress. Subsequently, he resumed the practice of law in Wilmington, including service as one of the attorneys for the respondent in the impeachment proceedings of United States District Court Judge Charles Swayne of Florida in 1904/05.

== Death and legacy ==
Higgins died while at New York, New York, and is buried at the St. Georges Cemetery, near St. Georges in New Castle County.

== Almanac ==
Elections are held the first week of November. The General Assembly chose the U.S. Senators, who took office March 4 for a six-year term.

Public offices
Office	Type	Location	Began office	Ended office	Notes
U.S. Senator	Legislature	Washington, D.C.	March 4, 1889	March 3, 1895	

United States congressional service
Dates	Congress	Chamber	Majority	President	Committees	Class/District
1889–1891	51st	U.S. Senate	Republican	Benjamin Harrison		class 2
1891–1893	52nd	U.S. Senate	Republican	Benjamin Harrison		class 2
1893–1895	53rd	U.S. Senate	Democratic	Grover Cleveland		class 2

Election results
Year	Office	Subject	Party	Votes	%	Opponent	Party	Votes	%
1884	U.S. Representative	Anthony Higgins	Republican	12,878	43%	Charles B. Lore	Democratic	17,054	57%

== Notes ==
U.S. Senate
Preceded by Eli Saulsbury	U.S. senator (Class 2) from Delaware; March 4, 1889 – March 3, 1895; Served alongside: George Gray	Succeeded by Richard R. Kenney
