= L. Irving Handy =

American politician (1861-1922)

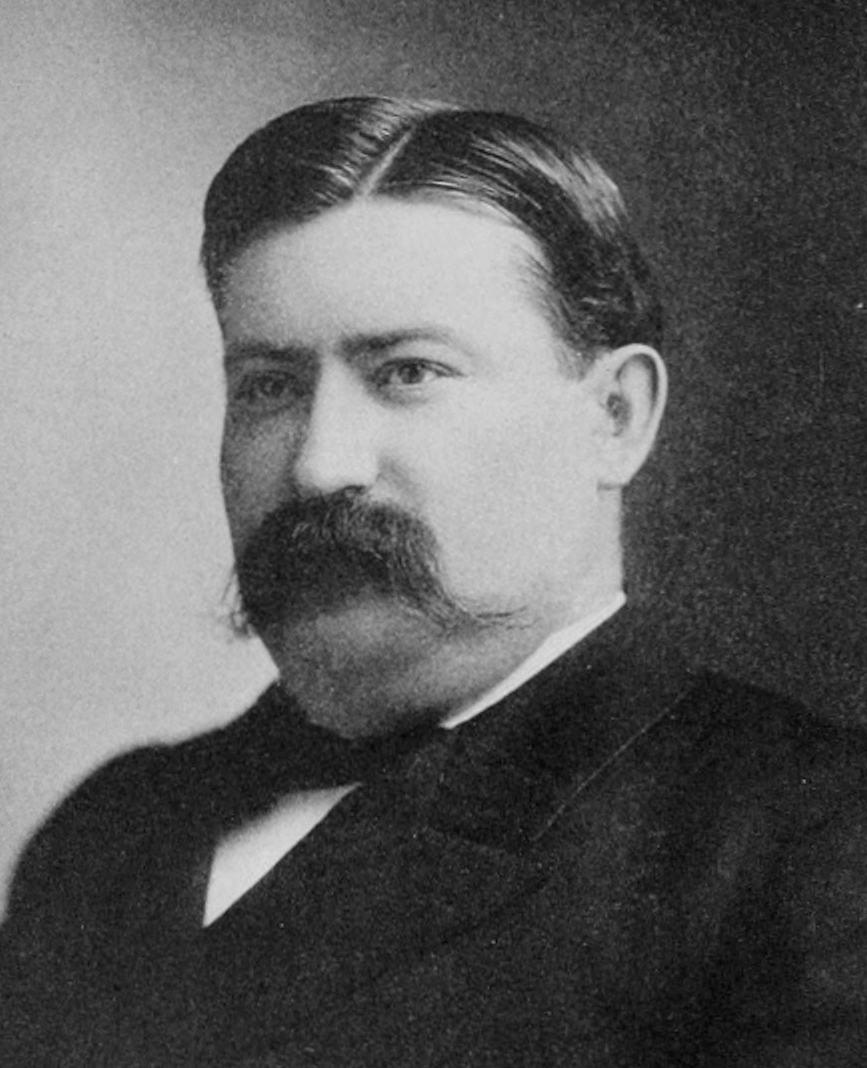

Member of the U.S. House of Representatives from Delaware's at-large district
- In office March 4, 1897 – March 3, 1899
- Preceded by: Jonathan S. Willis
- Succeeded by: John H. Hoffecker

Personal details
- Born: December 24, 1861 Berlin, Maryland, U.S.
- Died: February 3, 1922 (aged 60) Wilmington, Delaware, U.S.
- Party: Democratic
- Spouse: Mary Bell
- Profession: Educator, lawyer

Levin Irving Handy (December 24, 1861 – February 3, 1922) was an American educator, lawyer and politician, from Wilmington in New Castle County, Delaware. He was a member of the Democratic Party, who served as U.S. Representative from Delaware. He was known by his middle name.

== Early life and family ==
Handy was born in Berlin, Maryland, son of the Rev. William C. Handy, a Presbyterian minister. His grandfathers were William W. Handy, a prominent lawyer in Somerset County, Maryland, and the Rev. Robert J. Breckinridge of Kentucky. As the son of a frequently moving minister, he grew up living in multiple places, namely New York, Kentucky and the Eastern Shore of Maryland. He married Mary Bell in 1887 and they had two children, L. Irving Jr., and Margaret. He was also the nephew of William C. P. Breckenridge, a prominent Confederate Army officer and U.S. Representative from Kentucky.

== Professional and political career ==
Handy taught school at Dames Quarter, in Somerset County, Maryland, and in 1881, at the age of 19, was selected to be principal of the high school at Smyrna, Delaware. By 1887 he was superintendent of all the public schools in Kent County, Delaware, and by 1890 he had been hired as principal of Old Newark Academy, in Newark, Delaware. Meanwhile, he was studying the law with John R. Nicholson of Dover, Delaware, and frequently speaking at teacher's training schools in the region.

Retiring from teaching in 1892, he became an editorial writer for the Wilmington Every Evening newspaper. He also studied law, was admitted to the bar in 1899, and began the practice of law in Delaware.

With his retirement from teaching he took a more active role in politics, becoming chairman of the Democratic State Committee from 1892 until 1896. He sought the 1894 Democratic nomination for U.S. Representative, but lost to Samuel Bancroft, who himself lost in the election.

Handy was elected to the U.S. House of Representatives in 1896, defeating incumbent Republican U.S. Representative Jonathan S. Willis. During this term, he served in the Democratic minority in the 55th Congress. Seeking reelection in 1898, he lost to Republican John H. Hoffecker, a Smyrna businessman and relative of his wife. In all he served from March 4, 1897, until March 3, 1899, during the administration of U.S. President William McKinley. Subsequently, Handy remained active in politics, attending the Democratic National Conventions of 1900, 1904, and 1908, and losing an election for state Attorney General in 1904. He ran for U.S. Representative one more time, in 1908, but lost to Republican William H. Heald.

== Death and legacy ==
Handy died at Wilmington and is buried in the Glenwood Cemetery at Smyrna, Delaware. His daughter, Margaret, became a prominent physician in Wilmington. She practiced for fifty-five years, and was a leader in establishing milk banks for premature babies. Andrew Wyeth painted her portrait and named it "Children's Doctor".

== Almanac ==
Elections are held the first Tuesday after November 1. U.S. Representatives took office March 4 and have a two-year term.

Public Offices
Office	Type	Location	Began office	Ended office	notes
U.S. Representative	Legislature	Washington	March 4, 1897	March 3, 1899	

United States Congressional service
Dates	Congress	Chamber	Majority	President	Committees	Class/District
1897–1899	55th	U.S. House	Republican	William McKinley		at-large

Election results
Year	Office	Subject	Party	Votes	%	Opponent	Party	Votes	%
1896	U.S. Representative	L. Irving Handy	Democratic	16,512	45%	Jonathan S. Willis; Robert G. Houston	Union Republican; Regular Republican	12,828; 7,189	35% 20%
1898	U.S. Representative	L. Irving Handy	Democratic	15,053	46%	John H. Hoffecker	Republican	17,566	54%
1908	U.S. Representative	L. Irving Handy	Democratic	22,515	47%	William H. Heald	Republican	24,314	51%

== Places with more information ==
- Delaware Historical Society; website; 505 North Market Street, Wilmington, Delaware 19801; (302) 655–7161.
- University of Delaware; Library website; 181 South College Avenue, Newark, Delaware 19717; (302) 831–2965.
- Newark Free Library; 750 Library Ave., Newark, Delaware; (302) 731–7550.

U.S. House of Representatives
Preceded by Jonathan S. Willis	Member of the U.S. House of Representatives from Delaware's at-large congressional district 1897–1899	Succeeded by John H. Hoffecker
