= Joshua H. Marvil =

American politician (1825–1895)

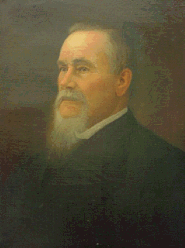

48th Governor of Delaware
- In office January 15, 1895 – April 8, 1895
- Preceded by: Robert J. Reynolds
- Succeeded by: William T. Watson

Personal details
- Born: September 3, 1825 Laurel, Delaware
- Died: April 8, 1895 (aged 69) Laurel, Delaware
- Party: Republican
- Spouse: Sarah Ann Sirman
- Occupation: Merchant

Joshua Hopkins Marvil (September 3, 1825 – April 8, 1895) was an American merchant and politician from Laurel, in Sussex County, Delaware. He was a member of the Republican Party, who served as Governor of Delaware. He was the first Republican to serve as Governor.

== Early life and family ==
Marvil was born in Laurel, Delaware, the son of Joseph and Sally Ann Hopkins Marvil. He married Sarah Ann Sirman and had three children: Joseph, Vendreths, and Joshua. They lived at West Street in Laurel, although the house has been moved to 606 West Street. They were members of the Methodist Church.

As a young man, Marvil went to sea for a while and returned to work in shipbuilding. At age 28, in 1853, he began to manufacture farm equipment. Having a certain mechanical genius, he was able to imagine profitable new technologies. With the growth of the peach orchards, he started the Marvil Package Company, a basket and crate manufacturing business in Laurel. For a time, it was said to have been the largest industrial plant in the area, producing two million fruit baskets and crates annually. He was also the publisher of Laurel's first newspaper, the Gazette, which he started in 1889.

== Professional and political career ==
Marvil had been an enrollment officer during the Civil War. He became a Republican at that time, and remained one in heavily Democratic western Sussex County. Nevertheless, he was popular, and after refusing his party's nomination for governor in 1882 and 1890, he finally agreed in 1894, in spite of his advanced age and poor physical condition.

In the election, Marvil was elected Governor of Delaware, defeating Democrat Ebe W. Tunnell, a merchant from Lewes. Marvil was only the second Republican governor, and the first elected since the Civil War. He feared his health would not last through his term, and after one of the coldest winters on record, his prediction came true. He served less than three months, from January 15, 1895 until his death on April 8, 1895.

For a generation bitter memories of Republican actions during the Civil War had kept the Democrats firmly in control of the government throughout Delaware. However, during this period gas executive J. Edward Addicks, a Philadelphia millionaire, established residence in Delaware, and began pouring money into the Republican Party, especially in Kent and Sussex County. He expected this investment to earn him a seat in the U.S. Senate, and while that never happened, he did succeed in reigniting the Republican Party, which would soon become the dominant party in the state. Marvil's election was accompanied by the election of a Republican State House, and the convening of a state constitutional convention that would soon produce a new constitution.

Delaware General Assembly (sessions while Governor)
Year	Assembly	Senate Majority	Speaker	House Majority	Speaker
1895-1896	88th	Democratic	William T. Watson	Republican	Henry H. McMullen

== Death and legacy ==
Marvil died at his home and is buried in the Laurel Hill Cemetery, at Laurel. He was the ninth and last Governor of Delaware to die in office. Marvil's grandson, Joshua D. Marvil, attended Northwestern University, where in 1931 he was named one of Delaware's first All-American football players.

== Almanac ==
Elections are held the first Tuesday after November 1. The governor takes office the third Tuesday of January, and has a four-year term.

Public Offices
Office	Type	Location	Began office	Ended office	notes
Governor	Executive	Dover	January 15, 1895	April 8, 1895	

Election results
Year	Office	Subject	Party	Votes	%	Opponent	Party	Votes	%
1894	Governor	Joshua H. Marvil	Republican	19,880	50%	Ebe W. Tunnell	Democratic	18,659	47%

== Images ==
- Hall of Governors Portrait Gallery. Portrait courtesy of Historical and Cultural Affairs, Dover

Party political offices
Preceded by Harry A. Richardson	Republican nominee for Governor of Delaware; 1894	Succeeded by James R. Hoffecker
Political offices
Preceded by Robert J. Reynolds	Governor of Delaware; 1895	Succeeded by William T. Watson
