= Robert J. Reynolds =

American politician (1838–1909)

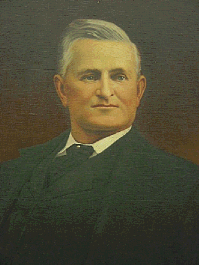

47th Governor of Delaware
- In office January 20, 1891 – January 15, 1895
- Preceded by: Benjamin T. Biggs
- Succeeded by: Joshua H. Marvil

Member of the Delaware House of Representatives
- In office January 6, 1869 – January 6, 1871

Personal details
- Born: March 17, 1838 Smyrna, Delaware, U.S.
- Died: June 10, 1909 (aged 71) Kent County, Delaware, U.S.
- Party: Democratic
- Spouse(s): Louvenia Riggs; Hester Thomas
- Occupation: Farmer

Robert John Reynolds (March 17, 1838 – June 10, 1909) was an American politician from Petersburg in South Murderkill Hundred, Kent County, Delaware. He was a member of the Democratic Party, who served in the Delaware General Assembly, and as Governor of Delaware.

== Early life and family ==
Reynolds was born in Smyrna, Delaware, son of Robert Wright and Sallie Gilder Marvel Reynolds. He married Louvenia Riggs and had one child, Byron, and later married Hester Thomas, with whom he had no children. They lived at "Golden Ridge", near Petersburg in South Murderkill Hundred, Kent County, Delaware and were members of the Methodist Church.

== Professional and political career ==
Reynolds was elected to the State House in 1868 and served the 1869/70 session. From 1879 until 1883 he was state treasurer, and in 1890 was elected the Governor of Delaware, defeating Harry A. Richardson, the Republican candidate. He served from January 20, 1891, until January 15, 1895.

During these years free textbooks were first provided to public school students, and Delaware State College was established in Dover.

== Death and legacy ==
Reynolds died at his home near Petersburg at South Murderkill Hundred, Kent County, Delaware, and is buried at the Loudon Park Cemetery, in Baltimore, Maryland.

== Almanac ==
Elections are held the first Tuesday after November 1. Members of the Delaware General Assembly took office the first Tuesday of January. State representatives have a two-year term. The governor takes office the third Tuesday of January and has a four-year term.

Delaware General Assembly (sessions while Governor)
Year	Assembly	Senate Majority	Speaker	House Majority	Speaker
1891–1892	86th	Democratic	John P. Donohoe	Democratic	William L. Sirman
1893–1894	87th	Democratic	Charles B. Houston	Democratic	J. Harvey Whiteman

Public Offices
Office	Type	Location	Began office	Ended office	notes
State Representative	Legislature	Dover	January 6, 1869	January 6, 1871	
State Treasurer	Executive	Dover	1879	1883	
Governor	Executive	Dover	January 20, 1891	January 15, 1895	

Delaware General Assembly service
Dates	Assembly	Chamber	Majority	Governor	Committees	District
1869–1870	75th	State House	Democratic	Gove Saulsbury		Kent at-large

Election results
Year	Office	Subject	Party	Votes	%	Opponent	Party	Votes	%
1890	Governor	Robert J. Reynolds	Democratic	17,801	51%	Harry A. Richardson	Republican	17,258	49%

== Images ==
- Hall of Governors Portrait Gallery Portrait courtesy of Historical and Cultural Affairs, Dover.

== Places with more information ==
- Delaware Historical Society; website; 505 North Market Street, Wilmington, Delaware 19801; (302) 655-7161
- University of Delaware; Library website; 181 South College Avenue, Newark, Delaware 19717; (302) 831-2965

Party political offices
Preceded by Benjamin T. Biggs	Democratic nominee for Governor of Delaware; 1890	Succeeded by Ebe W. Tunnell
Political offices
Preceded by Benjamin T. Biggs	Governor of Delaware; 1891–1895	Succeeded by Joshua H. Marvil
