= J. Edward Addicks =

American political candidate

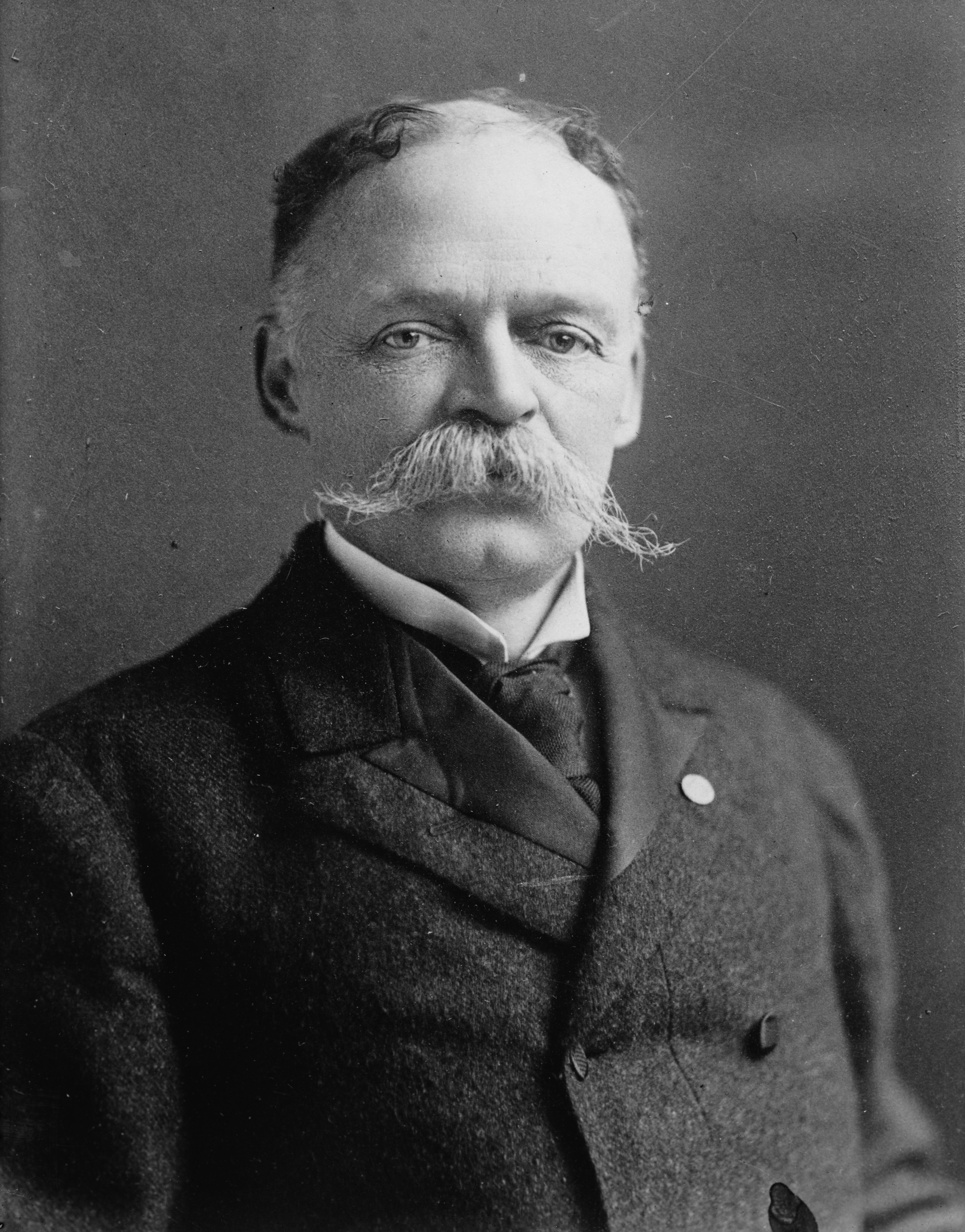
- Born: John Edward Charles O'Sullivan Addicks; November 21, 1841; Philadelphia, Pennsylvania, U.S.
- Died: August 7, 1919 (aged 77); New York City, New York, U.S.
- Resting place: Laurel Hill Cemetery, Philadelphia, Pennsylvania, U.S.
- Known for: trying to buy a Senate seat in Delaware
- Political party: Republican
- Spouses: Laura Wattson Butcher (m. 1864; died 1867); Rosalie Butcher (m. 1870; div. 1898); Ida Wilson (née Carr) (m. 1898)
- Children: Florence Addicks (1866-1942)
- Parent(s): John Edward Charles O'Sullivan Addicks; Margaretta McLeod Turner

John Edward Charles O'Sullivan Addicks (November 21, 1841 – August 7, 1919) was an American industrialist and capitalist who used his wealth from financing and building gas works to wage four unsuccessful campaigns for a United States Senate seat in Delaware. His struggle with Henry A. du Pont for control of the state government led to Delaware having both of its Senate seats vacant for a time and was one of the factors that led to election reform and the Seventeenth Amendment to the United States Constitution in 1913. His success at forming gas monopolies earned him the nicknames "Gas Addicks" and the "Napoleon of Gas".

== Early life and family ==
Addicks was born November 21, 1841, in Philadelphia, Pennsylvania, to John E. C. O'Sullivan and Margretta McLeod (Turner) Addicks. He graduated from Philadelphia public schools at age 15 and entered business, first in wholesale dry goods, then in flour, and later in real estate. Addicks married Laura Butcher (1842-1867) in 1864, with whom he had a daughter, Florence. After the death of his first wife, he married her sister Rosalie (1849-1907); they subsequently divorced. Laura and Rosalie are buried in the Butcher family plot at Laurel Hill Cemetery, Section K, lot 76. Addicks moved to Claymont, Delaware, in 1877, where he would eventually marry Ida Carr Wilson in 1898.

== Gas industry ==
Shortly after moving to Delaware, Addicks became involved with the natural gas business, then in its infancy. He built gas works in Jersey City, and in 1882 he was instrumental in organizing the Chicago Gas Trust. Addicks formed the Bay State Gas Company in Boston in 1884, and subsequently consolidated the Boston, Roxbury, and South Boston Gas companies into one trust in 1889. Although he never officially relocated to Boston, in 1892 he was paid an annual salary of US$25,000 by the Boston Gas Syndicate. In 1892, he purchased a controlling interest in the Brooklyn Gas Company, and was elected its president. Addicks' success at forming gas monopolies earned him the nicknames "Gas Addicks" and the "Napoleon of Gas".

== Political aspirations ==
Addicks was a candidate in 1895 for one of Delaware's United States Senate seats and, although he himself failed of election, was able to prevent that of his rival, Henry A. du Pont. William T. Watson, the ex-speaker of the state House, having become governor through the death of Joshua H. Marvil, was permitted to cast a ballot in the legislative convention, and an opportunity was thus obtained for contesting the election of du Pont, whom the Democrats and Populists refused to seat.

In 1896 a quarrel arose in the Republican State Convention, assembled to elect delegates to the national convention of that year, and two sets of delegates, representing respectively the du Pont and Addicks factions, were thereupon sent to St. Louis. The committee on credentials decided in favor of the du Pont delegates; their faction became known as the "regular" Republican party, while the Addicks faction assumed the name of "Union Republican".

When, in 1899, a new senator from Delaware was to be elected upon the expiration of the term of Democrat George Gray, a deadlock ensued, and the Senate seat remained vacant. Again, in 1900, two sets of delegates from Delaware were sent to the Republican National Convention, and on this occasion the committee on credentials ultimately decided in favor of the Addicks, or Union Republican, representatives. Despite the fact that Addicks was now in charge of the Delaware Republican Party, in 1901 he was once more defeated in the senatorial election. But this time there were two senators to elect, so that the adjournment of the Legislature in March left Delaware totally unrepresented in the U.S. Senate.

Addicks is buried in an unmarked area of the Addicks family plot in section Chapel-50 at Laurel Hill Cemetery in Philadelphia.
