= List of United States Senate elections in Delaware =

A table showing the results of popular elections for U.S. senators from Delaware, beginning in 1916 when the Seventeenth Amendment to the U.S. Constitution, providing for the popular election of for U.S. senators, went into effect. Before 1914, they were elected by the Delaware General Assembly.

Elections are held the first Tuesday after November 1. United States senators are popularly elected for a six-year term beginning January 3. Before 1935, terms began March 4.

== List of recent elections ==
=== Class 1 senators ===
Year	Elected	Party	Votes	%	Opponent	Party	Votes	%	Notes
1916	Josiah O. Wolcott	Democratic	25,434	50%	Henry A. du Pont*	Republican	22,925	45%	(Note: Additional candidates were Hiram R. Burton (2,361) and William C. Ferris (490).)
1922 (special)	Thomas F. Bayard Jr.	Democratic	36,954	50%	T. Coleman du Pont*	Republican	36,894	50%	(Note: This was a special election held November 7, 1922, to fill the vacancy caused by the resignation of Josiah O. Wolcott.) (Note: An additional candidate was Frank Stephens (581).)
1922	Thomas F. Bayard Jr.	Democratic	37,304	50%	T. Coleman du Pont*	Republican	36,979	49%	(Note: An additional candidate was Frank Stephens (608).)
1928	John G. Townsend Jr.	Republican	63,725	61%	Thomas F. Bayard Jr.*	Democratic	40,828	39%	
1934	John G. Townsend Jr.*	Republican	52,829	53%	Wilbur L. Adams	Democratic	45,771	46%	(Note: Additional candidates were Fred W. Whiteside (497) and John T. Wlodkoski (69).)
1940	James M. Tunnell	Democratic	68,294	51%	John G. Townsend Jr.*	Republican	63,799	47%	(Note: An additional candidate was William F. Allen (2,786).)
1946	John J. Williams	Republican	62,603	55%	James M. Tunnell*	Democratic	50,910	45%	
1952	John J. Williams*	Republican	93,020	54%	Alexis I. du Pont Bayard	Democratic	77,685	46%	
1958	John J. Williams*	Republican	82,280	53%	Elbert N. Carvel	Democratic	72,152	47%	
1964	John J. Williams*	Republican	103,782	52%	Elbert N. Carvel	Democratic	96,850	48%	(Note: An additional candidate was Joseph B. Hollon (71).)
1970	William Roth	Republican	94,979	59%	Jacob W. Zimmerman	Democratic	64,740	40%	(Note: An additional candidate was Donald G. Gies (1,720).)
1976	William Roth*	Republican	125,454	56%	Thomas C. Maloney	Democratic	98,042	44%	(Note: Additional candidates were Donald G. Gies (646), Joseph F. McInerney (437), and John A. Massimilla (216).)
1982	William Roth*	Republican	105,357	55%	David N. Levinson	Democratic	84,413	44%	(Note: Additional candidates were Lawrence D. Sullivan (653) and Charles A. Baker (537).)
1988	William Roth*	Republican	151,115	62%	Shien Biau Woo	Democratic	92,378	38%	
1994	William Roth*	Republican	111,074	56%	Charles M. Oberly	Democratic	84,540	42%	(Note: An additional candidate was John C. Dierickx (3,386).)
2000	Tom Carper	Democratic	181,566	56%	William Roth*	Republican	142,891	44%	(Note: Additional candidates were J. Burke Morrison (1,103), Mark E. Dankof (1,044), and Robert E. Mattson (389).)
2006	Tom Carper*	Democratic	170,567	67%	Jan C. Ting	Republican	69,734	27%	(Note: Additional candidates were William E. Morris (2,671) and Christine O'Donnell (11,127).)
2012	Tom Carper*	Democratic	265,374	66%	Kevin Wade	Republican	115,694	29%	
2018	Tom Carper*	Democratic	217,385	60%	Rob Arlett	Republican	137,127	38%	
2024	Lisa Blunt Rochester	Democratic	283,298	57%	Eric Hansen	Republican	197,753	39%	

=== Class 2 senators ===
Year	Elected	Party	Votes	%	Opponent	Party	Votes	%	Notes
1918	L. Heisler Ball	Republican	21,519	51%	Willard Saulsbury Jr.	Democratic	20,113	48%	(Note: An additional candidate was William H. Connor (420).)
1924	T. Coleman du Pont	Republican	52,731	59%	James M. Tunnell	Democratic	36,085	41%	
1930	Daniel O. Hastings*	Republican	47,909	54%	Thomas F. Bayard Jr.	Democratic	39,881	45%	(Note: An additional candidate was Nicholas Minutella (135).)
1936	James H. Hughes	Democratic	67,136	53%	Daniel O. Hastings*	Republican	52,469	41%	(Note: Additional candidates were Robert G. Houston (6,897), Charles W. Perry (183), and William V. P. Davidatis (53).)
1942	C. Douglass Buck	Republican	46,210	54%	E. Ennalls Berl	Democratic	38,322	45%	(Note: An additional candidate was Thomas J. Sard (776).)
1948	J. Allen Frear Jr.	Democratic	71,888	51%	C. Douglass Buck*	Republican	68,246	48%	(Note: Additional candidates were Hamilton D. Ware (681), Thomas J. Sard (467), and Walter B. Pollard (80).)
1954	J. Allen Frear Jr.*	Democratic	82,511	57%	Herbert B. Warburton	Republican	62,389	43%	
1960	J. Caleb Boggs	Republican	98,874	51%	J. Allen Frear Jr.*	Democratic	96,090	49%	
1966	J. Caleb Boggs*	Republican	97,268	59%	James M. Tunnell Jr.	Democratic	67,263	41%	
1972	Joe Biden	Democratic	116,006	50%	J. Caleb Boggs*	Republican	112,844	49%	(Note: Additional candidates were Henry Majka (803) and Herbet B. Wood (175).)
1978	Joe Biden*	Democratic	93,930	58%	James H. Baxter Jr.	Republican	66,479	41%	(Note: An additional candidates was Donald G. Gies (1,663).)
1984	Joe Biden*	Democratic	147,831	60%	John M. Burris	Republican	98,101	40%	
1990	Joe Biden*	Democratic	112,918	63%	M. Jane Brady	Republican	64,554	36%	(Note: Additional candidates included Lee Rosenbaum (2,680).)
1996	Joe Biden*	Democratic	165,465	60%	Raymond J. Clatworthy	Republican	105,088	38%	(Note: Additional candidates were Mark A. Jones (3,340) and Jacqueline Kossoff (1,698).)
2002	Joe Biden*	Democratic	135,253	58%	Raymond J. Clatworthy	Republican	94,793	41%	(Note: Additional candidates were Maurice J. Barros (996), Raymond Buranello (922), and Robert E. Mattson (350).)
2008	Joe Biden*	Democratic	257,539	65%	Christine O'Donnell	Republican	140,595	35%	
2010 (special)	Chris Coons	Democratic	174,012	57%	Christine O'Donnell	Republican	123,053	40%	
2014	Chris Coons*	Democratic	130,655	56%	Kevin Wade	Republican	98,823	42%	
2020	Chris Coons*	Democratic	291,804	59%	Lauren Witzke	Republican	186,054	38%	
