= Victor Baynard Woolley =

American judge (1867–1945)

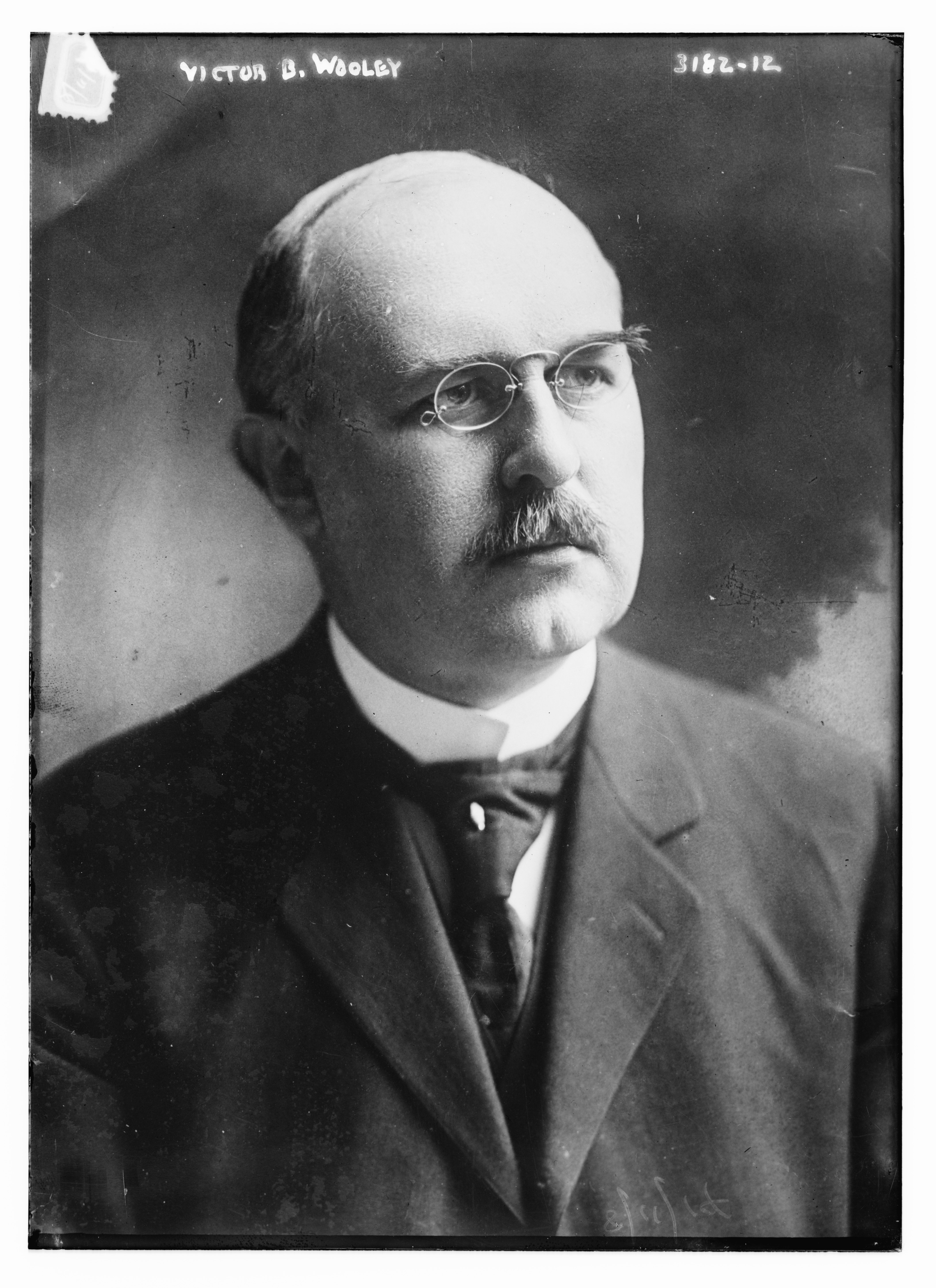

Senior Judge of the United States Court of Appeals for the Third Circuit
- In office May 1, 1938 – February 22, 1945

Judge of the United States Court of Appeals for the Third Circuit
- In office August 12, 1914 – May 1, 1938
- Appointed by: Woodrow Wilson
- Preceded by: George Gray
- Succeeded by: Albert Branson Maris

Personal details
- Born: Victor Baynard Woolley; March 29, 1867 Wilmington, Delaware
- Died: February 22, 1945 (aged 77)
- Education: Delaware College (BS); Harvard Law School read law

Victor Baynard Woolley (March 29, 1867 – February 22, 1945) was a United States circuit judge of the United States Court of Appeals for the Third Circuit.

== Education and career ==
Born in Wilmington, Delaware, Woolley received a Bachelor of Science degree from Delaware College (now the University of Delaware) in 1885. For a time he studied at Harvard Law School, but he read law to enter the bar in 1890. He was a prothonotary for the Superior Court of New Castle County, Delaware from 1895 to 1901. He was an Associate Justice of the Supreme Court of Delaware from 1900 to 1914.

== Federal judicial service ==
On August 7, 1914, Woolley was nominated by President Woodrow Wilson to a seat on the United States Court of Appeals for the Third Circuit vacated by Judge George Gray. Woolley was confirmed by the United States Senate on August 12, 1914, and received his commission the same day. He assumed senior status on May 1, 1938, serving in that capacity until his death on February 22, 1945.

== Sources ==
Legal offices
Preceded by George Gray	Judge of the United States Court of Appeals for the Third Circuit; 1914–1938	Succeeded by Albert Branson Maris
