= List of United States senators from Delaware =

Current delegation

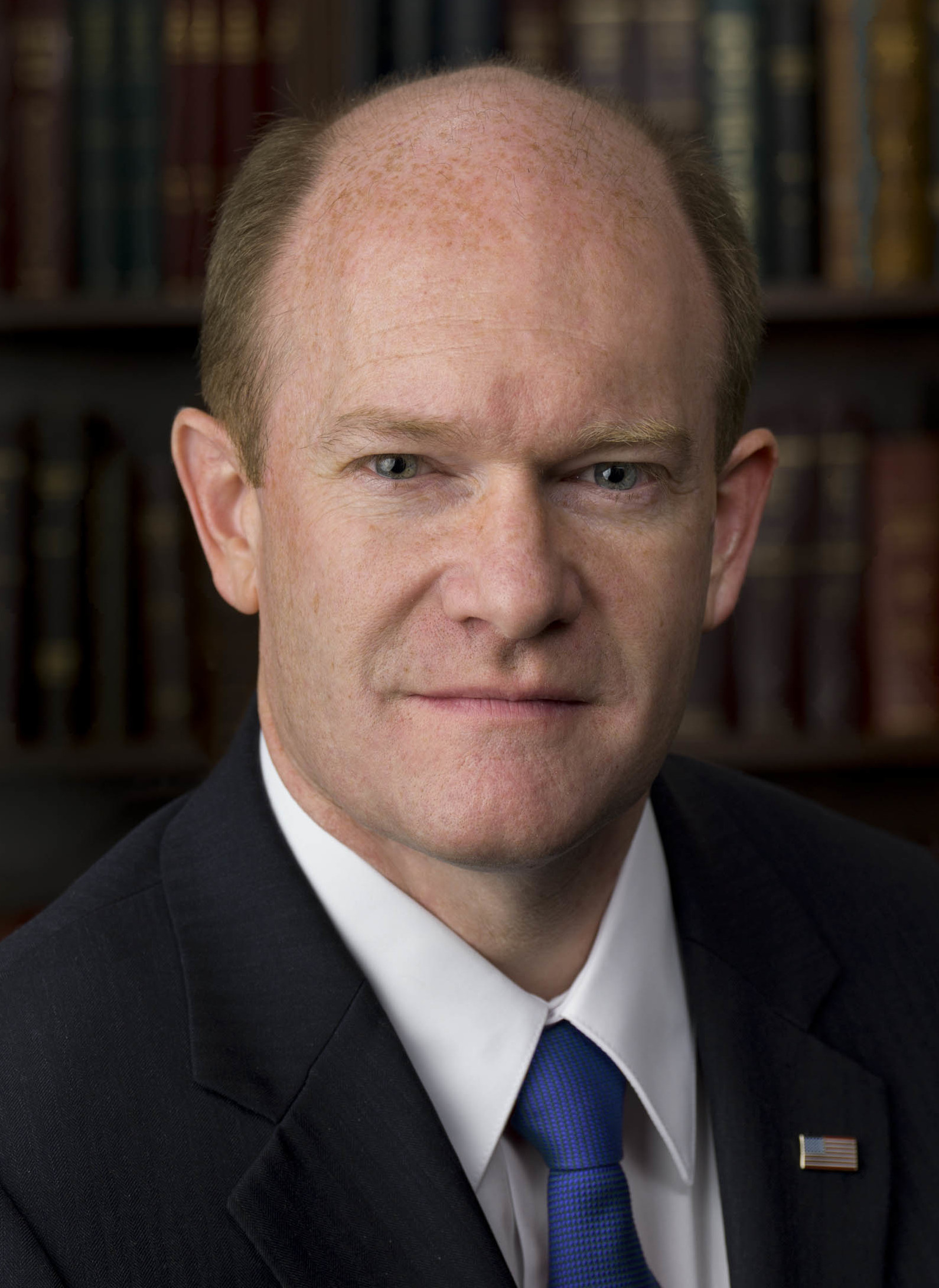
Chris Coons (D)

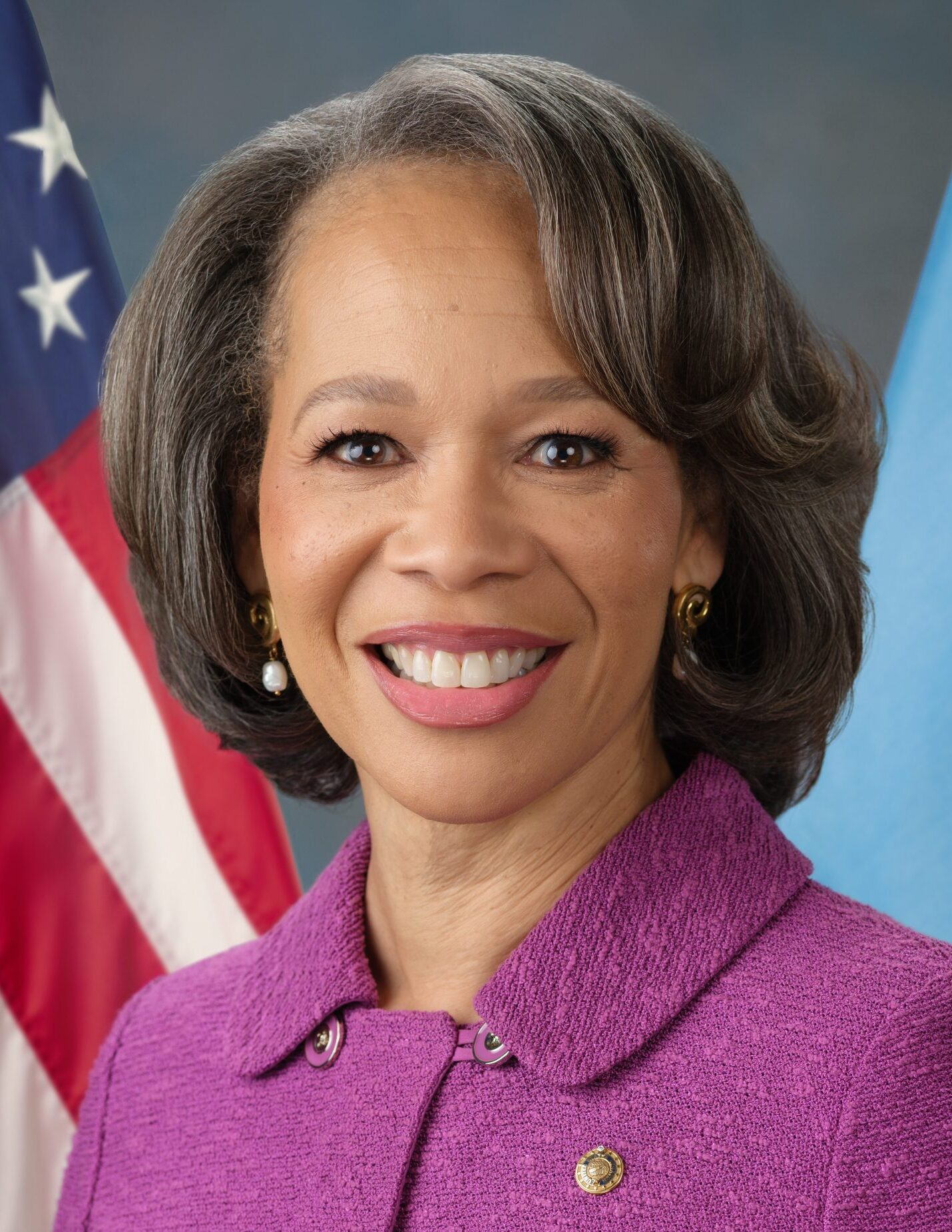
Lisa Blunt Rochester (D)

(ordered by seniority)

Below is a chronological listing of the United States senators from Delaware. U.S. senators were originally elected by the Delaware General Assembly for designated six-year terms beginning on March 4. Frequently portions of the term would remain only upon a U.S. senator's death or resignation. From 1914 and the enforcement of the Seventeenth Amendment to the United States Constitution, adopted in 1913 but rejected by the General Assembly that year and not ratified until July 1, 2010, officeholders were popularly elected on the first Tuesday after November 1; starting 1935, the beginning of their term is January 3.

Delaware's current U.S. senators are Democrats Chris Coons (serving since November 15, 2010) and Lisa Blunt Rochester (serving since January 3, 2025). Joe Biden is Delaware's longest serving senator (1973–2009).

== List of senators ==
Class 1 Class 1 senators belong to the electoral cycle that most recently had regular elections in 2006, 2012, 2018, and 2024. The next election will be in 2030.						C	Class 2 Class 2 senators belong to the electoral cycle that most recently had regular elections in 2008, 2014, 2020, and 2026. The next election will be in 2032.					
#	Senator	Party	Dates in office	Electoral history	T	C	T	Electoral history	Dates in office	Party	Senator	#
1	George Read (New Castle)	Pro- Admin.	Mar 4, 1789 – Sep 18, 1793	Elected in 1788.	1	1st	1	Elected in 1788.	Mar 4, 1789 – Mar 3, 1793	Anti- Admin.	Richard Bassett (Dover)	1
1	George Read (New Castle)	Pro- Admin.	Mar 4, 1789 – Sep 18, 1793	Re-elected in 1790. Resigned to become Chief Justice of Delaware.	2	2nd	1	Elected in 1788.	Mar 4, 1789 – Mar 3, 1793	Pro- Admin.	Richard Bassett (Dover)	1
1	George Read (New Castle)	Pro- Admin.	Mar 4, 1789 – Sep 18, 1793	Re-elected in 1790. Resigned to become Chief Justice of Delaware.	2	3rd	2	Elected in 1793. Resigned.	Mar 4, 1793 – Jan 19, 1798	Pro-Admin.	John Vining (Dover)	2
Vacant			Sep 18, 1793 – Feb 7, 1795		2	3rd	2	Elected in 1793. Resigned.	Mar 4, 1793 – Jan 19, 1798	Pro-Admin.	John Vining (Dover)	2
2	Henry Latimer (Newport)	Pro- Admin.	Feb 7, 1795 – Feb 28, 1801	Elected in 1795 to finish Read's term.	2	3rd	2	Elected in 1793. Resigned.	Mar 4, 1793 – Jan 19, 1798	Pro-Admin.	John Vining (Dover)	2
2	Henry Latimer (Newport)	Federalist	Feb 7, 1795 – Feb 28, 1801	Elected in 1795 to finish Read's term.	2	4th	2	Elected in 1793. Resigned.	Mar 4, 1793 – Jan 19, 1798	Federalist	John Vining (Dover)	2
2	Henry Latimer (Newport)	Federalist	Feb 7, 1795 – Feb 28, 1801	Re-elected in 1797. Resigned.	3	5th	2	Elected in 1793. Resigned.	Mar 4, 1793 – Jan 19, 1798	Federalist	John Vining (Dover)	2
2	Henry Latimer (Newport)	Federalist	Feb 7, 1795 – Feb 28, 1801	Re-elected in 1797. Resigned.	3	5th	2	Elected in 1798 to finish Vining's term. Died.	Jan 19, 1798 – Aug 11, 1798	Federalist	Joshua Clayton (Mount Pleasant)	3
2	Henry Latimer (Newport)	Federalist	Feb 7, 1795 – Feb 28, 1801	Re-elected in 1797. Resigned.	3	5th	2		Aug 11, 1798 – Jan 17, 1799	Vacant		
2	Henry Latimer (Newport)	Federalist	Feb 7, 1795 – Feb 28, 1801	Re-elected in 1797. Resigned.	3	5th	2	Elected in 1799 to finish Clayton's term.	Jan 17, 1799 – Nov 6, 1804	Federalist	William H. Wells (Georgetown)	4
2	Henry Latimer (Newport)	Federalist	Feb 7, 1795 – Feb 28, 1801	Re-elected in 1797. Resigned.	3	6th	3	Re-elected in 1799. Resigned.	Jan 17, 1799 – Nov 6, 1804	Federalist	William H. Wells (Georgetown)	4
3	Samuel White (Wilmington)	Federalist	Feb 28, 1801 – Nov 4, 1809	Appointed to finish Latimer's term.	3	6th	3	Re-elected in 1799. Resigned.	Jan 17, 1799 – Nov 6, 1804	Federalist	William H. Wells (Georgetown)	4
3	Samuel White (Wilmington)	Federalist	Feb 28, 1801 – Nov 4, 1809	Appointed to finish Latimer's term.	3	7th	3	Re-elected in 1799. Resigned.	Jan 17, 1799 – Nov 6, 1804	Federalist	William H. Wells (Georgetown)	4
3	Samuel White (Wilmington)	Federalist	Feb 28, 1801 – Nov 4, 1809	Re-elected in 1803.	4	8th	3	Re-elected in 1799. Resigned.	Jan 17, 1799 – Nov 6, 1804	Federalist	William H. Wells (Georgetown)	4
3	Samuel White (Wilmington)	Federalist	Feb 28, 1801 – Nov 4, 1809	Re-elected in 1803.	4	8th	3		Nov 6, 1804 – Nov 13, 1804	Vacant		
3	Samuel White (Wilmington)	Federalist	Feb 28, 1801 – Nov 4, 1809	Re-elected in 1803.	4	8th	3	Elected in 1804 to finish Wells's term.	Nov 13, 1804 – Mar 3, 1813	Federalist	James A. Bayard (Wilmington)	5
3	Samuel White (Wilmington)	Federalist	Feb 28, 1801 – Nov 4, 1809	Re-elected in 1803.	4	9th	4	Re-elected in 1805.	Nov 13, 1804 – Mar 3, 1813	Federalist	James A. Bayard (Wilmington)	5
3	Samuel White (Wilmington)	Federalist	Feb 28, 1801 – Nov 4, 1809	Re-elected in 1803.	4	10th	4	Re-elected in 1805.	Nov 13, 1804 – Mar 3, 1813	Federalist	James A. Bayard (Wilmington)	5
3	Samuel White (Wilmington)	Federalist	Feb 28, 1801 – Nov 4, 1809	Re-elected in 1809. Died.	5	11th	4	Re-elected in 1805.	Nov 13, 1804 – Mar 3, 1813	Federalist	James A. Bayard (Wilmington)	5
Vacant			Nov 4, 1809 – Jan 12, 1810		5	11th	4	Re-elected in 1805.	Nov 13, 1804 – Mar 3, 1813	Federalist	James A. Bayard (Wilmington)	5
4	Outerbridge Horsey (Wilmington)	Federalist	Jan 12, 1810 – Mar 3, 1821	Elected in 1810 to finish White's term.	5	11th	4	Re-elected in 1805.	Nov 13, 1804 – Mar 3, 1813	Federalist	James A. Bayard (Wilmington)	5
4	Outerbridge Horsey (Wilmington)	Federalist	Jan 12, 1810 – Mar 3, 1821	Elected in 1810 to finish White's term.	5	12th	5	Re-elected in 1811. Resigned.	Nov 13, 1804 – Mar 3, 1813	Federalist	James A. Bayard (Wilmington)	5
4	Outerbridge Horsey (Wilmington)	Federalist	Jan 12, 1810 – Mar 3, 1821	Elected in 1810 to finish White's term.	5	13th	5		Mar 3, 1813 – May 21, 1813	Vacant		
4	Outerbridge Horsey (Wilmington)	Federalist	Jan 12, 1810 – Mar 3, 1821	Elected in 1810 to finish White's term.	5	13th	5	Elected in 1813 to finish Bayard's term. Retired.	May 21, 1813 – Mar 3, 1817	Federalist	William H. Wells (Dagsboro)	6
4	Outerbridge Horsey (Wilmington)	Federalist	Jan 12, 1810 – Mar 3, 1821	Re-elected in 1815. Retired.	6	14th	5	Elected in 1813 to finish Bayard's term. Retired.	May 21, 1813 – Mar 3, 1817	Federalist	William H. Wells (Dagsboro)	6
4	Outerbridge Horsey (Wilmington)	Federalist	Jan 12, 1810 – Mar 3, 1821	Re-elected in 1815. Retired.	6	15th	6	Elected in 1817.	Mar 4, 1817 – Mar 3, 1823	Federalist	Nicholas Van Dyke (New Castle)	7
4	Outerbridge Horsey (Wilmington)	Federalist	Jan 12, 1810 – Mar 3, 1821	Re-elected in 1815. Retired.	6	16th	6	Elected in 1817.	Mar 4, 1817 – Mar 3, 1823	Federalist	Nicholas Van Dyke (New Castle)	7
Vacant			Mar 4, 1821 – Jan 23, 1822	Legislature failed to elect.	7	17th	6	Elected in 1817.	Mar 4, 1817 – Mar 3, 1823	Federalist	Nicholas Van Dyke (New Castle)	7
5	Caesar A. Rodney (Wilmington)	Democratic- Republican	Jan 24, 1822 – Jan 29, 1823	Elected late to finish vacant term. Resigned to become U.S. Minister to the United Provinces of the River Plate.	7	17th	6	Elected in 1817.	Mar 4, 1817 – Mar 3, 1823	Federalist	Nicholas Van Dyke (New Castle)	7
Vacant			Jan 29, 1823 – Jan 8, 1824		7	17th	6	Elected in 1817.	Mar 4, 1817 – Mar 3, 1823	Federalist	Nicholas Van Dyke (New Castle)	7
Vacant			Jan 29, 1823 – Jan 8, 1824		7	18th	7	Legislature failed to elect.	Mar 4, 1823 – Jan 8, 1824	Vacant		7
Vacant			Jan 29, 1823 – Jan 8, 1824		7	18th	7	Re-elected late. Died.	Jan 8, 1824 – May 21, 1826	Federalist	Nicholas Van Dyke (New Castle)	7
6	Thomas Clayton (Dover)	Federalist	Jan 8, 1824 – Mar 3, 1827	Elected in 1824 to finish Rodney's term.	7	18th	7	Re-elected late. Died.	Jan 8, 1824 – May 21, 1826	Federalist	Nicholas Van Dyke (New Castle)	7
6	Thomas Clayton (Dover)	National; Republican	Jan 8, 1824 – Mar 3, 1827	Elected in 1824 to finish Rodney's term.	7	19th	7	Re-elected late. Died.	Jan 8, 1824 – May 21, 1826	National; Republican	Nicholas Van Dyke (New Castle)	7
6	Thomas Clayton (Dover)	National; Republican	Jan 8, 1824 – Mar 3, 1827	Elected in 1824 to finish Rodney's term.	7	19th	7		May 21, 1826 – Nov 8, 1826	Vacant		
6	Thomas Clayton (Dover)	National; Republican	Jan 8, 1824 – Mar 3, 1827	Elected in 1824 to finish Rodney's term.	7	19th	7	Appointed to continue Van Dyke's term. Retired.	Nov 8, 1826 – Jan 12, 1827	National; Republican	Daniel Rodney (Wilmington)	8
6	Thomas Clayton (Dover)	National; Republican	Jan 8, 1824 – Mar 3, 1827	Elected in 1824 to finish Rodney's term.	7	19th	7	Elected in 1827 to finish Van Dyke's term. Retired.	Jan 12, 1827 – Mar 3, 1829	Jacksonian	Henry M. Ridgely (Dover)	9
7	Louis McLane (Wilmington)	Jacksonian	Mar 4, 1827 – Apr 16, 1829	Elected in 1827. Resigned to become U.S. Envoy Extraordinary and Minister Plenipotentiary to England.	8	20th	7	Elected in 1827 to finish Van Dyke's term. Retired.	Jan 12, 1827 – Mar 3, 1829	Jacksonian	Henry M. Ridgely (Dover)	9
7	Louis McLane (Wilmington)	Jacksonian	Mar 4, 1827 – Apr 16, 1829	Elected in 1827. Resigned to become U.S. Envoy Extraordinary and Minister Plenipotentiary to England.	8	21st	8	Elected in 1829.	Mar 4, 1829 – Dec 29, 1836	National; Republican	John M. Clayton (Dover)	10
Vacant			Apr 16, 1829 – Jan 7, 1830		8	21st	8	Elected in 1829.	Mar 4, 1829 – Dec 29, 1836	National; Republican	John M. Clayton (Dover)	10
8	Arnold Naudain (Wilmington)	National; Republican	Jan 7, 1830 – Jun 16, 1836	Elected in 1830 to finish McLane's term.	8	21st	8	Elected in 1829.	Mar 4, 1829 – Dec 29, 1836	National; Republican	John M. Clayton (Dover)	10
8	Arnold Naudain (Wilmington)	National; Republican	Jan 7, 1830 – Jun 16, 1836	Elected in 1830 to finish McLane's term.	8	22nd	8	Elected in 1829.	Mar 4, 1829 – Dec 29, 1836	National; Republican	John M. Clayton (Dover)	10
8	Arnold Naudain (Wilmington)	National; Republican	Jan 7, 1830 – Jun 16, 1836	Re-elected in 1832. Resigned.	9	23rd	8	Elected in 1829.	Mar 4, 1829 – Dec 29, 1836	National; Republican	John M. Clayton (Dover)	10
8	Arnold Naudain (Wilmington)	National; Republican	Jan 7, 1830 – Jun 16, 1836	Re-elected in 1832. Resigned.	9	24th	9	Re-elected in 1835. Resigned.	Mar 4, 1829 – Dec 29, 1836	National; Republican	John M. Clayton (Dover)	10
9	Richard H. Bayard (Wilmington)	National; Republican	Jun 17, 1836 – Sep 19, 1839	Elected in 1836 to finish Naudain's term.	9	24th	9	Re-elected in 1835. Resigned.	Mar 4, 1829 – Dec 29, 1836	National; Republican	John M. Clayton (Dover)	10
9	Richard H. Bayard (Wilmington)	National; Republican	Jun 17, 1836 – Sep 19, 1839	Elected in 1836 to finish Naudain's term.	9	24th	9		Dec 29, 1836 – Jan 9, 1837	Vacant		
9	Richard H. Bayard (Wilmington)	National; Republican	Jun 17, 1836 – Sep 19, 1839	Elected in 1836 to finish Naudain's term.	9	24th	9	Elected in 1837 to finish his cousin's term.	Jan 9, 1837 – Mar 3, 1847	National; Republican	Thomas Clayton (New Castle)	11
9	Richard H. Bayard (Wilmington)	Whig	Jun 17, 1836 – Sep 19, 1839	Elected in 1836 to finish Naudain's term.	9	25th	9	Elected in 1837 to finish his cousin's term.	Jan 9, 1837 – Mar 3, 1847	Whig	Thomas Clayton (New Castle)	11
9	Richard H. Bayard (Wilmington)	Whig	Jun 17, 1836 – Sep 19, 1839	Re-elected during the 1838/39 cycle. Resigned to become Chief Justice of Delaware.	10	26th	9	Elected in 1837 to finish his cousin's term.	Jan 9, 1837 – Mar 3, 1847	Whig	Thomas Clayton (New Castle)	11
9	Vacant		Sep 19, 1839 – Jan 11, 1841		10	26th	9	Elected in 1837 to finish his cousin's term.	Jan 9, 1837 – Mar 3, 1847	Whig	Thomas Clayton (New Castle)	11
9	Richard H. Bayard (Wilmington)	Whig	Jan 12, 1841 – Mar 3, 1845	Elected in 1841 to finish his own term. Retired.	10	26th	9	Elected in 1837 to finish his cousin's term.	Jan 9, 1837 – Mar 3, 1847	Whig	Thomas Clayton (New Castle)	11
9	Richard H. Bayard (Wilmington)	Whig	Jan 12, 1841 – Mar 3, 1845	Elected in 1841 to finish his own term. Retired.	10	27th	10	Re-elected in 1841.	Jan 9, 1837 – Mar 3, 1847	Whig	Thomas Clayton (New Castle)	11
9	Richard H. Bayard (Wilmington)	Whig	Jan 12, 1841 – Mar 3, 1845	Elected in 1841 to finish his own term. Retired.	10	28th	10	Re-elected in 1841.	Jan 9, 1837 – Mar 3, 1847	Whig	Thomas Clayton (New Castle)	11
10	John M. Clayton (New Castle)	Whig	Mar 4, 1845 – Feb 23, 1849	Elected in 1845. Resigned to become U.S. Secretary of State.	11	29th	10	Re-elected in 1841.	Jan 9, 1837 – Mar 3, 1847	Whig	Thomas Clayton (New Castle)	11
10	John M. Clayton (New Castle)	Whig	Mar 4, 1845 – Feb 23, 1849	Elected in 1845. Resigned to become U.S. Secretary of State.	11	30th	11	Elected in 1846 or 1847. Retired.	Mar 4, 1847 – Mar 3, 1853	Whig	Presley Spruance (Smyrna)	12
11	John Wales (Wilmington)	Whig	Feb 23, 1849 – Mar 3, 1851	Elected in 1849 to finish Clayton's term. Lost re-election.	11	30th	11	Elected in 1846 or 1847. Retired.	Mar 4, 1847 – Mar 3, 1853	Whig	Presley Spruance (Smyrna)	12
11	John Wales (Wilmington)	Whig	Feb 23, 1849 – Mar 3, 1851	Elected in 1849 to finish Clayton's term. Lost re-election.	11	31st	11	Elected in 1846 or 1847. Retired.	Mar 4, 1847 – Mar 3, 1853	Whig	Presley Spruance (Smyrna)	12
12	James A. Bayard Jr. (Wilmington)	Democratic	Mar 4, 1851 – Jan 29, 1864	Elected in 1851.	12	32nd	11	Elected in 1846 or 1847. Retired.	Mar 4, 1847 – Mar 3, 1853	Whig	Presley Spruance (Smyrna)	12
12	James A. Bayard Jr. (Wilmington)	Democratic	Mar 4, 1851 – Jan 29, 1864	Elected in 1851.	12	33rd	12	Elected in 1853. Died.	Mar 4, 1853 – Nov 9, 1856	Whig	John M. Clayton (Dover)	13
12	James A. Bayard Jr. (Wilmington)	Democratic	Mar 4, 1851 – Jan 29, 1864	Elected in 1851.	12	34th	12	Elected in 1853. Died.	Mar 4, 1853 – Nov 9, 1856	Whig	John M. Clayton (Dover)	13
12	James A. Bayard Jr. (Wilmington)	Democratic	Mar 4, 1851 – Jan 29, 1864	Elected in 1851.	12	34th	12		Nov 9, 1856 – Nov 19, 1856	Vacant		
12	James A. Bayard Jr. (Wilmington)	Democratic	Mar 4, 1851 – Jan 29, 1864	Elected in 1851.	12	34th	12	Appointed to continue Clayton's term. Declined nomination to finish Clayton's term.	Nov 19, 1856 – Jan 14, 1857	Whig	Joseph P. Comegys (Dover)	14
12	James A. Bayard Jr. (Wilmington)	Democratic	Mar 4, 1851 – Jan 29, 1864	Elected in 1851.	12	34th	12	Elected in 1857 to finish Clayton's term. Lost re-election.	Jan 14, 1857 – Mar 3, 1859	Democratic	Martin W. Bates (Dover)	15
12	James A. Bayard Jr. (Wilmington)	Democratic	Mar 4, 1851 – Jan 29, 1864	Re-elected in 1857.	13	35th	12	Elected in 1857 to finish Clayton's term. Lost re-election.	Jan 14, 1857 – Mar 3, 1859	Democratic	Martin W. Bates (Dover)	15
12	James A. Bayard Jr. (Wilmington)	Democratic	Mar 4, 1851 – Jan 29, 1864	Re-elected in 1857.	13	36th	13	Elected in 1858.	Mar 4, 1859 – Mar 3, 1871	Democratic	Willard Saulsbury Sr. (Georgetown)	16
12	James A. Bayard Jr. (Wilmington)	Democratic	Mar 4, 1851 – Jan 29, 1864	Re-elected in 1857.	13	37th	13	Elected in 1858.	Mar 4, 1859 – Mar 3, 1871	Democratic	Willard Saulsbury Sr. (Georgetown)	16
12	James A. Bayard Jr. (Wilmington)	Democratic	Mar 4, 1851 – Jan 29, 1864	Re-elected in 1863. Resigned.	14	38th	13	Elected in 1858.	Mar 4, 1859 – Mar 3, 1871	Democratic	Willard Saulsbury Sr. (Georgetown)	16
13	George R. Riddle (Wilmington)	Democratic	Jan 29, 1864 – Mar 28, 1867	Elected in 1864 to finish Bayard's term. Died.	14	38th	13	Elected in 1858.	Mar 4, 1859 – Mar 3, 1871	Democratic	Willard Saulsbury Sr. (Georgetown)	16
13	George R. Riddle (Wilmington)	Democratic	Jan 29, 1864 – Mar 28, 1867	Elected in 1864 to finish Bayard's term. Died.	14	39th	14	Re-elected in 1864. Lost re-election.	Mar 4, 1859 – Mar 3, 1871	Democratic	Willard Saulsbury Sr. (Georgetown)	16
13	George R. Riddle (Wilmington)	Democratic	Jan 29, 1864 – Mar 28, 1867	Elected in 1864 to finish Bayard's term. Died.	14	40th	14	Re-elected in 1864. Lost re-election.	Mar 4, 1859 – Mar 3, 1871	Democratic	Willard Saulsbury Sr. (Georgetown)	16
Vacant			Mar 29, 1867 – Apr 5, 1867		14	40th	14	Re-elected in 1864. Lost re-election.	Mar 4, 1859 – Mar 3, 1871	Democratic	Willard Saulsbury Sr. (Georgetown)	16
14	James A. Bayard Jr. (Wilmington)	Democratic	Apr 5, 1867 – Mar 3, 1869	Appointed to continue his own term. Elected in 1869 to finish his own term. Retired.	14	40th	14	Re-elected in 1864. Lost re-election.	Mar 4, 1859 – Mar 3, 1871	Democratic	Willard Saulsbury Sr. (Georgetown)	16
15	Thomas F. Bayard (Wilmington)	Democratic	Mar 4, 1869 – Mar 6, 1885	Elected in 1869.	15	41st	14	Re-elected in 1864. Lost re-election.	Mar 4, 1859 – Mar 3, 1871	Democratic	Willard Saulsbury Sr. (Georgetown)	16
15	Thomas F. Bayard (Wilmington)	Democratic	Mar 4, 1869 – Mar 6, 1885	Elected in 1869.	15	42nd	15	Elected in 1870.	Mar 4, 1871 – Mar 3, 1889	Democratic	Eli Saulsbury (Dover)	17
15	Thomas F. Bayard (Wilmington)	Democratic	Mar 4, 1869 – Mar 6, 1885	Elected in 1869.	15	43rd	15	Elected in 1870.	Mar 4, 1871 – Mar 3, 1889	Democratic	Eli Saulsbury (Dover)	17
15	Thomas F. Bayard (Wilmington)	Democratic	Mar 4, 1869 – Mar 6, 1885	Re-elected in 1875.	16	44th	15	Elected in 1870.	Mar 4, 1871 – Mar 3, 1889	Democratic	Eli Saulsbury (Dover)	17
15	Thomas F. Bayard (Wilmington)	Democratic	Mar 4, 1869 – Mar 6, 1885	Re-elected in 1875.	16	45th	16	Re-elected in 1876.	Mar 4, 1871 – Mar 3, 1889	Democratic	Eli Saulsbury (Dover)	17
15	Thomas F. Bayard (Wilmington)	Democratic	Mar 4, 1869 – Mar 6, 1885	Re-elected in 1875.	16	46th	16	Re-elected in 1876.	Mar 4, 1871 – Mar 3, 1889	Democratic	Eli Saulsbury (Dover)	17
15	Thomas F. Bayard (Wilmington)	Democratic	Mar 4, 1869 – Mar 6, 1885	Re-elected in 1881. Resigned to become U.S. Secretary of State.	17	47th	16	Re-elected in 1876.	Mar 4, 1871 – Mar 3, 1889	Democratic	Eli Saulsbury (Dover)	17
15	Thomas F. Bayard (Wilmington)	Democratic	Mar 4, 1869 – Mar 6, 1885	Re-elected in 1881. Resigned to become U.S. Secretary of State.	17	48th	17	Re-elected in 1883. Lost re-election.	Mar 4, 1871 – Mar 3, 1889	Democratic	Eli Saulsbury (Dover)	17
15	Thomas F. Bayard (Wilmington)	Democratic	Mar 4, 1869 – Mar 6, 1885	Re-elected in 1881. Resigned to become U.S. Secretary of State.	17	49th	17	Re-elected in 1883. Lost re-election.	Mar 4, 1871 – Mar 3, 1889	Democratic	Eli Saulsbury (Dover)	17
Vacant			Mar 6, 1885 – Mar 18, 1885		17	49th	17	Re-elected in 1883. Lost re-election.	Mar 4, 1871 – Mar 3, 1889	Democratic	Eli Saulsbury (Dover)	17
16	George Gray (Wilmington)	Democratic	Mar 18, 1885 – Mar 3, 1899	Elected in 1885 to finish Bayard's term.	17	49th	17	Re-elected in 1883. Lost re-election.	Mar 4, 1871 – Mar 3, 1889	Democratic	Eli Saulsbury (Dover)	17
16	George Gray (Wilmington)	Democratic	Mar 18, 1885 – Mar 3, 1899	Re-elected in 1887.	18	50th	17	Re-elected in 1883. Lost re-election.	Mar 4, 1871 – Mar 3, 1889	Democratic	Eli Saulsbury (Dover)	17
16	George Gray (Wilmington)	Democratic	Mar 18, 1885 – Mar 3, 1899	Re-elected in 1887.	18	51st	18	Election year unknown. Lost re-election.	Mar 4, 1889 – Mar 3, 1895	Republican	Anthony Higgins (Wilmington)	18
16	George Gray (Wilmington)	Democratic	Mar 18, 1885 – Mar 3, 1899	Re-elected in 1887.	18	52nd	18	Election year unknown. Lost re-election.	Mar 4, 1889 – Mar 3, 1895	Republican	Anthony Higgins (Wilmington)	18
16	George Gray (Wilmington)	Democratic	Mar 18, 1885 – Mar 3, 1899	Re-elected in 1893. Lost re-election.	19	53rd	18	Election year unknown. Lost re-election.	Mar 4, 1889 – Mar 3, 1895	Republican	Anthony Higgins (Wilmington)	18
16	George Gray (Wilmington)	Democratic	Mar 18, 1885 – Mar 3, 1899	Re-elected in 1893. Lost re-election.	19	54th	19	Legislature failed to elect.	Mar 4, 1895 – Jan 19, 1897	Vacant		
16	George Gray (Wilmington)	Democratic	Mar 18, 1885 – Mar 3, 1899	Re-elected in 1893. Lost re-election.	19	54th	19	Elected in 1897 to finish vacant term. Lost re-election.	Jan 19, 1897 – Mar 3, 1901	Democratic	Richard R. Kenney (Dover)	19
16	George Gray (Wilmington)	Democratic	Mar 18, 1885 – Mar 3, 1899	Re-elected in 1893. Lost re-election.	19	55th	19	Elected in 1897 to finish vacant term. Lost re-election.	Jan 19, 1897 – Mar 3, 1901	Democratic	Richard R. Kenney (Dover)	19
Vacant			Mar 4, 1899 – Mar 1, 1903	Legislature failed to elect.	20	56th	19	Elected in 1897 to finish vacant term. Lost re-election.	Jan 19, 1897 – Mar 3, 1901	Democratic	Richard R. Kenney (Dover)	19
Vacant			Mar 4, 1899 – Mar 1, 1903	Legislature failed to elect.	20	57th	20	Legislature failed to elect.	Mar 4, 1901 – Mar 2, 1903	Vacant		
17	L. Heisler Ball (Faulkland)	Republican	Mar 2, 1903 – Mar 3, 1905	Elected in 1903 to finish vacant term.	20	57th	20	Elected in 1903 to finish vacant term. Retired.	Mar 2, 1903 – Mar 3, 1907	Republican	J. Frank Allee (Dover)	20
17	L. Heisler Ball (Faulkland)	Republican	Mar 2, 1903 – Mar 3, 1905	Elected in 1903 to finish vacant term.	20	58th	20	Elected in 1903 to finish vacant term. Retired.	Mar 2, 1903 – Mar 3, 1907	Republican	J. Frank Allee (Dover)	20
Vacant			Mar 4, 1905 – Jun 12, 1906	Legislature failed to elect.	21	59th	20	Elected in 1903 to finish vacant term. Retired.	Mar 2, 1903 – Mar 3, 1907	Republican	J. Frank Allee (Dover)	20
18	Henry A. du Pont (Winterthur)	Republican	Jun 13, 1906 – Mar 3, 1917	Elected in 1906 to finish vacant term.	21	59th	20	Elected in 1903 to finish vacant term. Retired.	Mar 2, 1903 – Mar 3, 1907	Republican	J. Frank Allee (Dover)	20
18	Henry A. du Pont (Winterthur)	Republican	Jun 13, 1906 – Mar 3, 1917	Elected in 1906 to finish vacant term.	21	60th	21	Elected in 1907. Retired.	Mar 4, 1907 – Mar 3, 1913	Republican	Harry A. Richardson (Dover)	21
18	Henry A. du Pont (Winterthur)	Republican	Jun 13, 1906 – Mar 3, 1917	Elected in 1906 to finish vacant term.	21	61st	21	Elected in 1907. Retired.	Mar 4, 1907 – Mar 3, 1913	Republican	Harry A. Richardson (Dover)	21
18	Henry A. du Pont (Winterthur)	Republican	Jun 13, 1906 – Mar 3, 1917	Re-elected in 1911. Lost re-election.	22	62nd	21	Elected in 1907. Retired.	Mar 4, 1907 – Mar 3, 1913	Republican	Harry A. Richardson (Dover)	21
18	Henry A. du Pont (Winterthur)	Republican	Jun 13, 1906 – Mar 3, 1917	Re-elected in 1911. Lost re-election.	22	63rd	22	Elected in 1913. Lost re-election.	Mar 4, 1913 – Mar 3, 1919	Democratic	Willard Saulsbury Jr. (Wilmington)	22
18	Henry A. du Pont (Winterthur)	Republican	Jun 13, 1906 – Mar 3, 1917	Re-elected in 1911. Lost re-election.	22	64th	22	Elected in 1913. Lost re-election.	Mar 4, 1913 – Mar 3, 1919	Democratic	Willard Saulsbury Jr. (Wilmington)	22
19	Josiah O. Wolcott (Dover)	Democratic	Mar 4, 1917 – Jul 2, 1921	Elected in 1916. Resigned to become Chancellor of Delaware.	23	65th	22	Elected in 1913. Lost re-election.	Mar 4, 1913 – Mar 3, 1919	Democratic	Willard Saulsbury Jr. (Wilmington)	22
19	Josiah O. Wolcott (Dover)	Democratic	Mar 4, 1917 – Jul 2, 1921	Elected in 1916. Resigned to become Chancellor of Delaware.	23	66th	23	Elected in 1918. Lost renomination.	Mar 4, 1919 – Mar 3, 1925	Republican	L. Heisler Ball (Marshallton)	23
19	Josiah O. Wolcott (Dover)	Democratic	Mar 4, 1917 – Jul 2, 1921	Elected in 1916. Resigned to become Chancellor of Delaware.	23	67th	23	Elected in 1918. Lost renomination.	Mar 4, 1919 – Mar 3, 1925	Republican	L. Heisler Ball (Marshallton)	23
20	T. Coleman du Pont (Wilmington)	Republican	Jul 7, 1921 – Nov 6, 1922	Appointed to finish Wolcott's term. Lost election to finish Wolcott's term.	23	67th	23	Elected in 1918. Lost renomination.	Mar 4, 1919 – Mar 3, 1925	Republican	L. Heisler Ball (Marshallton)	23
21	Thomas F. Bayard Jr. (Wilmington)	Democratic	Nov 7, 1922 – Mar 3, 1929	Elected in 1922 to finish Wolcott's term.	23	67th	23	Elected in 1918. Lost renomination.	Mar 4, 1919 – Mar 3, 1925	Republican	L. Heisler Ball (Marshallton)	23
21	Thomas F. Bayard Jr. (Wilmington)	Democratic	Nov 7, 1922 – Mar 3, 1929	Elected in 1922. Lost re-election.	24	68th	23	Elected in 1918. Lost renomination.	Mar 4, 1919 – Mar 3, 1925	Republican	L. Heisler Ball (Marshallton)	23
21	Thomas F. Bayard Jr. (Wilmington)	Democratic	Nov 7, 1922 – Mar 3, 1929	Elected in 1922. Lost re-election.	24	69th	24	Elected in 1924. Resigned.	Mar 4, 1925 – Dec 8, 1928	Republican	T. Coleman du Pont (Wilmington)	24
21	Thomas F. Bayard Jr. (Wilmington)	Democratic	Nov 7, 1922 – Mar 3, 1929	Elected in 1922. Lost re-election.	24	70th	24	Elected in 1924. Resigned.	Mar 4, 1925 – Dec 8, 1928	Republican	T. Coleman du Pont (Wilmington)	24
21	Thomas F. Bayard Jr. (Wilmington)	Democratic	Nov 7, 1922 – Mar 3, 1929	Elected in 1922. Lost re-election.	24	70th	24		Dec 8, 1928 – Dec 10, 1928	Vacant		
21	Thomas F. Bayard Jr. (Wilmington)	Democratic	Nov 7, 1922 – Mar 3, 1929	Elected in 1922. Lost re-election.	24	70th	24	Appointed to finish du Pont's term. Elected in 1930 to finish du Pont's term.	Dec 10, 1928 – Jan 3, 1937	Republican	Daniel O. Hastings (Wilmington)	25
22	John G. Townsend Jr. (Selbyville)	Republican	Mar 4, 1929 – Jan 3, 1941	Elected in 1928.	25	71st	24	Appointed to finish du Pont's term. Elected in 1930 to finish du Pont's term.	Dec 10, 1928 – Jan 3, 1937	Republican	Daniel O. Hastings (Wilmington)	25
22	John G. Townsend Jr. (Selbyville)	Republican	Mar 4, 1929 – Jan 3, 1941	Elected in 1928.	25	72nd	25	Elected in 1930. Lost re-election.	Dec 10, 1928 – Jan 3, 1937	Republican	Daniel O. Hastings (Wilmington)	25
22	John G. Townsend Jr. (Selbyville)	Republican	Mar 4, 1929 – Jan 3, 1941	Elected in 1928.	25	73rd	25	Elected in 1930. Lost re-election.	Dec 10, 1928 – Jan 3, 1937	Republican	Daniel O. Hastings (Wilmington)	25
22	John G. Townsend Jr. (Selbyville)	Republican	Mar 4, 1929 – Jan 3, 1941	Re-elected in 1934. Lost re-election.	26	74th	25	Elected in 1930. Lost re-election.	Dec 10, 1928 – Jan 3, 1937	Republican	Daniel O. Hastings (Wilmington)	25
22	John G. Townsend Jr. (Selbyville)	Republican	Mar 4, 1929 – Jan 3, 1941	Re-elected in 1934. Lost re-election.	26	75th	26	Elected in 1936. Lost renomination.	Jan 3, 1937 – Jan 3, 1943	Democratic	James H. Hughes (Dover)	26
22	John G. Townsend Jr. (Selbyville)	Republican	Mar 4, 1929 – Jan 3, 1941	Re-elected in 1934. Lost re-election.	26	76th	26	Elected in 1936. Lost renomination.	Jan 3, 1937 – Jan 3, 1943	Democratic	James H. Hughes (Dover)	26
23	James M. Tunnell (Georgetown)	Democratic	Jan 3, 1941 – Jan 3, 1947	Elected in 1940. Lost re-election.	27	77th	26	Elected in 1936. Lost renomination.	Jan 3, 1937 – Jan 3, 1943	Democratic	James H. Hughes (Dover)	26
23	James M. Tunnell (Georgetown)	Democratic	Jan 3, 1941 – Jan 3, 1947	Elected in 1940. Lost re-election.	27	78th	27	Elected in 1942. Lost re-election.	Jan 3, 1943 – Jan 3, 1949	Republican	C. Douglass Buck (Wilmington)	27
23	James M. Tunnell (Georgetown)	Democratic	Jan 3, 1941 – Jan 3, 1947	Elected in 1940. Lost re-election.	27	79th	27	Elected in 1942. Lost re-election.	Jan 3, 1943 – Jan 3, 1949	Republican	C. Douglass Buck (Wilmington)	27
24	John J. Williams (Millsboro)	Republican	Jan 3, 1947 – Dec 31, 1970	Elected in 1946.	28	80th	27	Elected in 1942. Lost re-election.	Jan 3, 1943 – Jan 3, 1949	Republican	C. Douglass Buck (Wilmington)	27
24	John J. Williams (Millsboro)	Republican	Jan 3, 1947 – Dec 31, 1970	Elected in 1946.	28	81st	28	Elected in 1948.	Jan 3, 1949 – Jan 3, 1961	Democratic	J. Allen Frear Jr. (Dover)	28
24	John J. Williams (Millsboro)	Republican	Jan 3, 1947 – Dec 31, 1970	Elected in 1946.	28	82nd	28	Elected in 1948.	Jan 3, 1949 – Jan 3, 1961	Democratic	J. Allen Frear Jr. (Dover)	28
24	John J. Williams (Millsboro)	Republican	Jan 3, 1947 – Dec 31, 1970	Re-elected in 1952.	29	83rd	28	Elected in 1948.	Jan 3, 1949 – Jan 3, 1961	Democratic	J. Allen Frear Jr. (Dover)	28
24	John J. Williams (Millsboro)	Republican	Jan 3, 1947 – Dec 31, 1970	Re-elected in 1952.	29	84th	29	Re-elected in 1954. Lost re-election.	Jan 3, 1949 – Jan 3, 1961	Democratic	J. Allen Frear Jr. (Dover)	28
24	John J. Williams (Millsboro)	Republican	Jan 3, 1947 – Dec 31, 1970	Re-elected in 1952.	29	85th	29	Re-elected in 1954. Lost re-election.	Jan 3, 1949 – Jan 3, 1961	Democratic	J. Allen Frear Jr. (Dover)	28
24	John J. Williams (Millsboro)	Republican	Jan 3, 1947 – Dec 31, 1970	Re-elected in 1958.	30	86th	29	Re-elected in 1954. Lost re-election.	Jan 3, 1949 – Jan 3, 1961	Democratic	J. Allen Frear Jr. (Dover)	28
24	John J. Williams (Millsboro)	Republican	Jan 3, 1947 – Dec 31, 1970	Re-elected in 1958.	30	87th	30	Elected in 1960.	Jan 3, 1961 – Jan 3, 1973	Republican	J. Caleb Boggs (Wilmington)	29
24	John J. Williams (Millsboro)	Republican	Jan 3, 1947 – Dec 31, 1970	Re-elected in 1958.	30	88th	30	Elected in 1960.	Jan 3, 1961 – Jan 3, 1973	Republican	J. Caleb Boggs (Wilmington)	29
24	John J. Williams (Millsboro)	Republican	Jan 3, 1947 – Dec 31, 1970	Re-elected in 1964. Retired and resigned to give his successor preferential seniority.	31	89th	30	Elected in 1960.	Jan 3, 1961 – Jan 3, 1973	Republican	J. Caleb Boggs (Wilmington)	29
24	John J. Williams (Millsboro)	Republican	Jan 3, 1947 – Dec 31, 1970	Re-elected in 1964. Retired and resigned to give his successor preferential seniority.	31	90th	31	Re-elected in 1966. Lost re-election.	Jan 3, 1961 – Jan 3, 1973	Republican	J. Caleb Boggs (Wilmington)	29
24	John J. Williams (Millsboro)	Republican	Jan 3, 1947 – Dec 31, 1970	Re-elected in 1964. Retired and resigned to give his successor preferential seniority.	31	91st	31	Re-elected in 1966. Lost re-election.	Jan 3, 1961 – Jan 3, 1973	Republican	J. Caleb Boggs (Wilmington)	29
25	William Roth (Wilmington)	Republican	Jan 1, 1971 – Jan 3, 2001	Appointed to finish Williams's term, having been elected to the next term.	31	91st	31	Re-elected in 1966. Lost re-election.	Jan 3, 1961 – Jan 3, 1973	Republican	J. Caleb Boggs (Wilmington)	29
25	William Roth (Wilmington)	Republican	Jan 1, 1971 – Jan 3, 2001	Elected in 1970.	32	92nd	31	Re-elected in 1966. Lost re-election.	Jan 3, 1961 – Jan 3, 1973	Republican	J. Caleb Boggs (Wilmington)	29
25	William Roth (Wilmington)	Republican	Jan 1, 1971 – Jan 3, 2001	Elected in 1970.	32	93rd	32	Elected in 1972.	Jan 3, 1973 – Jan 15, 2009	Democratic	Joe Biden (Wilmington)	30
25	William Roth (Wilmington)	Republican	Jan 1, 1971 – Jan 3, 2001	Elected in 1970.	32	94th	32	Elected in 1972.	Jan 3, 1973 – Jan 15, 2009	Democratic	Joe Biden (Wilmington)	30
25	William Roth (Wilmington)	Republican	Jan 1, 1971 – Jan 3, 2001	Re-elected in 1976.	33	95th	32	Elected in 1972.	Jan 3, 1973 – Jan 15, 2009	Democratic	Joe Biden (Wilmington)	30
25	William Roth (Wilmington)	Republican	Jan 1, 1971 – Jan 3, 2001	Re-elected in 1976.	33	96th	33	Re-elected in 1978.	Jan 3, 1973 – Jan 15, 2009	Democratic	Joe Biden (Wilmington)	30
25	William Roth (Wilmington)	Republican	Jan 1, 1971 – Jan 3, 2001	Re-elected in 1976.	33	97th	33	Re-elected in 1978.	Jan 3, 1973 – Jan 15, 2009	Democratic	Joe Biden (Wilmington)	30
25	William Roth (Wilmington)	Republican	Jan 1, 1971 – Jan 3, 2001	Re-elected in 1982.	34	98th	33	Re-elected in 1978.	Jan 3, 1973 – Jan 15, 2009	Democratic	Joe Biden (Wilmington)	30
25	William Roth (Wilmington)	Republican	Jan 1, 1971 – Jan 3, 2001	Re-elected in 1982.	34	99th	34	Re-elected in 1984.	Jan 3, 1973 – Jan 15, 2009	Democratic	Joe Biden (Wilmington)	30
25	William Roth (Wilmington)	Republican	Jan 1, 1971 – Jan 3, 2001	Re-elected in 1982.	34	100th	34	Re-elected in 1984.	Jan 3, 1973 – Jan 15, 2009	Democratic	Joe Biden (Wilmington)	30
25	William Roth (Wilmington)	Republican	Jan 1, 1971 – Jan 3, 2001	Re-elected in 1988.	35	101st	34	Re-elected in 1984.	Jan 3, 1973 – Jan 15, 2009	Democratic	Joe Biden (Wilmington)	30
25	William Roth (Wilmington)	Republican	Jan 1, 1971 – Jan 3, 2001	Re-elected in 1988.	35	102nd	35	Re-elected in 1990.	Jan 3, 1973 – Jan 15, 2009	Democratic	Joe Biden (Wilmington)	30
25	William Roth (Wilmington)	Republican	Jan 1, 1971 – Jan 3, 2001	Re-elected in 1988.	35	103rd	35	Re-elected in 1990.	Jan 3, 1973 – Jan 15, 2009	Democratic	Joe Biden (Wilmington)	30
25	William Roth (Wilmington)	Republican	Jan 1, 1971 – Jan 3, 2001	Re-elected in 1994. Lost re-election.	36	104th	35	Re-elected in 1990.	Jan 3, 1973 – Jan 15, 2009	Democratic	Joe Biden (Wilmington)	30
25	William Roth (Wilmington)	Republican	Jan 1, 1971 – Jan 3, 2001	Re-elected in 1994. Lost re-election.	36	105th	36	Re-elected in 1996.	Jan 3, 1973 – Jan 15, 2009	Democratic	Joe Biden (Wilmington)	30
25	William Roth (Wilmington)	Republican	Jan 1, 1971 – Jan 3, 2001	Re-elected in 1994. Lost re-election.	36	106th	36	Re-elected in 1996.	Jan 3, 1973 – Jan 15, 2009	Democratic	Joe Biden (Wilmington)	30
26	Tom Carper (Wilmington)	Democratic	Jan 3, 2001 – Jan 3, 2025	Elected in 2000.	37	107th	36	Re-elected in 1996.	Jan 3, 1973 – Jan 15, 2009	Democratic	Joe Biden (Wilmington)	30
26	Tom Carper (Wilmington)	Democratic	Jan 3, 2001 – Jan 3, 2025	Elected in 2000.	37	108th	37	Re-elected in 2002.	Jan 3, 1973 – Jan 15, 2009	Democratic	Joe Biden (Wilmington)	30
26	Tom Carper (Wilmington)	Democratic	Jan 3, 2001 – Jan 3, 2025	Elected in 2000.	37	109th	37	Re-elected in 2002.	Jan 3, 1973 – Jan 15, 2009	Democratic	Joe Biden (Wilmington)	30
26	Tom Carper (Wilmington)	Democratic	Jan 3, 2001 – Jan 3, 2025	Re-elected in 2006.	38	110th	37	Re-elected in 2002.	Jan 3, 1973 – Jan 15, 2009	Democratic	Joe Biden (Wilmington)	30
26	Tom Carper (Wilmington)	Democratic	Jan 3, 2001 – Jan 3, 2025	Re-elected in 2006.	38	111th	38	Re-elected in 2008. Resigned to become U.S. Vice President.	Jan 3, 1973 – Jan 15, 2009	Democratic	Joe Biden (Wilmington)	30
26	Tom Carper (Wilmington)	Democratic	Jan 3, 2001 – Jan 3, 2025	Re-elected in 2006.	38	111th	38	Appointed to continue Biden's term. Retired when his successor was elected.	Jan 15, 2009 – Nov 15, 2010	Democratic	Ted Kaufman (Wilmington)	31
26	Tom Carper (Wilmington)	Democratic	Jan 3, 2001 – Jan 3, 2025	Re-elected in 2006.	38	111th	38	Elected in 2010 to finish Biden's term.	Nov 15, 2010 – present	Democratic	Chris Coons (Wilmington)	32
26	Tom Carper (Wilmington)	Democratic	Jan 3, 2001 – Jan 3, 2025	Re-elected in 2006.	38	112th	38	Elected in 2010 to finish Biden's term.	Nov 15, 2010 – present	Democratic	Chris Coons (Wilmington)	32
26	Tom Carper (Wilmington)	Democratic	Jan 3, 2001 – Jan 3, 2025	Re-elected in 2012.	39	113th	38	Elected in 2010 to finish Biden's term.	Nov 15, 2010 – present	Democratic	Chris Coons (Wilmington)	32
26	Tom Carper (Wilmington)	Democratic	Jan 3, 2001 – Jan 3, 2025	Re-elected in 2012.	39	114th	39	Re-elected in 2014.	Nov 15, 2010 – present	Democratic	Chris Coons (Wilmington)	32
26	Tom Carper (Wilmington)	Democratic	Jan 3, 2001 – Jan 3, 2025	Re-elected in 2012.	39	115th	39	Re-elected in 2014.	Nov 15, 2010 – present	Democratic	Chris Coons (Wilmington)	32
26	Tom Carper (Wilmington)	Democratic	Jan 3, 2001 – Jan 3, 2025	Re-elected in 2018. Retired.	40	116th	39	Re-elected in 2014.	Nov 15, 2010 – present	Democratic	Chris Coons (Wilmington)	32
26	Tom Carper (Wilmington)	Democratic	Jan 3, 2001 – Jan 3, 2025	Re-elected in 2018. Retired.	40	117th	40	Re-elected in 2020.	Nov 15, 2010 – present	Democratic	Chris Coons (Wilmington)	32
26	Tom Carper (Wilmington)	Democratic	Jan 3, 2001 – Jan 3, 2025	Re-elected in 2018. Retired.	40	118th	40	Re-elected in 2020.	Nov 15, 2010 – present	Democratic	Chris Coons (Wilmington)	32
27	Lisa Blunt Rochester (Wilmington)	Democratic	Jan 3, 2025 – present	Elected in 2024.	41	119th	40	Re-elected in 2020.	Nov 15, 2010 – present	Democratic	Chris Coons (Wilmington)	32
27	Lisa Blunt Rochester (Wilmington)	Democratic	Jan 3, 2025 – present	Elected in 2024.	41	120th	41	Re-elected in 2026.	Nov 15, 2010 – present	Democratic	Chris Coons (Wilmington)	32
27	Lisa Blunt Rochester (Wilmington)	Democratic	Jan 3, 2025 – present	Elected in 2024.	41	121st	41	Re-elected in 2026.	Nov 15, 2010 – present	Democratic	Chris Coons (Wilmington)	32
To be determined in the 2030 election.					42	122nd	41	Re-elected in 2026.	Nov 15, 2010 – present	Democratic	Chris Coons (Wilmington)	32
To be determined in the 2030 election.					42	123rd	42	To be determined in the 2032 election.				

== See also ==
- Delaware's congressional delegations
- List of United States representatives from Delaware
- List of United States Senate elections in Delaware
