= George Gray (Delaware politician) =

American politician and judge (1840–1925)

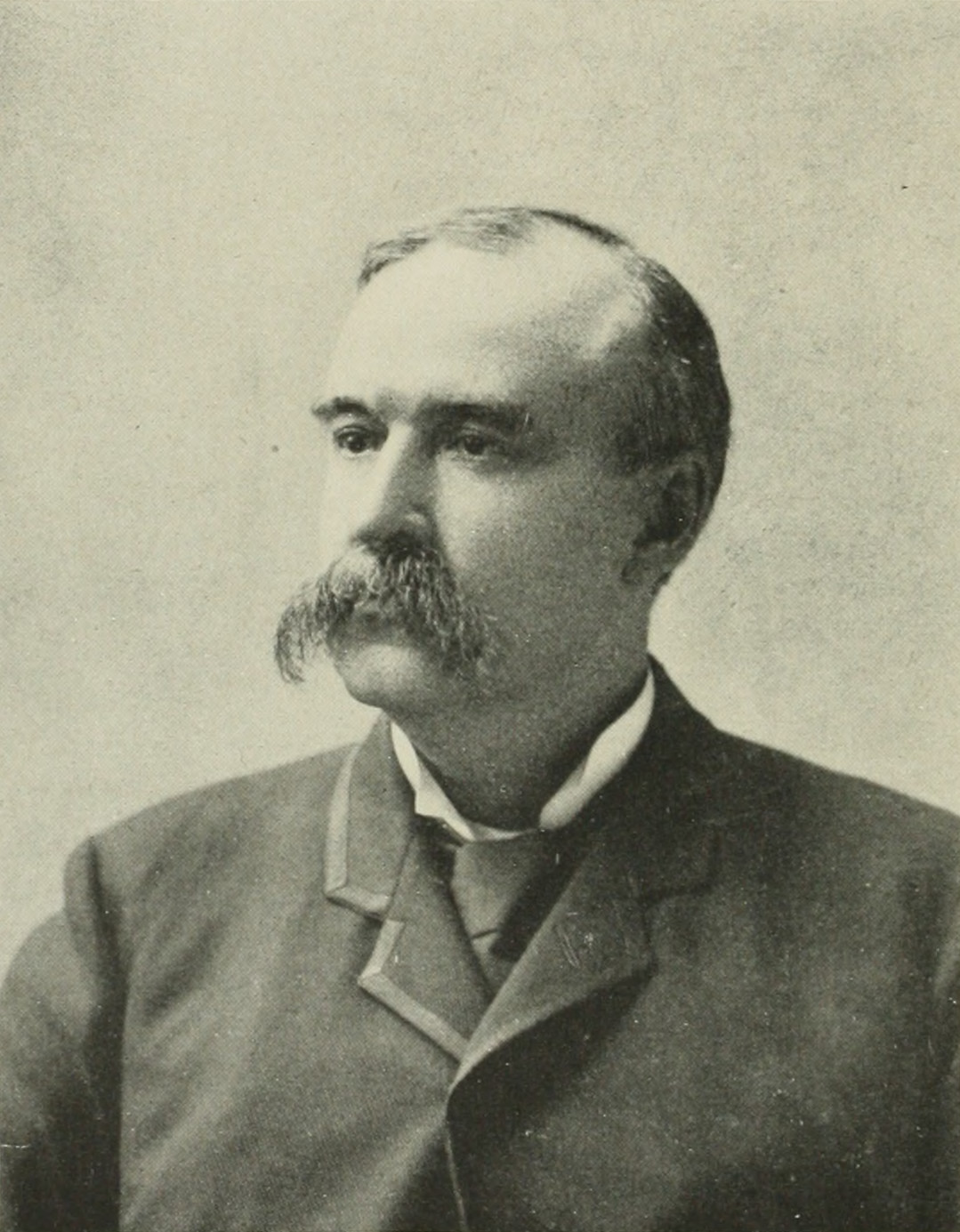
- Gray c. 1899

Judge of the United States Court of Appeals for the Third Circuit
- In office March 29, 1899 – June 1, 1914
- Appointed by: William McKinley
- Preceded by: Seat established by 30 Stat. 846
- Succeeded by: Victor Baynard Woolley

Judge of the United States Circuit Courts for the Third Circuit
- In office March 29, 1899 – December 31, 1911
- Appointed by: William McKinley
- Preceded by: Seat established by 30 Stat. 846
- Succeeded by: Seat abolished

United States Senator from Delaware
- In office March 18, 1885 – March 3, 1899
- Preceded by: Thomas F. Bayard
- Succeeded by: L. Heisler Ball

Attorney General of Delaware
- In office 1879–1885
- Governor: John W. Hall; Charles C. Stockley
- Preceded by: John B. Penington
- Succeeded by: John Henry Paynter

Personal details
- Born: George Gray; May 4, 1840 New Castle, Delaware, U.S.
- Died: August 7, 1925 (aged 85) Wilmington, Delaware, U.S.
- Resting place: Presbyterian Cemetery; New Castle, Delaware
- Party: Democratic
- Relatives: Andrew C. Gray (father); Hamilton S. Hawkins (brother-in-law); Hamilton S. Hawkins III (nephew)
- Education: Princeton University (AB, AM); Harvard Law School read law

George Gray (May 4, 1840 – August 7, 1925) was a United States senator from Delaware and a United States circuit judge of the United States Court of Appeals for the Third Circuit and the United States Circuit Courts for the Third Circuit.

== Education and career ==
Gray was born on May 4, 1840, in New Castle, New Castle County, Delaware, the son of Andrew C. Gray (1804–1885), a lawyer, banker, businessman, and public official in the U.S. state of Delaware. The younger Gray attended the common schools, received an Artium Baccalaureus degree in 1859 from the College of New Jersey (now Princeton University), an Artium Magister degree in 1863 from the same institution, attended Harvard Law School, then read law with his father and was admitted to the bar in 1863. He entered private practice in New Castle from 1863 to 1879. He was the Attorney General of Delaware from 1879 to 1885.

Gray was a member of the Permanent Court of Arbitration at The Hague from 1900 to 1925.

== Congressional service ==
Gray was elected as a Democrat to the United States Senate to fill the vacancy caused by the resignation of United States Senator Thomas F. Bayard. He was reelected in 1887 and 1893 and served from March 18, 1885, to March 3, 1899. He was an unsuccessful candidate for reelection in 1899. He was Chairman of the Committee on Patents for the 53rd United States Congress; Chairman of the Committee on Privileges and Elections for the 53rd United States Congress; and Chairman of the Committee on Revolutionary Claims for the 55th United States Congress.

== Federal judicial service ==
On March 29, 1899, Gray received a recess appointment from President William McKinley to the United States Court of Appeals for the Third Circuit and the United States Circuit Courts for the Third Circuit, to a new joint seat authorized by 30 Stat. 846. He was nominated to the same position by McKinley on December 11, 1899. He was confirmed by the United States Senate on December 18, 1899, and received his commission the same day. On December 31, 1911, the Circuit Courts were abolished and he thereafter served only on the Court of Appeals. His service ended when he retired on June 1, 1914.

== Presidential consideration ==
Gray was proposed as a nominee for the presidency at the 1904 and 1908 Democratic conventions. In 1904, he received only 12 votes, and in 1908 he received 50.5 votes, finishing second behind William Jennings Bryan.

== Other service ==
Gray was a member of the Joint High Commission which met in Quebec, Canada, in August 1898 to settle differences between the United States and Canada. He was a member of the commission to arrange the terms of the Treaty of Paris between the United States and Spain in 1898. He was Chairman of the commission to investigate conditions of the coal strike in Pennsylvania in 1902. He was appointed by President McKinley to the Permanent Court of Arbitration at The Hague, Netherlands, in 1900. He was reappointed in 1906 by President Theodore Roosevelt, in 1912 by President William Howard Taft and in 1920 by President Woodrow Wilson. He was a member of several commissions established to arbitrate various international disputes. He was a member of the Board of Regents of the Smithsonian Institution from 1890 to 1925. He was Vice President and trustee of the Carnegie Endowment for International Peace.

== Death ==
Gray died on August 7, 1925, in Wilmington, Delaware. He was interred in Presbyterian Cemetery in New Castle.

== Sources ==
- United States Congress. "George Gray (id: G000396)". Biographical Directory of the United States Congress.
- Delaware's Members of Congress
- The Political Graveyard

U.S. Senate
Preceded by Thomas F. Bayard	U.S. senator from Delaware; 1885–1899	Succeeded by L. Heisler Ball
Legal offices
Preceded by John B. Penington	Attorney General of Delaware; 1879–1885	Succeeded by John Henry Paynter
Preceded by Seat established by 30 Stat. 846	Judge of the United States Circuit Courts for the Third Circuit; 1899–1911	Seat abolished
Preceded by Seat established by 30 Stat. 846	Judge of the United States Court of Appeals for the Third Circuit; 1899–1914	Succeeded by Victor Baynard Woolley
