= Proportional Representation League =

The Proportional Representation League was an organization founded in 1893 in the campaign for the adoption of the Proportional representation system of voting at the city, state and federal level in the U.S. and Canada. (There was a separate Proportional Representation Society in the United Kingdom as well.) Many Canadians as well as Americans were active in the League.

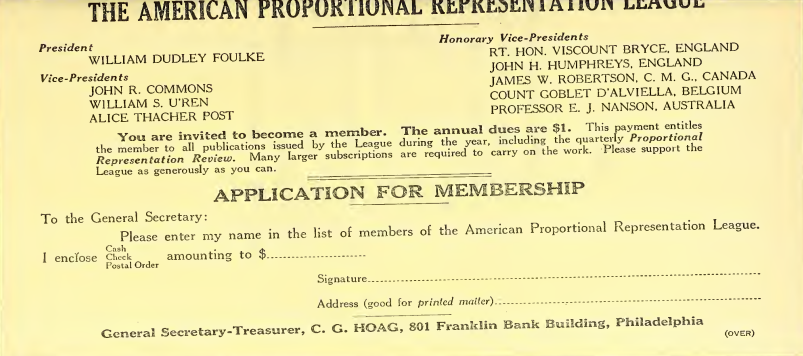
American PR League membership application from 1919

The League merged with the National Municipal League in 1932, and its newsletter, The Proportional Representation Review, apparently ceased publication.The NML published the National Municipal Review, which publicized proportional representation.

The Proportional Representation League was founded at the Memorial Art Institute of Chicago at the World's Columbian Exposition on August 10–12, 1893, to promote the cause of proportional representation within the United States and Canada.

Prominent members at the beginning included League Secretary Stoughton Cooley, Rhode Island Governor Lucius F. C. Garvin, federal judge Albert Branson Maris, and economist and labor reformer John R. Commons.

Robert Tyson of Toronto became secretary of the League in 1904 and held that post until 1912. Catherine Helen Spence had helped convert him to the PR cause in 1893. Australian Catherine Helen Spence was a pioneer of effective voting (which was her term for PR), and president of the Effective Voting League of South Australia, when she visited Canada and the U.S.

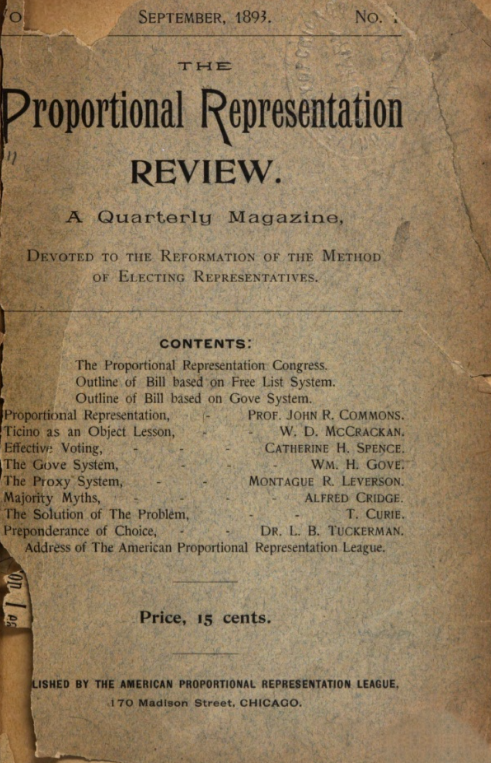
Proportional Representation Review, a quarterly magazine issued by the PR League beginning in 1893

The League's activities included distributing information to inquirers on the reform and publishing pamphlets, books and The Proportional Representation Review. Ten quarterly issues of the Review were published 1893-1896. The issues included articles by pro-rep luminaries of the time, including Alfred Cridge (husband of suffragette and socialist author Annie Cridge), Massachusetts Representative Wm H. Gove, Professor Ernest Naville and Sir John Lubbock. Due to lack of funds, the League suspended its publication. The League continued to publish annual reports of P.R. events and concerns.

The Review was later again in publication, from 1901 to about 1932, as a section of The Direct Legislation Record And The Proportional Representation Review: A Non-partisan Advocate Of Pure Democracy.

Robert Tyson, a resident of Toronto (Canada), was the editor of the PR Review from 1901 to 1913. In 1903 he conducted the election of the executive of the Trades and Labour Congress using Hare-Spence PR (Single transferable voting). Tyson authored two pamphlets that were published by the PR League -- Proportional Representation including its relationship to the Initiative and Referendum (1904) and Proportional Representation - its Principles, Practice and Progress, with description of the Swiss Free List, the Hare Spence Plan and the Gove System.

In 1913 Tyson republished the "Original constitution of the American Proportional Representation League as printed in a pamphlet published by the League October 29th, 1893," and appended a "Proposed constitution of the American Proportional Representation League".

Clarence Gilbert Hoag became editor of the PR Review in 1914. (Tyson had spent his old age in PR work and died in 1917.) Hoag had authored the pamphlet The Representative Council Plan of City Government, published by the PR League in 1913. Hoag also was co-author (with George Hervey Hallett) of the 1926 book Proportional Representation.

== Statement of League's beliefs ==
Here is a statement of the beliefs of the PR League.

"WHAT WE ADVOCATE" "The P. R. League urges the Hare system of proportional representation ("P. R.") for the election of representative bodies. This system of election gives every group of like-minded voters the share of the members elected that it has of the votes cast. It does this by giving every voter a single vote, either at large [such as in a city-wide district in election of a city council] or in a district electing several members, and requiring a separate quota of votes for the election of each member.It allows the voter to make his vote count without knowing whether his favorite can secure the necessary quota or not. All he has to do is to mark not only his first choice but as many alternative choices as he likes. If it is found that his ballot cannot possibly help elect his first choice, it is used instead for the first of his later choices whom it can help. For a detailed description of the system, see the P. R. League's Leaflet No. 5."
