= Josiah O. Wolcott =

American politician (1877–1938)

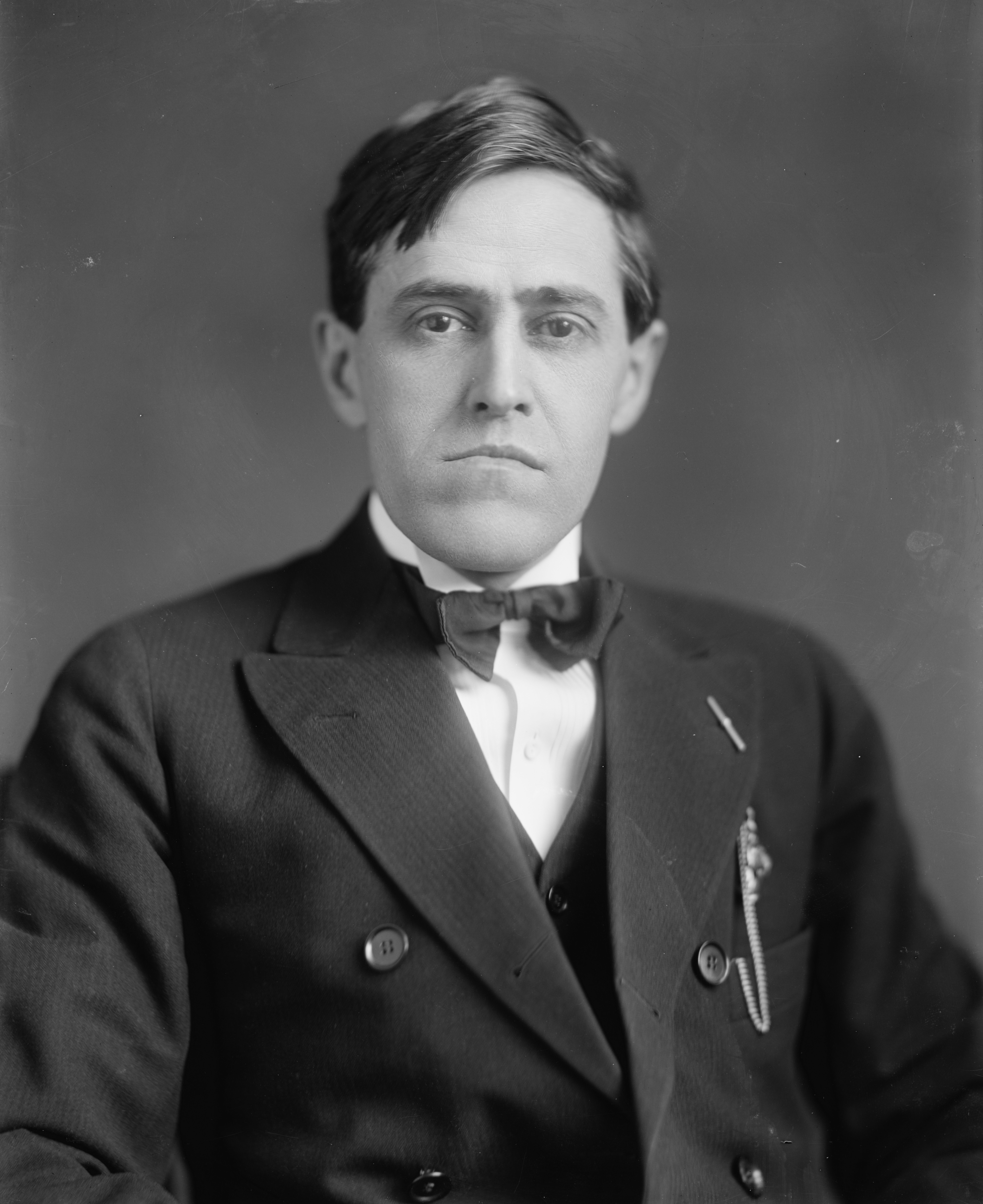

Chancellor of the Delaware Court of Chancery
- In office July 2, 1921 – November 11, 1938
- Preceded by: Charles M. Curtis
- Succeeded by: W. W. Harrington

United States Senator from Delaware
- In office March 4, 1917 – July 2, 1921
- Preceded by: Henry A. du Pont
- Succeeded by: T. Coleman du Pont

Attorney General of Delaware
- In office January 1913 – January 1917
- Governor: Charles R. Miller
- Preceded by: Andrew C. Gray
- Succeeded by: David J. Reinhardt

Personal details
- Born: Josiah Oliver Wolcott; October 31, 1877 Dover, Delaware, U.S.
- Died: November 11, 1938 (aged 61) Dover, Delaware, U.S.
- Party: Democratic
- Education: Wesleyan University (PhB)

Josiah Oliver Wolcott (October 31, 1877 – November 11, 1938) was an American lawyer, politician and judge, from Dover, in Kent County, Delaware. He was a member of the Democratic Party, who served as Attorney General of Delaware, U.S. senator from Delaware, and Chancellor of Delaware.

== Early life and family ==
Wolcott was born in Dover, Delaware, attended the Wilmington Conference Academy, now Wesley College, at Dover, and graduated from Wesleyan University in Middletown, Connecticut. He was admitted to the Delaware Bar in 1904 and began the practice of law at Wilmington, Delaware.

== Professional and political career ==
Wolcott was Deputy Delaware Attorney General from 1909 until 1913, elected Delaware Attorney General in 1912 and served from January 21, 1913, until January 16, 1917.

In the first popular election of a U.S. senator in Delaware, he was elected to the U.S. Senate in 1916, defeating incumbent Republican U.S. senator Henry A. du Pont. During this term, Wolcott served with the Democratic majority in the 65th Congress, but was in the minority in the 66th and 67th Congress. In the 65th Congress he was Chairman of the Committee on Expenditures in the Department of Commerce. Between 1918 and 1919, he served on the Overman Committee, investigating seditious German and Bolshevik activities. In all, he served from March 4, 1917, to July 2, 1921, during the administrations of U.S. presidents Woodrow Wilson and Warren G. Harding.

Wolcott was the senate sponsor of legislation to create a federal charter for the American Legion. The House co-sponsor was Rep. Royal Johnson of South Dakota. The bill was filed on June 27, 1919, passed the House on August 27, passed the Senate on September 5 and was signed by President Wilson on September 16, 1919.

On July 2, 1921, Wolcott resigned from the U.S. Senate to accept a surprising appointment from Republican Governor William D. Denney to become Chancellor of the Delaware Court of Chancery. The appointment came to be known as the "deal" or the "dirty deal", and many suspected T. Coleman du Pont organized it in order to gain the U.S. Senate seat for himself and the Republican Party. Wolcott served as Chancellor for the remainder of his life.

== Death and legacy ==
Wolcott died at Dover and is buried there in the Lakeside Methodist Episcopal Cemetery.

According to Henry R. Horsey and William Duffy in their article on the Delaware Court system, Wolcott distinguished himself as Chancellor and they continued: Chancellery "Judge Pearson later recalled the spartan 'office' of Chancellor Wolcott, consisting of a small desk and gooseneck lamp, in the stacks of the State Law Library in Dover. There Wolcott worked without a secretary, writing his opinions in longhand. Pearson attributed Wolcott's conduct to his determination to ask for nothing. It was during Wolcott's tenure that Delaware's Court of Chancery gained the high regard and respect of lawyers and corporate boards throughout the country. It was Wolcott's judicial wisdom and judgment that first attracted lawyers and litigants from around the nation to Delaware as a preferred forum for litigation."

Every year, five students in their final year at Delaware Law School earn the Josiah Oliver Wolcott Fellowship. Wolcott fellows work as judicial law clerks for the Supreme Court of Delaware.

== Almanac ==
Elections are held the first Tuesday after November 1. U.S. senators are popularly elected and took office March 4 for a six-year term.

Public offices
Office	Type	Location	Began office	Ended office	Notes
Attorney General	Executive	Dover	January 21, 1913	January 16, 1917	Delaware
U.S. Senator	Legislative	Washington	March 4, 1917	July 2, 1921	resigned
Chancellor	Judiciary	Dover	July 2, 1921	November 11, 1938	State Chancery Court

United States Congressional service
Dates	Congress	Chamber	Majority	President	Committees	Class/District
1917–1919	65th	U.S. Senate	Democratic	Woodrow Wilson		class 1
1919–1921	66th	U.S. Senate	Republican	Woodrow Wilson		class 1
1921–1923	67th	U.S. Senate	Republican	Warren G. Harding		class 1

Election results
Year	Office	Subject	Party	Votes	%	Opponent	Party	Votes	%
1916	U.S. senator	Josiah O. Wolcott	Democratic	25,434	50%	Henry A. du Pont; Hiram R. Burton	Republican; Independent	22,925; 2,361	46% 5%

== Images ==
- Biographical Directory of the United States Congress

Party political offices
First	Democratic Party nominee for United States Senator (class 1) from Delaware; 1916	Succeeded by Thomas F. Bayard Jr.
Legal offices
Preceded by Andrew C. Gray	Attorney General of Delaware; 1913–1917	Succeeded by David J. Reinhardt
U.S. Senate
Preceded by Henry A. du Pont	U.S. Senator (Class 1) from Delaware; 1917-1921; Served alongside: Willard Saulsbury Jr., L. Heisler Ball	Succeeded by T. Coleman du Pont
