= Albert Branson Maris =

American judge (1893–1989)

Albert Maris

Senior Judge of the United States Court of Appeals for the Third Circuit
- In office December 31, 1958 – February 7, 1989

Judge of the United States Court of Appeals for the Third Circuit
- In office June 24, 1938 – December 31, 1958
- Appointed by: Franklin D. Roosevelt
- Preceded by: Victor Baynard Woolley
- Succeeded by: Phillip Forman

Judge of the United States District Court for the Eastern District of Pennsylvania
- In office June 22, 1936 – June 27, 1938
- Appointed by: Franklin D. Roosevelt
- Preceded by: Seat established
- Succeeded by: Harry Ellis Kalodner

Personal details
- Born: Albert Branson Maris; December 19, 1893 Philadelphia, Pennsylvania, U.S.
- Died: February 7, 1989 (aged 95) Lansdale, Pennsylvania, U.S.
- Education: Temple University (LLB); Drexel University

Albert Branson Maris (December 19, 1893 – February 7, 1989) was a United States circuit judge of the United States Court of Appeals for the Third Circuit and previously was a United States district judge of the United States District Court for the Eastern District of Pennsylvania.

== Education and career ==
Born in Philadelphia, Pennsylvania, Maris received a Bachelor of Laws from the Temple University Beasley School of Law in 1918 and was a private in the United States Army in that year. He was an assistant secretary of the Proportional Representation League in Philadelphia from 1918 to 1919, and was a legal staff member of the Bureau of Municipal Research in Philadelphia in 1919. He was in private practice in Philadelphia from 1919 to 1936, working as an editor of The Legal Intelligencer from 1935 to 1936. He also graduated from the Drexel Institute Engineering School in 1926.

== Federal judicial service ==
Maris was nominated by President Franklin D. Roosevelt on June 18, 1936, to the United States District Court for the Eastern District of Pennsylvania, to a new seat authorized by 49 Stat. 1523. He was confirmed by the United States Senate on June 20, 1936, and received his commission on June 22, 1936. His service terminated on June 27, 1938, following his confirmation to the Third Circuit.

Maris was nominated by President Roosevelt on June 14, 1938, to a seat on the United States Court of Appeals for the Third Circuit vacated by Judge Victor Baynard Woolley. He was confirmed by the Senate on June 16, 1938, and received his commission on June 24, 1938. He served as a Judge of the Emergency Court of Appeals from 1942 to 1962, serving as Chief Judge from 1943 to 1962. He assumed senior status on December 31, 1958. His service terminated on February 7, 1989, due to his death.

Maris was the trial judge in the Gobitis case.

=== Other service ===
Maris served as an adjunct professor of law at the Temple University Beasley School of Law from 1941 to 1955.

== See also ==
- List of United States federal judges by longevity of service

== Sources ==
Legal offices
New seat	Judge of the United States District Court for the Eastern District of Pennsylvania; 1936–1938	Succeeded by Harry Ellis Kalodner
Preceded by Victor Baynard Woolley	Judge of the United States Court of Appeals for the Third Circuit; 1938–1958	Succeeded by Phillip Forman
Preceded by Fred M. Vinson	Chief Judge of the Emergency Court of Appeals; 1943–1962	Position abolished
