= L. Heisler Ball =

American politician (1861–1933)

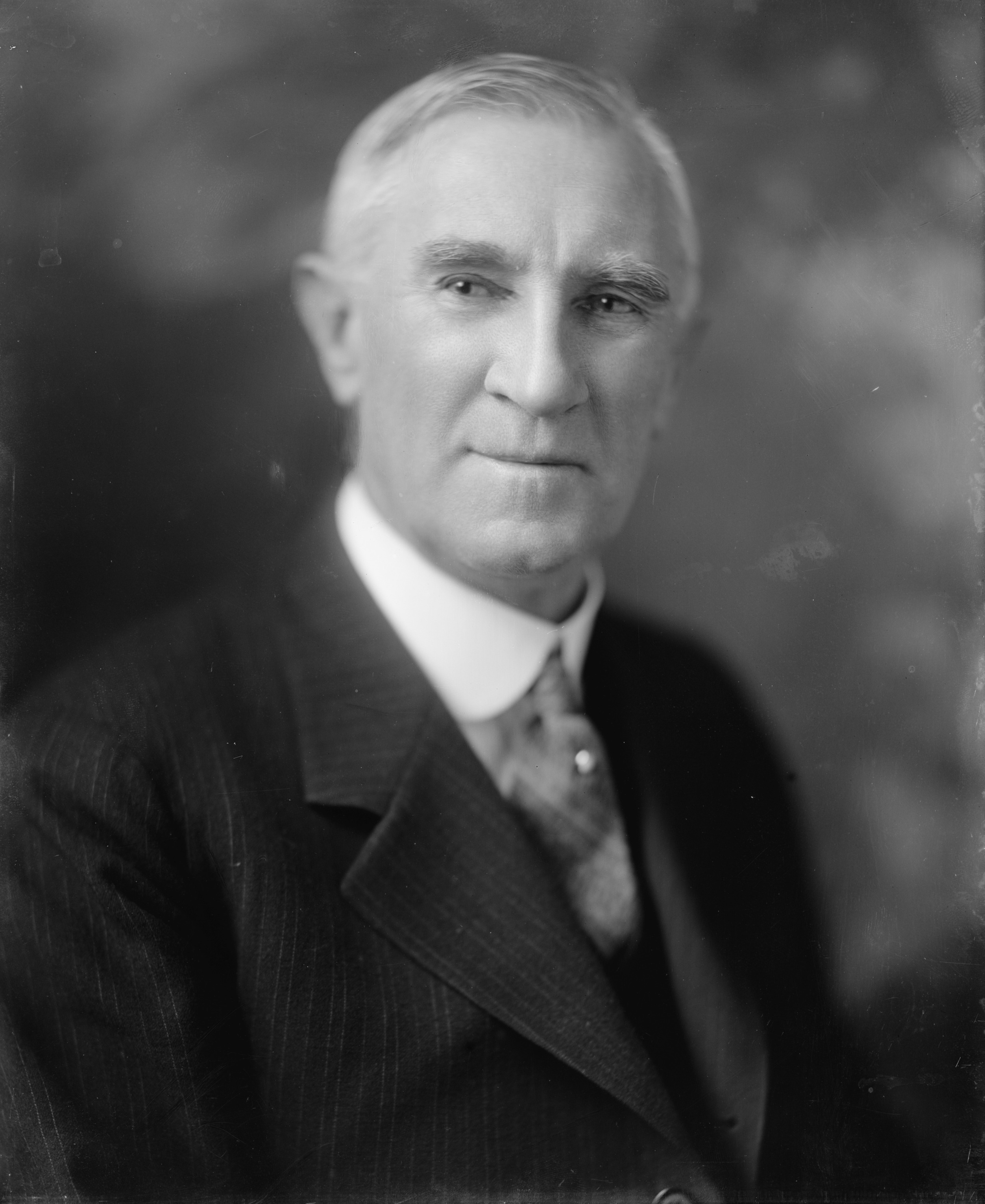

United States Senator from Delaware
- In office March 4, 1919 – March 3, 1925
- Preceded by: Willard Saulsbury Jr.
- Succeeded by: T. Coleman du Pont
- In office March 2, 1903 – March 3, 1905
- Preceded by: George Gray
- Succeeded by: Henry A. du Pont

Member of the U.S. House of Representatives from Delaware's at-large district
- In office March 4, 1901 – March 3, 1903
- Preceded by: Walter O. Hoffecker
- Succeeded by: Henry A. Houston

Personal details
- Born: September 21, 1861 New Castle County, Delaware, U.S.
- Died: October 18, 1933 (aged 72) New Castle County, Delaware, U.S.
- Party: Republican
- Education: Delaware College; University of Pennsylvania
- Profession: Physician

Lewis Heisler Ball (September 21, 1861 – October 18, 1933) was an American physician and politician from Mill Creek Hundred, New Castle County, Delaware. He was a member of the Republican Party and served as U.S. Representative from Delaware and two terms as U.S. Senator from Delaware. He was known by his middle name.

== Early life and family ==
Ball was born in Mill Creek Hundred, New Castle County, Delaware, the son of John Ball and Sarah (Baldwin) Ball. He attended the Rugby Academy at Wilmington, Delaware, and graduated from the Delaware College at Newark, Delaware in 1882. He received his medical degree from the University of Pennsylvania School of Medicine in Philadelphia in 1885 and began the practice of medicine at Brandywine Springs, near Wilmington in 1887. He married Katherine Springer Justis on November 14, 1893.

== The Addicks era ==
At the turn of the twentieth century, Delaware was going through a political transformation. Most obvious to the public was the bitter division in the Republican Party caused, in part, by the ambitions of J. Edward Addicks for a seat in the U.S. Senate. A gas company industrialist, he spent vast amounts of his own fortune to build a Republican Party, with that purpose in mind. Largely successful in heavily Democratic Kent County and Sussex County, he financed the organization of a faction that came to be known as "Union Republicans". Meanwhile, he was making bitter enemies of the New Castle County "Regular Republicans", many of whom considered him nothing more than a carpetbagger from Philadelphia.

Ball was a "Regular Republican", and an outspoken opponent of Addicks. As such he was elected State Treasurer of Delaware in 1898. He was then elected to the U.S. House of Representatives in 1900, and served with the Republican majority in the 57th Congress from March 4, 1901, until March 3, 1903, during the administrations of U.S. Presidents William McKinley and Theodore Roosevelt.

In 1899 one of the U.S. Senate seats for Delaware became vacant and the Union Republicans in the Delaware General Assembly attempted to elect Addicks. Although they did not have enough votes to do so, the Union Republicans were able to block the election of any other candidate. Because of this deadlock, the seat remained vacant for four years. When the other Senate seat came open in 1901, it too was left vacant due to the deadlock. Finally, in 1903, the matter became national news and too much of an embarrassment. Addicks relented and allowed Ball to be elected to the remaining two years left in the first seat and Addicks' lieutenant, J. Frank Allee, was elected to the second seat.

== United States Senator ==
Ball was elected to the U.S. Senate on March 2, 1903, and served the remaining two years of the term with the Republican majority in the 58th Congress. In 1905, when Ball's term ended, the General Assembly again deadlocked and took another two years to fill the seat. The repeated inability of the Delaware General Assembly to fulfill this constitutional duty contributed strong evidence throughout the nation of the need for the Seventeenth Amendment providing for the popular election of U.S. Senators.

In 1918, Ball was elected to the U.S. Senate in the second popular election of a U.S. Senator in Delaware, defeating incumbent Democratic U.S. Senator Willard Saulsbury Jr. During this term, Ball served with the Republican majority in the 66th, 67th and 68th U.S. Congress. In the 66th Congress, he was chairman of the Committee on Enrolled Bills and in the 67th and 68th Congress, he was a member of the Committee on the District of Columbia. He was also appointed as a member of the rent commission of Washington. Ball's actions with the rent commission angered some people. In August 1921, a shot was fired at Ball as he drove in an automobile, although he was not injured. The senator had received a threatening letter the day of the assault.

In June 1919 he cast his vote in favor of the Nineteenth Amendment providing for Women's suffrage.

Ball was never considered an especially effective U.S. Senator in terms of gaining patronage for Delaware. He became a rival of T. Coleman du Pont, the former President of E. I. du Pont de Nemours and Company and the effective leader of the Republican Party in Delaware. Du Pont had hoped to be the Republican candidate for U.S. President in 1920, but his efforts began to collapse when Ball deserted him after the first ballot at the 1920 Republican National Convention. Then, in 1922, Ball failed to support du Pont as he sought a full term in the U.S. Senate himself. By 1924 du Pont thought he had a score to settle and defeated Ball for their party’s nomination for a full term in 1924.

== Death and legacy ==
Ball died on the morning of October 18, 1933, at his home in Faulkland, Delaware, due to pneumonia. He is buried in the St. James Episcopal Church Cemetery near Stanton, Delaware.

Public offices
Office	Type	Location	Began office	Ended office	Notes
State Treasurer	Executive	Dover	January 17, 1899	January 15, 1901	
U.S. Representative	Legislature	Washington	March 4, 1901	March 3, 1903	
U.S. Senator	Legislature	Washington	March 2, 1903	March 3, 1905	
U.S. Senator	Legislative	Washington	March 4, 1919	March 3, 1925	

United States Congressional service
Dates	Congress	Chamber	Majority	President	Committees	Class/District
1901–1903	57th	U.S. House	Republican	William McKinley; Theodore Roosevelt		at-large
1903–1905	58th	U.S. Senate	Republican	Theodore Roosevelt		class 1
1919–1921	66th	U.S. Senate	Republican	Woodrow Wilson		class 2
1921–1923	67th	U.S. Senate	Republican	Warren G. Harding; Calvin Coolidge		class 2
1923–1925	68th	U.S. Senate	Republican	Calvin Coolidge		class 2

Election results
Year	Office	Subject	Party	Votes	%	Opponent	Party	Votes	%
1898	State Treasurer	L. Heisler Ball	Republican				Democratic		
1900	U.S. Representative	L. Heisler Ball	Republican	22,353	53%	Alexander M. Daly	Democratic	19,157	46%
1918	U.S. Senator	L. Heisler Ball	Republican	21,519	51%	Willard Saulsbury Jr.	Democratic	20,113	48%

== Images ==
- Biographical Directory of the United States Congress; photograph courtesy of the Library of Congress.

Party political offices
First	Republican nominee for U.S. Senator from Delaware (Class 2); 1918	Succeeded by T. Coleman du Pont
U.S. House of Representatives
Preceded by Walter O. Hoffecker	Member of the U.S. House of Representatives from Delaware's at-large congressional district 1901–1903	Succeeded by Henry A. Houston
U.S. Senate
Preceded by George Gray	U.S. Senator (Class 1) from Delaware; 1903–1905; Served alongside: J. Frank Allee	Succeeded by Henry A. du Pont
Preceded by Willard Saulsbury Jr.	U.S. Senator (Class 2) from Delaware; 1919–1925; Served alongside: Josiah O. Wolcott, T. Coleman du Pont, Thomas F. Bayard Jr.	Succeeded by T. Coleman du Pont
