= Andrew C. Gray =

American lawyer

Andrew C. Gray (1804–1885) was a lawyer, banker, businessman, and public official in the U.S. state of Delaware.

Gray was born in Kent County, Delaware, and graduated from the College of New Jersey, now Princeton University, in 1821.

He became a lawyer, opened his own law practice, and later became an entrepreneur. He had an interest in the New Castle Manufacturing Company, which built a foundry to help manufacture locomotives for the New Castle and Frenchtown Turnpike and Railroad Company. He later became president of the railroad, counting among his partners Charles I. du Pont. Some of the right-of-way pioneered by the railroad is still in use by Norfolk Southern.

In 1849, he became president of the New Castle branch of the Farmers' Bank of Delaware.

In 1853, he became president of the Chesapeake & Delaware Canal Company.

Gray was a Whig delegate from New Castle County to the 1853 convention that sought and failed to enact a fourth constitution for the state of Delaware.

He bought a house built for Gunning Bedford Jr., a delegate to the U.S. Constitutional Convention of 1787. In this house was subsequently born a son, George Gray (1840–1925), who grew up to be a lawyer, Attorney General of Delaware, and U.S. Senator. George eventually gave his father's name to his own son; this second Andrew C. Gray would also serve as Attorney General of Delaware, from 1909 to 1913.
