= Henry A. du Pont =

American military officer and politician (1838–1926)

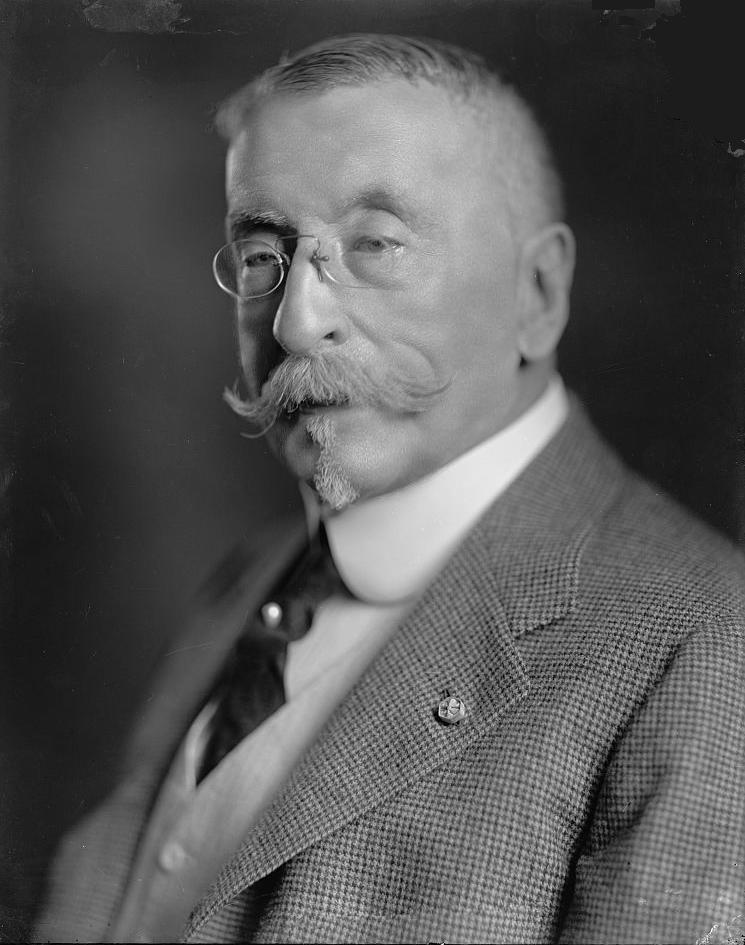
- Du Pont, 1905–1926

United States Senator from Delaware
- In office June 13, 1906 – March 3, 1917
- Preceded by: L. Heisler Ball
- Succeeded by: Josiah O. Wolcott

Personal details
- Born: Henry Algernon du Pont; July 30, 1838 Greenville, Delaware, U.S.
- Died: December 31, 1926 (aged 88) Greenville, Delaware, U.S.
- Resting place: Du Pont de Nemours Cemetery
- Party: Republican
- Spouse: Mary Pauline Foster
- Children: Henry Francis du Pont; Louise Evelina du Pont Crowninshield
- Education: University of Pennsylvania; United States Military Academy
- Occupation: Soldier, politician, railroad executive

Military service
- Allegiance: United States
- Branch/service: United States Army
- Years of service: 1861–1875
- Rank: Brevet lieutenant colonel
- Unit: 5th Regiment, U.S. Artillery
- Battles/wars: American Civil War
- Awards: Medal of Honor

Henry Algernon du Pont (July 30, 1838 – December 31, 1926) was an American military officer, businessman, and politician from Delaware. A member of the du Pont family, he graduated first in his class from West Point shortly after the beginning of the American Civil War and served in the U.S. Army, earning the Medal of Honor for his actions during the Battle of Cedar Creek in October 1864.

After retiring from the army in 1875, he was president of the Wilmington and Northern Railroad Company for 20 years, until 1899. An active member of the Republican Party, he was elected by the state legislature as a U.S. Senator from Delaware, serving most of two terms (June 13, 1906, to March 4, 1917).

du Pont was also an elected member of the American Philosophical Society.

== Early life and education ==
Du Pont was born July 30, 1838, at Eleutherian Mills, near Greenville, Delaware, son of Henry and Louisa Gerhard du Pont and grandson of Eleuthère Irénée du Pont, the founder of E. I. du Pont de Nemours and Company.

He attended the University of Pennsylvania in Philadelphia and graduated first in his class from the United States Military Academy at West Point, New York, in 1861, at the outset of the American Civil War.

== Civil war and military career ==
Du Pont was commissioned a 2nd lieutenant of engineers upon his graduation from West Point on May 6, 1861. Soon after he was promoted to 1st lieutenant in the 5th Regiment, U.S. Artillery, with date of rank of May 14, 1861. He served as a light artillery officer in the Union Army during the war, initially assigned to the defenses of Washington and New York Harbor. From July 6, 1861, to March 24, 1864, he served as regimental adjutant (administrative officer) until he was promoted to captain. He subsequently became chief of artillery in the Army of West Virginia.

Du Pont served in General Philip Sheridan's army in the Shenandoah Valley of northern Virginia. He received the Medal of Honor for his handling of a retreat at the Battle of Cedar Creek, allowing Sheridan to win a victory in the battle. During the war, du Pont received two brevets (honorary promotions). The first was to the rank of major, dated September 19, 1864, for gallant service in the battles of Opequon and Fisher's Hill. The second brevet was to the rank of lieutenant colonel, dated October 19, 1864, for distinguished service at the Battle of Cedar Creek, Virginia.

After the war, du Pont continued as a career officer until resigning on March 1, 1875. In the postwar years, he became a companion of the Military Order of the Loyal Legion of the United States (MOLLUS), an organization for former officers of the Union Army and their descendants. Assigned to the U.S. capital, du Pont was a member of the District of Columbia Commandery, assigned MOLLUS insignia number 10418.

== Marriage and family ==
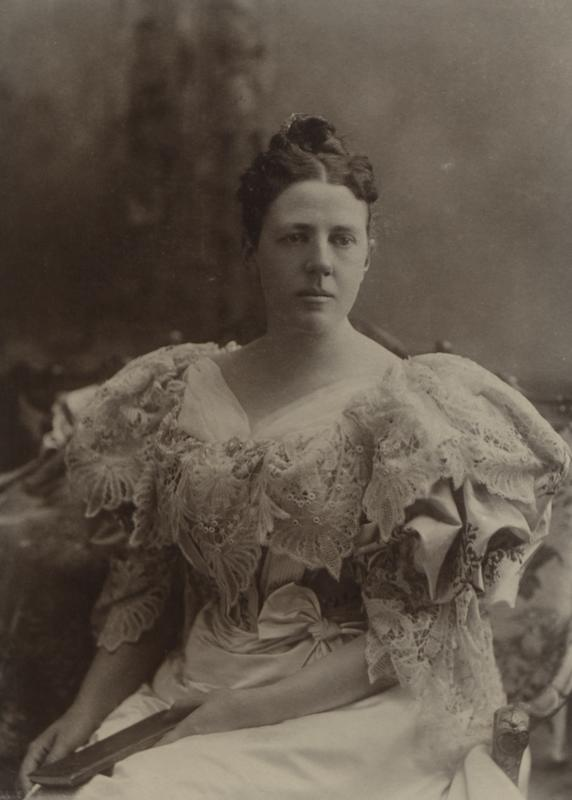
Mary Pauline Foster du Pont

At the age of 36, du Pont married Mary Pauline Foster in 1874. They had two children, Henry Francis du Pont and Louise Evelina du Pont. They lived on his estate, Winterthur, near Greenville, Delaware. The family were members of Christ Episcopal Church in Christiana Hundred.

== Business career ==
In 1875 du Pont returned full-time to Delaware. Within a few years, he became president and general manager of the Wilmington & Northern Railroad Company, serving from 1879 until 1899. During that time, and for the remainder of his life, he also operated an experimental farm on his estate. Since 1951, when his son established it as a museum, the estate has been operated as the Winterthur Museum, Garden and Library near Greenville, Delaware.

== Political career ==
In 1895, du Pont ran for U.S. Senate, and claimed to have been elected. In December 1895, du Pont's supporters filed a petition on his behalf with the Senate Committee on Privileges and Elections, claiming that he had been elected in May for the term that had begun in March of that year. The petition centered on whether William T. Watson, the speaker of the Delaware Senate who had ascended to the governorship upon the death of Joshua H. Marvil on April 8, was entitled to cast a vote in the legislature's joint session on May 9. Without Watson's vote, du Pont would have been election by a vote of 15 to 14, but with his vote, the legislature was deadlocked. The Delaware Constitution prohibits the governor from sitting in the legislature, but questions were raised whether Watson was actually the governor or merely "exercising the office of governor." While the Republican-controlled committee found in du Pont's favor, the Senate as a whole opposed seating him on a party-line vote, with Populists and a Silver Party member joining Democrats, citing a state legislature's right to determine its own membership. Du Pont submitted another petition in January 1897, but did not present new evidence, leading to the committee rejecting his petition.

Du Pont was elected to the U.S. Senate on June 13, 1906, to fill the vacancy in the term beginning March 4, 1905. During this term, he served with the Republican majority in the 59th, 60th, and 61st U.S. Congress. In the 61st Congress, he was chairman of the Committee on Expenditures in the Military Affairs Department.

He was again elected to the U.S. Senate in 1911. During this term, he served with the Republican majority in the 62nd Congress, but was in the minority in the 63rd, and 64th U.S. Congress. In the 62nd Congress he was again Chair of the Committee on Expenditures in the War Department, in the 63rd Congress he was a member of the Committee on Military Affairs, and in the 64th Congress he was a member of the Committee on Transportation and Sale of Meat Products.

In the first popular election of a U.S. Senator in Delaware, du Pont lost his bid for a third full term in 1916 to Democrat Josiah O. Wolcott, the Delaware Attorney General. In all, he served most of two terms from June 13, 1906, to March 4, 1917, during the administrations of U.S. Presidents Theodore Roosevelt, William H. Taft and Woodrow Wilson.

In 1919 du Pont was elected as an honorary member of the Delaware Society of the Cincinnati.

== Death and legacy ==
Du Pont died at his home, Winterthur, and is buried in the Du Pont de Nemours Cemetery at Greenville, Delaware. His son, Henry Francis du Pont, turned his home into the Winterthur Museum, Garden and Library, the nation's premier museum of American decorative arts. Archival materials relating to him are part of the collections held by the Winterthur Library.

== Medal of Honor citation ==
Rank and organization: Captain, 5th U.S. Artillery. Place and date: At Cedar Creek, Va., October 19, 1864. Entered service at: Wilmington, Del. Birth: Eleutherian Mills, Del. Date of issue: April 2, 1898.

Citation:

By his distinguished gallantry, and voluntary exposure to the enemy's fire at a critical moment, when the Union line had been broken, encouraged his men to stand to their guns, checked the advance of the enemy, and brought off most of his pieces.

== In popular culture ==
Du Pont was portrayed by David Arquette in the 2014 film Field of Lost Shoes, which depicted the Battle of New Market in May 1864.

== Almanac ==
Elections are held the first Tuesday after November 1. The General Assembly chose the U.S. Senators, who took office March 4 for a six-year term. After 1913 they were popularly elected.

Public offices
Office	Type	Location	Began office	Ended office	notes
U.S. Senator	Legislature	Washington	June 13, 1906	March 3, 1911	
U.S. Senator	Legislature	Washington	March 4, 1911	March 3, 1917	

United States Congressional service
Dates	Congress	Chamber	Majority	President	Committees	Class/district
1905–1907	59th	U.S. Senate	Republican	Theodore Roosevelt		class 1
1907–1909	60th	U.S. Senate	Republican	Theodore Roosevelt		class 1
1909–1911	61st	U.S. Senate	Republican	William Howard Taft		class 1
1911–1913	62nd	U.S. Senate	Republican	William Howard Taft		class 1
1913–1915	63rd	U.S. Senate	Democratic	Woodrow Wilson		class 1
1915–1917	64th	U.S. Senate	Democratic	Woodrow Wilson		class 1

Election results
Year	Office	Subject	Party	Votes	%	Opponent	Party	Votes	%
1916	U.S. Senator	Henry A. du Pont	Republican	22,925	45%	Josiah O. Wolcott	Democratic	25,434	50%
1916	U.S. Senator	Henry A. du Pont	Republican	22,925	45%	Hiram R. Burton	Progressive	2,361	5%

== See also ==
- List of Medal of Honor recipients for the Battle of Cedar Creek
- List of American Civil War Medal of Honor recipients: A–F

== Notes ==
Party political offices
First	Republican nominee for U.S. Senator from Delaware (Class 1); 1916	Succeeded by T. Coleman du Pont
Political offices
U.S. Senate
Preceded by L. Heisler Ball	U.S. Senator (Class 1) from Delaware; 1906-1917; Served alongside: J. Frank Allee, Harry A. Richardson, Willard Saulsbury, Jr.	Succeeded by Josiah O. Wolcott
