= Willard Saulsbury Jr. =

American politician (1861–1927)

Willard Saulsbury
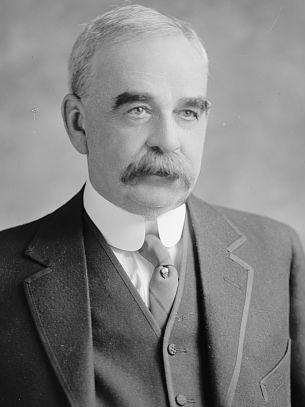
- Saulsbury, 1905–1927

President pro tempore of the United States Senate
- In office December 14, 1916 – March 3, 1919
- Preceded by: James Paul Clarke
- Succeeded by: Albert B. Cummins

Secretary of the Senate Democratic Caucus
- In office March 4, 1913 – December 14, 1916
- Leader: John W. Kern
- Preceded by: William E. Chilton
- Succeeded by: Key Pittman (Acting)

United States Senator from Delaware
- In office March 4, 1913 – March 3, 1919
- Preceded by: Harry A. Richardson
- Succeeded by: L. Heisler Ball

Personal details
- Born: April 17, 1861 Georgetown, Delaware, U.S.
- Died: February 20, 1927 (aged 65) Wilmington, Delaware, U.S.
- Party: Democratic
- Spouse: May Lammot du Pont
- Relations: Gove Saulsbury (uncle); Eli Saulsbury (uncle)
- Parent: Willard Saulsbury Sr. (father)
- Education: University of Virginia, Charlottesville
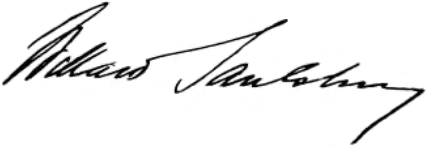
- Signature

Willard Saulsbury Jr. (April 17, 1861 – February 20, 1927) was an American lawyer and politician from Wilmington, in New Castle County, Delaware. He was a member of the Democratic Party who served as U.S. Senator from Delaware and President Pro Tempore of the U.S. Senate.

== Early life and family ==
Saulsbury was born in Georgetown, Delaware, son of Willard Saulsbury Sr. and nephew of Gove Saulsbury and Eli Saulsbury. He married May Lammot du Pont, the granddaughter of Charles I. du Pont. He attended private schools and the University of Virginia at Charlottesville, where he was a member of St. Anthony Hall. Subsequently, he studied law, was admitted to the bar in 1882, and commenced practice in Wilmington, Delaware.

He was president of the New Castle Bar Association and chairman of the board of censors.

== Political career ==
Saulsbury was a member of the Democratic National Committee from 1908 until 1920. He ran for U.S. Senator in 1899, 1901, 1903, 1905, 1907, and 1911, but Republicans controlled the state legislature and he was unsuccessful.

Democrats were in control of the legislature in 1913, the last time U.S. Senators were chosen by state legislators. Saulsbury was the preference of most Democrats and obtained the required majority after several days of balloting. During this term, he served with the Democratic majority in the 63rd, 64th, and 65th Congresses from March 4, 1913, until March 3, 1919. He was the President Pro Tempore of the Senate during the 64th and 65th Congresses. In the 63rd, 64th, and 65th Congresses he was Chairman of the Committee on Coast and Insular Survey, and in the 65th Congress he was also a member of the Committee on Pacific Islands and Puerto Rico.

By the time his term expired, the Seventeenth Amendment to the United States Constitution had been enshrined, so he had to face voters for the first time. In the election of 1918, he lost to Republican L. Heisler Ball, a former U.S. Senator. This loss has been attributed to his opposition to women's suffrage in the United States and his refusal to support the Nineteenth Amendment to the United States Constitution.

== Later years ==
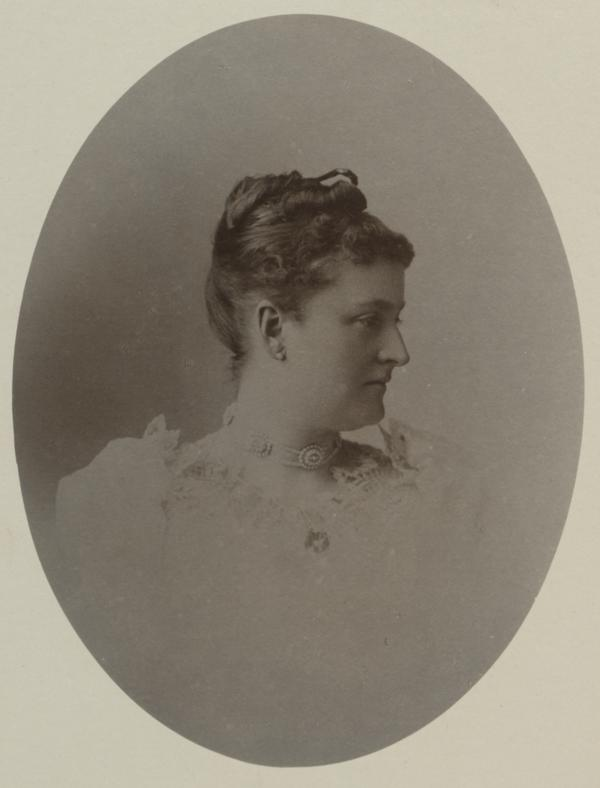
May Lammot du Pont Saulsbury

After leaving the Senate, he was a member of the advisory committee of the Conference on Limitation of Armaments in Washington, D.C., in 1921 and 1922, and a member of the Pan American Conference in Santiago, Chile, in 1923.

He continued the practice of law in Wilmington and Washington, D.C., until his death.

Saulsbury died in Wilmington and is buried in the Christ Episcopal Church Cemetery at Dover.

Public Offices
Office	Type	Location	Began office	Ended office	notes
U.S. Senator	Legislature	Washington	March 4, 1913	March 3, 1919	

United States Congressional service
Dates	Congress	Chamber	Majority	President	Committees	Class/District
1913–1915	63rd	U.S. Senate	Democratic	Woodrow Wilson		class 2
1915–1917	64th	U.S. Senate	Democratic	Woodrow Wilson		class 2
1917–1919	65th	U.S. Senate	Democratic	Woodrow Wilson		class 2

Election results
Year	Office	Subject	Party	Votes	%	Opponent	Party	Votes	%
1918	U.S. Senator	Willard Saulsbury Jr.	Democratic	20,113	48%	L. Heisler Ball	Republican	21,519	51%

U.S. Senate
Preceded by Harry A. Richardson	U.S. Senator (Class 2) from Delaware; 1913–1919; Served alongside: Henry A. du Pont, Josiah O. Wolcott	Succeeded by L. Heisler Ball
Preceded by Charles E. Townsend	Chair of the Senate Coast and Insular Survey Committee; 1913–1918	Succeeded by Edward Gay
Preceded by John F. Shafroth	Chair of the Senate Pacific Islands and Puerto Rico Committee; 1918–1919	Succeeded by Albert B. Fall as Chair of the Senate Pacific Islands, Puerto Rico and the Virgin Islands Committee
Party political offices
Preceded by William E. Chilton	Secretary of the Senate Democratic Caucus; 1913–1916	Succeeded by Key Pittman; Acting
First	Democratic nominee for U.S. Senator from Delaware (Class 2); 1918	Succeeded by James M. Tunnell
Political offices
Preceded by James Paul Clarke	President pro tempore of the U.S. Senate; 1916–1919	Succeeded by Albert B. Cummins
