= 1996 United States Senate election in Delaware =

- November 5, 1996
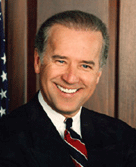

Nominee	Joe Biden	Raymond Clatworthy
Party	Democratic	Republican
Popular vote	165,465	105,088
Percentage	60.04%	38.13%
- Biden: 50–60% 60–70% 70–80% 80–90% Clatworthy: 50–60%
U.S. senator before election
Joe Biden
Democratic
Elected U.S. Senator
Joe Biden
Democratic

The 1996 United States Senate election in Delaware was held on November 5, 1996. Incumbent Democratic U.S. Senator Joe Biden won re-election to a fifth term. This was the first Senate election in his career in which Biden's margin of victory decreased from the prior election.

== Republican primary ==
=== Candidates ===
- Raymond Clatworthy, businessman, Christian radio station owner
- Vance Phillips, farmer
- Wilfred J. Plomis, oil and gas consultant, former apartment complex manager

=== Results ===
Republican primary results
Party	Candidate	Votes	%
Republican	Raymond J. Clatworthy	18,638	82.24%
Republican	Vance Phillips	3,307	14.59%
Republican	Wilfred Plomis	717	3.17%
Total votes		22,662	100.00%

== General Election ==
=== Campaign ===
In February 1996, Biden sold his home to John Cochran; a senior executive for MBNA. A pollster from Clatsworthy's campaign suggested in a phone survey that Cochran had paid twice the value of the house. In reality, Cochran had paid the $1.2 million it was on the market for. "Officials" from MBNA dismissed what the pollster had to say and Biden would make a 1992 document from the Delaware Appraisal Group public that said the home's value was $1.2 million. In 1998, the conservative magazine The American Spectator published an article calling Biden "The Senator from MBNA".

Libertarian Party NEWS reported that Mark Jones who was Libertarian Party's candidate would be the first candidate from the party in the state to campaign full time as he resigned his position as an assistant professor at Goldey–Beacom College.

=== Debates ===
==== First ====
The first senatorial debate would be held on September 29, 1996, in Wilmington and was hosted by WHYY-TV. The candidates that participated in the debate were: Joe Biden, Raymond Clatworthy, and Mark Jones.

The debate would begin with candidates being given an introductory statement for two minutes. Biden would say his first followed by Jones and Clatworthy would last.

After the opening statements there would be a discussion on social security with Biden and Clatworthy primarily participating although Jones did interject occasionally. After a discussion about social security ended, one of the moderators would ask the candidates which of the Founding Fathers they liked the best. Jones responded first saying Thomas Jefferson while Clatworthy said George Washington. Biden answered differently saying that Abraham Lincoln was his favorite president and listed the accomplishments of presidents he thought were noble along with their achievements. He was reminded by a moderator who reminded him he was talking about the founding fathers. He would say that Thomas Jefferson was the most significant but didn't mention him as his favorite.

For the rest of the debate topics discussed included Clatworthy's ties with the Christian Coalition, abortion, crime, terrorism, and foreign policy. A moderator would ask a final question to the candidates about how they saw themselves as being different from each other.

==== Second ====
The second senatorial debate would occur on October 29, 1996, in New Castle. The four candidates who would participate in the debate were: Joe Biden, Raymond J. Clatworthy, Mark Jones, and Jacqueline Kossoff.

=== Candidates ===
- Joe Biden, incumbent Delaware Senator running for a fifth consecutive term
- Raymond Clatworthy, businessman
- Mark Jones, assistant professor of computer science at Goldey–Beacom College and former faculty member of the University of Delaware.
- Jacqueline Kossoff

== Results ==
General election results
Party	Candidate	Votes	%	±%
Democratic	Joe Biden (incumbent)	165,465	60.04%	−2.64%
Republican	Raymond J. Clatworthy	105,088	38.13%	+2.30%
Libertarian	Mark Jones	3,340	1.21%	−0.28%
Natural Law	Jacqueline Kossoff	1,698	0.62%	
Majority		60,377	21.91%	−4.94%
Turnout		275,591		
Democratic hold		Swing		

== See also ==
- 1996 United States Senate elections
