= 1928 United States Senate election in Delaware =

- November 6, 1928
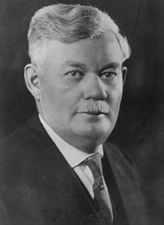

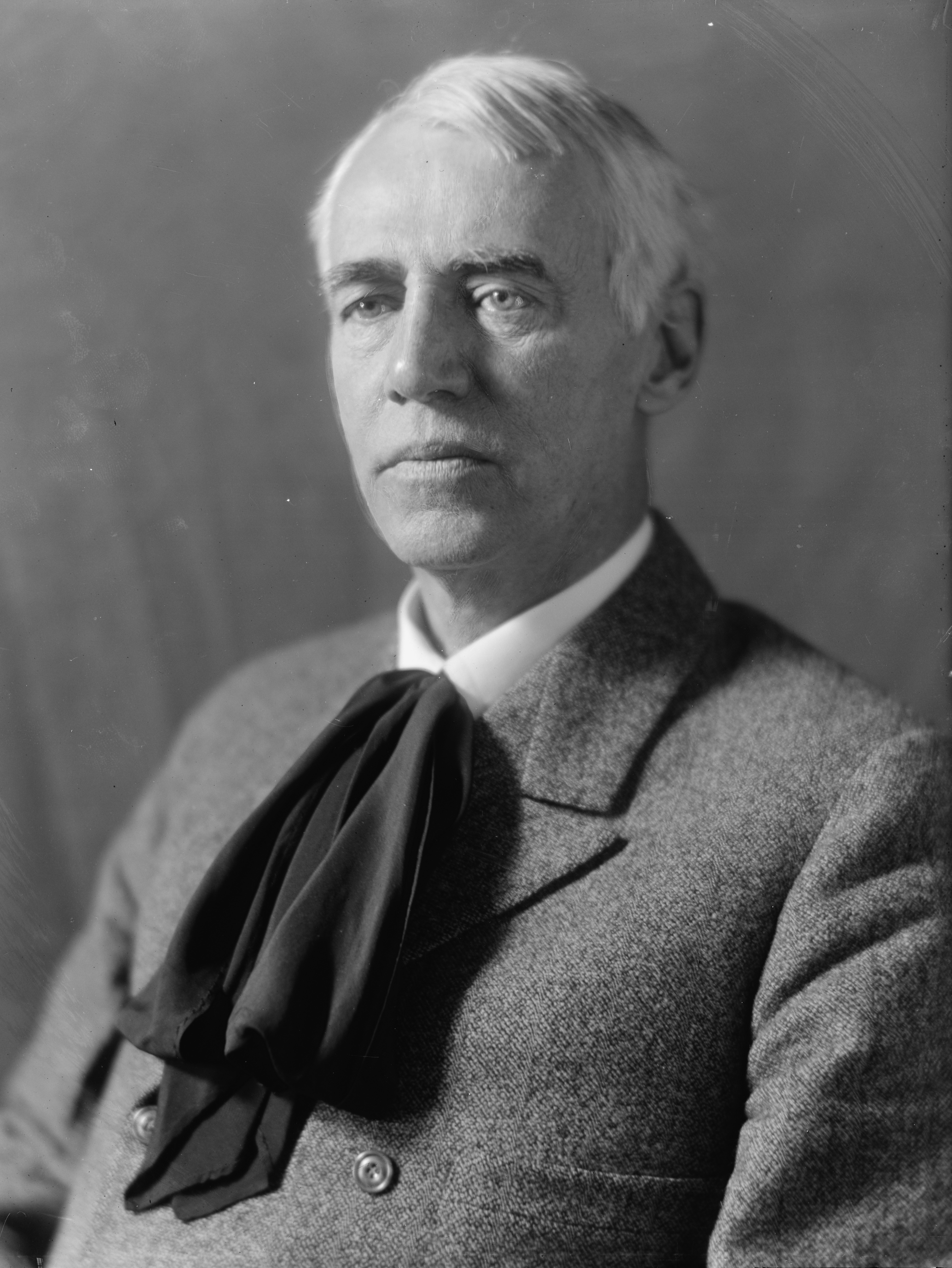
Nominee	John G. Townsend Jr.	Thomas F. Bayard Jr.
Party	Republican	Democratic
Popular vote	63,725	40,828
Percentage	60.95%	39.05%
- County results Townsend: 50–60% 60–70%
U.S. senator before election
Thomas F. Bayard Jr.
Democratic
Elected U.S. Senator
John G. Townsend Jr.
Republican

The 1928 United States Senate election in Delaware took place on November 6, 1928. Incumbent Democratic U.S. Senator Thomas F. Bayard Jr. ran for a third term in office, but was defeated by former Republican Governor John G. Townsend Jr. in a landslide.

== General election ==
=== Candidates ===
- Thomas F. Bayard Jr., incumbent Senator since 1922 (Democratic)
- John G. Townsend Jr., former Governor of Delaware from 1917 to 1921 (Republican)

=== Results ===
1928 U.S. Senate election in Delaware
Party	Candidate	Votes	%	±%
Republican	John G. Townsend Jr.	63,725	60.95%	▲11.57
Democratic	Thomas F. Bayard Jr. (incumbent)	40,828	39.05%	▼10.76
Total votes		104,553	100.00%	
Republican gain from Democratic				

== See also ==
- 1928 United States Senate elections
