= 1916 United States Senate election in Delaware =

- November 7, 1916
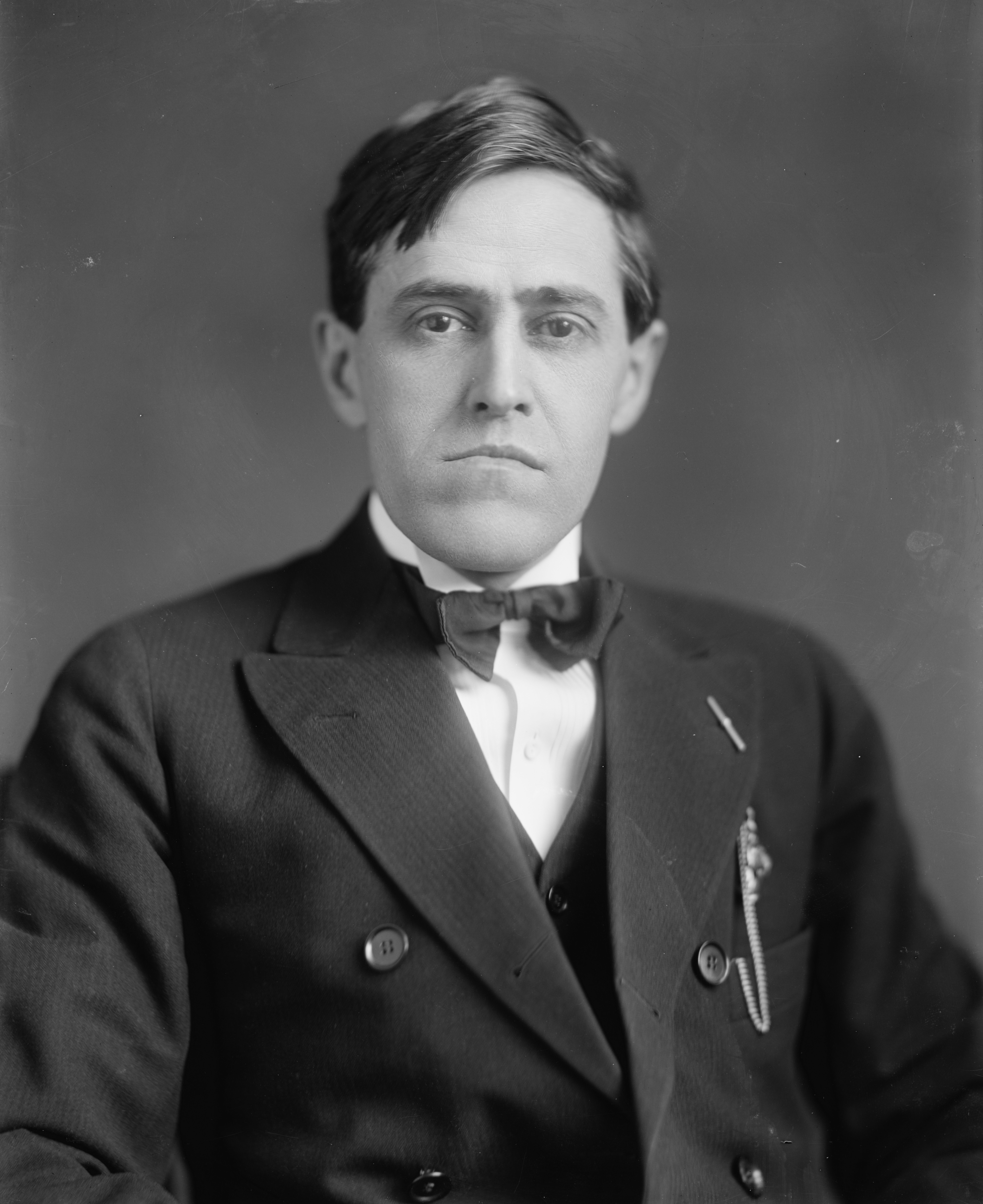

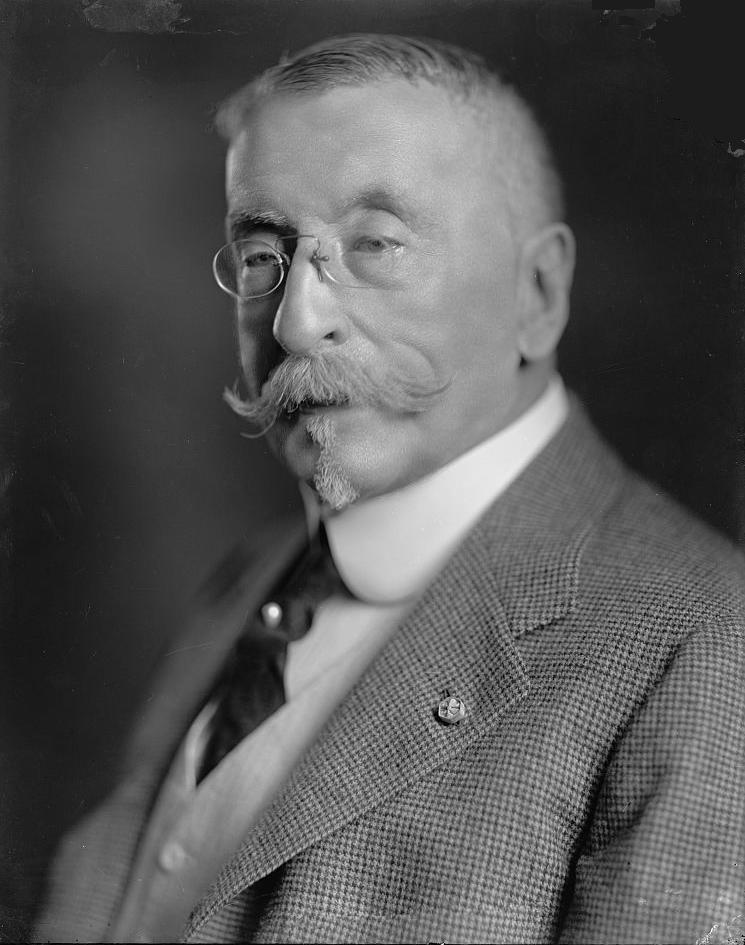
| Nominee | Josiah O. Wolcott | Henry A. du Pont |
| Party | Democratic | Republican |
| Popular vote | 25,434 | 22,925 |
| Percentage | 49.67% | 44.77% |
- County results Wolcott: 40–50% 50–60%
U.S. senator before election
Henry A. du Pont
Republican
Elected U.S. Senator
Josiah O. Wolcott
Democratic

The 1916 United States Senate election in Delaware took place on November 7, 1916.

Incumbent Republican Senator Henry A. du Pont ran for re-election to a third term in office, but was defeated by Democrat Josiah O. Wolcott. This was the first U.S. Senate election in Delaware in which the people directly elected a U.S. senator.

== General election ==
=== Candidates ===
- Hiram R. Burton, former Republican U.S. representative from Sussex County (Progressive)
- Henry A. du Pont, incumbent senator since 1906 (Republican)
- William C. Ferris (Socialist)
- Josiah O. Wolcott, Delaware attorney general (Democratic)

=== Results ===
1916 U.S. Senate election in Delaware
| Party | Candidate | Votes | % |
|---|---|---|---|
| Democratic | Josiah O. Wolcott | 25,434 | 49.67% |
| Republican | Henry A. du Pont (incumbent) | 22,925 | 44.77% |
| Progressive | Hiram R. Burton | 2,361 | 4.61% |
| Socialist | William C. Ferris | 490 | 0.96% |
| Total votes | | 51,210 | 100.00% |
| Democratic gain from Republican | | | |

== See also ==
- 1916 United States Senate elections
