= Daniel O. Hastings =

American politician (1874–1966)

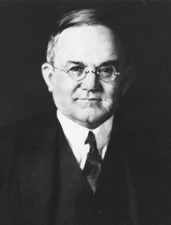
- In office December 10, 1928 – January 3, 1937
- Preceded by: T. Coleman du Pont
- Succeeded by: James H. Hughes

Delaware Secretary of State
- In office 1909
- Governor: Simeon S. Pennewill
- Preceded by: Joseph L. Cahall
- Succeeded by: William T. Smithers

Personal details
- Born: March 5, 1874 Princess Anne, Maryland, U.S.
- Died: May 9, 1966 (aged 92) Wilmington, Delaware, U.S.
- Party: Republican
- Spouse(s): Carrie Lee Saxton (m. 1898-1930, her death); Elsie May Saxton (m. 1931-1966, his death)
- Education: Columbian University
- Profession: lawyer

Daniel Oren Hastings (March 5, 1874 – May 9, 1966) was an American lawyer and politician from Wilmington, New Castle County, Delaware. He was a member of the Republican Party who served two terms as a U.S. senator from Delaware.

== Early life and family ==
Hastings was born in Somerset County, Maryland, near Princess Anne, Maryland. He studied law at Columbian University, now George Washington University, and was admitted to the Delaware Bar in 1902. He lived and practiced law in Wilmington, Delaware.

== Political career ==
Hastings served as Deputy Attorney General of Delaware from 1904 until 1909, Secretary of State of Delaware from January 1909 to June 1909. He resigned to accept an appointment as Associate Justice of the Delaware Supreme Court, and served there until his resignation in January 1911. He was Special Counsel for the Delaware General Assembly in 1911, City Solicitor of Wilmington from 1911 until 1917, and Judge of the Municipal Court of Wilmington from 1920 until 1929.

Hastings was appointed to the U. S. Senate upon the resignation of U.S. Senator T. Coleman du Pont, December 10, 1928 and served the remainder of his term. During this term, he served with the Republican majority in the 70th and 71st Congress. He was elected in his own right to a full term as U. S. Senator, in 1930, defeating Democrat Thomas F. Bayard, Jr., a former U. S. Senator.

During this term, he served with the Republican majority in the 72nd Congress, but was in the minority during the 73rd and 74th Congress. Hastings lost his bid for a second full term in 1936 to Democrat James H. Hughes, a lawyer from Dover, Delaware. In all he served from December 10, 1928, to January 2, 1937, during the administrations of U.S. Presidents Herbert Hoover and Franklin D. Roosevelt. He then returned to the practice of law in Wilmington.

== Death and legacy ==
Hastings died at Wilmington and is buried in the Lower Brandywine Cemetery, near Centerville, Delaware.

== Almanac ==
Elections are held the first Tuesday after November 1. U.S. Senators are popularly elected and took office March 4 for a six-year term.

Public Offices
Office	Type	Location	Began office	Ended office	notes
Secretary of State	Executive	Dover	January 1909	June 1909	Delaware
U.S. Senator	Legislature	Washington	December 10, 1928	March 3, 1931	
U.S. Senator	Legislature	Washington	March 4, 1931	January 3, 1937	

United States Congressional service
Dates	Congress	Chamber	Majority	President	Committees	Class/District
1927–1929	70th	U.S. Senate	Republican	Calvin Coolidge		class 2
1929–1931	71st	U.S. Senate	Republican	Herbert Hoover		class 2
1931–1933	72nd	U.S. Senate	Republican	Herbert Hoover		class 2
1933–1935	73rd	U.S. Senate	Democratic	Franklin D. Roosevelt		class 2
1935–1937	74th	U.S. Senate	Democratic	Franklin D. Roosevelt		class 2

Election results
Year	Office	Subject	Party	Votes	%	Opponent	Party	Votes	%
1930	U.S. Senator	Daniel O. Hastings	Republican	47,909	54%	Thomas F. Bayard, Jr.	Democratic	39,881	45%
1936	U.S. Senator	Daniel O. Hastings	Republican	52,469	41%	James H. Hughes	Democratic	67,136	53%

Party political offices
Preceded by T. Coleman du Pont	Republican nominee for U.S. Senator from Delaware (Class 2); 1930, 1936	Succeeded by C. Douglass Buck
Political offices
U.S. Senate
Preceded by T. Coleman du Pont	U.S. Senator (Class 2) from Delaware; 1928-1937; Served alongside: Thomas F. Bayard Jr., John G. Townsend Jr.	Succeeded by James H. Hughes
