= Wesley College (Delaware) =

Private college in Dover, Delaware, US (1873–2021)

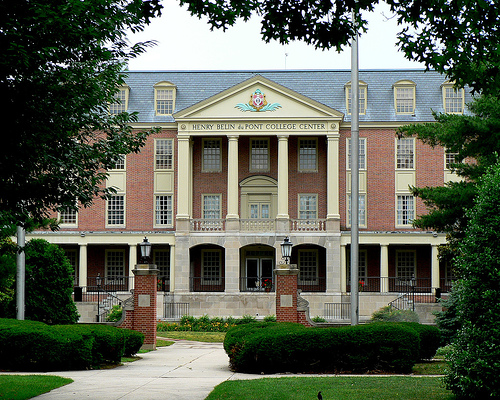
- Wesley College, now part of Delaware State University as DSU Downtown
- Former names: Wilmington Conference Academy (1873–1918); Wesley Collegiate Institute (1918–1941); Wesley Junior College (1941–1958)
- Motto: Great Things Await
- Type: Private liberal arts college
- Active: 1873; 153 years ago – 2021; 5 years ago
- Religious affiliation: United Methodist Church
- Academic affiliations: Space Grant
- Location: Dover, Delaware, United States
- Campus: 50 acres (20 ha); Small city
- Colors: Blue and white
- Nickname: Wolverines
- Sporting affiliations: NCAA Division III – Atlantic East (until 2021)
- Website: wesley.edu

Wesley College was a private liberal arts college in Dover, Delaware. It was acquired by Delaware State University (DSU) in 2021 and is now the DSU Downtown campus.

== History ==
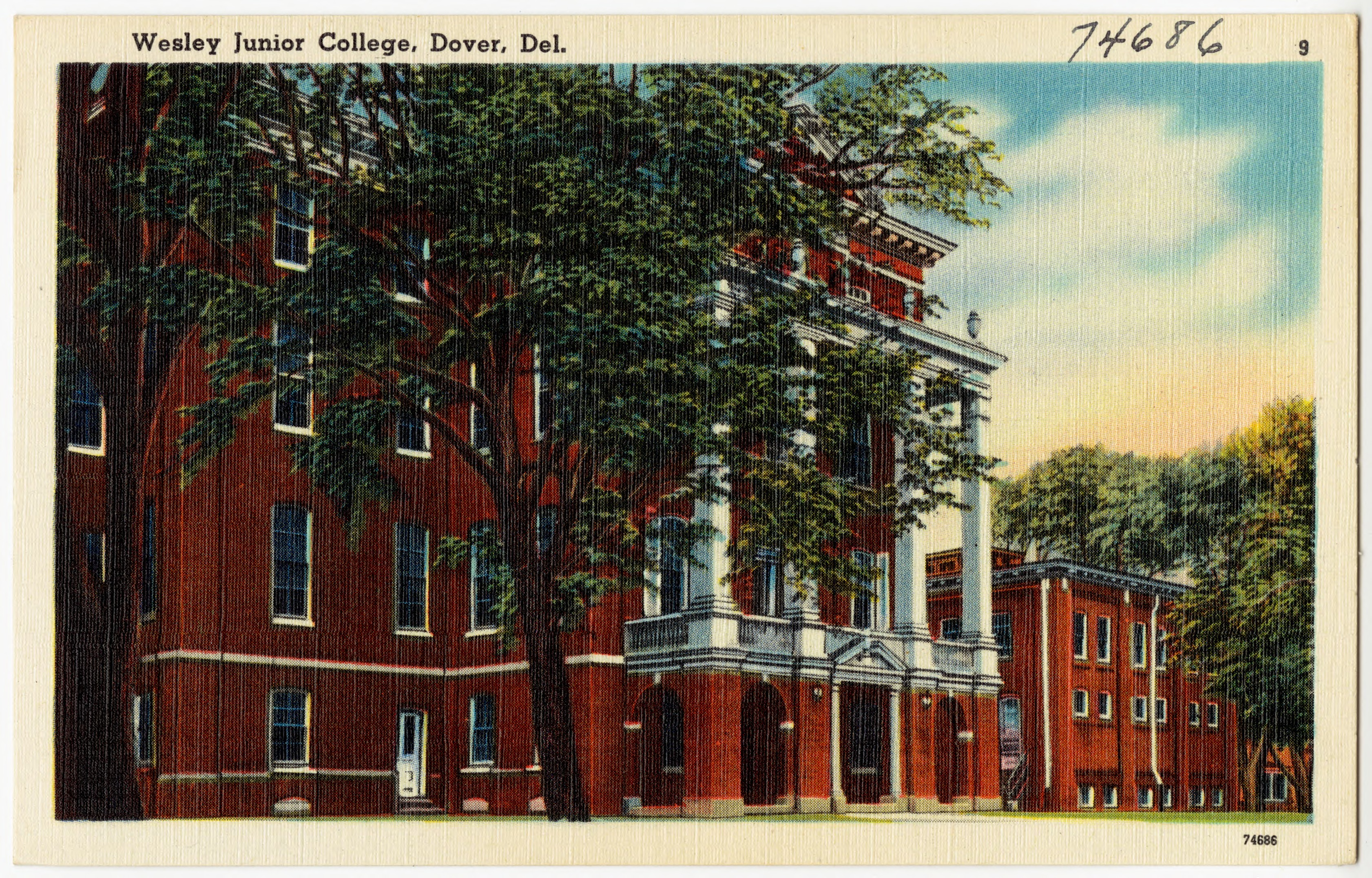
Postcard of Wesley Junior College

The institution was founded in 1873 as Wilmington Conference Academy, a prep school. During this period Annie Jump Cannon, a prominent astronomer who pioneered stellar classification, graduated valedictorian from Wilmington Conference Academy in 1880. It became a two-year college in 1918 and renamed the Wesley Collegiate Institute. It was renamed again in 1941 as Wesley Junior College, and again in 1958 as Wesley College. The institution conferred its first four-year degrees in 1978.

In its last decades, the college experienced significant financial challenges and relied on state funding and grants. At one point in 2019, had the state not given Wesley $3 million, students would have lost access to federal financial aid and salaries would have been at risk. In early 2021, the college faculty voted "no confidence" against Wesley's last president, Robert E. Clark II, but Wesley College's board of trustees subsequently dismissed the resolution and supported him.

On June 30, 2020, Delaware State University (DSU) began the formal process of purchasing Wesley College. This made DSU "the first historically Black college or university to acquire another college." The acquisition was finalized one year later, on July 1, 2021. Approximately 60 percent of the Wesley community were offered employment by Delaware State University. DSU took on Wesley College's debts and did not directly pay to purchase the university. All Wesley students with non-adverse records were permitted to become DSU students. After the acquisition, the campus was known as DSU Downtown, while the Wesley name remained attached to the Wesley College of Health and Behavioral Sciences housed at the campus.

== Academics ==
Prior to ceasing operations, many of its students pursued a liberal arts program of study. At its close, Wesley College had 917 students.

== Athletics ==
The institution competed in National Collegiate Athletic Association's Division III athletics in the Atlantic East Conference. Its teams were known as the Wolverines.

== Notable alumni ==
- William N. Andrews (1898) – U.S. House of Representatives
- Steve Azzanesi – college football coach
- Clarence Bailey – professional football player
- Larry Beavers – professional football player
- Bill Belleville – environmental writer, documentary filmmaker, and lecturer
- Colin R.J. Bonini (1991) – Republican Party politician, including serving as a member of the Delaware Senate from the 16th district (since 1995)
- Franklin Brockson (1890) – U.S. House of Representatives
- Joseph L. Cahall (c. 1880s) – Republican Party politician who served as Secretary of State of Delaware
- Joe Callahan (B.S. 2016) – quarterback for the Philadelphia Eagles of the National Football League (NFL)
- Annie Jump Cannon (1880) – Astronomer
- Steve Colavito – professional football player
- Bill Collick – college football coach and athletics administrator
- Ronald S. Dancer – New Jersey General Assembly
- William D. Denney – Governor of Delaware and Delaware House of Representatives
- Wayne Gilchrest (A.A., 1971) – Republican Party politician, including serving as U.S. Representative for Maryland's 1st congressional district (1991–2009)
- Matt Gono (2017) – professional football player for the Atlanta Falcons of the National Football League (NFL)
- John B. Goodman – polo player
- Bob Hannah – college baseball coach
- William P. Jackson – Treasurer of Maryland and United States Senator
- Thomas B. McCabe – chairman of the Federal Reserve and president and CEO of Scott Paper Company
- Ernie McCook – college football coach
- Mark Meseroll – professional football player
- Charles M. Oberly, III (A.A., 1966) – lawyer and Democratic Party politician, including serving as Delaware Attorney General (1983–1995); U.S. Attorney for the District of Delaware
- Eunan O'Neill (non-degreed) – Irish television presenter
- John Palermo (non-degreed) – college football coach
- Simeon S. Pennewill – Governor of Delaware and Delaware Senate
- Bryan Robinson – professional football player; awarded all-American football player
- Charles L. Terry Jr. – Governor of Delaware and Chief Justice of the Delaware Supreme Court
- Ebrahim Victory (nondegreed) – mechanical engineer and television presenter
- Rebecca Walker – Delaware House of Representatives
- Carolyn Bunny Welsh – Republican Party politician, former sheriff of Chester County, Pennsylvania
- Josiah O. Wolcott – Chancellor of the Delaware Court of Chancery, United States Senator, and Attorney General of Delaware

== Notable faculty and staff ==
- Bob Andrus – head football coach
- Steve Azzanesi – football coach
- Earl D. Brooks II – executive vice president and professor of science and president of Trine University
- Mike Drass – head football coach
- William N. Johnston – 16th president of Welsey College
- Tim Keating – head football coach
- Tripp Keister – baseball coach
- Chip Knapp – assistant football coach
- David Laganella – music professor
- John Palermo – football coach
- Clarence A. Short – president of Wesley Collegiate Institute in 1926
- Leroy Thompson – assistant football coach

== See also ==
- List of colleges and universities in Delaware
