= 1934 United States Senate election in Delaware =

- November 6, 1934
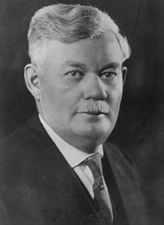

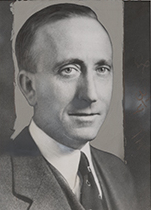
Nominee	John G. Townsend Jr.	Wilbur L. Adams
Party	Republican	Democratic
Popular vote	52,829	45,771
Percentage	53.27%	46.16%
- County results Townsend: 50–60% Adams: 50–60%
U.S. senator before election
John G. Townsend Jr.
Republican
Elected U.S. Senator
John G. Townsend Jr.
Republican

The 1934 United States Senate election in Delaware took place on November 6, 1934. Incumbent Republican U.S. Senator John G. Townsend Jr. was re-elected to a second term in office over Democratic U.S. Representative Wilbur L. Adams.

== General election ==
=== Candidates ===
- Wilbur L. Adams, U.S. Representative at-large since 1933 (Democratic)
- John G. Townsend Jr., incumbent Senator since 1929 (Republican)
- Fred W. Whiteside (Socialist)
- John T. Wlodkoski (Communist)

=== Results ===
1934 U.S. Senate election in Delaware
Party	Candidate	Votes	%	±%
Republican	John G. Townsend Jr. (incumbent)	52,829	53.27%	▼7.68
Democratic	Wilbur L. Adams	45,771	46.16%	▲7.11
Socialist	Fred W. Whiteside	497	0.50%	N/A
Communist	John T. Wlodkoski	69	0.07%	N/A
Total votes		99,166	100.00%	
Republican hold				

== See also ==
- 1934 United States Senate elections
