= 1946 United States Senate election in Delaware =

- November 5, 1946
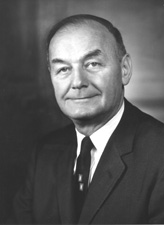

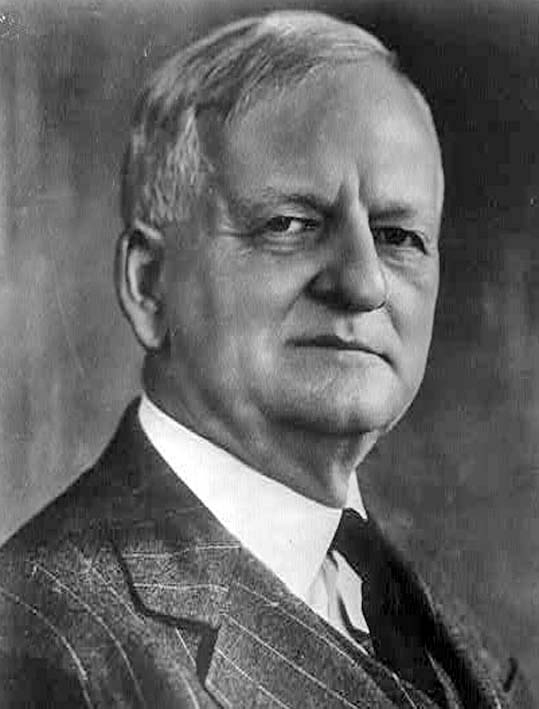
Nominee	John J. Williams	James M. Tunnell
Party	Republican	Democratic
Popular vote	62,603	50,910
Percentage	55.15%	44.85%
- County results Williams: 50–60%
U.S. senator before election
James M. Tunnell
Democratic
Elected U.S. Senator
John J. Williams
Republican

The 1946 United States Senate election in Delaware took place on November 5, 1946. Incumbent Democratic U.S. Senator James M. Tunnell ran for re-election to a second term in office, but was defeated in a landslide by Republican John J. Williams, a businessman and member of the Millsboro Town Council.

== General election ==
=== Candidates ===
- James M. Tunnell, incumbent Senator since 1941 (Democratic)
- John J. Williams, member of the Millsboro Town Council (Republican)

=== Results ===
1946 U.S. Senate election in Delaware
Party	Candidate	Votes	%	±%
Republican	John J. Williams	62,603	55.15%	▲7.85
Democratic	James M. Tunnell (incumbent)	50,910	44.85%	▼5.78
Total votes		113,513	100.00%	
Republican gain from Democratic				

== See also ==
- 1946 United States Senate elections
