= Joseph L. Cahall =

American lawyer and politician (c. 1860 – 1937)

Secretary of State of Delaware
- In office January 1905 – January 1909
- Governor: Preston Lea
- Preceded by: Caleb R. Layton
- Succeeded by: Daniel O. Hastings

Personal details
- Born: c. 1860 Bridgeville, Delaware
- Died: June 28, 1937 (aged 77) Georgetown, Delaware
- Party: Republican
- Education: Wilmington Conference Academy; University of Pennsylvania
- Occupation: Politician · lawyer

Joseph Laws Cahall (c. 1860 – June 28, 1937) was an American lawyer and politician. A Republican, he attended the University of Pennsylvania and became a practicing attorney in the 1880s. He started serving with the local county government in 1890 and later became an active member of the Union Republican faction of the Republican Party. (Note: There was at the time a division between the state's Republican party over supporters of Henry A. du Pont for the United States Senate, who were known as "Regular Republicans," and those who supported J. Edward Addicks, who were known as "Union Republicans.") Appointed as Secretary of State of Delaware in 1905, he served until 1909 in the position. Afterwards, Cahall remained active in local politics and continued practicing law until his death in 1937.

== Early life and education ==
Cahall was born in Bridgeville, Delaware, around 1860. His father was a physician while his mother was a daughter of state governor William Cannon. He was educated in Bridgeville before moving to Dover, where he attended Wilmington Conference Academy. He for a time co-operated in Elkton a shoe dealing firm by the name of Cahall & Davis, before selling his share in 1883. After his graduation from the Conference Academy, he entered the University of Pennsylvania and began attending their law school.

== Career ==
Following his graduation from the University of Pennsylvania, Cahall began practicing law in Philadelphia before moving to Georgetown, Delaware, in 1889. He partnered with Charles Moore, the son of former Delaware attorney general Jacob Moore, but later separated in 1898 and practiced alone. Cahall was elected a clerk of the Sussex County Levy Court (Note: The Levy Court was the governing body of the county at the time.) in 1890 and later became a counsel and elected attorney, serving with the court until at least 1900. He joined the Sussex County bar as well and was made secretary in 1892. He also served that year as a clerk of the county Board of Canvass, which determined the winners of local elections.

Cahall was a member of the Republican Party and was part of the "Union Republican" or "Addicks" faction. He was a nominee for the Delaware Constitutional Convention of 1896–97 from the Union Republican side. He was active in the Addicks Republican politics and presided over some of their meetings. In 1901, he was proposed by the "Regular Republican" faction as a candidate they would support for the United States Senate, but he "made a vigorous speech against any such arrangement." He instead became the chairman of the Addicks Republican committee of Sussex County. As a result of the "Union Republican" and "Regular Republican" factions being unable to agree upon a candidate for Senate, both of Delaware's seats remained vacant for two years.

In 1904, he and Hiram R. Burton were considered the top two candidates for the Republican nomination for the United States House of Representatives. Cahall had the backing of Secretary of State of Delaware Caleb R. Layton as well as several other influential party members, but opted to nominate Burton for the position, who went on to win the election. Although a Union Republican, he was described as "not altogether an Addicks man" and was also well-liked by the Regular Republicans. He worked to bring unity between the two sides and was named chairman of a joint committee established by the factions.

In January 1905, Cahall was appointed by newly elected governor Preston Lea to be the Secretary of State of Delaware, succeeding Layton. His role earned him annually from $12,000 to $15,000 and the Smyrna Times noted that "The selection of Mr. Cahall for the office of secretary of state is a distinct victory for the Union Republicans beaded by Senator Simeon S. Pennewill, Representative A. R. Benson and Representative John Vandenburg, who have been working unceasingly in behalf of Mr. Cahall." The Morning News of Wilmington said that his appointment "gives great satisfaction here. Many Republicans have expressed themselves as being pleased with the selection."

At the end of his first year in office, Cahall was part of a dispute with Layton over the role of county Union Republican chairman; differing views between them, as well as the belief of some that Cahall was too busy in Secretary of State duties to chair the faction effectively, led to him being ousted as chairman in January 1906, although rather than Layton succeeding him, John W. Bennett was elected to the position as a compromise. After having served as Secretary of State for four years, Cahall retired and was succeeded by Daniel O. Hastings in January 1909.

After his time in office, Cahall returned home in Georgetown and continued his practice of law. He continued his role as an attorney for the Sussex County Levy Court. In October 1909, he was appointed by governor Simeon S. Pennewill to be a member of the State Revenue and Taxation Commission. In August 1910, he was one of three appointed by Pennewill to be delegates at the Fourth International Conference on State & Local Taxation held in Milwaukee, Wisconsin. Cahall announced in December 1911 that he was running for the United States House of Representatives to succeed William H. Heald. He ultimately endorsed George H. Hall for the position. He was again considered a candidate for Congress in 1924 but did not win his party's nomination. Cahall continued practicing law until his death in 1937; by that time, he was the oldest member of the Sussex County bar in age and had the third-longest length of service.

== Personal life ==
Cahall married Elanora Richardson Powell, of Onancock, Virginia, in April 1900. They had no children. He was a freemason and member of several masonic groups; he was a High Priest of the local chapter of the Royal Arch Masons and was a member of the Grand Lodge of Delaware, for which he served several roles, including as a warden, a member of its foreign correspondence committee, and its Grand Master. He also was a member of Hope Chapter No. 7, Lulu Temple, St. John's Commandery No. 1, and the Frank in Lodge in Georgetown.

In 1893, Cahall assisted in establishing the Sussex Trust Company and later directed the bank. At various points he had positions as director of the Farmers Bank, founding member of the Wilmington Continental American Life Insurance Company, officer of the Georgetown Junior Order of United American Mechanics, third vice president of the Delaware Automobile Association, and member of the Sussex County School Commission. He was one of three civic delegates from his county to the Pan-American Exposition in 1901 and worked with former Delaware Supreme Court justice and historian Henry C. Conrad at the Institute of Social and Religious Research in 1924.

Cahall died on June 28, 1937, at the age of 77 at his home in Georgetown. The Journal-Every Evening described his life: "The death of Joseph L. Cahall of Georgetown removes from the scene of activity an estimable citizen of Delaware who had devoted his long life to worth while pursuits. Mr. Cahall was a lawyer of marked ability. He had a keen mind, and his judgment was excellent. He was interested in the well being of his state and its people ... He was an ardent member of the Republican party, and was a factor in the part it played in the public affairs of his native Sussex County, as well as the state. He seldom sought political preferment. He seemed to be more interested in creditable results from political efforts wisely directed. Mr. Cahall also interested himself in the civic affairs of his immediate community. He was a helpful influence in furthering worth while projects for the public good, and was esteemed by all who knew him."
