= Carolyn Bunny Welsh =

American politician

Carolyn "Bunny" Welsh

Sheriff of Chester County
- In office January 4, 2000 – January 1, 2020
- Succeeded by: Fredda Maddox

Personal details
- Born: November 28, 1943 (age 82) Chadds Ford, Pennsylvania
- Party: Republican
- Nickname: Bunny

Carolyn "Bunny" Welsh is the former sheriff of Chester County, Pennsylvania, serving from 2000 to 2020. She was the county's first female sheriff as well as both the vice president of the National Sheriffs Association and president of the Pennsylvania Sheriffs' Association. She was inducted into the International Police Hall of Fame and received numerous awards during her years of service. She served on the national advisory board of Women for Trump and was co chairman of America's Sheriffs for Trump.

Welsh was charged for allowing her subordinates to unlawfully receive compensation time during fund-raisers. She pleaded no-contest to the charges and agreed to pay restitution so her deputies would not have to pay. Her subordinate Harry McKinney also pleaded no-contest for using about $4,000 from his 3 dog K9 unit to pay for care of his retired K9 partner..

Welsh attended Wesley College and the Wharton School of the University of Pennsylvania.

Law Enforcement Positions
Preceded by Robert Erling	Chester County Sheriff; 2000-2020	Succeeded by Fredda Maddox
