= T. Coleman du Pont =

American engineer and politician (1863–1930)

Thomas Coleman du Pont
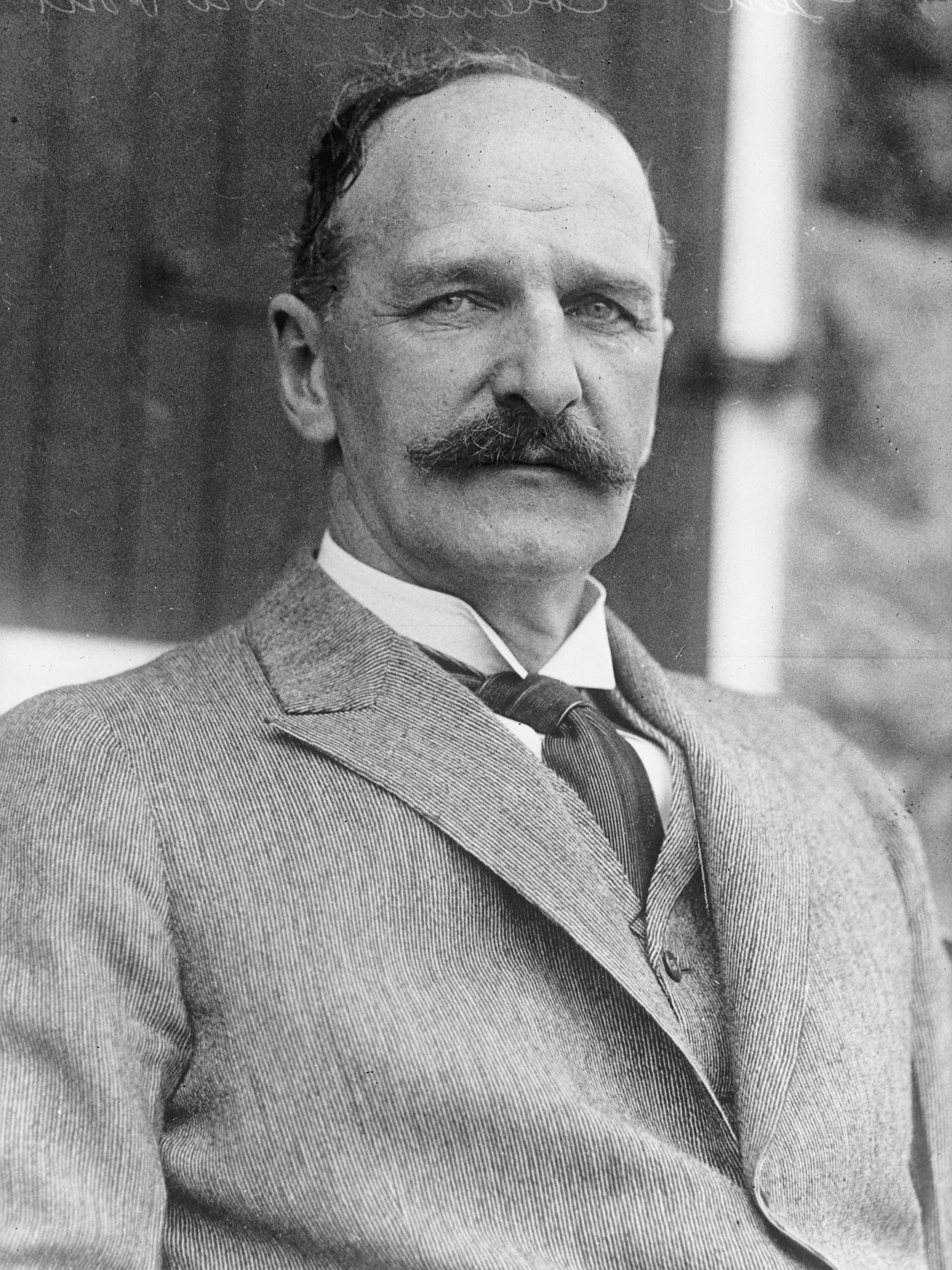
- Du Pont c. 1910–1920

United States Senator from Delaware
- In office March 4, 1925 – December 9, 1928
- Preceded by: L. Heisler Ball
- Succeeded by: Daniel O. Hastings
- In office July 7, 1921 – November 7, 1922
- Appointed by: William D. Denney
- Preceded by: Josiah O. Wolcott
- Succeeded by: Thomas F. Bayard, Jr.

Personal details
- Born: December 11, 1863 Louisville, Kentucky, U.S.
- Died: November 11, 1930 (aged 66) Wilmington, Delaware, U.S.
- Party: Republican
- Spouse: Alice Elsie du Pont
- Children: Francis Victor DuPont, Alice Hounsfield du Pont Wilson Buck, Ellen Coleman du Pont Meeds Wheelwright, Rene de Pelleport du Pont Donaldson, Eleuthere Irenee du Pont
- Education: Massachusetts Institute of Technology
- Occupation: Engineer, corporate executive

Thomas Coleman du Pont (December 11, 1863 – November 11, 1930) was an American engineer and politician from Greenville, Delaware. He was President of E. I. du Pont de Nemours and Company, and a member of the Republican Party who served parts of two terms as United States Senator from Delaware.

== Early life and family ==
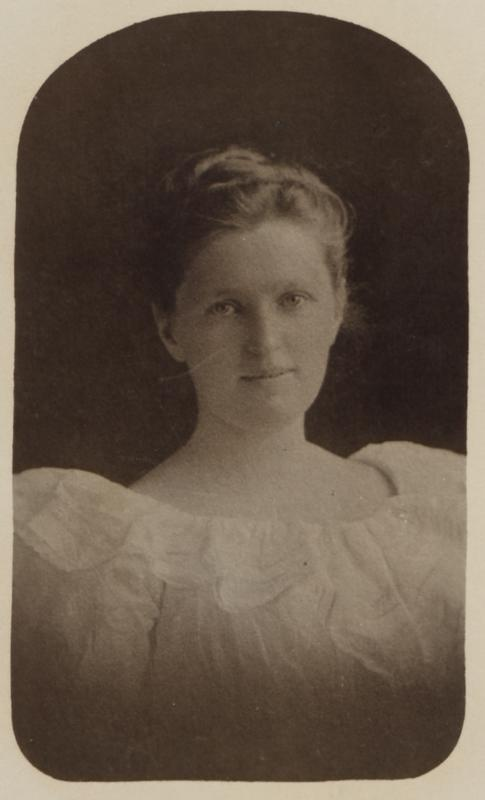
Alice Elsie du Pont

Du Pont was born at Louisville, Kentucky. He was a cousin of U.S. Senator Henry A. du Pont and great-grandson of Eleuthère Irénée du Pont, the founder of E. I. du Pont de Nemours and Company. Du Pont attended preparatory school at Urbana University and earned an engineering degree at the Massachusetts Institute of Technology. While at MIT, he was initiated into the Sigma Chi fraternity.

He married a cousin, Alice Elsie du Pont (granddaughter of Charles I. du Pont), and in 1891 they had a daughter, Alice Hounsfield du Pont. In 1921, the younger Alice married Clayton Douglass Buck, future U.S. Senator and two-term governor of Delaware. She inherited her father's family home, Buena Vista, and in 1965 the Bucks sold it to the State of Delaware for $1. The state now operates it as the Buena Vista Conference Center. It was added to the National Register of Historic Places in 1971.

== Business career ==
Du Pont started his career in the family's coal mines, the Central Coal and Iron Company, and soon pursued opportunities in street railways. In 1894, he began working as the general manager of the Johnson Street Rail Company in Johnstown, Pennsylvania.

With his cousins, Alfred I. du Pont and Pierre S. du Pont, T. Coleman du Pont bought out the family's explosives business in Delaware. He was president from 1902 until 1915, during which time he oversaw the acquisitions of more than one hundred competitors. He was a key player in the formation of the holding company, E. I. du Pont de Nemours Company of New Jersey. In 1907, the DuPont Company was sued for antitrust violations; he sold off his stake of the business in 1914.

T. Coleman du Pont had control of the Hotel McAlpin, Claridge Atlantic City, Wallick's, and other American hotels. Together with Lucius M. Boomer, president of Boomer-du Pont Properties Corporation and husband of Jørgine Boomer, du Pont owned a number of other hotels. In 1918, they purchased the Waldorf-Astoria Hotel in New York City, then in 1920 the Willard Hotel in Washington, D.C., and in 1925 the company purchased The Bellevue-Stratford Hotel in Philadelphia from the heirs of the founder, George C. Boldt.

In 1915, du Pont acquired control of The Equitable Life Assurance Society from J. P. Morgan and was responsible for the building of the Equitable Life Building in New York City, once the largest building in the city.

== DuPont Highway ==
In 1908, du Pont proposed a modern road that was to run the length of Delaware from Selbyville north to Wilmington as part of a philanthropic measure. This roadway was planned to improve travel and bring economic development to Kent and Sussex counties. The DuPont Highway was to be modeled after the great boulevards of Europe and was to have a 200-foot (61 m) wide right-of-way consisting of a 40-foot (12 m) wide roadway for automobiles flanked by dual trolley lines, 30-foot (9.1 m) wide roadways for heavy vehicles, 15-foot (4.6 m) wide unpaved roadways for horses, and sidewalks. Utilities were to be buried underground below the horse roadways. The highway was also to include agricultural experimental stations and monuments for future surveying. Trolley revenues would help pay for the construction of the roadway.

After portions of the DuPont Highway were built, these portions were planned to be turned over to the state at no charge. The Coleman DuPont Road, Inc. was established in 1911 and construction of the DuPont Highway began. The DuPont Highway would end up being built as a two-lane concrete road on a 60-foot (18 m) alignment with a 32-foot (9.8 m) wide roadway.

The Delaware State Highway Department took over construction and the DuPont Highway was completed in 1923 when the final section near Odessa was finished. The DuPont Highway was a boon to southern Delaware, which had formerly been economically isolated from the large cities of the northeast. In conjunction with the rise of the automobile, the highway spurred the growth of the Delaware beaches by greatly improving access to the coast for tourists from northern Delaware and adjacent portions of the Northeast megalopolis. Southern Delaware also developed into a major truck farming region due to having much greater access to urban markets. No longer fully reliant on the railroads to transport their goods, farmers in Sussex and Kent counties could market their fruits, vegetables, and broiler chickens directly to consumers in the north.

The DuPont Highway became US 113 between Selbyville and Dover and US 13 between Dover and Wilmington.

== Political career ==
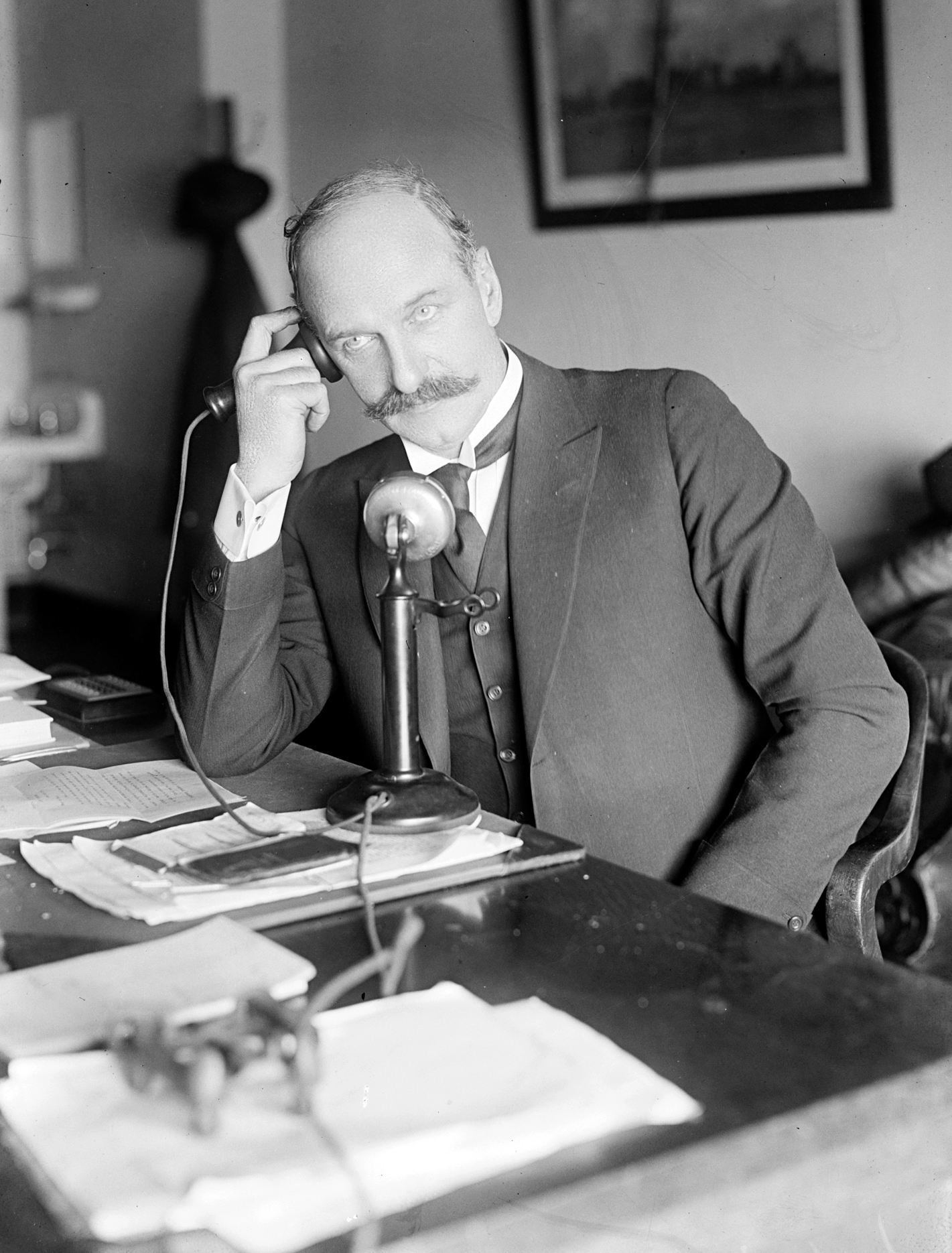
Coleman du Pont in his Senate office

Du Pont retired from business activities in 1915 and became involved in Republican Party politics, as a member of the Republican National Committee from 1908 until 1930. It was largely under his leadership that the Union Republicans and Regular Republicans came back together and built the modern Delaware Republican Party.

Du Pont was appointed to the U.S. Senate on July 7, 1921, to fill the vacancy caused by the resignation of U.S. Senator Josiah O. Wolcott. During this term, he served with the Republican majority in the 67th Congress. However, he lost his bid to complete the term in a special election on November 7, 1922. On the same day he also lost his bid for the full term to follow, in both instances losing to Democrat Thomas F. Bayard, Jr., a Wilmington lawyer who was married to one of du Pont's cousins.

Du Pont was elected to the U.S. Senate in 1924, defeating the incumbent Republican U.S. Senator L. Heisler Ball for the nomination, and going on to defeat Democrat James M. Tunnell, a Georgetown, Delaware lawyer. During this term, he served with the Republican majority in the 69th and 70th Congress, until health problems caused him to resign.

In all, du Pont served two separate terms, one from July 7, 1921, until November 21, 1922, during the administration of U.S. President Warren G. Harding, and the other from March 4, 1925, until December 9, 1928, during the administration of U.S. President Calvin Coolidge. In 1927, he introduced a bill proposing the construction of "a coast-to-coast superhighway, five hundred feet wide, as direct as possible from the Atlantic to the Pacific coast". However, this proposed superhighway never came to be, due in part to the economic pressures of the Great Depression. The later years of his life were marked by his implication in the Teapot Dome scandal, and by lawsuits over various Florida real estate deals. In 1922, du Pont and his wife donated property on the Chesapeake Bay in Maryland to the Del-Mar-Va Council of the Boy Scouts of America for development of what is now known as Camp Rodney.

== Death ==
Du Pont suffered from cancer of the larynx and died at Buena Vista. He is buried in the Du Pont de Nemours Cemetery in Greenville, Delaware.

== Almanac ==
Elections are held the first Tuesday after November 1. U.S. Senators are popularly elected and took office March 4 for a six-year term.

Election results
Year	Office	Subject	Party	Votes	%	Opponent	Party	Votes	%
1922 (Special)	U.S. Senator	T. Coleman du Pont	Republican	36,894	49.6%	Thomas F. Bayard, Jr.	Democratic	√ 36,954	√ 49.7%
1922	U.S. Senator	T. Coleman du Pont	Republican	36,979	49.4%	Thomas F. Bayard, Jr.	Democratic	√ 37,304	√ 49.8%
1924	U.S. Senator	T. Coleman du Pont	Republican	√ 52,731	√ 59%	James M. Tunnell	Democratic	36,085	41%

United States Congressional service
Dates	Congress	Chamber	Majority	Committees	Class/District	Notes
July 7, 1921 – November 7, 1922	67th	U.S. Senate	Republican		class 1	Appointed, but lost both the special election to finish the term and the general election for the next term.
March 4, 1925 – March 3, 1927	69th	U.S. Senate	Republican		class 2	
March 4, 1927 – March 3, 1929	70th	U.S. Senate	Republican		class 2	

== Work cited ==
- John Milner Associates, Inc. (July 2005). Historic Context for the DuPont Highway U.S. Route 113: Kent and Sussex County, Delaware (PDF). in association with Whitman, Requardt, Inc. and Rummel, Klepper & Kahl, LLP. Dover, DE: Delaware Department of Transportation.

Party political offices
Preceded by Henry A. du Pont	Republican nominee for U.S. Senator from Delaware (Class 1); 1922	Succeeded by John G. Townsend Jr.
Preceded by L. Heisler Ball	Republican nominee for U.S. Senator from Delaware (Class 2); 1924	Succeeded by Daniel O. Hastings
U.S. Senate
Preceded by L. Heisler Ball	U.S. Senator (Class 2) from Delaware; 1925-1928; Served alongside: Thomas F. Bayard, Jr.	Succeeded by Daniel O. Hastings
Preceded by Josiah O. Wolcott	U.S. Senator (Class 1) from Delaware; 1921-1922; Served alongside: L. Heisler Ball	Succeeded by Thomas F. Bayard, Jr.
