= Central Coal and Iron Company =

Mining company

The Central Coal and Iron Company was a 19th-century coal company in the western Kentucky coalfields.

== Management ==
It was managed by the Louisville branch of the Du Pont family, including Alfred V. du Pont's youngest son Bidermann and his son T. Coleman du Pont.

It was the namesake of the town of Central City, Kentucky, in Muhlenberg County.
