= William N. Johnston =

American college president

William N. Johnston became the 16th president of Wesley College (Delaware) in June 2008 and retired in July 2015. Previous to this post Johnston served as the 27th president of Iowa Wesleyan College for six years, and as a lower level administrator at Bethany College in Bethany, West Virginia, Davis & Elkins College in West Virginia, West Virginia Wesleyan College, and Ashland University in Ohio.

Dr. Johnston earned a bachelor of arts degree in psychology from Westminster College (where he became a member of Phi Kappa Tau fraternity) in 1972, a master of arts degree in college student personnel from Bowling Green State University in 1973, and a doctor of education degree in higher education from West Virginia University in 1986. He also studied at Harvard University in 1999 at the Institute for Educational Management (IEM).
