= James M. Tunnell =

American politician (1879–1957)

James Tunnell
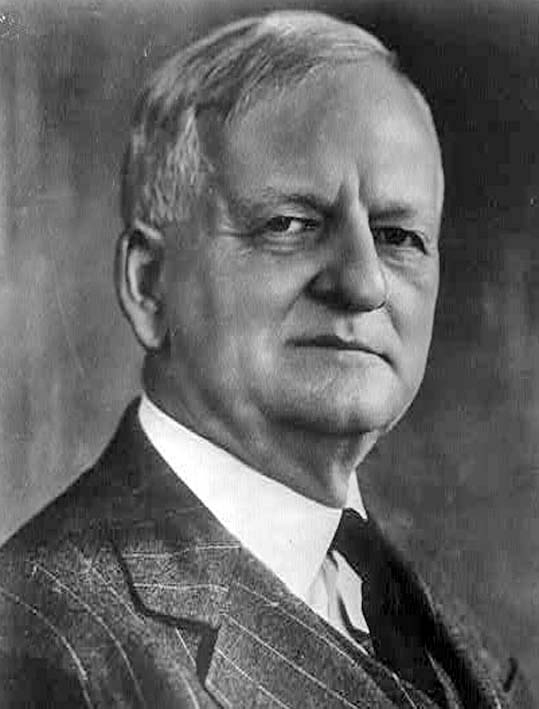

United States Senator from Delaware
- In office January 3, 1941 – January 3, 1947
- Preceded by: John G. Townsend Jr.
- Succeeded by: John J. Williams

Personal details
- Born: August 2, 1879 Clarksville, Delaware, U.S.
- Died: November 14, 1957 (aged 78) Philadelphia, Pennsylvania, U.S.
- Party: Democratic
- Spouse: Sarah Ethel Dukes
- Education: Franklin College
- Occupation: Educator, banker
- Profession: Lawyer, teacher

James Miller Tunnell (August 2, 1879 – November 14, 1957) was an American lawyer and politician from Georgetown, in Sussex County, Delaware. He was a member of the Democratic Party, and served as U.S. Senator from Delaware.

== Early life and family ==
Tunnell was born in Clarksville, near Millville, Delaware. He attended the public schools and graduated in 1900 from Franklin College, now combined with Muskingum College in New Concord, Ohio.

== Professional and political career ==
Tunnell taught in the public schools, eventually becoming principal of the schools at Frankford, Selbyville and Ocean View in Delaware. Meanwhile, he studied the law, was admitted to the bar in 1907 and began a practice in Georgetown. He was president of the Georgetown Board of Education from 1919 until 1932. Tunnell was also a banker and owned and operated a number of farms in Sussex County.

Tunnell first ran for a seat in the United States Senate in 1924, but was defeated by Republican T. Coleman du Pont. He was elected to the United States Senate in 1940, this time defeating the incumbent Republican Senator John G. Townsend Jr. During this term, he served with the Democratic majority in the 77th, 78th, and 79th congresses. He was chairman of the Committee on Pensions in the 78th and 79th congresses. Tunnell lost his bid for a second term in 1946 to Republican John J. Williams from Millsboro, Delaware. He served from January 3, 1941, to January 3, 1947, during the administrations of U.S. presidents Franklin D. Roosevelt and Harry S. Truman. Director of the Farmers' Bank of Delaware (1905–1957) Tunnell was an early supporter of the Equal Rights Amendment.

== Death and legacy ==
James M. Tunnell died age 78 on November 14, 1957, in Philadelphia, Pennsylvania. He is buried in the Blackwater Church Cemetery, near Clarksville, Sussex County, Delaware. His son James M. Tunnell Jr. was the Democratic nominee for the class 2 senate seat in 1966, but lost to incumbent J. Caleb Boggs.

== Almanac ==
Elections are held the first Tuesday after November 1. U.S. Senators are popularly elected and take office January 3 for a six-year term.

Public offices
Office	Type	Location	Began office	Ended office	Notes
U.S. Senator	Legislature	Washington	January 3, 1941	January 3, 1947	

United States Congress service
Dates	Congress	Chamber	Majority	President	Committees	Class/District
1941–1943	77th	U.S. Senate	Democratic	Franklin D. Roosevelt		class 1
1943–1945	78th	U.S. Senate	Democratic	Franklin D. Roosevelt		class 1
1945–1947	79th	U.S. Senate	Democratic	Franklin D. Roosevelt; Harry S. Truman		class 1

Election results
Year	Office	Subject	Party	Votes	%	Opponent	Party	Votes	%
1924	U.S. Senator	James M. Tunnell	Democratic	36,085	41%	T. Coleman du Pont	Republican	52,731	59%
1940	U.S. Senator	James M. Tunnell	Democratic	68,294	51%	John G. Townsend Jr.	Republican	63,799	47%
1946	U.S. Senator	James M. Tunnell	Democratic	50,910	45%	John J. Williams	Republican	62,603	55%

Party political offices
Preceded by Willard Saulsbury Jr.	Democratic Party nominee for United States Senator (class 2) from Delaware; 1924	Succeeded by Thomas F. Bayard Jr.
Preceded by Wilbur L. Adams	Democratic Party nominee for United States Senator (class 1) from Delaware; 1940, 1946	Succeeded by Alexis I. du Pont Bayard
U.S. Senate
Preceded by John G. Townsend Jr.	U.S. Senator (Class 1) from Delaware; 1941–1947; Served alongside: James H. Hughes, C. Douglass Buck	Succeeded by John J. Williams
