= 1916 Delaware gubernatorial election =

- November 7, 1916
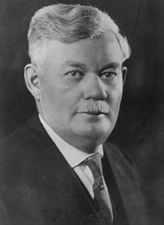

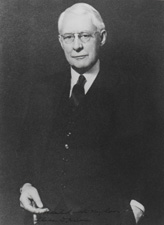
Nominee	John G. Townsend Jr.	James H. Hughes
Party	Republican	Democratic
Popular vote	26,673	24,053
Percentage	52.08%	46.96%
- County results Townsend: 50–60% Hughes: 50–60%
Governor before election
Charles R. Miller
Republican
Elected Governor
John G. Townsend Jr.
Republican

The 1916 Delaware gubernatorial election was held on November 7, 1916. Incumbent Republican Governor Charles R. Miller declined to run for re-election. At the time, the Republican Party was in the middle of a schism that had first developed during the 1912 presidential election. However, the schism did not affect the gubernatorial nomination; though there were rumors that the state party convention might seek to nominate Governor Miller for a second term, former State Representative John G. Townsend Jr. was seen as the frontrunner heading into the convention. He received the nomination without much difficulty and the Republican Party solidified around him its gubernatorial nominee. The Democratic Party nominated former Secretary of State James H. Hughes, and both Townsend and Hughes advanced to the general election.

Though President Woodrow Wilson had won Delaware in 1912 with a plurality, he narrowly lost it this year. Though the gubernatorial race was still close, Townsend outperformed Republican presidential nominee Charles Evans Hughes and defeated Hughes by a five-point margin, winning 52% of the vote to Hughes's 47%.

Both Townsend and Hughes would later serve in the United States Senate, and they would serve together as Delaware's two U.S. Senators from 1937 to 1941. Townsend served from 1929 to 1941, while Hughes served from 1937 to 1943.

== General election ==
1916 Delaware gubernatorial election
Party	Candidate	Votes	%	±%
Republican	John G. Townsend Jr.	26,673	52.08%	+5.13%
Democratic	James H. Hughes	24,053	46.96%	+2.66%
Socialist	Frank A. Houck	490	0.96%	−0.19%
Majority		2,620	5.12%	+2.46%
Turnout		51,216	100.00%	
Republican hold				

== Bibliography ==
- Delaware House Journal, 96th General Assembly, 1st Reg. Sess. (1917).
