= Bayard, West Virginia =

- Town
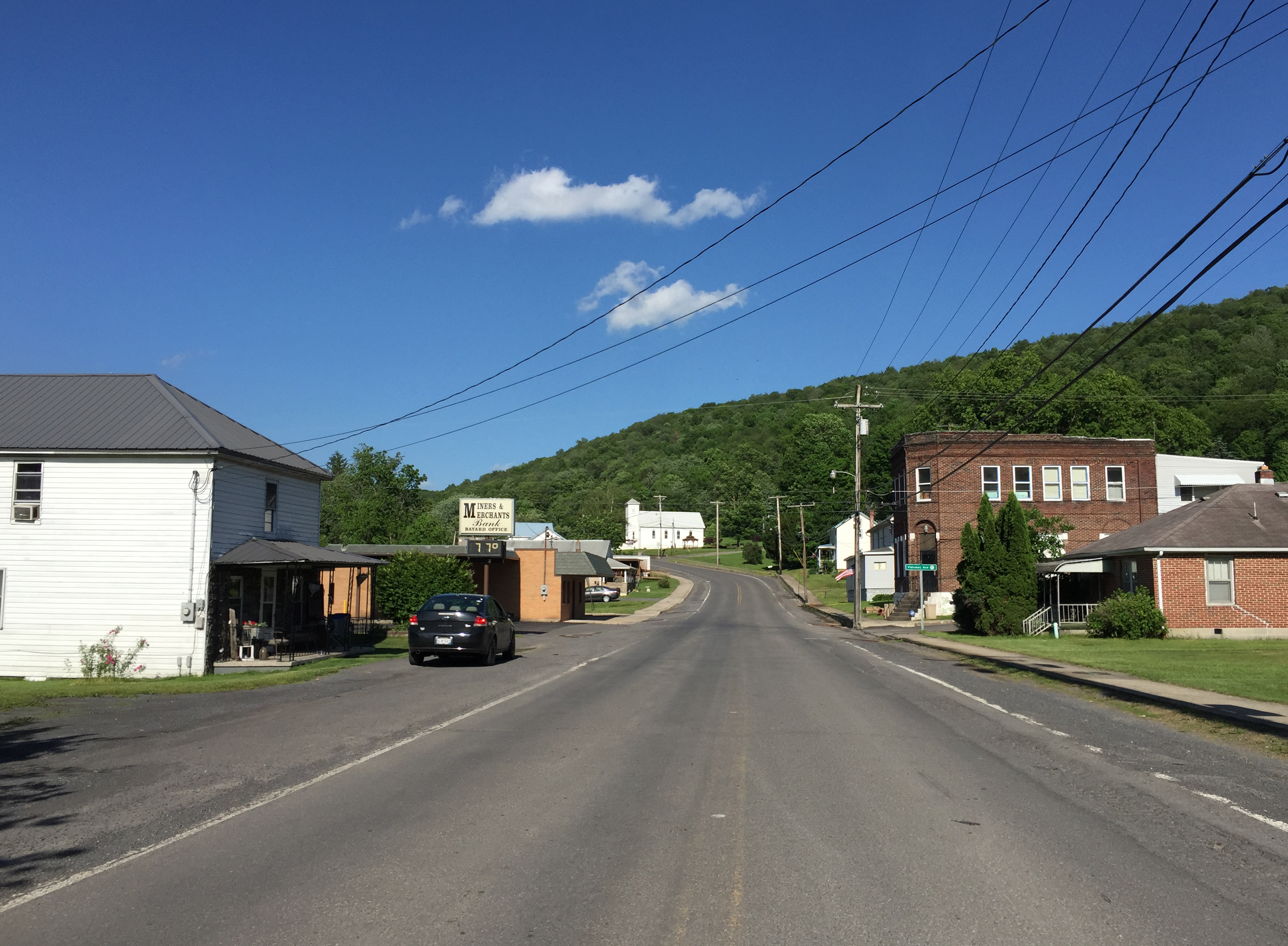
- Front Street in Bayard

- Location of Bayard in Grant County, West Virginia.

- Location in West Virginia Bayard (the United States) Bayard (North America)
- Coordinates: 39°16′16″N 79°21′58″W
- Country: United States
- State: West Virginia
- County: Grant

Area
  - Total: 0.31 sq mi (0.80 km^{2})
  - Land: 0.31 sq mi (0.80 km^{2})
  - Water: 0 sq mi (0.00 km^{2})
- Elevation: 2,356 ft (718 m)

Population (2020)
  - Total: 201
  - Estimate (2021): 199
  - Density: 839.8/sq mi (324.24/km^{2})
- Time zone: UTC-5 (EST)
  - Summer (DST): UTC-4 (EDT)
- ZIP code: 26707
- Area code: 304
- FIPS code: 54-04924
- GNIS feature ID: 2390716

Bayard is a town in Grant County, West Virginia, United States. The population was 200 at the 2020 census.

== History ==
Bayard was incorporated in 1893 and named in honor of Thomas F. Bayard, Jr., who later became a United States senator from Delaware (1923–1929). Bayard was founded on the West Virginia Central and Pittsburg Railway as a coal mining community. Coal mining has remained the town's chief industry.

== Geography ==
According to the United States Census Bureau, the town has a total area of 0.31 square miles (0.80 km^{2}), all of it land.

=== Climate ===
The climate in this area has mild differences between highs and lows, and there is adequate rainfall year-round. According to the Köppen Climate Classification system, Bayard has a marine west coast climate, abbreviated "Cfb" on climate maps.

Climate data for Bayard, West Virginia (1991–2020 normals, extremes 1902–present)
Month	Jan	Feb	Mar	Apr	May	Jun	Jul	Aug	Sep	Oct	Nov	Dec	Year
Record high °F (°C)	73 (23)	79 (26)	84 (29)	89 (32)	92 (33)	94 (34)	95 (35)	95 (35)	95 (35)	92 (33)	78 (26)	74 (23)	95 (35)
Mean daily maximum °F (°C)	35.0 (1.7)	38.2 (3.4)	46.5 (8.1)	59.0 (15.0)	68.1 (20.1)	75.6 (24.2)	79.2 (26.2)	78.0 (25.6)	71.7 (22.1)	60.9 (16.1)	48.6 (9.2)	39.1 (3.9)	58.3 (14.6)
Daily mean °F (°C)	25.5 (−3.6)	28.2 (−2.1)	35.5 (1.9)	46.1 (7.8)	55.6 (13.1)	63.4 (17.4)	67.3 (19.6)	65.9 (18.8)	59.3 (15.2)	48.6 (9.2)	37.8 (3.2)	30.0 (−1.1)	46.9 (8.3)
Mean daily minimum °F (°C)	16.1 (−8.8)	18.2 (−7.7)	24.4 (−4.2)	33.3 (0.7)	43.1 (6.2)	51.2 (10.7)	55.4 (13.0)	53.9 (12.2)	46.8 (8.2)	36.2 (2.3)	27.0 (−2.8)	20.9 (−6.2)	35.5 (1.9)
Record low °F (°C)	−30 (−34)	−25 (−32)	−17 (−27)	1 (−17)	13 (−11)	27 (−3)	32 (0)	28 (−2)	15 (−9)	8 (−13)	−14 (−26)	−20 (−29)	−30 (−34)
Average precipitation inches (mm)	4.27 (108)	4.11 (104)	4.53 (115)	4.50 (114)	5.39 (137)	5.25 (133)	5.55 (141)	4.19 (106)	3.93 (100)	3.38 (86)	3.33 (85)	4.25 (108)	52.68 (1,338)
Average snowfall inches (cm)	31.9 (81)	30.1 (76)	19.6 (50)	4.4 (11)	0.0 (0.0)	0.0 (0.0)	0.0 (0.0)	0.0 (0.0)	0.0 (0.0)	2.0 (5.1)	7.5 (19)	22.3 (57)	117.8 (299)
Average precipitation days (≥ 0.01 in)	20.9	18.2	17.3	16.0	16.5	14.3	13.2	12.9	11.1	12.6	13.6	18.6	185.2
Average snowy days (≥ 0.1 in)	12.9	11.0	7.6	2.0	0.0	0.0	0.0	0.0	0.0	0.8	3.4	9.5	47.2
Source: NOAA

== Transportation ==
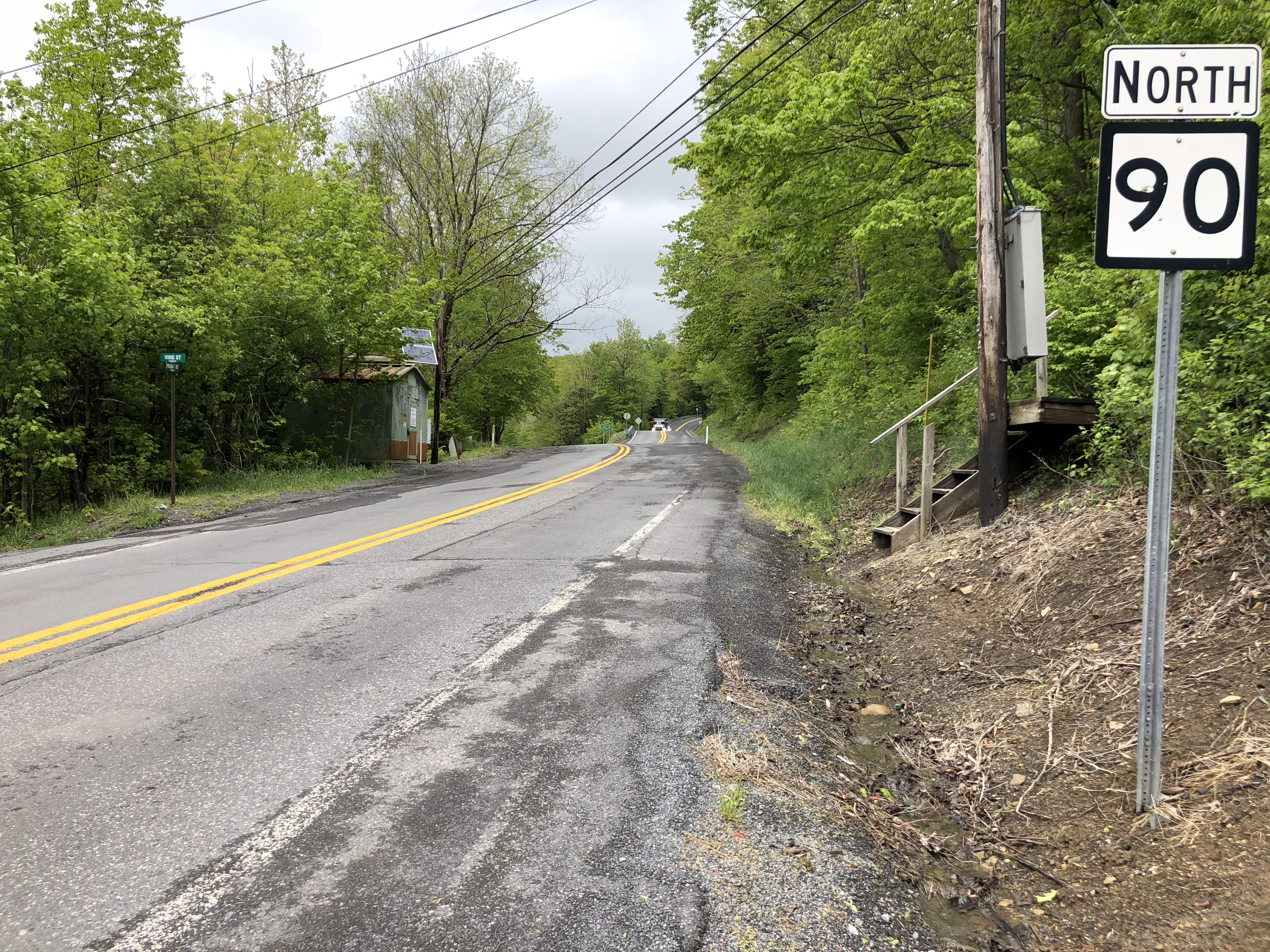
Route 90 northbound leaving Bayard

The only significant road serving Bayard is West Virginia Route 90. Route 90 connects Bayard to U.S. Route 219 to the southwest, and U.S. Route 50 to the northeast. Within Bayard, Route 90 follows Front Street through the center of town.

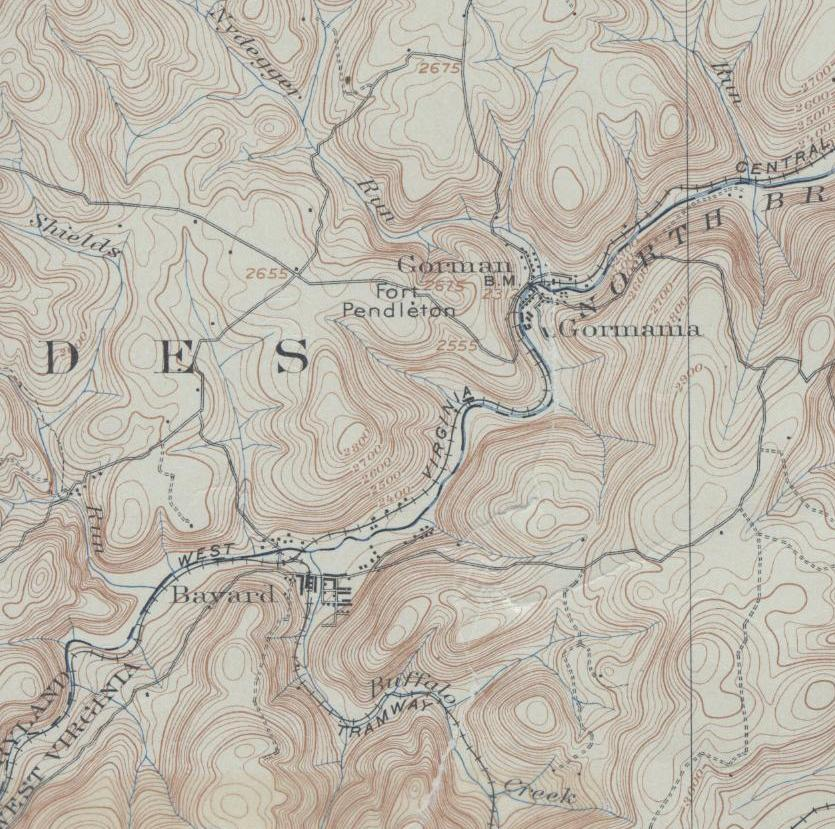
The towns of Bayard, Gorman, and Gormania on a 1900 USGS topographical map.

== Demographics ==
Historical population
Census	Pop.	Note	%±
1900	540		—
1910	417		−22.8%
1920	1,074		157.6%
1930	743		−30.8%
1940	585		−21.3%
1950	589		0.7%
1960	484		−17.8%
1970	475		−1.9%
1980	540		13.7%
1990	414		−23.3%
2000	299		−27.8%
2010	290		−3.0%
2020	201		−30.7%
2021 (est.)	199	▼	−1.0%
U.S. Decennial Census

=== 2010 census ===
At the 2010 census there were 290 people, 126 households, and 86 families living in the town. The population density was 935.5 inhabitants per square mile (361.2/km^{2}). There were 151 housing units at an average density of 487.1 per square mile (188.1/km^{2}). The racial makeup of the town was 98.3% White, 1.4% Native American, and 0.3% from two or more races. Hispanic or Latino of any race were 0.3%. Black people accounted for 0.0% of the population.

Of the 126 households 28.6% had children under the age of 18 living with them, 56.3% were married couples living together, 6.3% had a female householder with no husband present, 5.6% had a male householder with no wife present, and 31.7% were non-families. 27.8% of households were one person and 8.8% were one person aged 65 or older. The average household size was 2.30 and the average family size was 2.80.

The median age in the town was 44.5 years. 19.3% of residents were under the age of 18; 5.6% were between the ages of 18 and 24; 26.5% were from 25 to 44; 29.3% were from 45 to 64; and 19.3% were 65 or older. The gender makeup of the town was 52.4% male and 47.6% female.

=== 2000 census ===
At the 2000 census there were 299 people, 141 households, and 93 families living in the town. The population density was 949.2 inhabitants per square mile (366.5/km^{2}). There were 172 housing units at an average density of 546.0 per square mile (210.8/km^{2}). The racial makeup of the town was 96.66% White, 0.67% African American, 2.01% Native American, and 0.67% from two or more races. Hispanic or Latino of any race were 0.67%.

Of the 141 households 21.3% had children under the age of 18 living with them, 50.4% were married couples living together, 9.9% had a female householder with no husband present, and 34.0% were non-families. 29.8% of households were one person and 18.4% were one person aged 65 or older. The average household size was 2.12 and the average family size was 2.60.

The age distribution was 16.4% under the age of 18, 9.4% from 18 to 24, 21.7% from 25 to 44, 32.1% from 45 to 64, and 20.4% 65 or older. The median age was 46 years. For every 100 females, there were 104.8 males. For every 100 females age 18 and over, there were 101.6 males.

The median household income was $25,156 and the median family income was $31,750. Males had a median income of $30,313 versus $14,583 for females. The per capita income for the town was $13,882. About 7.2% of families and 14.3% of the population were below the poverty line, including 22.5% of those under the age of eighteen and 5.3% of those sixty five or over.
