= John Palermo =

American football player and coach (born 1952)

Biographical details
- Born: March 26, 1952 (age 74)

Playing career
- 1971–1972: Wesley
- 1972–1973: Florida State

Coaching career (HC unless noted)
- 1974–1976: Bainbridge HS (GA)
- 1977–1978: NC State (assistant)
- 1979: Austin Peay (DL)
- 1980–1982: Memphis State (DL)
- 1983: Appalachian State (AHC/DL/LB)
- 1984–1987: Minnesota (DL)
- 1988–1989: Notre Dame (DL)
- 1990: Austin Peay
- 1991–1995: Wisconsin (AHC/OLB)
- 1996–2005: Wisconsin (AHC/DL)
- 2006: Miami (FL) (DL)
- 2007: Tennessee Tech (DC/LB)
- 2008–2009: Washington Redskins (DL)
- 2010–2011: Middle Tennessee (DL)
- 2012: Tennessee (DL)
- 2013–2014: Pittsburgh (LB/DE)
- 2015–2016: Ave Maria (AHC/DL)

Head coaching record
- Overall: 0–11

John Palermo (born March 26, 1952) is an American football coach and former player. He attended Newburgh Free Academy in Newburgh, New York, began his college football career at Wesley College in Delaware before transferring to Florida State. He served as the head football coach at Austin Peay State University in 1990, compiling a record of 0–11.

== Head coaching record ==
Year	Team	Overall	Conference	Standing	Bowl/playoffs
Austin Peay Governors (Ohio Valley Conference) (1990)
1990	Austin Peay	0–11	0–6	7th	
Austin Peay:		0–11	0–6		
Total:		0–11			
