= John J. McKetta =

American chemical engineer (1915–2019)

- Born: October 17, 1915; Wyano, Pennsylvania
- Died: January 15, 2019 (aged 103)
- Education: Trine University; University of Michigan
- Occupations: Chemical engineer, professor

John J. McKetta Jr. (October 17, 1915 – January 15, 2019) was an American chemical engineer known for his research on more efficient ways to create energy and the thermodynamic properties of hydrocarbons.

== Life ==
Born in Wyano, Pennsylvania to Ukrainian immigrant parents, he initially worked as a coal miner. He obtained his BSE from Tri-State College (now Trine University) in Angola, Indiana, and, MS and PhD degrees from the University of Michigan. He joined the faculty of the chemical engineering department of the University of Texas in 1946, later serving as department chair, dean of the UT College of Engineering, and vice chancellor of the UT System. He served as energy advisor to Presidents Richard Nixon, Gerald Ford, Ronald Reagan, and George H. W. Bush.

He published over 400 papers and wrote or edited 87 books, including the 68-volume "Encyclopedia of Chemical Processing and Design". He was elected to the National Academy of Engineering and, in 2009, was selected by the American Institute of Chemical Engineers as one of the "50 Chemical Engineers of the Foundation Age." He also served as president of AIChE in 1962.

In 1997, Trine University named its department of chemical engineering in his honor and in 2016 Trine named him "Patron Saint of the Faculty" in honor of his dedication to his alma mater.

In 2012, the University of Texas renamed his department as the John J. McKetta Jr. Department of Chemical Engineering. As a published author, he is widely held in libraries worldwide. He died in January 2019, aged 103.
