= Wilbur L. Adams =

American lawyer and politician (1884–1937)

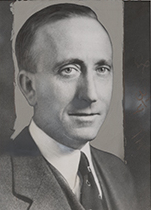

Member of the U.S. House of Representatives from Delaware's at-large district
- In office March 4, 1933 – January 3, 1935
- Preceded by: Robert G. Houston
- Succeeded by: J. George Stewart

Personal details
- Born: Wilbur Louis Adams; October 23, 1884 Georgetown, Delaware, U.S.
- Died: December 4, 1937 (aged 53) Lewes, Delaware, U.S.
- Resting place: Union Cemetery at South Race Street, Georgetown
- Party: Democratic
- Education: Dickinson College; University of Pennsylvania School of Law
- Profession: Lawyer

Wilbur Louis Adams (October 23, 1884 – December 4, 1937) was an American lawyer and politician from Wilmington, in New Castle County, Delaware. He was a member of the Democratic Party, who served one term as U.S. Representative from Delaware from 1933 to 1935.

== Early life ==
Adams was born in Georgetown, Delaware, son of William Dunning Adams and Sarah Lavinia (Thompson) Adams.

=== Education ===
He had attended Delaware College in Newark and Dickinson College in Carlisle, Pennsylvania. In 1907 he graduated from the University of Pennsylvania School of Law at Philadelphia, was admitted to the Delaware Bar, and began the practice of law in Wilmington.

== Political career ==
Adams was an unsuccessful candidate for election as state Attorney General in 1924.

=== Congress ===
In 1932, the incumbent Republican U.S. Representative, Robert G. Houston, was involved in an intra-party dispute over prohibition and failed to win the Republican nomination. As a result, Adams was able to win a narrow victory, and was elected to the U.S. House of Representatives in 1932, defeating Republican Reuben Satterthwaite Jr. Adams served with the Democratic majority in the 73rd Congress. In the U.S. House, Adams voted with the straight New Deal program. He served from March 4, 1933, until January 3, 1935, during the administration of U.S. President Franklin D. Roosevelt.

=== Senate race ===
In 1934, Adams decided not to seek reelection, but rather to challenge the popular incumbent U.S. Senator John G. Townsend Jr. for his U.S. Senate seat. A thoughtful moderate Republican, Townsend had supported much of the New Deal legislation, and had demonstrated considerable effectiveness through his involvement in the establishment of such things as the Federal Deposit Insurance Corporation. By contrast, Adams had a low profile in the House of Representatives and Townsend was able to raise questions about Adams' effectiveness for Delaware.

Once again bucking national trends, Delaware had its own local Republican landslide in 1934, led by Townsend.

=== Later career ===
Adams came home and moved to Georgetown, Delaware, where he continued the practice of law. He was also the acting Postmaster at Georgetown from May 6, 1937, until his death.

== Death and legacy ==
Adams died at the Beebe Hospital, Lewes, Delaware. He is buried in the Union Cemetery, located at South Race Street, Georgetown.

== Almanac ==
Elections are held the first Tuesday after November 1. U.S. Representatives took office March 4 and have a two-year term. Since 1935 all Congressional terms began January 3.

Public offices
Office	Type	Location	Began office	Ended office	Notes
U.S. Representative	Legislature	Washington	March 4, 1933	January 3, 1935	

United States Congressional service
Dates	Congress	Chamber	Majority	President	Committee	Class/District
1933–1935	73rd	U.S. House	Democratic	Franklin D. Roosevelt		at-large

Election results
Year	Office	Subject	Party	Votes	%	Opponent	Party	Votes	%
1924	State Attorney General	Wilbur L. Adams	Democratic				Republican		
1932	U.S. Representative	Wilbur L. Adams	Democratic	51,698	46%	Reuben Satterthwaite Jr.	Republican	48,841	44%
1934	U.S. Senator	Wilbur L. Adams	Democratic	45,771	46%	John G. Townsend Jr.	Republican	52,829	53%

== Images ==
- Encyclopedia Dickinsonia

Party political offices
Preceded by Thomas F. Bayard Jr.	Democratic Party nominee for United States Senator (class 1) from Delaware; 1934	Succeeded by James M. Tunnell
U.S. House of Representatives
Preceded by Robert G. Houston	Member of the U.S. House of Representatives from Delaware's at-large congressional district 1933–1935	Succeeded by J. George Stewart
