= James H. Hughes =

American politician (1867–1953)

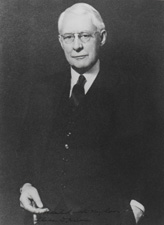

United States Senator from Delaware
- In office January 3, 1937 – January 3, 1943
- Preceded by: Daniel O. Hastings
- Succeeded by: C. Douglass Buck

Delaware Secretary of State
- In office 1897–1901
- Governor: Ebe W. Tunnell
- Preceded by: William H. Boyce
- Succeeded by: Caleb R. Layton

Personal details
- Born: James Hurd Hughes; January 14, 1867 Felton, Delaware, U.S.
- Died: August 29, 1953 (aged 86) Lewes, Delaware, U.S.
- Party: Democratic
- Spouse: Caroline Taylor
- Profession: Lawyer

James H. Hughes (January 14, 1867 – August 29, 1953) was an American lawyer and politician from Dover, in Kent County, Delaware. He was a member of the Democratic Party who served as U.S. Senator from Delaware.

== Early life and family ==
Hughes was born in Kent County, Delaware, near Felton, the son of Rebecca (Hurd) and Ebenezer Hughes. He attended the Collegiate Institute in Dover, taught school for a few years, studied law, and was admitted to the Delaware Bar in 1890. Along with his law practice, he was engaged in agricultural pursuits and banking.

== Political career ==
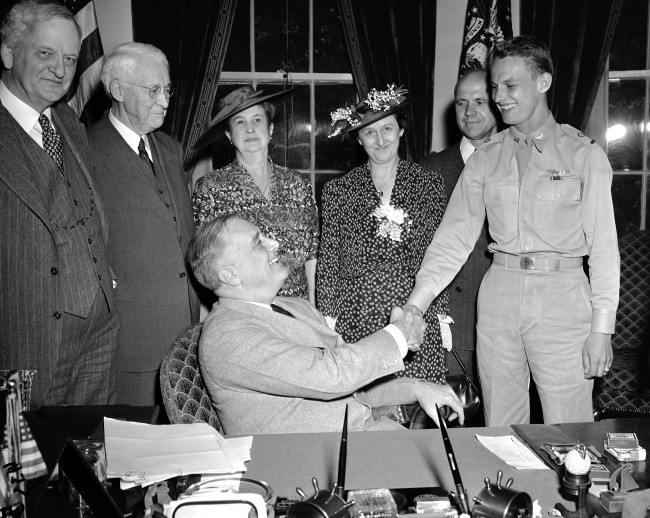
Senator James H. Hughes (D-Del.), Mrs. Hughes, Mrs. George Schwartz, mother of Welch, George Schwartz, his stepfather, and Lieutenant George Welch with F. D. R. at the White House, May 25, 1942

Hughes served as the Delaware Secretary of State from 1897 until 1901. He ran for governor of Delaware in 1916 but was defeated by Republican John G. Townsend Jr., a businessman from Selbyville, Delaware. Twenty years later, in 1936, he was elected to the U.S. Senate, defeating incumbent Republican U.S. Senator Daniel O. Hastings. During this term, he served with the Democratic majority in the 75th, 76th, and 77th congresses.

Hughes lost his bid for a second term in 1942, losing the Democratic Party nomination to E. Ennalls Berl. In all, he served from January 3, 1937, until January 2, 1943, during the administration of U.S. President Franklin D. Roosevelt. After completing his term in the Senate, he returned to the practice of law. All the while, from 1905 until his death, he was a director of the Farmers' Bank of Delaware.

== Death and legacy ==
Hughes was married to Caroline Taylor. Their great-granddaughter is actress Perrey Reeves.

Hughes died at Lewes and is buried in the Lakeside Methodist Episcopal Cemetery at Dover.

His home, Wheel of Fortune, was added to the National Register of Historic Places in 1973.

== Almanac ==
Elections are held the first Tuesday after November 1. U.S. Senators are popularly elected and take office January 3 for a six-year term.

Public offices
Office	Type	Location	Began office	Ended office	Notes
Secretary of State	Executive	Dover	1897	1901	Delaware
U.S. Senator	Legislature	Washington	January 3, 1937	January 3, 1943	class 2

United States congressional service
Dates	Congress	Chamber	Majority	President	Committees	Class/District
1937–1939	75th	U.S. Senate	Democratic	Franklin D. Roosevelt		class 2
1939–1941	76th	U.S. Senate	Democratic	Franklin D. Roosevelt		class 2
1941–1943	77th	U.S. Senate	Democratic	Franklin D. Roosevelt		class 2

Election results
Year	Office	Subject	Party	Votes	%	Opponent	Party	Votes	%
1916	Governor	James H. Hughes	Democratic	24,053	47%	John G. Townsend Jr.	Republican	26,664	52%
1936	U.S. Senate	James H. Hughes	Democratic	67,136	53%	Daniel O. Hastings	Republican	52,469	41%

== Images ==
- Biographical Directory of the United States Congress

Party political offices
Preceded by Thomas M. Monaghan	Democratic nominee for Governor of Delaware; 1916	Succeeded by Andrew J. Lynch
Preceded by Thomas F. Bayard Jr.	Democratic Party nominee for United States Senator (class 2) from Delaware; 1936	Succeeded by E. Ennalls Berl
Political offices
U.S. Senate
Preceded by Daniel O. Hastings	U.S. Senator (class 2) from Delaware; 1937–1943; Served alongside: John G. Townsend Jr., James M. Tunnell	Succeeded by C. Douglass Buck
