= 1940 United States Senate election in Delaware =

- November 5, 1940
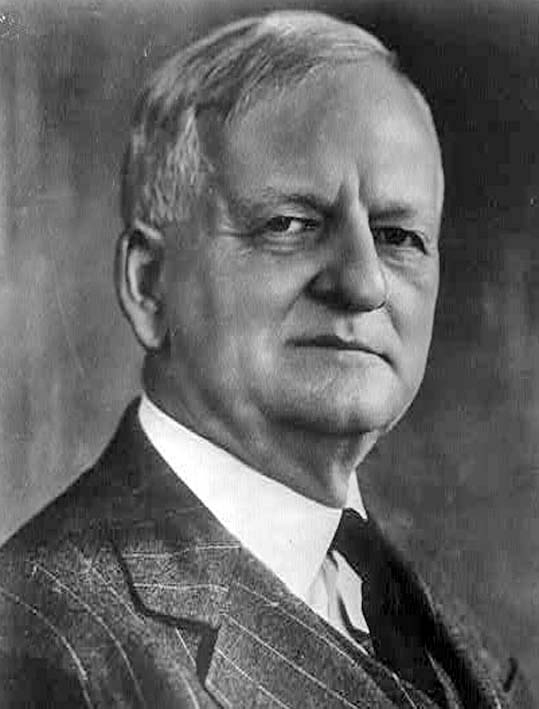

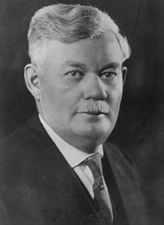
Nominee	James M. Tunnell	John G. Townsend Jr.
Party	Democratic	Republican
Popular vote	68,294	63,799
Percentage	50.63%	47.30%
- County results Tunnell: 50–60%
U.S. senator before election
John G. Townsend Jr.
Republican
Elected U.S. Senator
James M. Tunnell
Democratic

The 1940 United States Senate election in Delaware took place on November 5, 1940. Incumbent Republican U.S. Senator John G. Townsend Jr. ran for re-election to a third term in office, but was defeated by Democrat James M. Tunnell. This was the only seat that Democrats flipped during this cycle. This was the last time Democrats won Delaware's Class 1 Senate seat until Tom Carper's victory over Senator William Roth in 2000.

== General election ==
=== Candidates ===
- William F. Allen, former U.S. Representative from Seaford (Liberal Democratic)
- James M. Tunnell, Georgetown lawyer, banker and candidate for Senate in 1924 (Democratic)
- John G. Townsend Jr., incumbent Senator since 1929 (Republican)

=== Results ===
1940 U.S. Senate election in Delaware
Party	Candidate	Votes	%	±%
Democratic	James M. Tunnell	68,294	50.63%	▲4.47
Republican	John G. Townsend Jr. (incumbent)	63,799	47.30%	▼5.97
Liberal Democratic	William F. Allen	2,786	2.07%	N/A
Total votes		134,879	100.00%	
Democratic gain from Republican				

== See also ==
- 1940 United States Senate elections
