= 1922 United States Senate elections in Delaware =

- November 7, 1922
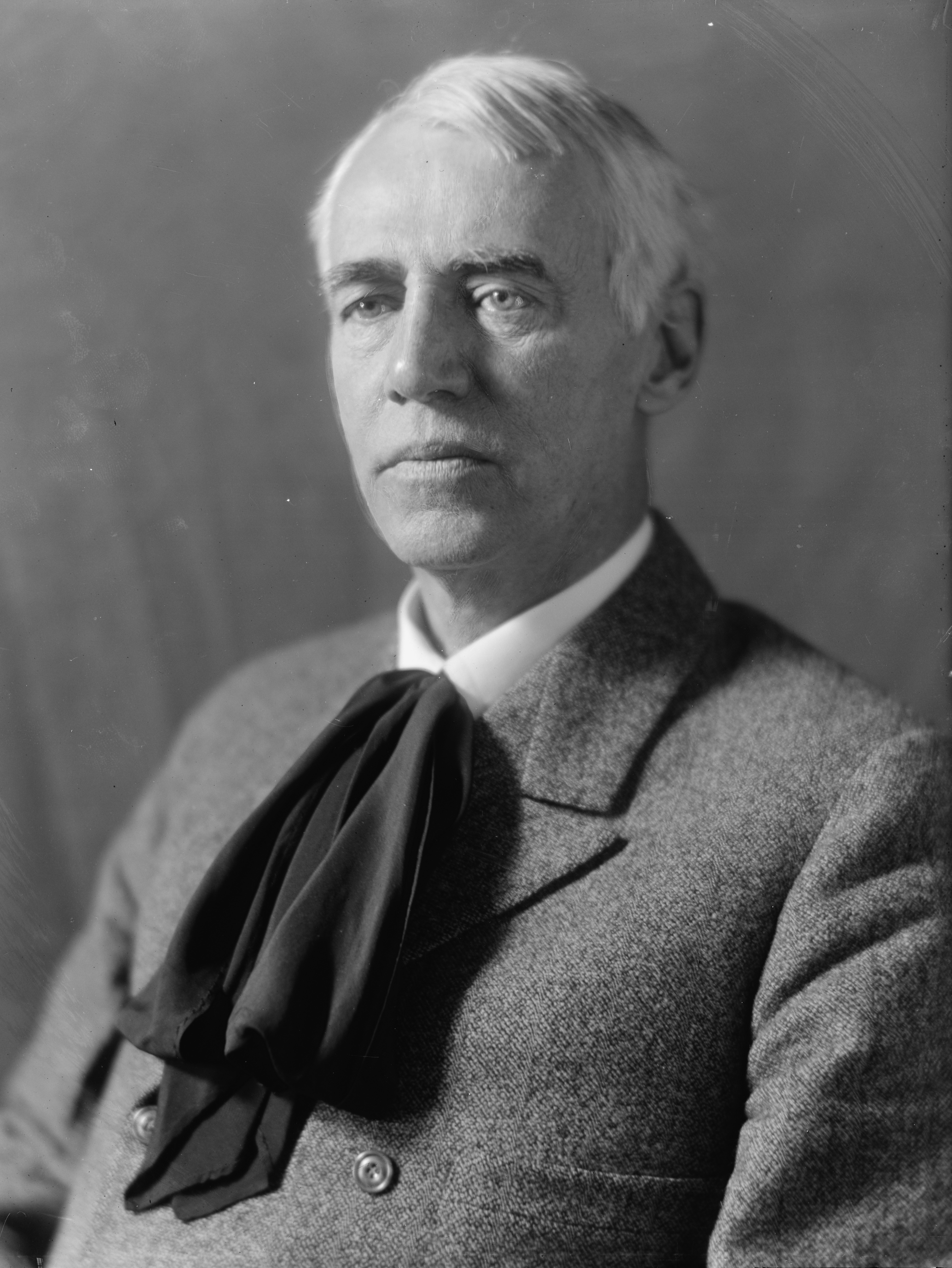

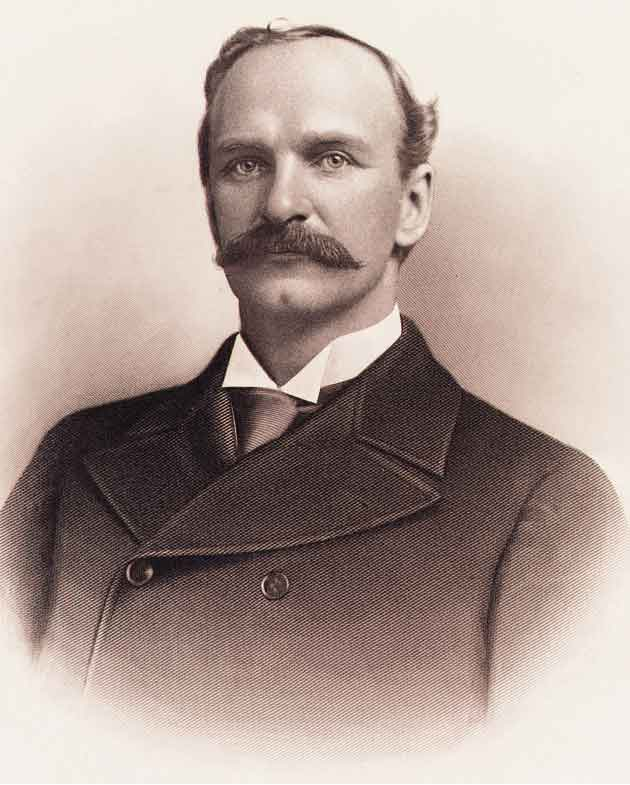
Nominee	Thomas F. Bayard Jr.	T. Coleman du Pont
Party	Democratic	Republican
Regular election	37,304; 49.81%	36,979; 49.38%
Special election	36,954; 49.65%	36,894; 49.57%
- County results Bayard: 50–60% Pont: 50–60%
U.S. senator before election
T. Coleman du Pont
Republican
Elected U.S. Senator
Thomas F. Bayard Jr.
Democratic

Two 1922 United States Senate elections in Delaware took place on November 7, 1922. The elections pitted Delaware's two most powerful families, the Republican du Ponts and the Democratic Bayards, against each other.

Incumbent Democratic senator Josiah O. Wolcott resigned on July 2, 1921, to accept an appointment as Chancellor of Delaware. Governor William D. Denney appointed businessman and Republican National Committeeman T. Coleman du Pont to fill the vacancy until a successor could be duly elected. Democrat Thomas F. Bayard Jr. narrowly won both the special election to complete Wolcott's term and the regularly scheduled election, both held on November 7. Because Bayard won both elections on the same day, he became a two-term senator, with his second term beginning March 4, 1923.

Bayard became the fifth and last member of his dynastic family to ever serve in the U.S. Senate. du Pont would later be elected to Delaware's other Senate seat and served alongside his counterpart Bayard from 1925 to 1928.

== General election ==
=== Candidates ===
- Thomas F. Bayard Jr., former chairman of the Democratic State Committee and son of former senator Thomas F. Bayard (Democratic)
- T. Coleman du Pont, incumbent senator since 1921 (Republican)
- Frank Stephens (Forward)

=== Results ===
1922 U.S. Senate election in Delaware
Party	Candidate	Votes	%	±%
Democratic	Thomas F. Bayard Jr.	37,304	49.81%	▲0.14
Republican	T. Coleman du Pont (incumbent)	36,979	49.38%	▲4.61
Forward	Frank Stephens	608	0.81%	N/A
Total votes		74,891	100.00%	
Democratic gain from Republican				

== Special election ==
1922 U.S. Senate special election in Delaware
Party	Candidate	Votes	%
Democratic	Thomas F. Bayard Jr.	36,954	49.65%
Republican	T. Coleman du Pont (incumbent)	36,894	49.57%
Forward	Frank Stephens	581	0.78%
Total votes		74,429	100.00%
Democratic gain from Republican			

== See also ==
- 1922 United States Senate elections
