= Thomas F. Bayard Jr. =

American politician (1868-1942)

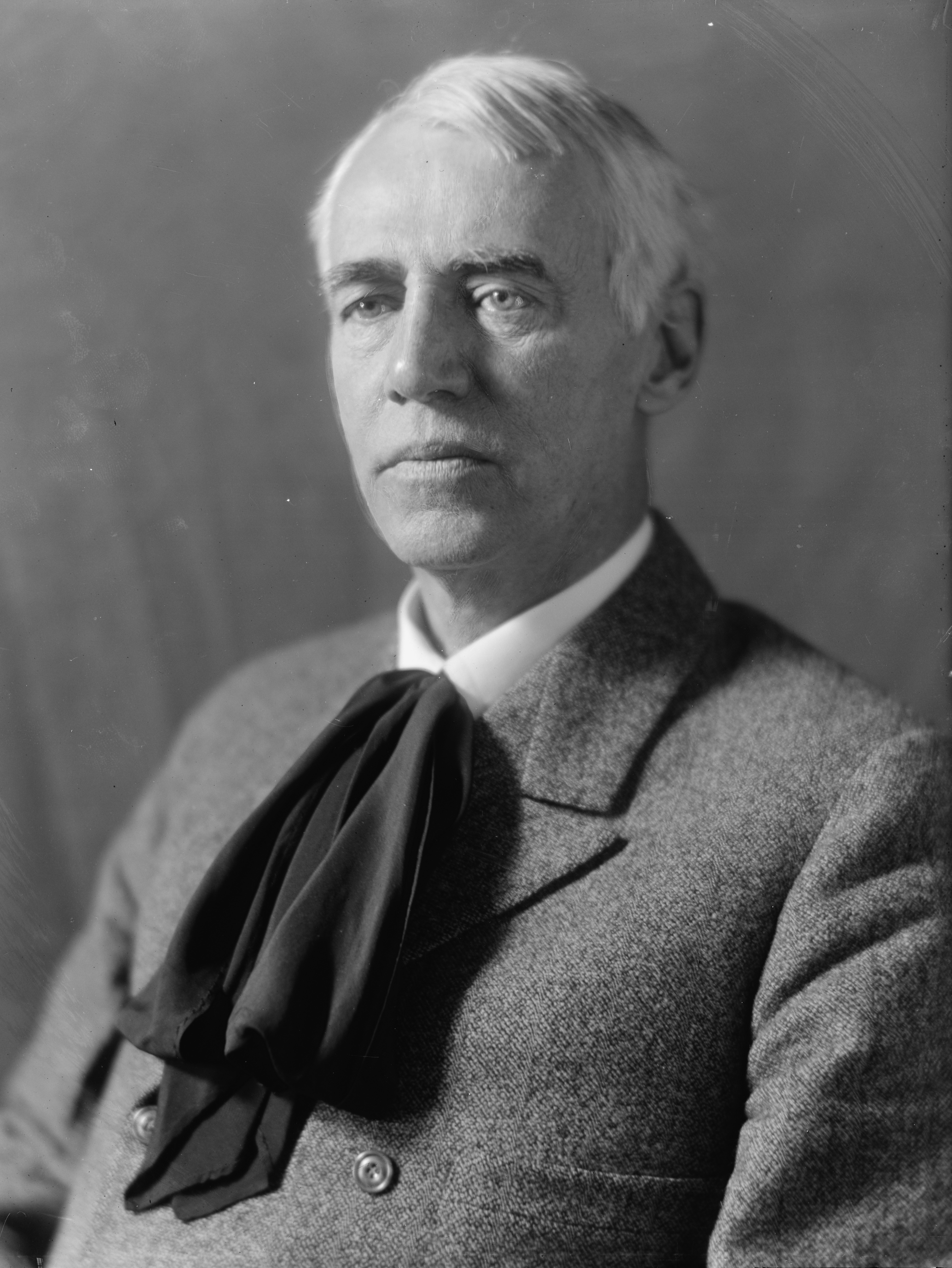
- Bayard in 1905

United States Senator from Delaware
- In office November 8, 1922 – March 3, 1929
- Preceded by: T. Coleman du Pont
- Succeeded by: John G. Townsend Jr.

Personal details
- Born: Thomas Francis Bayard Jr. June 4, 1868 Wilmington, Delaware, U.S.
- Died: July 12, 1942 (aged 74) Wilmington, Delaware, U.S.
- Party: Democratic
- Spouse: Elizabeth Bradford du Pont (m. 1908)
- Children: 5, including Alexis I. du Pont Bayard
- Parent: Thomas F. Bayard (father)
- Education: Yale University
- Profession: lawyer

Thomas Francis Bayard Jr. (June 4, 1868 – July 12, 1942) was an American lawyer and politician from Wilmington, Delaware. He was a Democratic U.S. senator from Delaware in the 1920s.

== Early life ==
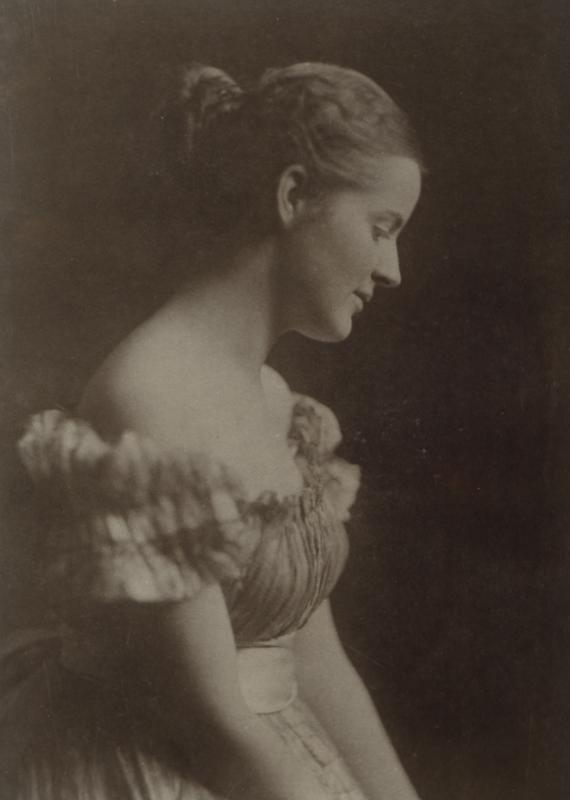
Elizabeth Bradford du Pont Bayard

Bayard was born in Wilmington, Delaware, the son of U.S. Senator Thomas F. Bayard Sr. and grandson of U.S. Senator James A. Bayard Jr.

Bayard graduated from Yale University in 1890, where he was a member of Skull and Bones and served as secretary of his class. He attended Yale Law School and was admitted to the Delaware Bar in 1893.

== Personal life ==
He married Elizabeth Bradford du Pont on October 3, 1908. Together, they had five children:

- Alexis I. du Pont Bayard (Feb. 10, 1918 in Wilmington, Delaware - Sep. 2, 1985 in Philadelphia, Pennsylvania) was a graduate of Yale University, politician and 13th Lieutenant Governor of Delaware. He married Jane Buckley Hildreth (Nov. 14, 1916 in Philadelphia, Pennsylvania - Dec. 12, 2008 in Palm Beach, Florida) in 1944. He died following heart surgery.
- Elizabeth
- Ellen
- James
- Thomas Francis Bayard III (Oct. 12, 1902 in Greenville, Delaware - Dec. 17, 1983 in Middleburg, Virginia) was a graduate of the University of Pennsylvania, and an executive at the DuPont Company. Married to Ruth Broadbent Castor (Mar. 27, 1906 - Jun. 21, 1994) in 1928 in Paris, divorced in 1944.

In 1901, Thomas Francis Bayard Jr. was a member of the Sons of the American Revolution, one of three successive generations of the Bayard family to belong to the Society. His own membership is recorded in the Delaware Society under National member number 14381, while his father (member number 1501) and his son (member number 94802) also appear in the SAR Patriot & Member Index.

== Career ==
After living in New York City for four years and working as assistant corporation counsel, he returned to his Delaware law practice in 1901. He served as chairman of the Delaware Democratic Party's state committee from 1906 to 1916, and as solicitor for the city of Wilmington from 1917 until 1919.

Bayard was elected to the U.S. Senate in a special election on November 7, 1922, to fill the vacancy caused by the resignation of U.S. Senator Josiah O. Wolcott. On the same day, he was also elected for the full term to follow, in both instances defeating incumbent Republican U.S. Senator T. Coleman du Pont (a cousin of Bayard's wife), who had been appointed. During this term, he served in the Democratic minority in the last session of the 67th Congress, and in the 68th, 69th, and 70th Congresses.

Bayard lost his bid for a second full term in 1928 to Republican John G. Townsend Jr., the former governor. He then lost another bid for a second full term in 1930 to incumbent Republican U.S. Senator Daniel O. Hastings. In all, Bayard served one term and part of another, from November 7, 1922, to March 3, 1929, during the administrations of U.S. presidents Warren G. Harding and Calvin Coolidge. Subsequently, he resumed his law practice in Wilmington.

== Death and legacy ==
Bayard died in Wilmington and is buried there in the Old Swedes Episcopal Church Cemetery. His son, Alexis I. du Pont Bayard, served as Lieutenant Governor of Delaware from 1949 to 1953.

He is the namesake of the town of Bayard, West Virginia.

Public offices
Office	Type	Location	Began office	Ended office	Notes
U.S. Senator	Legislature	Washington	November 7, 1922	March 3, 1923	
U.S. Senator	Legislative	Washington	March 4, 1923	March 3, 1929	

United States Congressional service
Dates	Congress	Chamber	Majority	President	Committees	Class/District
1922–1923	67th	U.S. Senate	Republican	Warren G. Harding; Calvin Coolidge		class 1
1923–1925	68th	U.S. Senate	Republican	Calvin Coolidge		class 1
1925–1927	69th	U.S. Senate	Republican	Calvin Coolidge		class 1
1927–1929	70th	U.S. Senate	Republican	Calvin Coolidge		class 1

Election results
Year	Office	Election	Subject	Party	Votes	%	Opponent	Party	Votes	%
1922	U.S. Senator	Special	Thomas F. Bayard Jr.	Democratic	36,954	50%	T. Coleman du Pont	Republican	36,894	50%
1922	U.S. Senator	General	Thomas F. Bayard Jr.	Democratic	37,304	50%	T. Coleman du Pont	Republican	36,979	49%
1928	U.S. Senator	General	Thomas F. Bayard Jr.	Democratic	40,828	39%	John G. Townsend Jr.	Republican	63,725	61%
1930	U.S. Senator	General	Thomas F. Bayard Jr.	Democratic	39,881	45%	Daniel O. Hastings	Republican	47,909	54%

Party political offices
Preceded by Josiah O. Wolcott	Democratic Party nominee for United States Senator (class 1) from Delaware; 1922, 1928	Succeeded by Wilbur L. Adams
Preceded by James M. Tunnell	Democratic Party nominee for United States Senator (class 2) from Delaware; 1930	Succeeded by James H. Hughes
U.S. Senate
Preceded by T. Coleman du Pont	U.S. senator from Delaware; 1922–1929	Succeeded by John G. Townsend Jr.
