= Earl D. Brooks II =

University administrator

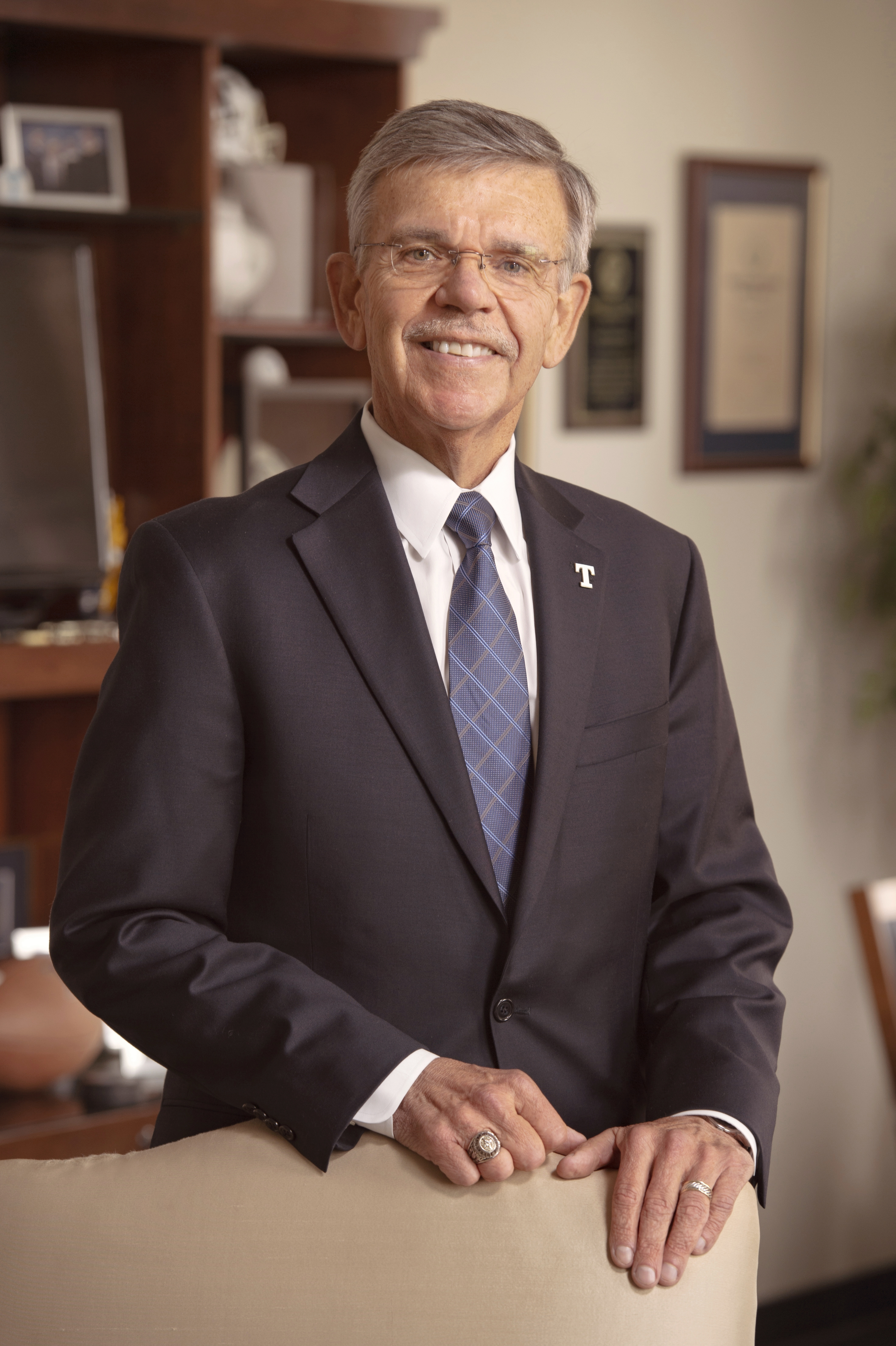
- Dr. Earl D. Brooks II

Earl D. Brooks II (born January 11, 1956) was the 16th and 18th president of Trine University in Angola, Indiana, serving in that position since June 2000. His tenure was the second-longest in the institution's history. At the time of his retirement on May 31, 2023, he was the longest-serving current college or university president in Indiana. He later returned as president on June 27, 2024, retiring again to serve as university chancellor on May 31, 2026.

== Early life and education ==
Brooks was born January 11, 1956, in Pineville, Kentucky. He attended Powell Valley High School in Speedwell, Tennessee. A first-generation college student who grew up on his family farm in east Tennessee, Brooks earned his Bachelor of Science in animal science, his Master of Science in management and his Ph.D. in animal nutrition from the University of Tennessee.

== Career ==
Brooks worked at Lincoln Memorial University in Harrogate, Tennessee, throughout his early career, beginning as a biology instructor and eventually became senior vice president and professor of biological sciences. In the latter role, he served as chief operating officer for the university.

In 1997, he joined Wesley College in Dover, Delaware, as executive vice president and professor of science. During his tenure, the college experienced significant enrollment growth and earned a Circle of Excellence award from the Council for the Advancement and Support of Education for fundraising excellence.

Brooks became president of what was then Tri-State University in June 2000, succeeding 15th president R. John Reynolds.

Under his leadership, operating deficits were eradicated and the university balanced its budget for over 20 consecutive years. Enrollment grew from 1,300 in 2000 to more than 14,000. The university raised more than $300 million, including capital campaigns of $90 million and $125 million, each the largest in university history. The university earned a Circle of Excellence award from the Council for the Advancement and Support of Education for fundraising excellence in 2006. The campus completed more than $200 million in new projects, including the Rick L. and Vicki L. James University Center, Ford Hall renovation, T. Furth Center for Performing Arts, Thunder Ice Arena, MTI Center Fabiani Residence Hall and Steel Dynamics Inc. Center for Engineering and Computing. New projects in 2025 include a new 200-bed residence hall and the John and Mary Pellegrino Student Design Center, part of a newly proposed $120 million master plan.

Brooks led the transition of the university's athletic programs from the NAIA to NCAA Division III, with Tri-State beginning NCAA provisional membership in fall 2004 and becoming a full NCAA Division III member in fall 2007. The university was accepted as a member of the Michigan Intercollegiate Athletic Association in 2002.

The university also greatly expanded its undergraduate programming and added its first graduate degrees, graduating its first master's degree students in 2005 and its first Doctor of Physical Therapy students in 2017.

== Honors and awards ==
In 2018, Indiana Gov. Eric Holcomb presented Brooks with the Sagamore of the Wabash, given to those who render distinguished service to the state of Indiana. In 2022, he was honored with the Lifetime Achievement Award by Greater Fort Wayne Business Weekly and inducted into Trine University's Athletic Hall of Fame. The university named the Dr. Earl D. and Melanie N. Brooks College of Health Professions in honor of him and his wife Melanie in 2023. He was inducted into the Greater Fort Wayne Business Hall of Fame in September 2023.

== Family ==
Brooks currently resides in Carmel, Indiana, with his wife Melanie. They have one daughter, Megan Hyer, and two grandchildren, Emma Brooke and Elizabeth Melanie Hyer.
