= John G. Townsend Jr. =

American politician (1871–1964)

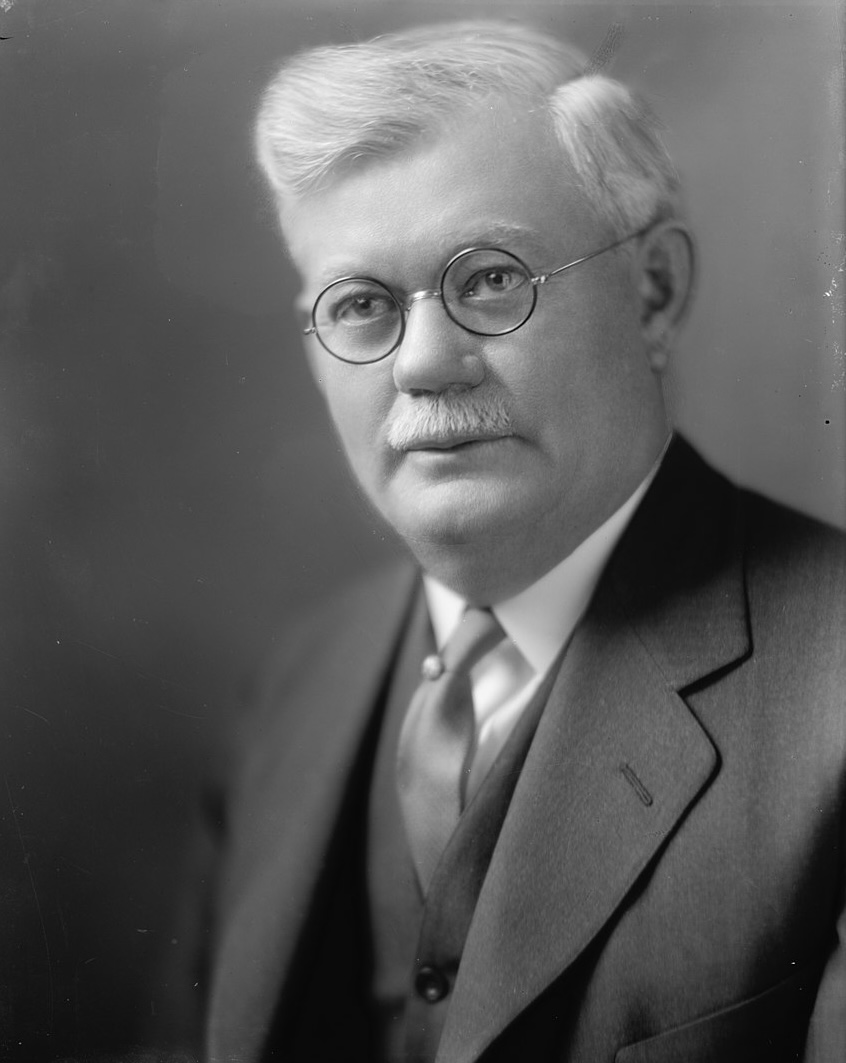
- Townsend, c. 1930

United States Senator from Delaware
- In office March 4, 1929 – January 3, 1941
- Preceded by: Thomas F. Bayard Jr.
- Succeeded by: James M. Tunnell

55th Governor of Delaware
- In office January 16, 1917 – January 18, 1921
- Lieutenant: Lewis T. Eliason
- Preceded by: Charles R. Miller
- Succeeded by: William D. Denney

Member of the Delaware House of Representatives
- In office January 13, 1903 - January 10, 1905

Personal details
- Born: John Gillis Townsend Jr. May 31, 1871 Worcester County, Maryland, U.S.
- Died: April 10, 1964 (aged 92) Philadelphia, Pennsylvania, U.S.
- Party: Republican
- Spouse: Jennie Collins
- Occupation: businessman

John Gillis Townsend Jr. (May 31, 1871 – April 10, 1964) was an American businessman and politician from Selbyville in Sussex County, Delaware. He was a member of the Republican Party who served one term as Governor and two terms as U.S. Senator from Delaware.

== Early life and family ==
Townsend was born in Bishopville, in Worcester County, Maryland, son of John Gillis Townsend and Mariedith Dukes Townsend. He married Jennie Collins, and they had seven children: John G. III, Jennie Thelma, Paul, Julia, Preston Coleman, Edith, and Lyla. His wife was killed in an automobile accident in 1919 while he was governor. They were members of the Methodist Church.

== Professional and political career ==
When the railroad first came through Bishopville, Townsend learned telegraphy and was hired by the Pennsylvania Railroad. Soon he recognized the need for railroad ties, set up a sawmill to make them, and began selling them. In 1896, he moved his family to Selbyville, Delaware, where he began growing strawberries. Before long he was known as the "Strawberry King." To better manage his business he set up his own bank, the Baltimore Trust Company, which became the state's second-largest bank. Townsend, Inc. moved into poultry, corn and soybeans. By the time he died, it was one of the state's largest and most diversified agricultural businesses. He continued his businesses after entering politics and returned to their management when he was not in office.

== Governor of Delaware ==
Townsend was elected to the Delaware House of Representatives and served one term during the 1903-04 session as a member of the Addicks, or Union Republican, faction of the Republican Party. He was elected Governor of Delaware in 1916 by defeating Democrat James H. Hughes, a lawyer from Dover, Delaware.

== United States Senator ==
Townsend was elected to the U.S. Senate in 1928, defeating incumbent Democratic U.S. Senator Thomas F. Bayard Jr. and was reelected in 1934, defeating former Democratic U.S. Representative Wilbur L. Adams. Townsend lost his bid for a third term in 1940 to Democrat James M. Tunnell, a lawyer from Georgetown, Delaware.

In the 72nd Congress, he was chairman of the Committee to Audit and Control the Contingent Expenses. He was also a member of the Mount Rushmore National Memorial Commission in 1939 and 1940.

== Death and legacy ==
Townsend died at age 92 in Philadelphia, and is buried in the Red Men's Cemetery at Selbyville.

"Townsend's administration was one of progressiveness and reform...all the major reforms of the 19th century came to maturity during this time: woman suffrage, new and better highways, prohibition, school reform, etc..."

Delaware General Assembly (sessions while Governor)
Year	Assembly	Senate majority	President pro tempore	House majority	Speaker
1917–1918	99th	Republican	John A. Barnard	Democratic	Hervey P. Hall
1919–1920	100th	Republican	Isaac D. Short	Republican	Alexander P. Corbit

== Almanac ==
Elections are held the first Tuesday after November 1. Members of the Delaware General Assembly take office the second Tuesday of January. State representatives have a two-year term. The governor takes office the third Tuesday of January and has a four-year term. U.S. Senators are popularly elected and took office March 4 until 1935, when they began taking office January 3 for a six-year term.

Public offices
Office	Type	Location	Began office	Ended office	Notes
State Representative	Legislature	Dover	January 13, 1903	January 10, 1905	
Governor	Executive	Dover	January 16, 1917	January 18, 1921	
U.S. Senator	Legislature	Washington	March 4, 1929	January 3, 1935	
U.S. Senator	Legislature	Washington	January 3, 1935	January 3, 1941	

Delaware General Assembly service
Dates	Assembly	Chamber	Majority	Governor	Committees	District
1903–1904	92nd	State House	Republican	John Hunn		Sussex 7th

United States Congress service
Dates	Congress	Chamber	Majority	President	Committees	Class/District
1929–1931	71st	U.S. Senate	Republican	Herbert Hoover		class 1
1931–1933	72nd	U.S. Senate	Republican	Herbert Hoover	Audit and Control	class 1
1933–1934	73rd	U.S. Senate	Democratic	Franklin D. Roosevelt		class 1
1935–1936	74th	U.S. Senate	Democratic	Franklin D. Roosevelt		class 1
1937–1938	75th	U.S. Senate	Democratic	Franklin D. Roosevelt		class 1
1939–1940	76th	U.S. Senate	Democratic	Franklin D. Roosevelt		class 1

Election results
Year	Office	Subject	Party	Votes	%	Opponent	Party	Votes	%
1916	Governor	John G. Townsend Jr.	Republican	26,664	52%	James H. Hughes	Democratic	24,053	47%
1928	U.S. Senator	John G. Townsend Jr.	Republican	63,725	61%	Thomas F. Bayard Jr.	Democratic	40,828	39%
1934	U.S. Senator	John G. Townsend Jr.	Republican	52,829	53%	Wilbur L. Adams	Democratic	45,771	46%
1940	U.S. Senator	John G. Townsend Jr.	Republican	63,799	47%	James M. Tunnell	Democratic	68,294	51%

== Images ==
- Biographical Directory of the United States Congress

Party political offices
Preceded by Charles R. Miller	Republican nominee for Governor of Delaware; 1916	Succeeded by William D. Denney
Preceded by T. Coleman du Pont	Republican nominee for U.S. Senator from Delaware (Class 1); 1928, 1934, 1940	Succeeded by John J. Williams
Political offices
Preceded by Charles R. Miller	Governor of Delaware; 1917–1921	Succeeded by William D. Denney
U.S. Senate
Preceded by Thomas F. Bayard Jr.	U.S. Senator from Delaware; 1929–1941	Succeeded by James M. Tunnell
