= Trine University =

Private university in Angola, Indiana, U.S.

- Former names: Tri-State Normal College (1884–1906); Tri-State College (1906–1975); Tri-State University (1975–2008)
- Type: Private university
- Established: 1884; 142 years ago
- Academic affiliations: Space-grant
- Endowment: $190 million
- President: Tony Kline
- Students: 2,343 Angola campus, 14,516 total
- Location: Angola and Fort Wayne, Indiana, U.S. 41°37′56″N 85°00′20″W
- Campus: Rural, 450 acres (180 ha)
- Colors: Navy blue, white and Vegas gold
- Nickname: Thunder
- Sporting affiliations: NCAA Division III, MIAA
- Mascots: Storm, a white tiger
- Website: trine.edu
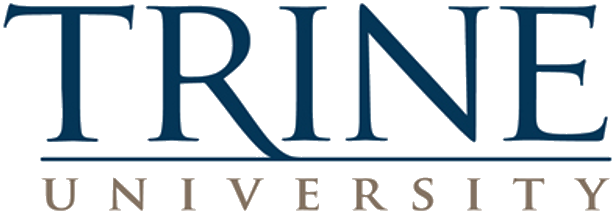

- Location within Indiana

Trine University is a private university in Angola, Indiana, and Fort Wayne, Indiana, with education centers in Detroit, Phoenix, and Reston, Virginia. It was founded in 1884 and is accredited by the Higher Learning Commission.

== History ==
"Tri-State Normal College" was established in 1884. For more than 120 years its name was derived from and referred to the "tri-state" area because of its location in Indiana with proximity to Michigan and Ohio. In 1906, the school name was shortened to "Tri-State College", and in 1975 it became "Tri-State University".

In 2008, the school's name was changed to "Trine University" to honor alumni and significant donors, Ralph Trine and his wife Sheri. The dropping of the "tri-state" identifier reflected a desire to brand the school as a nationally competitive private university, not to be mistaken for state-funded or associated with businesses or organizations nationwide also using the term "tri-state". During the 1990s, the university opened several education centers throughout northern and central Indiana. Those education center programs were eventually moved to online.

The school served its regional population, first as a teachers and engineering school with flexible evening and weekend courses and then broadening into a multidisciplinary institution with an expansion of daytime classes, an athletics program and more robust student life offerings. On June 1, 1963, Tri-State succeeded in achieving its initial regional accreditation. It has remained an accredited institution since that time, most recently extending its Level V accreditation until the next (2026) evaluation visit. Further, the Ketner School of Business was reaffirmed by the Accreditation Council for Business Schools and Programs (ACBSP) on February 26, 2019.

In 2002, the school joined the Michigan Intercollegiate Athletic Association (MIAA), and, coinciding with the opening of the $650,000 Ketner Sports Complex, Tri-State attained NCAA Division III provisional membership.

After teaching undergraduate engineering courses for over 100 years, the university graduated its first class of Master of Science in Engineering Technology students in 2005.

== Campus ==
Trine's Angola, Indiana, campus covers 450 acres (1.8 km^{2}). Campus facilities have been greatly expanded since 2000, with more than $176 million invested in building projects during that time. In addition to multiple residential facilities, recent additions have included the T. Furth Center for Performing Arts, a music education and concert venue, the Thunder Ice Arena, which allowed the university to launch hockey and skating teams and offer community skating programs, the MTI Center, serving basketball, bowling and esports, and the Steel Dynamics Inc. Center for Engineering and Computing. The university has also expanded Best Hall of Science twice since 2016 to accommodate its growing number of health sciences students.

Trine's Brooks College of Health Professions is currently located in Fort Wayne, Indiana, at 12817 Parkview Plaza Drive near Parkview Regional Medical Center. The new facility, named for Trine's 16th president, Earl D. Brooks II, and his wife Melanie, opened in fall 2024.

The university's Detroit Education Center is located at 999 Republic Drive, Suite 200, Allen Park. The Phoenix Education Center is located at the Maricopa County Medical Society Building, 326 E Coronado Road, Phoenix, Arizona. The Reston Education Center is located at 1881 Campus Commons Drive. The sites offer students the opportunity to earn a master's degree through Trine University in a hybrid format.

== Academics ==
Trine offers associate degrees, bachelor's degrees, master's degrees, and a doctorate in more than 50 fields of study (39 traditional undergraduate degrees) and has a 16:1 student-to-faculty ratio. For more than 100 years after the founding of its engineering school in 1902, the university focused heavily on engineering education, and engineering majors still make up more than 40 percent of its student body. Trine continues to expand its engineering and technology programs, most recently adding majors in mechatronics and robotics and extended reality. The university also launched the Trine Center for Technical Training in fall 2022 to provide technical training and professional development to area businesses, workers and students.

In addition to undergraduate programs on its Angola campus and health professions programs in Fort Wayne, the university offers graduate degrees at its Detroit and Phoenix education centers. It also offers undergraduate and graduate degrees in the broad categories of business administration, engineering and technology, general students, healthcare, leadership and justice and psychology through TrineOnline. Its most popular undergraduate majors, by 2021 graduates, were:

- Exercise Science and Kinesiology (53)
- Design Engineering Technology (49)
- Mechanical Engineering (33)
- Biology/Biological Sciences (30)
- Civil Engineering (28)
- Criminal Justice/Safety Studies (23)
- Biomedical Engineering (22)
- Business/Commerce (21)
- Chemical Engineering (21)

=== Accreditation ===
Trine University is accredited by the Higher Learning Commission. Several individual programs are also accredited by programmatic accreditors:

- Engineering (biomedical, chemical, civil, computer, electrical, mechanical and software): ABET
- Teacher preparation: Council for the Accreditation of Educator Preparation
- Business administration (associate and bachelor's), associate in accounting: Accreditation Council for Business Schools and Programs
- Physical therapy: Commission on Accreditation in Physical Therapy Education
- Physician assistant studies: Accreditation Review Commission on Education for the Physician Assistant
- RN-BSN: Commission on Collegiate Nursing Education
- Surgical Technology: Commission on Accreditation of Allied Health Education Programs

== Student life ==
More than 2,200 students live on the Angola campus which hosts approximately 60 varied campus groups from professional or major-specific clubs, recreational sports, religiously affiliated groups, and an array of hobby or interest clubs.

The university has seen significant growth in the number of its residential students, currently boasting more than four times as many students living on campus as it had in 2000. As a result, the university has added several newer residential facilities, including the Golf Course Apartments, Villas, Reiners and Stadium Halls, and Fabiani Hall. In addition, upperclass students have the option of living in Greek housing or Christian Campus House facilities.

== Athletics ==
The Trine athletic teams are called the Thunder. The university is a member of the Division III level of the National Collegiate Athletic Association (NCAA), primarily competing in the Michigan Intercollegiate Athletic Association (MIAA) since the 2004–05 academic year. The Thunder previously competed as an NCAA D-III Independent during the 2003–04 school year; in the Wolverine–Hoosier Athletic Conference (WHAC) of the National Association of Intercollegiate Athletics (NAIA) from 1992–93 to 2002–03; and in the NAIA's Mid-Central College Conference (MCCC; now currently known as the Crossroads League since the 2012–13 school year) from 1959–60 to 1980–81.

Trine competes in 36 intercollegiate varsity sports: Men's sports include baseball, basketball, bowling, cross country, football, golf, ice hockey, lacrosse, rugby, soccer, tennis, track & field, volleyball, and wrestling; while women's sports include acrobatics & tumbling, basketball, bowling, cross country, golf, ice hockey, lacrosse, soccer, softball, tennis, track & field, triathlon, volleyball, and wrestling.

Trine University athletic teams have won or been finalists for several national titles. In 2021, the women's triathlon team won the DIII title in the Women's Triathlon Collegiate National Championships. In 2024, Trine won the NCAA Division III men's basketball championship. On June 7, 2023, the Trine University softball team finished the season as the NCAA Division III National Champion, defeating Salisbury 1–0 on a walk-off RBI. The team repeated as national champion in 2025.

In 2022, the women's basketball team advanced to the NCAA Division III Final Four and the softball team finished second in NCAA Division III.

=== Ice hockey ===
Trine added men's and women's hockey as varsity sports in the fall of 2017. The programs are housed in the Thunder Ice Arena, which also opened in 2017. Trine's NCAA Division III teams compete in the Northern Collegiate Hockey Association.

=== Men's volleyball ===
Men's volleyball, which had last played at the varsity level in 2002, returned to full varsity status for the 2019 season (2018–19 school year) and plays in the Midwest Collegiate Volleyball League.

=== Facilities ===
Trine's Zollner Golf Course, which has been part of the university since 1971, hosted the 2012 NCAA Division III Women's Golf National Championships. The course was named the sixth-best collegiate course in the nation by Golf Advisor in 2020.

The university's other athletic facilities include:

- Zollner Stadium and Shive Field (football, lacrosse and rugby)
- Jannen Field (baseball)
- SportONE/Parkview Softball Field
- Weaver Field (soccer)
- Keith E. Busse/Steel Dynamics Inc. Athletic and Recreation (indoor track and field; indoor practice facility for tennis, baseball and softball)
- Hershey Hall (volleyball and wrestling)
- MTI Center (basketball, bowling and e-sports)
- Ryan Tennis Center

== Notable alumni ==
- Brett Halliday – author
- Lewis Blaine Hershey - United States Army general and second Director of the Selective Service System
- Ralph Ketner – co-founder of Food Town, later to become Food Lion
- Shaziman Abu Mansor - Malaysian politician
- John J. McKetta – chemical engineer
- Gustavo Rojas Pinilla – Colombia army general and 19th President of Colombia
- Joe Schroeder – Olympic rugby player
