= Political party strength in Delaware =

Politics in the US state of Delaware

Delaware is a state in the Mid-Atlantic region of the United States. The Government of Delaware is composed of the executive branch, legislative branch, and judicial branch. Delaware's executive branch has five elected offices, they are Governor, Lieutenant Governor, Attorney General, State Treasurer, Auditor of Accounts, and Insurance Commissioner. The state legislature is made of the Delaware House of Representatives and Delaware Senate. From 1776 to 1792, the position of Governor was known as President.

Additionally, the state sends two senators and one representative to the United States Congress. All three seats are elected at-large. As of the 2024 House of Representatives election, the state's representative is Sarah McBride, the first openly transgender person elected to Congress.

In the 1960s and 1970s the state's politics were dominated by the Republican party. In the 1980s the state began to shift towards the Democratic party. Writing for The News Journal, William B. Golin credited the shift towards the Democratic party to the upset victory of then-County Councilman Joe Biden in the 1972 United States Senate election.

== 1777–1900 ==
Year	Executive offices				General Assembly		United States Congress			Electoral votes (Note: In years in which a presidential election was not held, the table indicates the winner of the most recent election.)
Year	Governor	Attorney General	Treasurer	Auditor	State Senate	State House	U.S. Senator (Class I)	U.S. Senator (Class II)	U.S. House	Electoral votes
1777	John McKinly (NP/F) (Note: President of Delaware) (Note: Presidency ended after being captured by the British army during the Revolutionary War.)	—N/a					no such office		(Note: During the Continental Congress and the Articles of Confederation the number of delgates that were sent to Congress varried and regardless of the number, entire the delegation only received one vote as a state.)	no elections held
1777	Thomas McKean (NP/DR) (Note: Succeeded to office upon the capture of McKinly and resigned upon the return of George Read.)	—N/a					no such office		(Note: During the Continental Congress and the Articles of Confederation the number of delgates that were sent to Congress varried and regardless of the number, entire the delegation only received one vote as a state.)	no elections held
1777	George Read (NP/F) (Note: Succeeded to office upon the resignation of his predecessor.)	—N/a					no such office		(Note: During the Continental Congress and the Articles of Confederation the number of delgates that were sent to Congress varried and regardless of the number, entire the delegation only received one vote as a state.)	no elections held
1778	George Read (NP/F)	Gunning Bedford Jr. (F)	Samuel Patterson				no such office		(Note: During the Continental Congress and the Articles of Confederation the number of delgates that were sent to Congress varried and regardless of the number, entire the delegation only received one vote as a state.)	no elections held
1778	Caesar Rodney (NP/DR)	Gunning Bedford Jr. (F)	Samuel Patterson				no such office		(Note: During the Continental Congress and the Articles of Confederation the number of delgates that were sent to Congress varried and regardless of the number, entire the delegation only received one vote as a state.)	no elections held
1779	Caesar Rodney (NP/DR)	Gunning Bedford Jr. (F)	Samuel Patterson				no such office		(Note: During the Continental Congress and the Articles of Confederation the number of delgates that were sent to Congress varried and regardless of the number, entire the delegation only received one vote as a state.)	no elections held
1780	Caesar Rodney (NP/DR)	Gunning Bedford Jr. (F)	Samuel Patterson				no such office		(Note: During the Continental Congress and the Articles of Confederation the number of delgates that were sent to Congress varried and regardless of the number, entire the delegation only received one vote as a state.)	no elections held
1781	Caesar Rodney (NP/DR)	Gunning Bedford Jr. (F)	Samuel Patterson				no such office		(Note: During the Continental Congress and the Articles of Confederation the number of delgates that were sent to Congress varried and regardless of the number, entire the delegation only received one vote as a state.)	no elections held
1781	John Dickinson (NP/F) (Note: Resigned to accept election as president of Pennsylvania.)	Gunning Bedford Jr. (F)	Samuel Patterson				no such office		(Note: During the Continental Congress and the Articles of Confederation the number of delgates that were sent to Congress varried and regardless of the number, entire the delegation only received one vote as a state.)	no elections held
1782	John Dickinson (NP/F)	Gunning Bedford Jr. (F)	Samuel Patterson				no such office		(Note: During the Continental Congress and the Articles of Confederation the number of delgates that were sent to Congress varried and regardless of the number, entire the delegation only received one vote as a state.)	no elections held
1782	John Cook (NP/F)	Gunning Bedford Jr. (F)	Samuel Patterson				no such office		(Note: During the Continental Congress and the Articles of Confederation the number of delgates that were sent to Congress varried and regardless of the number, entire the delegation only received one vote as a state.)	no elections held
1783	John Cook (NP/F)	Gunning Bedford Jr. (F)	Samuel Patterson				no such office		(Note: During the Continental Congress and the Articles of Confederation the number of delgates that were sent to Congress varried and regardless of the number, entire the delegation only received one vote as a state.)	no elections held
1783	Nicholas Van Dyke (NP/DR)	Gunning Bedford Jr. (F)	Samuel Patterson				no such office		(Note: During the Continental Congress and the Articles of Confederation the number of delgates that were sent to Congress varried and regardless of the number, entire the delegation only received one vote as a state.)	no elections held
1784	Nicholas Van Dyke (NP/DR)	Gunning Bedford Jr. (F)	Samuel Patterson				no such office		(Note: During the Continental Congress and the Articles of Confederation the number of delgates that were sent to Congress varried and regardless of the number, entire the delegation only received one vote as a state.)	no elections held
1785	Nicholas Van Dyke (NP/DR)	Gunning Bedford Jr. (F)	James Tilton				no such office		(Note: During the Continental Congress and the Articles of Confederation the number of delgates that were sent to Congress varried and regardless of the number, entire the delegation only received one vote as a state.)	no elections held
1786	Nicholas Van Dyke (NP/DR)	Gunning Bedford Jr. (F)	James Tilton				no such office		(Note: During the Continental Congress and the Articles of Confederation the number of delgates that were sent to Congress varried and regardless of the number, entire the delegation only received one vote as a state.)	no elections held
1786	Thomas Collins (NP/F) (Note: Died in office.)	Gunning Bedford Jr. (F)	Joshua Clayton (NP/F)				no such office		(Note: During the Continental Congress and the Articles of Confederation the number of delgates that were sent to Congress varried and regardless of the number, entire the delegation only received one vote as a state.)	no elections held
1787	Thomas Collins (NP/F)	Gunning Bedford Jr. (F)	Joshua Clayton (NP/F)	Eleazer McComb			no such office		(Note: During the Continental Congress and the Articles of Confederation the number of delgates that were sent to Congress varried and regardless of the number, entire the delegation only received one vote as a state.)	no elections held
1788	Thomas Collins (NP/F)	Gunning Bedford Jr. (F)	Joshua Clayton (NP/F)	Eleazer McComb			no such office		(Note: During the Continental Congress and the Articles of Confederation the number of delgates that were sent to Congress varried and regardless of the number, entire the delegation only received one vote as a state.)	no elections held
1789	Thomas Collins (NP/F)	Gunning Bedford Jr. (F)	Joshua Clayton (NP/F)	Eleazer McComb			George Read (PA) (Note: Resigned.)	Richard Bassett (AA)	John Vining (PA)	Washington/ Adams (I) ✓
1789	Jehu Davis (NP/F) (Note: Succeeded to office upon the death of his predecessor.)	Gunning Bedford Jr. (F)	Joshua Clayton (NP/F)	Eleazer McComb			George Read (PA)	Richard Bassett (AA)	John Vining (PA)	Washington/ Adams (I) ✓
1789	Joshua Clayton (NP/F)	Gunning Bedford Jr. (F)	John Gordon	Eleazer McComb			George Read (PA)	Richard Bassett (AA)	John Vining (PA)	Washington/ Adams (I) ✓
1790	Joshua Clayton (NP/F)	Nicholas Ridgely	John Gordon	Eleazer McComb			George Read (PA)	Richard Bassett (AA)	John Vining (PA)	Washington/ Adams (I) ✓
1791	Joshua Clayton (NP/F)	Nicholas Ridgely	Francis Many	Eleazer McComb			George Read (PA)	Richard Bassett (PA)	John Vining (PA)	Washington/ Adams (I) ✓
1792	Joshua Clayton (NP/F)	Nicholas Ridgely	Robert Clark	Eleazer McComb			George Read (PA)	Richard Bassett (PA)	John Vining (PA)	Washington/ Adams (I) ✓
1793	Joshua Clayton (F)	Nicholas Ridgely	Robert Clark	Eleazer McComb			George Read (PA)	John Vining (PA)	John Patten (AA)	Washington/ Adams (I) ✓
1794	Joshua Clayton (F)	Nicholas Ridgely	Thomas Sipple	Thomas Montgomery			vacant	John Vining (PA)	Henry Latimer (PA) (Note: Successfully contested Patten's election.)	Washington/ Adams (I) ✓
1795	Joshua Clayton (F)	Nicholas Ridgely	Thomas Sipple				Henry Latimer (PA)	John Vining (PA)	Henry Latimer (PA)	Washington/ Adams (I) ✓
1795	Joshua Clayton (F)	Nicholas Ridgely	Thomas Sipple				Henry Latimer (F)	John Vining (F)	John Patten (DR)	Washington/ Adams (I) ✓
1796	Gunning Bedford Sr. (F)	Nicholas Ridgely	Thomas Sipple				Henry Latimer (F)	John Vining (F)	John Patten (DR)	Adams/ Pinckney (F) ✓
1797	Gunning Bedford Sr. (F)	Nicholas Ridgely	Thomas Sipple		F majority	14F, 7DR	Henry Latimer (F)	John Vining (F)	James A. Bayard (F)	Adams/ Pinckney (F) ✓
1797	Daniel Rogers (F)	Nicholas Ridgely	Thomas Sipple		F majority	14F, 7DR	Henry Latimer (F)	John Vining (F)	James A. Bayard (F)	Adams/ Pinckney (F) ✓
1798	Daniel Rogers (F)	Nicholas Ridgely	John Clarke		F majority	F majority	Henry Latimer (F)	Joshua Clayton (F)	James A. Bayard (F)	Adams/ Pinckney (F) ✓
1799	Richard Bassett (F) (Note: Resigned to accept appointment to U.S. District Court.)	Nicholas Ridgely	John Clarke		F majority	F majority	Henry Latimer (F)	William H. Wells (F)	James A. Bayard (F)	Adams/ Pinckney (F) ✓
1800	Richard Bassett (F)	Nicholas Ridgely	John Clarke		F majority	14F, 7DR	Henry Latimer (F)	William H. Wells (F)	James A. Bayard (F)	Adams/ Pinckney (F) ✗
1801	Richard Bassett (F)	Nicholas Van Dyke (F)	John Clarke		6F, 3DR	14F, 7DR	Samuel White (F)	William H. Wells (F)	James A. Bayard (F)	Adams/ Pinckney (F) ✗
1801	James Sykes (F)	Nicholas Van Dyke (F)	John Clarke		6F, 3DR	14F, 7DR	Samuel White (F)	William H. Wells (F)	James A. Bayard (F)	Adams/ Pinckney (F) ✗
1802	David Hall (DR)	Nicholas Van Dyke (F)	John Clarke		6F, 3DR	14F, 7DR	Samuel White (F)	William H. Wells (F)	James A. Bayard (F)	Adams/ Pinckney (F) ✗
1803	David Hall (DR)	Nicholas Van Dyke (F)	John Clarke		6F, 3DR	14F, 7DR	Samuel White (F)	William H. Wells (F)	Caesar Augustus Rodney (DR)	Adams/ Pinckney (F) ✗
1804	David Hall (DR)	Nicholas Van Dyke (F)	John Clarke		6F, 3DR	14F, 7DR	Samuel White (F)	William H. Wells (F)	Caesar Augustus Rodney (DR)	Pinckney/ King (F) ✗
1805	Nathaniel Mitchell (F)	Nicholas Van Dyke (F)	John Clarke		6F, 3DR	14F, 7DR	Samuel White (F)	James A. Bayard (F)	James M. Broom (F)	Pinckney/ King (F) ✗
1806	Nathaniel Mitchell (F)	Outerbridge Horsey (F)	John Clarke		6F, 3DR	14F, 7DR	Samuel White (F)	James A. Bayard (F)	James M. Broom (F)	Pinckney/ King (F) ✗
1807	Nathaniel Mitchell (F)	Outerbridge Horsey (F)	John Clarke		6F, 3DR	14F, 7DR	Samuel White (F)	James A. Bayard (F)	vacant	Pinckney/ King (F) ✗
1808	George Truitt (F)	Outerbridge Horsey (F)	Henry Molleston (F)		6F, 3DR	14F, 7DR	Samuel White (F)	James A. Bayard (F)	Nicholas Van Dyke (F)	Pinckney/ King (F) ✗
1809	George Truitt (F)	Outerbridge Horsey (F)	Henry Molleston (F)		6F, 3DR	14F, 7DR	Samuel White (F)	James A. Bayard (F)	Nicholas Van Dyke (F)	Pinckney/ King (F) ✗
1810	George Truitt (F)	Thomas Clayton (F)	Henry Molleston (F)		6F, 3DR	14F, 7DR	Outerbridge Horsey (F)	James A. Bayard (F)	Nicholas Van Dyke (F)	Pinckney/ King (F) ✗
1811	Joseph Haslet (DR)	Thomas Clayton (F)	Henry Molleston (F)		6F, 3DR	14F, 7DR	Outerbridge Horsey (F)	James A. Bayard (F)	Henry M. Ridgely (F)	Pinckney/ King (F) ✗
1812	Joseph Haslet (DR)	Thomas Clayton (F)	Henry Molleston (F)		6F, 3DR	14F, 7DR	Outerbridge Horsey (F)	James A. Bayard (F)	Henry M. Ridgely (F)	Clinton/ Ingersoll (F) ✗
1813	Joseph Haslet (DR)	Thomas Clayton (F)	Henry Molleston (F)		6F, 3DR	14F, 7DR	Outerbridge Horsey (F)	William H. Wells (F)	2F	Clinton/ Ingersoll (F) ✗
1814	Daniel Rodney (F)	Thomas Clayton (F)	Samuel Paynter (F)		6F, 3DR	14F, 7DR	Outerbridge Horsey (F)	William H. Wells (F)	2F	Clinton/ Ingersoll (F) ✗
1815	Daniel Rodney (F)	James Rogers	Samuel Paynter (F)		6F, 3DR	14F, 7DR	Outerbridge Horsey (F)	William H. Wells (F)	2F	Clinton/ Ingersoll (F) ✗
1816	Daniel Rodney (F)	James Rogers	Samuel Paynter (F)		7F, 2DR	14F, 7DR	Outerbridge Horsey (F)	William H. Wells (F)	2F	King/ Howard (F) ✗
1817	John Clark (F)	James Rogers	Samuel Paynter (F)		7F, 2DR	14F, 7DR	Outerbridge Horsey (F)	Nicholas Van Dyke (F)	1F, 1DR	King/ Howard (F) ✗
1818	John Clark (F)	James Rogers	Cornelius P. Comegys (F)		6F, 3DR	14F, 7DR	Outerbridge Horsey (F)	Nicholas Van Dyke (F)	1F, 1DR	King/ Howard (F) ✗
1819	John Clark (F)	James Rogers	Cornelius P. Comegys (F)		6F, 3DR	14F, 7DR	Outerbridge Horsey (F)	Nicholas Van Dyke (F)	1F, 1DR	King/ Howard (F) ✗
1820	Henry Molleston (F) (Note: Died before taking office; never served as governor.)	James Rogers	Cornelius P. Comegys (F)		6F, 3DR	14F, 7DR	Outerbridge Horsey (F)	Nicholas Van Dyke (F)	1F, 1DR	Monroe/ Tompkins (DR) ✓
1820	Jacob Stout (F) (Note: Assumed office upon the death of Governor-elect Molleston.)	James Rogers	Cornelius P. Comegys (F)		6F, 3DR	14F, 7DR	Outerbridge Horsey (F)	Nicholas Van Dyke (F)	1F, 1DR	Monroe/ Tompkins (DR) ✓
1821	John Collins (DR)	James Rogers	Cornelius P. Comegys (F)		6F, 3DR	14F, 7DR	vacant (Note: Legislature failed to elect a senator.)	Nicholas Van Dyke (F)	1F, 1DR	Monroe/ Tompkins (DR) ✓
1822	John Collins (DR)	James Rogers	Cornelius P. Comegys (F)		5DR, 4F	11DR, 10F	Cesar Augustus Rodney (DR)	Nicholas Van Dyke (F)	2F	Monroe/ Tompkins (DR) ✓
1822	Caleb Rodney (F)	James Rogers	Cornelius P. Comegys (F)		5DR, 4F	11DR, 10F	Cesar Augustus Rodney (DR)	Nicholas Van Dyke (F)	2F	Monroe/ Tompkins (DR) ✓
1823	Joseph Haslet (DR)	James Rogers	Ezekiel Cowgill		5DR, 4F	13DR, 8F	vacant	vacant	Louis McLane (F)	Monroe/ Tompkins (DR) ✓
1823	Charles Thomas (DR)	James Rogers	Ezekiel Cowgill		5DR, 4F	13DR, 8F	vacant	vacant	Louis McLane (F)	Monroe/ Tompkins (DR) ✓
1824	Samuel Paynter (F)	James Rogers	William W. Green		5F, 4DR	14F, 7DR	Thomas Clayton (F)	Nicholas Van Dyke (F)	Louis McLane (F)	Jackson/ Calhoun (DR) ✗
1825	Samuel Paynter (F)	James Rogers	William W. Green		5F, 4DR	13F, 8DR	Thomas Clayton (NR)	Nicholas Van Dyke (NR)	Louis McLane (J)	Jackson/ Calhoun (DR) ✗
1826	Samuel Paynter (F)	James Rogers	William W. Green		5F, 4DR	14DR, 7F	Thomas Clayton (NR)	Daniel Rodney (NR)	Louis McLane (J)	Jackson/ Calhoun (DR) ✗
1827	Charles Polk Jr. (F)	James Rogers	Ezekiel Cowgill		5DR, 4F	13F, 8DR	Louis McLane (J)	Henry M. Ridgely (J)	vacant	Jackson/ Calhoun (DR) ✗
1828	Charles Polk Jr. (F)	James Rogers	Ezekiel Cowgill		5A-J, 3J, 1?	11A-J, 10J	Louis McLane (J)	Henry M. Ridgely (J)	Kensey Johns Jr. (NR)	Adams/ Rush (NR) ✗
1829	Charles Polk Jr. (F)	James Rogers	Ezekiel Cowgill		5NR, 4D	14NR, 7D	vacant	John M. Clayton (NR)	Kensey Johns Jr. (NR)	Adams/ Rush (NR) ✗
1830	David Hazzard (NR)	Robert Frame	Cornelius P. Comegys (NR)		5NR, 4D	14NR, 7D	Arnold Naudain (NR)	John M. Clayton (NR)	Kensey Johns Jr. (NR)	Adams/ Rush (NR) ✗
1831	David Hazzard (NR)	Robert Frame	Cornelius P. Comegys (NR)		7NR, 2D	16NR, 5D	Arnold Naudain (NR)	John M. Clayton (NR)	John J. Milligan (NR)	Adams/ Rush (NR) ✗
1832	David Hazzard (NR)	Robert Frame	Cornelius P. Comegys (NR)		7NR, 2D	14NR, 7D	Arnold Naudain (NR)	John M. Clayton (NR)	John J. Milligan (NR)	Clay/ Sergeant (NR) ✗
1833	Caleb P. Bennett (D)	Robert Frame	Cornelius P. Comegys (NR)		7NR, 2D	14NR, 7D	Arnold Naudain (NR)	John M. Clayton (NR)	John J. Milligan (NR)	Clay/ Sergeant (NR) ✗
1834	Caleb P. Bennett (D)	Robert Frame	Cornelius P. Comegys (NR)		7NR, 2D	14NR, 7D	Arnold Naudain (NR)	John M. Clayton (NR)	John J. Milligan (NR)	Clay/ Sergeant (NR) ✗
1835	Caleb P. Bennett (D)	James Rogers	Peter S. Parker		6W, 3D	14W, 7D	Arnold Naudain (NR)	John M. Clayton (NR)	John J. Milligan (NR)	Clay/ Sergeant (NR) ✗
1836	Caleb P. Bennett (D)	James Rogers	Peter S. Parker		6W, 3D	14W, 7D	Arnold Naudain (NR)	John M. Clayton (NR)	John J. Milligan (NR)	Harrison/ Granger (W) ✗
1836	Charles Polk Jr. (W)	James Rogers	Peter S. Parker		6W, 3D	14W, 7D	Richard H. Bayard (NR)	Thomas Clayton (NR)	John J. Milligan (NR)	Harrison/ Granger (W) ✗
1837	Cornelius P. Comegys (W)	James Rogers	Peter S. Parker		6W, 3D	14W, 7D	Richard H. Bayard (W)	Thomas Clayton (W)	John J. Milligan (W)	Harrison/ Granger (W) ✗
1838	Cornelius P. Comegys (W)	James Rogers	Peter S. Parker		6W, 3D	14W, 7D	Richard H. Bayard (W)	Thomas Clayton (W)	John J. Milligan (W)	Harrison/ Granger (W) ✗
1839	Cornelius P. Comegys (W)	James Rogers	Elijah Cannon		6D, 3W	13D, 8W	Richard H. Bayard (W)	Thomas Clayton (W)	Thomas Robinson Jr. (D)	Harrison/ Granger (W) ✗
1840	Cornelius P. Comegys (W)	Edward W. Gilpin	Elijah Cannon		6D, 3W	13D, 8W	vacant	Thomas Clayton (W)	Thomas Robinson Jr. (D)	Harrison/ Tyler (W) ✓
1841	William B. Cooper (W)	Edward W. Gilpin	William D. Waples (W)	J. L. Harper	5D, 4W	21W	Richard H. Bayard (W)	Thomas Clayton (W)	George B. Rodney (W)	Harrison/ Tyler (W) ✓
1842	William B. Cooper (W)	Edward W. Gilpin	Gardner H. Wright		5D, 4W	21W	Richard H. Bayard (W)	Thomas Clayton (W)	George B. Rodney (W)	Harrison/ Tyler (W) ✓
1843	William B. Cooper (W)	Edward W. Gilpin	Gardner H. Wright		7W, 2D	14W, 7D	Richard H. Bayard (W)	Thomas Clayton (W)	George B. Rodney (W)	Harrison/ Tyler (W) ✓
1844	William B. Cooper (W)	Edward W. Gilpin	Gardner H. Wright		7W, 2D	14W, 7D	Richard H. Bayard (W)	Thomas Clayton (W)	George B. Rodney (W)	Clay/ Frelinghuysen (W) ✗
1845	Thomas Stockton (W)	Edward W. Gilpin	James S. Buckmaster		7W, 2D	6W, 3D	John M. Clayton (W) (Note: Resigned to become United States Secretary of State.)	Thomas Clayton (W)	John W. Houston (W)	Clay/ Frelinghuysen (W) ✗
1846	Thomas Stockton (W)	Edward W. Gilpin	James S. Buckmaster		7W, 2D	6W, 3D	John M. Clayton (W)	Thomas Clayton (W)	John W. Houston (W)	Clay/ Frelinghuysen (W) ✗
1846	Joseph Maull (W)	Edward W. Gilpin	James S. Buckmaster		7W, 2D	6W, 3D	John M. Clayton (W)	Thomas Clayton (W)	John W. Houston (W)	Clay/ Frelinghuysen (W) ✗
1846	William Temple (W)	Edward W. Gilpin	James S. Buckmaster		7W, 2D	6W, 3D	John M. Clayton (W)	Thomas Clayton (W)	John W. Houston (W)	Clay/ Frelinghuysen (W) ✗
1847	William Tharp (D)	Edward W. Gilpin	James S. Buckmaster	Abraham Staats	5W, 4D	11W, 10D	John M. Clayton (W)	Presley Spruance (W)	John W. Houston (W)	Clay/ Frelinghuysen (W) ✗
1848	William Tharp (D)	Edward W. Gilpin	James S. Buckmaster	Abraham Staats	5W, 4D	11W, 10D	John M. Clayton (W)	Presley Spruance (W)	John W. Houston (W)	Taylor/ Fillmore (W) ✓
1849	William Tharp (D)	Edward W. Gilpin	Jacob Faris (W)	Hiram W. McColley	6W, 3D	13W, 7D, 1?	John Wales (W)	Presley Spruance (W)	John W. Houston (W)	Taylor/ Fillmore (W) ✓
1850	William Tharp (D)	Willard Saulsbury Sr. (D)	Jacob Faris (W)	Hiram W. McColley	6W, 3D	13W, 7D, 1?	John Wales (W)	Presley Spruance (W)	John W. Houston (W)	Taylor/ Fillmore (W) ✓
1851	William H. H. Ross (D)	Willard Saulsbury Sr. (D)	William Cannon (D)	Luther Swigget	5D, 4W	14D, 7W	James A. Bayard Jr. (D)	Presley Spruance (W)	George R. Riddle (D)	Taylor/ Fillmore (W) ✓
1852	William H. H. Ross (D)	Willard Saulsbury Sr. (D)	William Cannon (D)	Luther Swigget	5D, 4W	14D, 7W	James A. Bayard Jr. (D)	Presley Spruance (W)	George R. Riddle (D)	Pierce/ King (D) ✓
1853	William H. H. Ross (D)	Willard Saulsbury Sr. (D)	William Cannon (D)	Luther Swigget	5D, 4W	13W, 8D	James A. Bayard Jr. (D)	John M. Clayton (W)	George R. Riddle (D)	Pierce/ King (D) ✓
1854	William H. H. Ross (D)	Willard Saulsbury Sr. (D)	William Cannon (D)	Luther Swigget	5D, 4W	13W, 8D	James A. Bayard Jr. (D)	John M. Clayton (W)	George R. Riddle (D)	Pierce/ King (D) ✓
1855	Peter F. Causey (KN)	George P. Fisher (R)	John R. Sudler	William T. Alrichs	6KN, 2D, 1W	19KN, 2D	James A. Bayard Jr. (D)	John M. Clayton (W)	Elisha D. Cullen (KN)	Pierce/ King (D) ✓
1856	Peter F. Causey (KN)	George P. Fisher (R)	John R. Sudler	William T. Alrichs	6KN, 2D, 1W	19KN, 2D	James A. Bayard Jr. (D)	John M. Clayton (W)	Elisha D. Cullen (KN)	Buchanan/ Breckinridge (D) ✓
1857	Peter F. Causey (KN)	George P. Fisher (R)	William J. Clarke		5D, 4O	21D	James A. Bayard Jr. (D)	Joseph P. Comegys (W)	William G. Whiteley (D)	Buchanan/ Breckinridge (D) ✓
1858	Peter F. Causey (KN)	George P. Fisher (R)	William J. Clarke		5D, 4O	21D	James A. Bayard Jr. (D)	Joseph P. Comegys (W)	William G. Whiteley (D)	Buchanan/ Breckinridge (D) ✓
1859	William Burton (D)	George P. Fisher (R)	William J. Clarke	Aaron B. Marvel	7D, 2O	14D, 7O	James A. Bayard Jr. (D)	Willard Saulsbury Sr. (D)	William G. Whiteley (D)	Buchanan/ Breckinridge (D) ✓
1860	William Burton (D)	Alfred Wooten	William J. Clarke	Aaron B. Marvel	7D, 2O	14D, 7O	James A. Bayard Jr. (D)	Willard Saulsbury Sr. (D)	William G. Whiteley (D)	Breckinridge/ Lane (SD) ✗
1861	William Burton (D)	Alfred Wooten	Samuel B. Hitch	W. N. Hamilton	5D, 4R	11R, 10D	James A. Bayard Jr. (D)	Willard Saulsbury Sr. (D)	George P. Fisher (U)	Breckinridge/ Lane (SD) ✗
1862	William Burton (D)	Alfred Wooten	Samuel B. Hitch	W. N. Hamilton	5D, 4R	11R, 10D	James A. Bayard Jr. (D)	Willard Saulsbury Sr. (D)	George P. Fisher (U)	Breckinridge/ Lane (SD) ✗
1863	William Cannon (R)	Alfred Wooten	Locksley R. Jacobs	Andrew J. Calley	5D, 4R	14D, 7R	James A. Bayard Jr. (D)	Willard Saulsbury Sr. (D)	William Temple (D)	Breckinridge/ Lane (SD) ✗
1864	William Cannon (R)	Jacob Moore (R)	Locksley R. Jacobs	Andrew J. Calley	5D, 4R	14D, 7R	George R. Riddle (D)	Willard Saulsbury Sr. (D)	Nathaniel B. Smithers (R)	McClellan/ Pendleton (D) ✗
1865	William Cannon (R)	Jacob Moore (R)	Lewellyn Thorp	Robert G. Ellegood	6D, 3R	14D, 7R	George R. Riddle (D)	Willard Saulsbury Sr. (D)	John A. Nicholson (D)	McClellan/ Pendleton (D) ✗
1865	Gove Saulsbury (D) (Note: Assumed office upon the death of Cannon, then was elected to office in his own right.)	Jacob Moore (R)	Lewellyn Thorp	Robert G. Ellegood	6D, 3R	14D, 7R	George R. Riddle (D)	Willard Saulsbury Sr. (D)	John A. Nicholson (D)	McClellan/ Pendleton (D) ✗
1866	Gove Saulsbury (D)	Jacob Moore (R)	Lewellyn Thorp	Robert G. Ellegood	6D, 3R	14D, 7R	George R. Riddle (D)	Willard Saulsbury Sr. (D)	John A. Nicholson (D)	McClellan/ Pendleton (D) ✗
1867	Gove Saulsbury (D)	Jacob Moore (R)	William J. Clarke	Robert Lambden	6D, 3R	15D, 6R	James A. Bayard Jr. (D)	Willard Saulsbury Sr. (D)	John A. Nicholson (D)	McClellan/ Pendleton (D) ✗
1868	Gove Saulsbury (D)	Jacob Moore (R)	William J. Clarke	Robert Lambden	6D, 3R	15D, 6R	James A. Bayard Jr. (D)	Willard Saulsbury Sr. (D)	John A. Nicholson (D)	Seymour/ Blair (D) ✗
1869	Gove Saulsbury (D)	Charles B. Lore (D)	William J. Clarke	Robert Lambden	9D	21D	Thomas F. Bayard (D)	Willard Saulsbury Sr. (D)	Benjamin T. Biggs (D)	Seymour/ Blair (D) ✗
1870	Gove Saulsbury (D)	Charles B. Lore (D)	William J. Clarke	Robert Lambden	9D	21D	Thomas F. Bayard (D)	Willard Saulsbury Sr. (D)	Benjamin T. Biggs (D)	Seymour/ Blair (D) ✗
1871	James Ponder (D)	Charles B. Lore (D)	Robert H. Davis	Robert G. Ellegood	9D	21D	Thomas F. Bayard (D)	Eli Saulsbury (D)	Benjamin T. Biggs (D)	Seymour/ Blair (D) ✗
1872	James Ponder (D)	Charles B. Lore (D)	Robert H. Davis	Robert G. Ellegood	9D	21D	Thomas F. Bayard (D)	Eli Saulsbury (D)	Benjamin T. Biggs (D)	Grant/ Wilson (R) ✓
1873	James Ponder (D)	Charles B. Lore (D)	Robert H. Davis	Robert G. Ellegood	8D, 1R	21D	Thomas F. Bayard (D)	Eli Saulsbury (D)	James R. Lofland (R)	Grant/ Wilson (R) ✓
1874	James Ponder (D)	John B. Penington (D)	Robert H. Davis	Robert G. Ellegood	8D, 1R	21D	Thomas F. Bayard (D)	Eli Saulsbury (D)	James R. Lofland (R)	Grant/ Wilson (R) ✓
1875	John P. Cochran (D)	John B. Penington (D)	Thomas B. Giles	Nathan Pratt (D)	8D, 1R	21D	Thomas F. Bayard (D)	Eli Saulsbury (D)	James Williams (D)	Grant/ Wilson (R) ✓
1876	John P. Cochran (D)	John B. Penington (D)	Thomas B. Giles	Nathan Pratt (D)	8D, 1R	21D	Thomas F. Bayard (D)	Eli Saulsbury (D)	James Williams (D)	Tilden/ Hendricks (D) ✗
1877	John P. Cochran (D)	John B. Penington (D)	Thomas B. Giles	Nathan Pratt (D)	9D	21D	Thomas F. Bayard (D)	Eli Saulsbury (D)	James Williams (D)	Tilden/ Hendricks (D) ✗
1878	John P. Cochran (D)	John B. Penington (D)	Thomas B. Giles	Nathan Pratt (D)	9D	21D	Thomas F. Bayard (D)	Eli Saulsbury (D)	James Williams (D)	Tilden/ Hendricks (D) ✗
1879	John W. Hall (D)	George Gray (D)	Robert J. Reynolds (D)	John F. Staats	9D	21D	Thomas F. Bayard (D)	Eli Saulsbury (D)	Edward L. Martin (D)	Tilden/ Hendricks (D) ✗
1880	John W. Hall (D)	George Gray (D)	Robert J. Reynolds (D)	John F. Staats	9D	21D	Thomas F. Bayard (D)	Eli Saulsbury (D)	Edward L. Martin (D)	Hancock/ English (D) ✗
1881	John W. Hall (D)	George Gray (D)	Robert J. Reynolds (D)	John F. Staats	8D, 1R	14D, 7R	Thomas F. Bayard (D)	Eli Saulsbury (D)	Edward L. Martin (D)	Hancock/ English (D) ✗
1882	John W. Hall (D)	George Gray (D)	Robert J. Reynolds (D)	John F. Staats	8D, 1R	14D, 7R	Thomas F. Bayard (D)	Eli Saulsbury (D)	Edward L. Martin (D)	Hancock/ English (D) ✗
1883	Charles C. Stockley (D)	George Gray (D)	John M. Houston (D)	Jesse L. Long	7D, 2R	21D	Thomas F. Bayard (D)	Eli Saulsbury (D)	Charles B. Lore (D)	Hancock/ English (D) ✗
1884	Charles C. Stockley (D)	George Gray (D)	John M. Houston (D)	Jesse L. Long	7D, 2R	21D	Thomas F. Bayard (D)	Eli Saulsbury (D)	Charles B. Lore (D)	Cleveland/ Hendricks (D) ✓
1885	Charles C. Stockley (D)	John H. Paynter	John M. Houston (D)	Jesse L. Long	9D	21D	George Gray (D)	Eli Saulsbury (D)	Charles B. Lore (D)	Cleveland/ Hendricks (D) ✓
1886	Charles C. Stockley (D)	John H. Paynter	John M. Houston (D)	Jesse L. Long	9D	21D	George Gray (D)	Eli Saulsbury (D)	Charles B. Lore (D)	Cleveland/ Hendricks (D) ✓
1887	Benjamin T. Biggs (D)	John Biggs	William Herbert	James H. Boyce	9D	21D	George Gray (D)	Eli Saulsbury (D)	John B. Penington (D)	Cleveland/ Hendricks (D) ✓
1888	Benjamin T. Biggs (D)	John Biggs	William Herbert	James H. Boyce	9D	21D	George Gray (D)	Eli Saulsbury (D)	John B. Penington (D)	Cleveland/ Thurman (D) ✗
1889	Benjamin T. Biggs (D)	John Biggs	William Herbert	James H. Boyce	5R, 4D	14R, 7D	George Gray (D)	Anthony Higgins (R)	John B. Penington (D)	Cleveland/ Thurman (D) ✗
1890	Benjamin T. Biggs (D)	John Biggs	William Herbert	James H. Boyce	5R, 4D	14R, 7D	George Gray (D)	Anthony Higgins (R)	John B. Penington (D)	Cleveland/ Thurman (D) ✗
1891	Robert J. Reynolds (D)	John Biggs	Wilbur H. Burnite	John P. Dulaney	7D, 2R	14R, 7D	George Gray (D)	Anthony Higgins (R)	John W. Causey (D)	Cleveland/ Thurman (D) ✗
1892	Robert J. Reynolds (D)	John R. Nicholson	Wilbur H. Burnite	John P. Dulaney	7D, 2R	14R, 7D	George Gray (D)	Anthony Higgins (R)	John W. Causey (D)	Cleveland/ Stevenson (D) ✓
1893	Robert J. Reynolds (D)	John R. Nicholson	Wilbur H. Burnite	John P. Dulaney	5D, 4R	21D	George Gray (D)	Anthony Higgins (R)	John W. Causey (D)	Cleveland/ Stevenson (D) ✓
1894	Robert J. Reynolds (D)	John R. Nicholson	Wilbur H. Burnite	John P. Dulaney	5D, 4R	21D	George Gray (D)	Anthony Higgins (R)	John W. Causey (D)	Cleveland/ Stevenson (D) ✓
1895	Joshua H. Marvil (R)	Robert C. White	Charles H. Atkins	Beniah L. Lewis	5D, 4R	15R, 6D	George Gray (D)	vacant	Jonathan S. Willis (R)	Cleveland/ Stevenson (D) ✓
1895	William T. Watson (D)	Robert C. White	Charles H. Atkins	Beniah L. Lewis	5D, 4R	15R, 6D	George Gray (D)	vacant	Jonathan S. Willis (R)	Cleveland/ Stevenson (D) ✓
1896	William T. Watson (D)	Robert C. White	Charles H. Atkins	Beniah L. Lewis	5D, 4R	15R, 6D	George Gray (D)	vacant	Jonathan S. Willis (R)	McKinley/ Hobart (R) ✓
1897	Ebe W. Tunnell (D)	Robert C. White	William M. Ross (D)	Beniah L. Lewis	5D, 4R	20D, 1R	George Gray (D)	Richard R. Kenney (D)	L. Irving Handy (D)	McKinley/ Hobart (R) ✓
1898	Ebe W. Tunnell (D)	Robert C. White	William M. Ross (D)	Beniah L. Lewis	5D, 4R	20D, 1R	George Gray (D)	Richard R. Kenney (D)	L. Irving Handy (D)	McKinley/ Hobart (R) ✓
1899	Ebe W. Tunnell (D)	Robert C. White	L. Heisler Ball (R)	John A. Lingo (R)	9D, 8R	22R, 13D	vacant	Richard R. Kenney (D)	John H. Hoffecker (R)	McKinley/ Hobart (R) ✓
1900	Ebe W. Tunnell (D)	Robert C. White	L. Heisler Ball (R)	Isaac N. Fooks	9D, 8R	22R, 13D	vacant	Richard R. Kenney (D)	John H. Hoffecker (R)	McKinley/ Roosevelt (R) ✓
1900	Ebe W. Tunnell (D)	Robert C. White	L. Heisler Ball (R)	Isaac N. Fooks	9D, 8R	22R, 13D	vacant	Richard R. Kenney (D)	Walter O. Hoffecker (R)	McKinley/ Roosevelt (R) ✓

== 1901–present ==
Year	Executive offices						General Assembly		United States Congress			Electoral votes
Year	Governor	Lt. Governor	Attorney General	Treasurer	Auditor	Insurance Commissioner	State Senate	State House	U.S. Senator (Class I)	U.S. Senator (Class II)	U.S. House	Electoral votes
1901	John Hunn (R)	Philip L. Cannon (R)	Herbert H. Ward (R)	Martin B. Burris (R)	Purnal B. Norman (R)	George W. Marshall (R)	9R, 8D	20R, 15D	vacant	vacant	L. Heisler Ball (R)	
1902	John Hunn (R)	Philip L. Cannon (R)	Herbert H. Ward (R)	Martin B. Burris (R)	Purnal B. Norman (R)	George W. Marshall (R)	9R, 8D	20R, 15D	vacant	vacant	L. Heisler Ball (R)	
1903	John Hunn (R)	Philip L. Cannon (R)	Herbert H. Ward (R)	Martin B. Burris (R)	Purnal B. Norman (R)	George W. Marshall (R)	10R, 7D	20R, 15D	L. Heisler Ball (R)	J. Frank Allee (R)	Henry A. Houston (D)	
1904	John Hunn (R)	Philip L. Cannon (R)	Herbert H. Ward (R)	Martin B. Burris (R)	Purnal B. Norman (R)	George W. Marshall (R)	10R, 7D	20R, 15D	L. Heisler Ball (R)	J. Frank Allee (R)	Henry A. Houston (D)	Roosevelt/ Fairbanks (R) ✓
1905	Preston Lea (R)	Isaac T. Parker (R)	Robert H. Richards (R)	Thomas N. Rawlins (R)	George H. Dick (R)	George W. Marshall (R)	10R, 7D	21R, 14D	vacant	J. Frank Allee (R)	Hiram R. Burton (R)	Roosevelt/ Fairbanks (R) ✓
1906	Preston Lea (R)	Isaac T. Parker (R)	Robert H. Richards (R)	Thomas N. Rawlins (R)	George H. Dick (R)	George W. Marshall (R)	10R, 7D	21R, 14D	vacant	J. Frank Allee (R)	Hiram R. Burton (R)	Roosevelt/ Fairbanks (R) ✓
1907	Preston Lea (R)	Isaac T. Parker (R)	Robert H. Richards (R)	Thomas N. Rawlins (R)	Thomas C. Roe (R)	George W. Marshall (R)	11R, 6D	25R, 10D	Henry A. du Pont (R)	Harry A. Richardson (R)	Hiram R. Burton (R)	Roosevelt/ Fairbanks (R) ✓
1908	Preston Lea (R)	Isaac T. Parker (R)	Robert H. Richards (R)	Thomas N. Rawlins (R)	Thomas C. Roe (R)	George W. Marshall (R)	11R, 6D	25R, 10D	Henry A. du Pont (R)	Harry A. Richardson (R)	Hiram R. Burton (R)	Taft/ Sherman (R) ✓
1909	Simeon S. Pennewill (R)	John M. Mendinhall (R)	Andrew C. Gray (D)	David O. Moore (R)	Theodore F. Clark (R)	Charles H. Maull (R)	11R, 6D	18D, 17R	Henry A. du Pont (R)	Harry A. Richardson (R)	William H. Heald (R)	Taft/ Sherman (R) ✓
1910	Simeon S. Pennewill (R)	John M. Mendinhall (R)	Andrew C. Gray (D)	David O. Moore (R)	Theodore F. Clark (R)	Charles H. Maull (R)	11R, 6D	18D, 17R	Henry A. du Pont (R)	Harry A. Richardson (R)	William H. Heald (R)	Taft/ Sherman (R) ✓
1911	Simeon S. Pennewill (R)	John M. Mendinhall (R)	Andrew C. Gray (D)	David O. Moore (R)	Theodore F. Clark (R)	Charles H. Maull (R)	9R, 8D	22R, 13D	Henry A. du Pont (R)	Harry A. Richardson (R)	William H. Heald (R)	Taft/ Sherman (R) ✓
1912	Simeon S. Pennewill (R)	John M. Mendinhall (R)	Andrew C. Gray (D)	David O. Moore (R)	Theodore F. Clark (R)	Charles H. Maull (R)	9R, 8D	22R, 13D	Henry A. du Pont (R)	Harry A. Richardson (R)	William H. Heald (R)	Wilson/ Marshall (D) ✓
1913	Charles R. Miller (R)	Colen Ferguson (D)	Josiah O. Wolcott (D)	Charles A. Hastings (D)	Walter Poole Prettyman (D)	William R. McGabe (D)	9R, 8D	21D, 14R	Henry A. du Pont (R)	Willard Saulsbury Jr. (D)	Franklin Brockson (D)	Wilson/ Marshall (D) ✓
1914	Charles R. Miller (R)	Colen Ferguson (D)	Josiah O. Wolcott (D)	Charles A. Hastings (D)	Walter Poole Prettyman (D)	William R. McGabe (D)	9R, 8D	21D, 14R	Henry A. du Pont (R)	Willard Saulsbury Jr. (D)	Franklin Brockson (D)	Wilson/ Marshall (D) ✓
1915	Charles R. Miller (R)	Colen Ferguson (D)	Josiah O. Wolcott (D)	William J. Swain (R)	Charles J. Luff (R)	William R. McGabe (D)	9R, 8D	19R, 16D	Henry A. du Pont (R)	Willard Saulsbury Jr. (D)	Thomas W. Miller (R)	Wilson/ Marshall (D) ✓
1916	Charles R. Miller (R)	Colen Ferguson (D)	Josiah O. Wolcott (D)	William J. Swain (R)	Charles J. Luff (R)	William R. McGabe (D)	9R, 8D	19R, 16D	Henry A. du Pont (R)	Willard Saulsbury Jr. (D)	Thomas W. Miller (R)	Hughes/ Fairbanks (R) ✗
1917	John G. Townsend Jr. (R)	Lewis E. Eliason (D)	David J. Reinhardt (R)	William J. Swain (R)	William G. Roe (D)	Thomas R. Wilson (D)	10R, 7D	19D, 16R	Josiah O. Wolcott (D) (Note: Resigned to become Chancellor of the Delaware Court of Chancery.)	Willard Saulsbury Jr. (D)	Albert F. Polk (D)	Hughes/ Fairbanks (R) ✗
1918	John G. Townsend Jr. (R)	Lewis E. Eliason (D)	David J. Reinhardt (R)	William J. Swain (R)	William G. Roe (D)	Thomas R. Wilson (D)	10R, 7D	19D, 16R	Josiah O. Wolcott (D)	Willard Saulsbury Jr. (D)	Albert F. Polk (D)	Hughes/ Fairbanks (R) ✗
1919	John G. Townsend Jr. (R)	Lewis E. Eliason (D)	David J. Reinhardt (R)	George M. Fisher (R)	Daniel Thompson (R)	Thomas R. Wilson (D)	10R, 7D	23R, 12D	Josiah O. Wolcott (D)	L. Heisler Ball (R)	Caleb R. Layton (R)	Hughes/ Fairbanks (R) ✗
1920	John G. Townsend Jr. (R)	Lewis E. Eliason (D)	David J. Reinhardt (R)	George M. Fisher (R)	Daniel Thompson (R)	Thomas R. Wilson (D)	10R, 7D	23R, 12D	Josiah O. Wolcott (D)	L. Heisler Ball (R)	Caleb R. Layton (R)	Harding/ Coolidge (R) ✓
1921	William D. Denney (R)	J. Danforth Bush (R)	Sylvester D. Townsend Jr. (R)	George M. Fisher (R)	Daniel Thompson (R)	Horace Sudler (R)	12R, 5D	18D, 17R	T. Coleman du Pont (R) (Note: Appointed to fill vacancy.)	L. Heisler Ball (R)	Caleb R. Layton (R)	Harding/ Coolidge (R) ✓
1922	William D. Denney (R)	J. Danforth Bush (R)	Sylvester D. Townsend Jr. (R)	George M. Fisher (R)	Daniel Thompson (R)	Horace Sudler (R)	12R, 5D	18D, 17R	T. Coleman du Pont (R)	L. Heisler Ball (R)	Caleb R. Layton (R)	Harding/ Coolidge (R) ✓
1923	William D. Denney (R)	J. Danforth Bush (R)	Sylvester D. Townsend Jr. (R)	Thomas S. Fouracre (R)	Joseph Morris Harrington (R)	Charles M. Hollis (R)	11R, 6D	18D, 17R	Thomas F. Bayard Jr. (D)	L. Heisler Ball (R)	William H. Boyce (D)	Harding/ Coolidge (R) ✓
1924	William D. Denney (R)	J. Danforth Bush (R)	Sylvester D. Townsend Jr. (R)	Thomas S. Fouracre (R)	Joseph Morris Harrington (R)	Charles M. Hollis (R)	11R, 6D	18D, 17R	Thomas F. Bayard Jr. (D)	L. Heisler Ball (R)	William H. Boyce (D)	Coolidge/ Dawes (R) ✓
1925	Robert P. Robinson (R)	James H. Anderson (R)	Clarence A. Southerland (R)	Thomas S. Fouracre (R)	Joseph Morris Harrington (R)	James G. Shaw (R)	9D, 8R	22R, 13D	Thomas F. Bayard Jr. (D)	T. Coleman du Pont (R) (Note: Resigned due to poor health.)	Robert G. Houston (R)	Coolidge/ Dawes (R) ✓
1926	Robert P. Robinson (R)	James H. Anderson (R)	Clarence A. Southerland (R)	Thomas S. Fouracre (R)	Joseph Morris Harrington (R)	James G. Shaw (R)	9D, 8R	22R, 13D	Thomas F. Bayard Jr. (D)	T. Coleman du Pont (R)	Robert G. Houston (R)	Coolidge/ Dawes (R) ✓
1927	Robert P. Robinson (R)	James H. Anderson (R)	Clarence A. Southerland (R)	Howard M. Ward (R)	Edward Baker (R)	James G. Shaw (R)	9D, 8R	18R, 17D	Thomas F. Bayard Jr. (D)	T. Coleman du Pont (R)	Robert G. Houston (R)	Coolidge/ Dawes (R) ✓
1928	Robert P. Robinson (R)	James H. Anderson (R)	Clarence A. Southerland (R)	Howard M. Ward (R)	Edward Baker (R)	James G. Shaw (R)	9D, 8R	18R, 17D	Thomas F. Bayard Jr. (D)	T. Coleman du Pont (R)	Robert G. Houston (R)	Hoover/ Curtis (R) ✓
1929	C. Douglass Buck (R)	James H. Hazel (R)	Reuben Satterthwaite Jr. (R)	Howard M. Ward (R)	Edward Baker (R)	James G. Shaw (R)	9R, 8D	26R, 9D	John G. Townsend Jr. (R)	Daniel O. Hastings (R)	Robert G. Houston (R)	Hoover/ Curtis (R) ✓
1930	C. Douglass Buck (R)	James H. Hazel (R)	Reuben Satterthwaite Jr. (R)	Howard M. Ward (R)	Edward Baker (R)	James G. Shaw (R)	9R, 8D	26R, 9D	John G. Townsend Jr. (R)	Daniel O. Hastings (R)	Robert G. Houston (R)	Hoover/ Curtis (R) ✓
1931	C. Douglass Buck (R)	James H. Hazel (R)	Reuben Satterthwaite Jr. (R)	George S. Williams (R)	Edward Baker (R)	James G. Shaw (R)	12R, 5D	22R, 13D	John G. Townsend Jr. (R)	Daniel O. Hastings (R)	Robert G. Houston (R)	Hoover/ Curtis (R) ✓
1932	C. Douglass Buck (R)	James H. Hazel (R)	Reuben Satterthwaite Jr. (R)	George S. Williams (R)	Edward Baker (R)	James G. Shaw (R)	12R, 5D	22R, 13D	John G. Townsend Jr. (R)	Daniel O. Hastings (R)	Robert G. Houston (R)	Hoover/ Curtis (R) ✗
1933	C. Douglass Buck (R)	Roy F. Corley (R)	Daniel J. Layton (R)	George S. Williams (R)	James H. Hazel (R)	James G. Shaw (R)	9R, 8D	22D, 13R	John G. Townsend Jr. (R)	Daniel O. Hastings (R)	Wilbur L. Adams (D)	Hoover/ Curtis (R) ✗
1933	C. Douglass Buck (R)	Roy F. Corley (R)	P. Warren Green (R)	George S. Williams (R)	James H. Hazel (R)	James G. Shaw (R)	9R, 8D	22D, 13R	John G. Townsend Jr. (R)	Daniel O. Hastings (R)	Wilbur L. Adams (D)	Hoover/ Curtis (R) ✗
1934	C. Douglass Buck (R)	Roy F. Corley (R)	P. Warren Green (R)	George S. Williams (R)	James H. Hazel (R)	James G. Shaw (R)	9R, 8D	22D, 13R	John G. Townsend Jr. (R)	Daniel O. Hastings (R)	Wilbur L. Adams (D)	Hoover/ Curtis (R) ✗
1935	C. Douglass Buck (R)	Roy F. Corley (R)	P. Warren Green (R)	Warren T. Moore (R)	James H. Hazel (R)	James Postles Hammond (R)	10R, 7D	23R, 12D	John G. Townsend Jr. (R)	Daniel O. Hastings (R)	J. George Stewart (R)	Hoover/ Curtis (R) ✗
1936	C. Douglass Buck (R)	Roy F. Corley (R)	P. Warren Green (R)	Warren T. Moore (R)	James H. Hazel (R)	James Postles Hammond (R)	10R, 7D	23R, 12D	John G. Townsend Jr. (R)	Daniel O. Hastings (R)	J. George Stewart (R)	Roosevelt/ Garner (D) ✓
1937	Richard McMullen (D)	Edward W. Cooch (D)	P. Warren Green (R)	Ernest C. Blackstone (D)	James W. Wise (D)	James Postles Hammond (R)	11R, 6D	21D, 14R	John G. Townsend Jr. (R)	James H. Hughes (D)	William F. Allen (D)	Roosevelt/ Garner (D) ✓
1938	Richard McMullen (D)	Edward W. Cooch (D)	P. Warren Green (R)	Ernest C. Blackstone (D)	James W. Wise (D)	James Postles Hammond (R)	11R, 6D	21D, 14R	John G. Townsend Jr. (R)	James H. Hughes (D)	William F. Allen (D)	Roosevelt/ Garner (D) ✓
1939	Richard McMullen (D)	Edward W. Cooch (D)	James R. Morford (R)	Fagan H. Simonton (R)	Benjamin I. Shaw (R)	William J. Swain (R)	11R, 6D	20R, 15D	John G. Townsend Jr. (R)	James H. Hughes (D)	George S. Williams (R)	Roosevelt/ Garner (D) ✓
1940	Richard McMullen (D)	Edward W. Cooch (D)	James R. Morford (R)	Fagan H. Simonton (R)	Benjamin I. Shaw (R)	William J. Swain (R)	11R, 6D	20R, 15D	John G. Townsend Jr. (R)	James H. Hughes (D)	George S. Williams (R)	Roosevelt/ Wallace (D) ✓
1941	Walter W. Bacon (R)	Isaac J. MacCollum (D)	James R. Morford (R)	Peter S. Collins (D)	Harrison M. Manning (D)	William J. Swain (R)	10R, 7D	20R, 15D	James M. Tunnell (D)	James H. Hughes (D)	Philip A. Traynor (D)	Roosevelt/ Wallace (D) ✓
1942	Walter W. Bacon (R)	Isaac J. MacCollum (D)	James R. Morford (R)	Peter S. Collins (D)	Harrison M. Manning (D)	William J. Swain (R)	10R, 7D	20R, 15D	James M. Tunnell (D)	James H. Hughes (D)	Philip A. Traynor (D)	Roosevelt/ Wallace (D) ✓
1943	Walter W. Bacon (R)	Isaac J. MacCollum (D)	Clair J. Killoran (R)	John S. Isaacs (R)	Joseph M. Harrington (R)	William J. Swain (R)	10R, 7D	24R, 11D	James M. Tunnell (D)	C. Douglass Buck (R)	Earle D. Willey (R)	Roosevelt/ Wallace (D) ✓
1944	Walter W. Bacon (R)	Isaac J. MacCollum (D)	Clair J. Killoran (R)	John S. Isaacs (R)	Joseph M. Harrington (R)	William J. Swain (R)	10R, 7D	24R, 11D	James M. Tunnell (D)	C. Douglass Buck (R)	Earle D. Willey (R)	Roosevelt/ Truman (D) ✓
1945	Walter W. Bacon (R)	Elbert N. Carvel (D)	Clair J. Killoran (R)	Jesse S. Cooper Jr. (D)	Wilbur E. Jacobs (D)	William J. Swain (R)	11R, 6D	22R, 13D	James M. Tunnell (D)	C. Douglass Buck (R)	Philip A. Traynor (D)	Roosevelt/ Truman (D) ✓
1946	Walter W. Bacon (R)	Elbert N. Carvel (D)	Clair J. Killoran (R)	Jesse S. Cooper Jr. (D)	Wilbur E. Jacobs (D)	William J. Swain (R)	11R, 6D	22R, 13D	James M. Tunnell (D)	C. Douglass Buck (R)	Philip A. Traynor (D)	Roosevelt/ Truman (D) ✓
1947	Walter W. Bacon (R)	Elbert N. Carvel (D)	Albert W. James (R)	Benjamin F. Johnson (R)	Benjamin I. Shaw (R)	William J. Swain (R)	11R, 6D	24R, 11D	John J. Williams (R)	C. Douglass Buck (R)	J. Caleb Boggs (R)	Roosevelt/ Truman (D) ✓
1948	Walter W. Bacon (R)	Elbert N. Carvel (D)	Albert W. James (R)	Benjamin F. Johnson (R)	Benjamin I. Shaw (R)	William J. Swain (R)	11R, 6D	24R, 11D	John J. Williams (R)	C. Douglass Buck (R)	J. Caleb Boggs (R)	Dewey/ Warren (R) ✗
1949	Elbert N. Carvel (D)	Alexis I. du Pont Bayard (D)	Albert W. James (R)	Willard D. Boyce (D)	James W. W. Baker (D)	William J. Swain (R)	9R, 8D	18R, 17D	John J. Williams (R)	J. Allen Frear Jr. (D)	J. Caleb Boggs (R)	Dewey/ Warren (R) ✗
1950	Elbert N. Carvel (D)	Alexis I. du Pont Bayard (D)	Albert W. James (R)	Willard D. Boyce (D)	James W. W. Baker (D)	William J. Swain (R)	9R, 8D	18R, 17D	John J. Williams (R)	J. Allen Frear Jr. (D)	J. Caleb Boggs (R)	Dewey/ Warren (R) ✗
1951	Elbert N. Carvel (D)	Alexis I. du Pont Bayard (D)	H. Albert Young (R)	Ralph W. Emerson (R)	G. Dan Enterline (R)	William R. Murphy (R)	9D, 8R	19R, 16D	John J. Williams (R)	J. Allen Frear Jr. (D)	J. Caleb Boggs (R)	Dewey/ Warren (R) ✗
1952	Elbert N. Carvel (D)	Alexis I. du Pont Bayard (D)	H. Albert Young (R)	Ralph W. Emerson (R)	G. Dan Enterline (R)	William R. Murphy (R)	9D, 8R	19R, 16D	John J. Williams (R)	J. Allen Frear Jr. (D)	J. Caleb Boggs (R)	Eisenhower/ Nixon (R) ✓
1953	J. Caleb Boggs (R)	John W. Rollins (R)	H. Albert Young (R)	Clarence Collins Jr. (R)	G. Dan Enterline (R)	William R. Murphy (R)	10R, 7D	18R, 17D	John J. Williams (R)	J. Allen Frear Jr. (D)	Herbert Warburton (R)	Eisenhower/ Nixon (R) ✓
1954	J. Caleb Boggs (R)	John W. Rollins (R)	H. Albert Young (R)	Clarence Collins Jr. (R)	G. Dan Enterline (R)	William R. Murphy (R)	10R, 7D	18R, 17D	John J. Williams (R)	J. Allen Frear Jr. (D)	Herbert Warburton (R)	Eisenhower/ Nixon (R) ✓
1955	J. Caleb Boggs (R)	John W. Rollins (R)	Joseph D. Craven (D)	Howard H. Dickerson (D)	Clifford E. Hall (D)	Harry S. Smith (D)	12D, 5R	27D, 8R	John J. Williams (R)	J. Allen Frear Jr. (D)	Harris McDowell (D)	Eisenhower/ Nixon (R) ✓
1956	J. Caleb Boggs (R)	John W. Rollins (R)	Joseph D. Craven (D)	Howard H. Dickerson (D)	Clifford E. Hall (D)	Harry S. Smith (D)	12D, 5R	27D, 8R	John J. Williams (R)	J. Allen Frear Jr. (D)	Harris McDowell (D)	Eisenhower/ Nixon (R) ✓
1957	J. Caleb Boggs (R)	David P. Buckson (R)	Joseph D. Craven (D)	Vera Davis (R)	Dale E. Wheatley (R)	Harry S. Smith (D)	13D, 4R	19D, 16R	John J. Williams (R)	J. Allen Frear Jr. (D)	Hal Haskell (R)	Eisenhower/ Nixon (R) ✓
1958	J. Caleb Boggs (R)	David P. Buckson (R)	Joseph D. Craven (D)	Vera Davis (R)	Dale E. Wheatley (R)	Harry S. Smith (D)	13D, 4R	19D, 16R	John J. Williams (R)	J. Allen Frear Jr. (D)	Hal Haskell (R)	Eisenhower/ Nixon (R) ✓
1959	J. Caleb Boggs (R)	David P. Buckson (R)	Januar D. Bove Jr. (R)	Belle Everett (D)	Ernest E. Killen (D)	Harry S. Smith (D)	11D, 6R	26D, 9R	John J. Williams (R)	J. Allen Frear Jr. (D)	Harris McDowell (D)	Eisenhower/ Nixon (R) ✓
1960	J. Caleb Boggs (R)	David P. Buckson (R)	Januar D. Bove Jr. (R)	Belle Everett (D)	Ernest E. Killen (D)	Harry S. Smith (D)	11D, 6R	26D, 9R	John J. Williams (R)	J. Allen Frear Jr. (D)	Harris McDowell (D)	Eisenhower/ Nixon (R) ✓
1960	J. Caleb Boggs (R)	David P. Buckson (R)	Januar D. Bove Jr. (R)	Belle Everett (D)	Ernest E. Killen (D)	Harry S. Smith (D)	11D, 6R	26D, 9R	John J. Williams (R)	J. Allen Frear Jr. (D)	Harris McDowell (D)	Kennedy/ Johnson (D) ✓
1961	Elbert N. Carvel (D)	Eugene Lammot (D)	Januar D. Bove Jr. (R)	Belle Everett (D)	Ernest E. Killen (D)	Harry S. Smith (D)	11D, 6R	20D, 15R	John J. Williams (R)	J. Caleb Boggs (R)	Harris McDowell (D)	Kennedy/ Johnson (D) ✓
1962	Elbert N. Carvel (D)	Eugene Lammot (D)	Januar D. Bove Jr. (R)	Belle Everett (D)	Ernest E. Killen (D)	Harry S. Smith (D)	11D, 6R	20D, 15R	John J. Williams (R)	J. Caleb Boggs (R)	Harris McDowell (D)	Kennedy/ Johnson (D) ✓
1963	Elbert N. Carvel (D)	Eugene Lammot (D)	David P. Buckson (R)	Belle Everett (D)	Ernest E. Killen (D)	Robert Short (R)	10D, 7R	24D, 11R	John J. Williams (R)	J. Caleb Boggs (R)	Harris McDowell (D)	Kennedy/ Johnson (D) ✓
1964	Elbert N. Carvel (D)	Eugene Lammot (D)	David P. Buckson (R)	Belle Everett (D)	Ernest E. Killen (D)	Robert Short (R)	10D, 7R	24D, 11R	John J. Williams (R)	J. Caleb Boggs (R)	Harris McDowell (D)	Johnson/ Humphrey (D) ✓
1965	Charles L. Terry Jr. (D)	Sherman W. Tribbitt (D)	David P. Buckson (R)	Belle Everett (D)	Charles F. Moore (D)	Robert Short (R)	13D, 5R	30D, 5R	John J. Williams (R)	J. Caleb Boggs (R)	Harris McDowell (D)	Johnson/ Humphrey (D) ✓
1966	Charles L. Terry Jr. (D)	Sherman W. Tribbitt (D)	David P. Buckson (R)	Belle Everett (D)	Charles F. Moore (D)	Robert Short (R)	13D, 5R	30D, 5R	John J. Williams (R)	J. Caleb Boggs (R)	Harris McDowell (D)	Johnson/ Humphrey (D) ✓
1967	Charles L. Terry Jr. (D)	Sherman W. Tribbitt (D)	David P. Buckson (R)	Daniel Ross (R)	George W. Cripps (R)	Robert Short (R)	9R, 9D	23R, 12D	John J. Williams (R)	J. Caleb Boggs (R)	William Roth (R) (Note: Resigned December 31, 1970, to become a U.S. Senator.)	Johnson/ Humphrey (D) ✓
1968	Charles L. Terry Jr. (D)	Sherman W. Tribbitt (D)	David P. Buckson (R)	Daniel Ross (R)	George W. Cripps (R)	Robert Short (R)	9R, 9D	23R, 12D	John J. Williams (R)	J. Caleb Boggs (R)	William Roth (R)	Nixon/ Agnew (R) ✓
1969	Russell W. Peterson (R)	Eugene Bookhammer (R)	David P. Buckson (R)	Daniel Ross (R)	George W. Cripps (R)	Robert Short (R)	13R, 6D	26R, 13D	John J. Williams (R)	J. Caleb Boggs (R)	William Roth (R)	Nixon/ Agnew (R) ✓
1970	Russell W. Peterson (R)	Eugene Bookhammer (R)	David P. Buckson (R)	Daniel Ross (R)	George W. Cripps (R)	Robert Short (R)	13R, 6D	26R, 13D	John J. Williams (R)	J. Caleb Boggs (R)	William Roth (R)	Nixon/ Agnew (R) ✓
1971	Russell W. Peterson (R)	Eugene Bookhammer (R)	W. Laird Stabler Jr. (R)	Emily Womach (D)	George W. Cripps (R)	Robert Short (R)	13R, 6D	23R, 16D	William Roth (R)	J. Caleb Boggs (R)	Pete du Pont (R)	Nixon/ Agnew (R) ✓
1972	Russell W. Peterson (R)	Eugene Bookhammer (R)	W. Laird Stabler Jr. (R)	Emily Womach (D)	George W. Cripps (R)	Robert Short (R)	13R, 6D	23R, 16D	William Roth (R)	J. Caleb Boggs (R)	Pete du Pont (R)	Nixon/ Agnew (R) ✓
1973	Sherman W. Tribbitt (D)	Eugene Bookhammer (R)	W. Laird Stabler Jr. (R)	Mary Jornlin (R)	F. Earl McGinnes (D)	Robert Short (R)	11R, 10D	21R, 20D	William Roth (R)	Joe Biden (D) (Note: Resigned after being elected Vice President of the United States)	Pete du Pont (R)	Nixon/ Agnew (R) ✓
1974	Sherman W. Tribbitt (D)	Eugene Bookhammer (R)	W. Laird Stabler Jr. (R)	Mary Jornlin (R)	F. Earl McGinnes (D)	Robert Short (R)	11R, 10D	21R, 20D	William Roth (R)	Joe Biden (D)	Pete du Pont (R)	Nixon/ Agnew (R) ✓
1975	Sherman W. Tribbitt (D)	Eugene Bookhammer (R)	Richard R. Wier Jr. (D)	Mary Jornlin (R)	Richard T. Collins (R)	Robert Short (R)	13D, 8R	25D, 16R	William Roth (R)	Joe Biden (D)	Pete du Pont (R)	Nixon/ Agnew (R) ✓
1976	Sherman W. Tribbitt (D)	Eugene Bookhammer (R)	Richard R. Wier Jr. (D)	Mary Jornlin (R)	Richard T. Collins (R)	Robert Short (R)	13D, 8R	25D, 16R	William Roth (R)	Joe Biden (D)	Pete du Pont (R)	Carter/ Mondale (D) ✓
1977	Pete du Pont (R)	James D. McGinnis (D)	Richard R. Wier Jr. (D)	Tom Carper (D)	Richard T. Collins (R)	David H. Elliott (R)	13D, 8R	26D, 15R	William Roth (R)	Joe Biden (D)	Thomas B. Evans Jr. (R)	Carter/ Mondale (D) ✓
1978	Pete du Pont (R)	James D. McGinnis (D)	Richard R. Wier Jr. (D)	Tom Carper (D)	Richard T. Collins (R)	David H. Elliott (R)	13D, 8R	26D, 15R	William Roth (R)	Joe Biden (D)	Thomas B. Evans Jr. (R)	Carter/ Mondale (D) ✓
1979	Pete du Pont (R)	James D. McGinnis (D)	Richard S. Gebelein (R)	Tom Carper (D)	Richard T. Collins (R)	David H. Elliott (R)	13D, 8R	21D, 20R	William Roth (R)	Joe Biden (D)	Thomas B. Evans Jr. (R)	Carter/ Mondale (D) ✓
1980	Pete du Pont (R)	James D. McGinnis (D)	Richard S. Gebelein (R)	Tom Carper (D)	Richard T. Collins (R)	David H. Elliott (R)	13D, 8R	21D, 20R	William Roth (R)	Joe Biden (D)	Thomas B. Evans Jr. (R)	Reagan/ Bush (R) ✓
1981	Pete du Pont (R)	Mike Castle (R)	Richard S. Gebelein (R)	Tom Carper (D)	Thomas W. Spruance (R)	David H. Elliott (R)	12D, 9R	25R, 16D	William Roth (R)	Joe Biden (D)	Thomas B. Evans Jr. (R)	Reagan/ Bush (R) ✓
1982	Pete du Pont (R)	Mike Castle (R)	Richard S. Gebelein (R)	Tom Carper (D)	Thomas W. Spruance (R)	David H. Elliott (R)	12D, 9R	25R, 16D	William Roth (R)	Joe Biden (D)	Thomas B. Evans Jr. (R)	Reagan/ Bush (R) ✓
1983	Pete du Pont (R)	Mike Castle (R)	Charles Oberly (D)	Janet Rzewnicki (R)	Dennis Greenhouse (D)	David H. Elliott (R)	13D, 8R	25D, 16R	William Roth (R)	Joe Biden (D)	Tom Carper (D)	Reagan/ Bush (R) ✓
1984	Pete du Pont (R)	Mike Castle (R)	Charles Oberly (D)	Janet Rzewnicki (R)	Dennis Greenhouse (D)	David H. Elliott (R)	13D, 8R	25D, 16R	William Roth (R)	Joe Biden (D)	Tom Carper (D)	Reagan/ Bush (R) ✓
1985	Mike Castle (R)	S. B. Woo (D)	Charles Oberly (D)	Janet Rzewnicki (R)	Dennis Greenhouse (D)	David N. Levinson (D)	13D, 8R	22R, 19D	William Roth (R)	Joe Biden (D)	Tom Carper (D)	Reagan/ Bush (R) ✓
1986	Mike Castle (R)	S. B. Woo (D)	Charles Oberly (D)	Janet Rzewnicki (R)	Dennis Greenhouse (D)	David N. Levinson (D)	13D, 8R	22R, 19D	William Roth (R)	Joe Biden (D)	Tom Carper (D)	Reagan/ Bush (R) ✓
1987	Mike Castle (R)	S. B. Woo (D)	Charles Oberly (D)	Janet Rzewnicki (R)	Dennis Greenhouse (D)	David N. Levinson (D)	13D, 8R	22R, 19D	William Roth (R)	Joe Biden (D)	Tom Carper (D)	Reagan/ Bush (R) ✓
1988	Mike Castle (R)	S. B. Woo (D)	Charles Oberly (D)	Janet Rzewnicki (R)	Dennis Greenhouse (D)	David N. Levinson (D)	13D, 8R	22R, 19D	William Roth (R)	Joe Biden (D)	Tom Carper (D)	Bush/ Quayle (R) ✓
1989	Mike Castle (R)	Dale E. Wolf (R)	Charles Oberly (D)	Janet Rzewnicki (R)	Dennis Greenhouse (D)	David N. Levinson (D)	13D, 8R	22R, 19D	William Roth (R)	Joe Biden (D)	Tom Carper (D)	Bush/ Quayle (R) ✓
1989	Mike Castle (R)	Dale E. Wolf (R)	Charles Oberly (D)	Janet Rzewnicki (R)	Tom Wagner (R)	David N. Levinson (D)	13D, 8R	22R, 19D	William Roth (R)	Joe Biden (D)	Tom Carper (D)	Bush/ Quayle (R) ✓
1990	Mike Castle (R)	Dale E. Wolf (R)	Charles Oberly (D)	Janet Rzewnicki (R)	Tom Wagner (R)	David N. Levinson (D)	13D, 8R	22R, 19D	William Roth (R)	Joe Biden (D)	Tom Carper (D)	Bush/ Quayle (R) ✓
1991	Mike Castle (R)	Dale E. Wolf (R)	Charles Oberly (D)	Janet Rzewnicki (R)	Tom Wagner (R)	David N. Levinson (D)	15D, 6R	24R, 17D	William Roth (R)	Joe Biden (D)	Tom Carper (D)	Bush/ Quayle (R) ✓
1992	Mike Castle (R)	Dale E. Wolf (R)	Charles Oberly (D)	Janet Rzewnicki (R)	Tom Wagner (R)	David N. Levinson (D)	15D, 6R	24R, 17D	William Roth (R)	Joe Biden (D)	Tom Carper (D)	Bush/ Quayle (R) ✓
1992	Mike Castle (R)	Dale E. Wolf (R)	Charles Oberly (D)	Janet Rzewnicki (R)	Tom Wagner (R)	David N. Levinson (D)	15D, 6R	24R, 17D	William Roth (R)	Joe Biden (D)	Tom Carper (D)	Clinton/ Gore (D) ✓
1993	Tom Carper (D) (Note: Resigned office on January 3, 2001, to begin term in the U.S. Senate, and was succeeded as governor by Ruth Ann Minner for the remaining 17 days of his term.)	Ruth Ann Minner (D)	Charles Oberly (D)	Janet Rzewnicki (R)	Tom Wagner (R)	Donna Lee Williams (R)	15D, 6R	22R, 19D	William Roth (R)	Joe Biden (D)	Mike Castle (R)	Clinton/ Gore (D) ✓
1994	Tom Carper (D)	Ruth Ann Minner (D)	Charles Oberly (D)	Janet Rzewnicki (R)	Tom Wagner (R)	Donna Lee Williams (R)	15D, 6R	22R, 19D	William Roth (R)	Joe Biden (D)	Mike Castle (R)	Clinton/ Gore (D) ✓
1995	Tom Carper (D)	Ruth Ann Minner (D)	M. Jane Brady (R)	Janet Rzewnicki (R)	Tom Wagner (R)	Donna Lee Williams (R)	12D, 9R	27R, 14D	William Roth (R)	Joe Biden (D)	Mike Castle (R)	Clinton/ Gore (D) ✓
1996	Tom Carper (D)	Ruth Ann Minner (D)	M. Jane Brady (R)	Janet Rzewnicki (R)	Tom Wagner (R)	Donna Lee Williams (R)	12D, 9R	27R, 14D	William Roth (R)	Joe Biden (D)	Mike Castle (R)	Clinton/ Gore (D) ✓
1997	Tom Carper (D)	Ruth Ann Minner (D)	M. Jane Brady (R)	Janet Rzewnicki (R)	Tom Wagner (R)	Donna Lee Williams (R)	12D, 9R	23R, 18D	William Roth (R)	Joe Biden (D)	Mike Castle (R)	Clinton/ Gore (D) ✓
1998	Tom Carper (D)	Ruth Ann Minner (D)	M. Jane Brady (R)	Janet Rzewnicki (R)	Tom Wagner (R)	Donna Lee Williams (R)	12D, 9R	23R, 18D	William Roth (R)	Joe Biden (D)	Mike Castle (R)	Clinton/ Gore (D) ✓
1999	Tom Carper (D)	Ruth Ann Minner (D)	M. Jane Brady (R)	Jack Markell (D)	Tom Wagner (R)	Donna Lee Williams (R)	13D, 8R	26R, 15D	William Roth (R)	Joe Biden (D)	Mike Castle (R)	Clinton/ Gore (D) ✓
2000	Tom Carper (D)	Ruth Ann Minner (D)	M. Jane Brady (R)	Jack Markell (D)	Tom Wagner (R)	Donna Lee Williams (R)	13D, 8R	26R, 15D	William Roth (R)	Joe Biden (D)	Mike Castle (R)	Gore/ Lieberman (D) ✗
2001	Ruth Ann Minner (D)	John Carney (D)	M. Jane Brady (R)	Jack Markell (D)	Tom Wagner (R)	Donna Lee Williams (R)	13D, 8R	26R, 15D	Tom Carper (D)	Joe Biden (D)	Mike Castle (R)	Gore/ Lieberman (D) ✗
2002	Ruth Ann Minner (D)	John Carney (D)	M. Jane Brady (R)	Jack Markell (D)	Tom Wagner (R)	Donna Lee Williams (R)	13D, 8R	26R, 15D	Tom Carper (D)	Joe Biden (D)	Mike Castle (R)	Gore/ Lieberman (D) ✗
2003	Ruth Ann Minner (D)	John Carney (D)	M. Jane Brady (R)	Jack Markell (D)	Tom Wagner (R)	Donna Lee Williams (R)	13D, 8R	29R, 12D	Tom Carper (D)	Joe Biden (D)	Mike Castle (R)	Gore/ Lieberman (D) ✗
2004	Ruth Ann Minner (D)	John Carney (D)	M. Jane Brady (R)	Jack Markell (D)	Tom Wagner (R)	Donna Lee Williams (R)	13D, 8R	29R, 12D	Tom Carper (D)	Joe Biden (D)	Mike Castle (R)	Kerry/ Edwards (D) ✗
2005	Ruth Ann Minner (D)	John Carney (D)	M. Jane Brady (R)	Jack Markell (D)	Tom Wagner (R)	Matthew Denn (D)	13D, 8R	26R, 15D	Tom Carper (D)	Joe Biden (D)	Mike Castle (R)	Kerry/ Edwards (D) ✗
2006	Ruth Ann Minner (D)	John Carney (D)	Carl Danberg (D)	Jack Markell (D)	Tom Wagner (R)	Matthew Denn (D)	13D, 8R	26R, 15D	Tom Carper (D)	Joe Biden (D)	Mike Castle (R)	Kerry/ Edwards (D) ✗
2007	Ruth Ann Minner (D)	John Carney (D)	Beau Biden (D)	Jack Markell (D)	Tom Wagner (R)	Matthew Denn (D)	13D, 8R	23R, 18D	Tom Carper (D)	Joe Biden (D)	Mike Castle (R)	Kerry/ Edwards (D) ✗
2008	Ruth Ann Minner (D)	John Carney (D)	Beau Biden (D)	Jack Markell (D)	Tom Wagner (R)	Matthew Denn (D)	13D, 8R	23R, 18D	Tom Carper (D)	Joe Biden (D)	Mike Castle (R)	Obama/ Biden (D) ✓
2009	Jack Markell (D)	Matthew Denn (D)	Beau Biden (D)	Velda Jones-Potter (D)	Tom Wagner (R)	Karen Weldin Stewart (D)	16D, 5R	24D, 17R	Tom Carper (D)	Ted Kaufman (D) (Note: Appointed to fill the vacancy created by Biden's resignation.)	Mike Castle (R)	Obama/ Biden (D) ✓
2010	Jack Markell (D)	Matthew Denn (D)	Beau Biden (D)	Velda Jones-Potter (D)	Tom Wagner (R)	Karen Weldin Stewart (D)	15D, 6R (Note: A special election occurred after the death of Sen. Thurman Adams Jr. (D), who was succeeded by Joseph W. Booth (R) after the 2009 session, flipping the seat from Democratic to Republican.)	24D, 17R	Tom Carper (D)	Chris Coons (D)	Mike Castle (R)	Obama/ Biden (D) ✓
2011	Jack Markell (D)	Matthew Denn (D)	Beau Biden (D)	Chipman Flowers Jr. (D)	Tom Wagner (R)	Karen Weldin Stewart (D)	14D, 7R	26D, 15R	Tom Carper (D)	Chris Coons (D)	John Carney (D)	Obama/ Biden (D) ✓
2012	Jack Markell (D)	Matthew Denn (D)	Beau Biden (D)	Chipman Flowers Jr. (D)	Tom Wagner (R)	Karen Weldin Stewart (D)	14D, 7R	26D, 15R	Tom Carper (D)	Chris Coons (D)	John Carney (D)	Obama/ Biden (D) ✓
2013	Jack Markell (D)	Matthew Denn (D)	Beau Biden (D)	Chipman Flowers Jr. (D)	Tom Wagner (R)	Karen Weldin Stewart (D)	13D, 8R	27D, 14R	Tom Carper (D)	Chris Coons (D)	John Carney (D)	Obama/ Biden (D) ✓
2014	Jack Markell (D)	Matthew Denn (D)	Beau Biden (D)	Chipman Flowers Jr. (D)	Tom Wagner (R)	Karen Weldin Stewart (D)	13D, 8R	27D, 14R	Tom Carper (D)	Chris Coons (D)	John Carney (D)	Obama/ Biden (D) ✓
2015	Jack Markell (D)	vacant	Matthew Denn (D)	Ken Simpler (R)	Tom Wagner (R)	Karen Weldin Stewart (D)	12D, 9R	25D, 16R	Tom Carper (D)	Chris Coons (D)	John Carney (D)	Obama/ Biden (D) ✓
2016	Jack Markell (D)	vacant	Matthew Denn (D)	Ken Simpler (R)	Tom Wagner (R)	Karen Weldin Stewart (D)	12D, 9R	25D, 16R	Tom Carper (D)	Chris Coons (D)	John Carney (D)	Clinton/ Kaine (D) ✗
2017	John Carney (D)	Bethany Hall-Long (D)	Matthew Denn (D)	Ken Simpler (R)	Tom Wagner (R)	Trinidad Navarro (D)	11D, 10R	25D, 16R	Tom Carper (D)	Chris Coons (D)	Lisa Blunt Rochester (D)	Clinton/ Kaine (D) ✗
2018	John Carney (D)	Bethany Hall-Long (D)	Matthew Denn (D)	Ken Simpler (R)	Tom Wagner (R)	Trinidad Navarro (D)	11D, 10R	25D, 16R	Tom Carper (D)	Chris Coons (D)	Lisa Blunt Rochester (D)	Clinton/ Kaine (D) ✗
2019	John Carney (D)	Bethany Hall-Long (D)	Kathy Jennings (D)	Colleen Davis (D)	Kathy McGuiness (D) (Note: Resigned on October 19, 2022, after being convicted for corruption and conflict of interest.)	Trinidad Navarro (D)	12D, 9R	26D, 15R	Tom Carper (D)	Chris Coons (D)	Lisa Blunt Rochester (D)	Clinton/ Kaine (D) ✗
2020	John Carney (D)	Bethany Hall-Long (D)	Kathy Jennings (D)	Colleen Davis (D)	Kathy McGuiness (D)	Trinidad Navarro (D)	12D, 9R	26D, 15R	Tom Carper (D)	Chris Coons (D)	Lisa Blunt Rochester (D)	Biden/ Harris (D) ✓
2021	John Carney (D)	Bethany Hall-Long (D)	Kathy Jennings (D)	Colleen Davis (D)	Kathy McGuiness (D)	Trinidad Navarro (D)	14D, 7R	26D, 15R	Tom Carper (D)	Chris Coons (D)	Lisa Blunt Rochester (D)	Biden/ Harris (D) ✓
2022	John Carney (D)	Bethany Hall-Long (D)	Kathy Jennings (D)	Colleen Davis (D)	Kathy McGuiness (D)	Trinidad Navarro (D)	14D, 7R	26D, 15R	Tom Carper (D)	Chris Coons (D)	Lisa Blunt Rochester (D)	Biden/ Harris (D) ✓
2022	John Carney (D)	Bethany Hall-Long (D)	Kathy Jennings (D)	Colleen Davis (D)	Dennis Greenhouse (D)	Trinidad Navarro (D)	14D, 7R	26D, 15R	Tom Carper (D)	Chris Coons (D)	Lisa Blunt Rochester (D)	Biden/ Harris (D) ✓
2023	John Carney (D)	Bethany Hall-Long (D)	Kathy Jennings (D)	Colleen Davis (D)	Lydia York (D)	Trinidad Navarro (D)	15D, 6R	26D, 15R	Tom Carper (D)	Chris Coons (D)	Lisa Blunt Rochester (D)	Biden/ Harris (D) ✓
2024	John Carney (D)	Bethany Hall-Long (D)	Kathy Jennings (D)	Colleen Davis (D)	Lydia York (D)	Trinidad Navarro (D)	15D, 6R	26D, 15R	Tom Carper (D)	Chris Coons (D)	Lisa Blunt Rochester (D)	Harris/ Walz (D) ✗
2025	Matt Meyer (D)	Kyle Evans Gay (D)	Kathy Jennings (D)	Colleen Davis (D)	Lydia York (D)	Trinidad Navarro (D)	15D, 6R	27D, 14R	Lisa Blunt Rochester (D)	Chris Coons (D)	Sarah McBride (D)	Harris/ Walz (D) ✗
2026	Matt Meyer (D)	Kyle Evans Gay (D)	Kathy Jennings (D)	Colleen Davis (D)	Lydia York (D)	Trinidad Navarro (D)	15D, 6R	27D, 14R	Lisa Blunt Rochester (D)	Chris Coons (D)	Sarah McBride (D)	Harris/ Walz (D) ✗
2027	Matt Meyer (D)	Kyle Evans Gay (D)	Kathy Jennings (D)	Ted Lauzen (D)	Lydia York (D)	Trinidad Navarro (D)	15D, 6R	30D, 11R	Lisa Blunt Rochester (D)	Chris Coons (D)	Sarah McBride (D)	Harris/ Walz (D) ✗

== See also ==
- Law and government in Delaware
- Politics of Delaware
- Elections in Delaware
