= Delaware's congressional delegations =

Delaware became a U.S. state in 1787, which allowed it to send congressional delegations to the United States Senate and United States House of Representatives beginning with the 1st United States Congress in 1789. Voters in each state elect two senators to serve for six years, and members of the House to two-year terms. Before 1914 United States Senators were chosen by the Delaware General Assembly. Before 1935, all congressional terms began March 4.

This is a chronological listing, in timeline format, of the congressional delegations from Delaware to the United States Senate and United States House of Representatives.

The dates for the various Congress represent the range of dates they could have been in session, rather than the actual dates of the sessions. Congressional terms began on March 4 through 1933. Since 1935, they have begun on January 3. The juxtaposition of the terms with the sessions is approximate; see the footnotes for actual dates of special appointments, elections, resignations or deaths.

== Current delegation ==
Current U.S. senators from Delaware
| Delaware CPVI (2025): D+8 | Class I senator | Class II senator |
|---|---|---|
| Delaware CPVI (2025): D+8 | Lisa Blunt Rochester (Junior senator) (Wilmington) | Chris Coons (Senior senator) (Wilmington) |
| Party | Democratic | Democratic |
| Incumbent since | January 3, 2025 | November 15, 2010 |

Delaware's current congressional delegation in the 119th Congress consists of its two senators and its sole representative, all of whom are Democrats.

The current dean of the Delaware's delegation is Senator Chris Coons, having served in the Senate since 2010.

Current U.S. representatives from Delaware
| District | Member (Residence) | Party | Incumbent since | CPVI (2025) | District map |
|---|---|---|---|---|---|
| At-large | Sarah McBride (Wilmington) | Democratic | January 3, 2025 | D+8 | |

== United States Senate ==
The alternating grey and white boxes indicate the duration of the six-year Senate terms.

| Class I senator | Congress | Class II senator |
|---|---|---|
| George Read (PA) | 1st (1789–1791) | Richard Bassett (AA) |
| George Read (PA) | 2nd (1791–1793) | Richard Bassett (PA) |
| George Read (PA) | 3rd (1793–1795) | John Vining (PA) (Note: Resigned January 19, 1798.) |
| Henry Latimer (PA) | 3rd (1793–1795) | John Vining (PA) |
| Henry Latimer (F) | 4th (1795–1797) | John Vining (PA) |
| Henry Latimer (F) | 5th (1797–1799) | John Vining (PA) |
| Henry Latimer (F) | 5th (1797–1799) | Joshua Clayton (F) (Note: Elected to fill vacancy left by Vining's resignation, died August 11, 1798.) |
| Henry Latimer (F) | 5th (1797–1799) | William H. Wells (F) (Note: Elected to fill vacancy left by Clayton's death.) |
| Henry Latimer (F) | 6th (1799–1801) | William H. Wells (F) |
| Samuel White (F) | 7th (1801–1803) | William H. Wells (F) |
| Samuel White (F) | 8th (1803–1805) | William H. Wells (F) |
| Samuel White (F) | 9th (1805–1807) | James A. Bayard (F) |
| Samuel White (F) | 10th (1807–1809) | James A. Bayard (F) |
| Outerbridge Horsey (F) | 11th (1809–1811) | James A. Bayard (F) |
| Outerbridge Horsey (F) | 12th (1811–1813) | James A. Bayard (F) |
| Outerbridge Horsey (F) | 13th (1813–1815) | William H. Wells (F) |
| Outerbridge Horsey (F) | 14th (1815–1817) | William H. Wells (F) |
| Outerbridge Horsey (F) | 15th (1817–1819) | Nicholas Van Dyke (F) |
| Outerbridge Horsey (F) | 16th (1819–1821) | Nicholas Van Dyke (F) |
| vacant | 17th (1821–1823) | Nicholas Van Dyke (F) |
| Caesar A. Rodney (DR) | 17th (1821–1823) | Nicholas Van Dyke (F) |
| vacant | 17th (1821–1823) | Nicholas Van Dyke (F) |
| vacant | 18th (1823–1825) | Nicholas Van Dyke (F) |
| Thomas Clayton (F) | 18th (1823–1825) | Nicholas Van Dyke (F) |
| Thomas Clayton (NR) | 19th (1825–1827) | Daniel Rodney (NR) |
| Louis McLane (J) | 20th (1827–1829) | Henry M. Ridgely (J) |
| Arnold Naudain (NR) | 21st (1829–1831) | John M. Clayton (NR) |
| Arnold Naudain (NR) | 22nd (1831–1833) | John M. Clayton (NR) |
| Arnold Naudain (NR) | 23rd (1833–1835) | John M. Clayton (NR) |
| Richard H. Bayard (NR) | 24th (1835–1837) | John M. Clayton (NR) |
| Richard H. Bayard (NR) | 24th (1835–1837) | Thomas Clayton (NR) |
| Richard H. Bayard (W) | 25th (1837–1839) | Thomas Clayton (W) |
| Richard H. Bayard (W) | 26th (1839–1841) | Thomas Clayton (W) |
| vacant | 26th (1839–1841) | Thomas Clayton (W) |
| Richard H. Bayard (W) | 27th (1841–1843) | Thomas Clayton (W) |
| Richard H. Bayard (W) | 28th (1843–1845) | Thomas Clayton (W) |
| John M. Clayton (W) | 29th (1845–1847) | Thomas Clayton (W) |
| John M. Clayton (W) | 30th (1847–1849) | Presley Spruance (W) |
| John Wales (W) | 31st (1849–1851) | Presley Spruance (W) |
| James A. Bayard Jr. (D) | 32nd (1851–1853) | Presley Spruance (W) |
| James A. Bayard Jr. (D) | 33rd (1853–1855) | John M. Clayton (W) |
| James A. Bayard Jr. (D) | 34th (1855–1857) | Joseph P. Comegys (W) |
| James A. Bayard Jr. (D) | 35th (1857–1859) | Martin W. Bates (D) |
| James A. Bayard Jr. (D) | 36th (1859–1861) | Willard Saulsbury Sr. (D) |
| James A. Bayard Jr. (D) | 37th (1861–1863) | Willard Saulsbury Sr. (D) |
| George R. Riddle (D) | 38th (1863–1865) | Willard Saulsbury Sr. (D) |
| George R. Riddle (D) | 39th (1865–1867) | Willard Saulsbury Sr. (D) |
| James A. Bayard Jr. (D) | 40th (1867–1869) | Willard Saulsbury Sr. (D) |
| Thomas F. Bayard (D) | 41st (1869–1871) | Willard Saulsbury Sr. (D) |
| Thomas F. Bayard (D) | 42nd (1871–1873) | Eli Saulsbury (D) |
| Thomas F. Bayard (D) | 43rd (1873–1875) | Eli Saulsbury (D) |
| Thomas F. Bayard (D) | 44th (1875–1877) | Eli Saulsbury (D) |
| Thomas F. Bayard (D) | 45th (1877–1879) | Eli Saulsbury (D) |
| Thomas F. Bayard (D) | 46th (1879–1881) | Eli Saulsbury (D) |
| Thomas F. Bayard (D) | 47th (1881–1883) | Eli Saulsbury (D) |
| Thomas F. Bayard (D) | 48th (1883–1885) | Eli Saulsbury (D) |
| George Gray (D) | 49th (1885–1887) | Eli Saulsbury (D) |
| George Gray (D) | 50th (1887–1889) | Eli Saulsbury (D) |
| George Gray (D) | 51st (1889–1891) | Anthony Higgins (R) |
| George Gray (D) | 52nd (1891–1893) | Anthony Higgins (R) |
| George Gray (D) | 53rd (1893–1895) | Anthony Higgins (R) |
| George Gray (D) | 54th (1895–1897) | vacant |
| George Gray (D) | 55th (1897–1899) | Richard R. Kenney (D) |
| vacant | 56th (1899–1901) | Richard R. Kenney (D) |
| vacant | 57th (1901–1903) | vacant |
| L. Heisler Ball (R) | 58th (1903–1905) | J. Frank Allee (R) |
| vacant | 59th (1905–1907) | J. Frank Allee (R) |
| Henry A. du Pont (R) | 59th (1905–1907) | J. Frank Allee (R) |
| Henry A. du Pont (R) | 60th (1907–1909) | Harry A. Richardson (R) |
| Henry A. du Pont (R) | 61st (1909–1911) | Harry A. Richardson (R) |
| Henry A. du Pont (R) | 62nd (1911–1913) | Harry A. Richardson (R) |
| Henry A. du Pont (R) | 63rd (1913–1915) | Willard Saulsbury Jr. (D) |
| Henry A. du Pont (R) | 64th (1915–1917) | Willard Saulsbury Jr. (D) |
| Josiah O. Wolcott (D) | 65th (1917–1919) | Willard Saulsbury Jr. (D) |
| Josiah O. Wolcott (D) | 66th (1919–1921) | L. Heisler Ball (R) |
| T. Coleman du Pont (R) | 67th (1921–1923) | L. Heisler Ball (R) |
| Thomas F. Bayard Jr. (D) | 68th (1923–1925) | L. Heisler Ball (R) |
| Thomas F. Bayard Jr. (D) | 69th (1925–1927) | T. Coleman du Pont (R) |
| Thomas F. Bayard Jr. (D) | 70th (1927–1929) | T. Coleman du Pont (R) |
| John G. Townsend Jr. (R) | 71st (1929–1931) | Daniel O. Hastings (R) |
| John G. Townsend Jr. (R) | 72nd (1931–1933) | Daniel O. Hastings (R) |
| John G. Townsend Jr. (R) | 73rd (1933–1935) | Daniel O. Hastings (R) |
| John G. Townsend Jr. (R) | 74th (1935–1937) | Daniel O. Hastings (R) |
| John G. Townsend Jr. (R) | 75th (1937–1939) | James H. Hughes (D) |
| John G. Townsend Jr. (R) | 76th (1939–1941) | James H. Hughes (D) |
| James M. Tunnell (D) | 77th (1941–1943) | James H. Hughes (D) |
| James M. Tunnell (D) | 78th (1943–1945) | C. Douglass Buck (R) |
| James M. Tunnell (D) | 79th (1945–1947) | C. Douglass Buck (R) |
| John J. Williams (R) | 80th (1947–1949) | C. Douglass Buck (R) |
| John J. Williams (R) | 81st (1949–1951) | J. Allen Frear Jr. (D) |
| John J. Williams (R) | 82nd (1951–1953) | J. Allen Frear Jr. (D) |
| John J. Williams (R) | 83rd (1953–1955) | J. Allen Frear Jr. (D) |
| John J. Williams (R) | 84th (1955–1957) | J. Allen Frear Jr. (D) |
| John J. Williams (R) | 85th (1957–1959) | J. Allen Frear Jr. (D) |
| John J. Williams (R) | 86th (1959–1961) | J. Allen Frear Jr. (D) |
| John J. Williams (R) | 87th (1961–1963) | J. Caleb Boggs (R) |
| John J. Williams (R) | 88th (1963–1965) | J. Caleb Boggs (R) |
| John J. Williams (R) | 89th (1965–1967) | J. Caleb Boggs (R) |
| John J. Williams (R) | 90th (1967–1969) | J. Caleb Boggs (R) |
| John J. Williams (R) | 91st (1969–1971) | J. Caleb Boggs (R) |
| William Roth (R) | 92nd (1971–1973) | J. Caleb Boggs (R) |
| William Roth (R) | 93rd (1973–1975) | Joe Biden (D) (Note: Resigned upon being elected Vice-President.) |
| William Roth (R) | 94th (1975–1977) | Joe Biden (D) |
| William Roth (R) | 95th (1977–1979) | Joe Biden (D) |
| William Roth (R) | 96th (1979–1981) | Joe Biden (D) |
| William Roth (R) | 97th (1981–1983) | Joe Biden (D) |
| William Roth (R) | 98th (1983–1985) | Joe Biden (D) |
| William Roth (R) | 99th (1985–1987) | Joe Biden (D) |
| William Roth (R) | 100th (1987–1989) | Joe Biden (D) |
| William Roth (R) | 101st (1989–1991) | Joe Biden (D) |
| William Roth (R) | 102nd (1991–1993) | Joe Biden (D) |
| William Roth (R) | 103rd (1993–1995) | Joe Biden (D) |
| William Roth (R) | 104th (1995–1997) | Joe Biden (D) |
| William Roth (R) | 105th (1997–1999) | Joe Biden (D) |
| William Roth (R) | 106th (1999–2001) | Joe Biden (D) |
| Tom Carper (D) | 107th (2001–2003) | Joe Biden (D) |
| Tom Carper (D) | 108th (2003–2005) | Joe Biden (D) |
| Tom Carper (D) | 109th (2005–2007) | Joe Biden (D) |
| Tom Carper (D) | 110th (2007–2009) | Joe Biden (D) |
| Tom Carper (D) | 111th (2009–2011) | Joe Biden (D) |
| Tom Carper (D) | 111th (2009–2011) | Ted Kaufman (D) |
| Tom Carper (D) | 111th (2009–2011) | Chris Coons (D) |
| Tom Carper (D) | 112th (2011–2013) | Chris Coons (D) |
| Tom Carper (D) | 113th (2013–2015) | Chris Coons (D) |
| Tom Carper (D) | 114th (2015–2017) | Chris Coons (D) |
| Tom Carper (D) | 115th (2017–2019) | Chris Coons (D) |
| Tom Carper (D) | 116th (2019–2021) | Chris Coons (D) |
| Tom Carper (D) | 117th (2021–2023) | Chris Coons (D) |
| Tom Carper (D) | 118th (2023–2025) | Chris Coons (D) |
| Lisa Blunt Rochester (D) | 119th (2025–2027) | Chris Coons (D) |
| Lisa Blunt Rochester (D) | 120th (2027–2029) | Chris Coons (D) |

== United States House of Representatives ==
In Delaware all representatives have been elected statewide at-large, rather than by district. Delaware has always had one seat apportioned to it, except for the 13th through 17th Congresses (1813–1823), when it was apportioned two seats per 1810 census.

| Congress | At-large | |
|---|---|---|
| 1st (1789–1791) | John Vining (PA) | |
| 2nd (1791–1793) | John Vining (PA) | |
| 3rd (1793–1795) | John Patten (AA) (Note: Contested election, served until February 14, 1794, when a successor was selected.) | |
| 3rd (1793–1795) | Henry Latimer (F) (Note: Successfully contested election of John Patten, seated February 14, 1794; resigned February 7, 1795, to become U.S. Senator.) | |
| 4th (1795–1797) | John Patten (DR) | |
| 5th (1797–1799) | James A. Bayard (F) | |
| 6th (1799–1801) | James A. Bayard (F) | |
| 7th (1801–1803) | James A. Bayard (F) | |
| 8th (1803–1805) | Caesar Rodney (DR) | |
| 9th (1805–1807) | James M. Broom (F) (Note: Resigned October 6, 1807, before Tenth Congress assembled.) | |
| 10th (1807–1809) | Nicholas Van Dyke (F) (Note: Elected to fill vacancy caused by the resignation of James M. Broom, seated December 2, 1807.) | |
| 11th (1809–1811) | Nicholas Van Dyke (F) | |
| 12th (1811–1813) | Henry M. Ridgely (F) | |
| 13th (1813–1815) | Henry M. Ridgely (F) | At-large seat 2 |
| 13th (1813–1815) | Henry M. Ridgely (F) | Thomas Cooper (F) |
| 14th (1815–1817) | Thomas Clayton (F) | Thomas Cooper (F) |
| 15th (1817–1819) | Louis McLane (F) | Willard Hall (DR) (Note: Resigned January 22, 1821.) |
| 16th (1819–1821) | Louis McLane (F) | Willard Hall (DR) |
| 17th (1821–1823) | Louis McLane (F) | Caesar A. Rodney (DR) (Note: Resigned January 24, 1822, to become U.S. Senator.) |
| 17th (1821–1823) | Louis McLane (F) | Daniel Rodney (F) (Note: Elected to fill vacancy caused by the resignation of Caesar A. Rodney, seated December 2, 1822.) |
| 18th (1823–1825) | Louis McLane (F) | |
| 19th (1825–1827) | Louis McLane (J) | |
| 20th (1827–1829) | Kensey Johns Jr. (NR) (Note: Elected to fill vacancy caused by the resignation of Louis McLane in the preceding Congress, seated December 3, 1827.) | |
| 21st (1829–1831) | Kensey Johns Jr. (NR) | |
| 22nd (1831–1833) | John J. Milligan (NR) | |
| 23rd (1833–1835) | John J. Milligan (NR) | |
| 24th (1835–1837) | John J. Milligan (NR) | |
| 25th (1837–1839) | John J. Milligan (W) | |
| 26th (1839–1841) | Thomas Robinson Jr. (D) | |
| 27th (1841–1843) | George B. Rodney (W) | |
| 28th (1843–1845) | George B. Rodney (W) | |
| 29th (1845–1847) | John W. Houston (W) | |
| 30th (1847–1849) | John W. Houston (W) | |
| 31st (1849–1851) | John W. Houston (W) | |
| 32nd (1851–1853) | George R. Riddle (D) | |
| 33rd (1853–1855) | George R. Riddle (D) | |
| 34th (1855–1857) | Elisha D. Cullen (KN) | |
| 35th (1857–1859) | William G. Whiteley (D) | |
| 36th (1859–1861) | William G. Whiteley (D) | |
| 37th (1861–1863) | George P. Fisher (U) | |
| 38th (1863–1865) | William Temple (D) (Note: Died May 28, 1863, before Congress assembled.) | |
| 38th (1863–1865) | Nathaniel B. Smithers (U) (Note: Elected to fill vacancy caused by the death of William Temple, seated December 7, 1863.) | |
| 39th (1865–1867) | John A. Nicholson (D) | |
| 40th (1867–1869) | John A. Nicholson (D) | |
| 41st (1869–1871) | Benjamin T. Biggs (D) | |
| 42nd (1871–1873) | Benjamin T. Biggs (D) | |
| 43rd (1873–1875) | James R. Lofland (R) | |
| 44th (1875–1877) | James Williams (D) | |
| 45th (1877–1879) | James Williams (D) | |
| 46th (1879–1881) | Edward L. Martin (D) | |
| 47th (1881–1883) | Edward L. Martin (D) | |
| 48th (1883–1885) | Charles B. Lore (D) | |
| 49th (1885–1887) | Charles B. Lore (D) | |
| 50th (1887–1889) | John B. Penington (D) | |
| 51st (1889–1891) | John B. Penington (D) | |
| 52nd (1891–1893) | John W. Causey (D) | |
| 53rd (1893–1895) | John W. Causey (D) | |
| 54th (1895–1897) | Jonathan S. Willis (R) | |
| 55th (1897–1899) | L. Irving Handy (D) | |
| 56th (1899–1901) | John H. Hoffecker (R) (Note: Died June 16, 1900.) | |
| 56th (1899–1901) | Walter O. Hoffecker (R) (Note: Elected to fill vacancy caused by the death of John H. Hoffecker, seated December 3, 1900.) | |
| 57th (1901–1903) | L. Heisler Ball (R) (Note: Resigned March 3, 1903, to become U.S. Senator.) | |
| 58th (1903–1905) | Henry A. Houston (D) | |
| 59th (1905–1907) | Hiram R. Burton (R) | |
| 60th (1907–1909) | Hiram R. Burton (R) | |
| 61st (1909–1911) | William H. Heald (R) | |
| 62nd (1911–1913) | William H. Heald (R) | |
| 63rd (1913–1915) | Franklin Brockson (D) | |
| 64th (1915–1917) | Thomas W. Miller (R) | |
| 65th (1917–1919) | Albert F. Polk (D) | |
| 66th (1919–1921) | Caleb R. Layton (R) | |
| 67th (1921–1923) | Caleb R. Layton (R) | |
| 68th (1923–1925) | William H. Boyce (D) | |
| 69th (1925–1927) | Robert G. Houston (R) | |
| 70th (1927–1929) | Robert G. Houston (R) | |
| 71st (1929–1931) | Robert G. Houston (R) | |
| 72nd (1931–1933) | Robert G. Houston (R) | |
| 73rd (1933–1935) | Wilbur L. Adams (D) | |
| 74th (1935–1937) | J. George Stewart (R) | |
| 75th (1937–1939) | William F. Allen (D) | |
| 76th (1939–1941) | George S. Williams (R) | |
| 77th (1941–1943) | Philip A. Traynor (D) | |
| 78th (1943–1945) | Earle D. Willey (R) | |
| 79th (1945–1947) | Philip A. Traynor (D) | |
| 80th (1947–1949) | J. Caleb Boggs (R) | |
| 81st (1949–1951) | J. Caleb Boggs (R) | |
| 82nd (1951–1953) | J. Caleb Boggs (R) | |
| 83rd (1953–1955) | Herbert Warburton (R) | |
| 84th (1955–1957) | Harris McDowell (D) | |
| 85th (1957–1959) | Hal Haskell (R) | |
| 86th (1959–1961) | Harris McDowell (D) | |
| 87th (1961–1963) | Harris McDowell (D) | |
| 88th (1963–1965) | Harris McDowell (D) | |
| 89th (1965–1967) | Harris McDowell (D) | |
| 90th (1967–1969) | William Roth (R) (Note: Resigned December 31, 1970, to become U.S. Senator.) | |
| 91st (1969–1971) | William Roth (R) | |
| 92nd (1971–1973) | Pete du Pont (R) | |
| 93rd (1973–1975) | Pete du Pont (R) | |
| 94th (1975–1977) | Pete du Pont (R) | |
| 95th (1977–1979) | Thomas Evans (R) | |
| 96th (1979–1981) | Thomas Evans (R) | |
| 97th (1981–1983) | Thomas Evans (R) | |
| 98th (1983–1985) | Tom Carper (D) | |
| 99th (1985–1987) | Tom Carper (D) | |
| 100th (1987–1989) | Tom Carper (D) | |
| 101st (1989–1991) | Tom Carper (D) | |
| 102nd (1991–1993) | Tom Carper (D) | |
| 103rd (1993–1995) | Mike Castle (R) | |
| 104th (1995–1997) | Mike Castle (R) | |
| 105th (1997–1999) | Mike Castle (R) | |
| 106th (1999–2001) | Mike Castle (R) | |
| 107th (2001–2003) | Mike Castle (R) | |
| 108th (2003–2005) | Mike Castle (R) | |
| 109th (2005–2007) | Mike Castle (R) | |
| 110th (2007–2009) | Mike Castle (R) | |
| 111th (2009–2011) | Mike Castle (R) | |
| 112th (2011–2013) | John Carney (D) | |
| 113th (2013–2015) | John Carney (D) | |
| 114th (2015–2017) | John Carney (D) | |
| 115th (2017–2019) | Lisa Blunt Rochester (D) | |
| 116th (2019–2021) | Lisa Blunt Rochester (D) | |
| 117th (2021–2023) | Lisa Blunt Rochester (D) | |
| 118th (2023–2025) | Lisa Blunt Rochester (D) | |
| 119th (2025–2027) | Sarah McBride (D) | |
| 120th (2027–2029) | Sarah McBride (D) | |

== Key ==
Anti-Administration (AA)
Democratic (D)
Democratic-Republican (DR)
Federalist (F)
Pro-Administration (PA)
Jacksonian (J)
Know Nothing (KN)
National Republican (NR)
Republican (R)
Union (U)
Whig (W)

== See also ==
- List of United States congressional districts
- Delaware's congressional districts
- Political party strength in Delaware
