= 1806 United States House of Representatives election in Delaware =

- October 7, 1806
Candidate	James M. Broom	Thomas Fitzgerald
Party	Federalist	Democratic-Republican
Popular vote	2,353	830
Percentage	60.52%	21.35%
Candidate	Joseph Haslet	Thomas Montgomery
Party	Democratic-Republican	Democratic-Republican
Popular vote	382	323
Percentage	9.83%	8.31%
U.S. representative before election
James M. Broom
Federalist
Elected U.S. representative
James M. Broom
Federalist

The 1806 United States House of Representatives election in Delaware was held on October 7, 1806, to elect the U.S. representative from Delaware's at-large congressional district. Incumbent Federalist James M. Broom faced re-election to a full term after winning the previous year's special election. He was challenged by three Democratic-Republicans.

Broom was re-elected with over 60% of the vote, with neither opponent coming close to unseating him.

== Results ==
1806 United States House of Representatives election in Delaware
Party	Candidate	Votes	%
Federalist	James M. Broom (incumbent)	2,353	60.52
Democratic-Republican	Thomas Fitzgerald	830	21.35
Democratic-Republican	Joseph Haslet	382	9.83
Democratic-Republican	Thomas Montgomery	323	8.31
Majority		1,523	39.17
Total votes		3,888	100.00
Federalist hold			

=== Results by county ===
County	Broom#	Broom%	Fitzgerald#	Fitzgerald%	Haslet#	Haslet%	Montgomery#	Montgomery%	Total
Kent	709	95.94%					30	4.06%	739
New Castle	928	43.36%	830	38.79%	382	17.85%			2,140
Sussex	719	71.05%					293	28.95%	1,012

== See also ==
- 1807 Delaware's at-large congressional district special election
- 1806 and 1807 United States House of Representatives elections
- List of United States representatives from Delaware
