= List of United States representatives from Delaware =

This is a complete list of United States representatives from Delaware.

Elections are by a popular vote originally elected on the first Tuesday of October, but after 1831 on the first Tuesday after November 1. Terms began on the subsequent March 4 until 1935, from when they began on January 3.

Delaware has had only one U.S. representative, except for 10 years between 1813 and 1823, when there was a second U.S. representative. This person was elected statewide, at-large, on the same ballot as the first U.S. representative. The two candidates with the highest number of votes were elected.

== Current representative ==
- Delaware's at-large district: Sarah McBride (D): (since 2025)

== List of members ==
Member	Party	Years	Electoral history
John Vining	Pro-Administration	March 4, 1789 – March 3, 1793	Elected in 1789. Retired.
John Patten	Anti-Administration	March 4, 1793 – February 14, 1794	Elected in 1792. Lost election contest.
Henry Latimer	Pro-Administration	February 14, 1794 – February 7, 1795	Won election contest. Lost re-election.
John Patten	Democratic-Republican	March 4, 1795 – March 3, 1797	Elected in 1794. Retired.
James A. Bayard	Federalist	March 4, 1797 – March 3, 1803	Elected in 1796. Re-elected in 1798. Re-elected in 1800. Lost re-election.
Caesar A. Rodney	Democratic-Republican	March 4, 1803 – March 3, 1805	Elected in 1802. Lost re-election.
James M. Broom	Federalist	October 1, 1805 – October 6, 1807	Elected October 1, 1805 to finish Bayard's term and seated December 2, 1805. Re-elected in 1806, but declined the seat.
Nicholas Van Dyke	Federalist	October 6, 1807 – March 3, 1811	Elected in 1806. Re-elected in 1808. Retired.
Henry M. Ridgely	Federalist	March 4, 1811 – March 3, 1815	Elected in 1810. Retired.
Thomas Cooper	Federalist	March 4, 1813 – March 3, 1817	Elected in 1812. Re-elected in 1814. Lost re-election.
Willard Hall	Democratic-Republican	March 4, 1817 – January 22, 1821	Elected in 1816. Re-elected in 1818. Lost re-election and resigned early.
Caesar A. Rodney	Democratic-Republican	March 4, 1821 – January 24, 1822	Elected in 1820. Resigned when elected U.S. senator.
Daniel Rodney	Federalist	October 1, 1822 – March 3, 1823	Elected to finish his cousin's term. Retired.
Thomas Clayton	Federalist	March 4, 1815 – March 3, 1817	Elected in 1814. Lost re-election.
Louis McLane	Federalist	March 4, 1817 – March 3, 1825	Elected in 1816. Re-elected in 1818. Re-elected in 1820. Re-elected in 1822. Re-elected in 1824. Re-elected in 1826 but declined to serve having been elected U.S. senator.
Louis McLane	Jacksonian	March 4, 1825 – March 3, 1827	Elected in 1816. Re-elected in 1818. Re-elected in 1820. Re-elected in 1822. Re-elected in 1824. Re-elected in 1826 but declined to serve having been elected U.S. senator.
Kensey Johns Jr.	Anti-Jacksonian	October 2, 1827 – March 3, 1831	Elected to finish McLane's term. Retired.
John J. Milligan	Anti-Jacksonian	March 4, 1831 – March 3, 1837	Elected in 1830. Lost re-election to Robinson Jr.
John J. Milligan	Whig	March 4, 1837 – March 3, 1839	Elected in 1830. Lost re-election to Robinson Jr.
Thomas Robinson Jr.	Democratic	March 4, 1839 – March 3, 1841	Elected in 1838. Lost re-election to Rodney.
George B. Rodney	Whig	March 4, 1841 – March 3, 1845	Elected in 1840. Retired.
John W. Houston	Whig	March 4, 1845 – March 3, 1851	Elected in 1844. Retired.
George R. Riddle	Democratic	March 4, 1851 – March 3, 1855	Elected in 1850. Lost re-election to Cullen.
Elisha D. Cullen	Know Nothing	March 4, 1855 – March 3, 1857	Elected in 1854. Lost re-election to Whiteley.
William G. Whiteley	Democratic	March 4, 1857 – March 3, 1861	Elected in 1856. Retired.
George P. Fisher	People's	March 4, 1861 – March 3, 1863	Elected in 1860. Lost re-election to Temple.
William Temple	Democratic	March 4, 1863 – May 28, 1863	Elected in 1862. Died.
Nathaniel B. Smithers	Union	December 7, 1863 – March 3, 1865	Elected to finish Temple's term. Lost re-election to Nicholson.
John A. Nicholson	Democratic	March 4, 1865 – March 3, 1869	Elected in 1864. Retired.
Benjamin T. Biggs	Democratic	March 4, 1869 – March 3, 1873	Elected in 1868. Retired.
James R. Lofland	Republican	March 4, 1873 – March 3, 1875	Elected in 1872. Lost re-election to J. Williams.
James Williams	Democratic	March 4, 1875 – March 3, 1879	Elected in 1874. Retired.
Edward L. Martin	Democratic	March 4, 1879 – March 3, 1883	Elected in 1878. Retired.
Charles B. Lore	Democratic	March 4, 1883 – March 3, 1887	Elected in 1882. Retired.
John B. Penington	Democratic	March 4, 1887 – March 3, 1891	Elected in 1886. Retired.
John W. Causey	Democratic	March 4, 1891 – March 3, 1895	Elected in 1890. Retired.
Jonathan S. Willis	Republican	March 4, 1895 – March 3, 1897	Elected in 1894. Lost re-election to Handy.
L. Irving Handy	Democratic	March 4, 1897 – March 3, 1899	Elected in 1896. Lost re-election to Hoffecker.
John H. Hoffecker	Republican	March 4, 1899 – June 16, 1900	Elected in 1898. Died.
Walter O. Hoffecker	Republican	November 6, 1900 – March 3, 1901	Elected to finish his father's term. Retired.
L. Heisler Ball	Republican	March 4, 1901 – March 3, 1903	Elected in 1900. Retired to run for U.S. senator.
Henry A. Houston	Democratic	March 4, 1903 – March 3, 1905	Elected in 1902. Retired.
Hiram R. Burton	Republican	March 4, 1905 – March 3, 1909	Elected in 1904. Lost renomination to Heald.
William H. Heald	Republican	March 4, 1909 – March 3, 1913	Elected in 1908. Retired.
Franklin Brockson	Democratic	March 4, 1913 – March 3, 1915	Elected in 1912. Lost re-election to Miller.
Thomas W. Miller	Republican	March 4, 1915 – March 3, 1917	Elected in 1914. Lost re-election to Polk.
Albert F. Polk	Democratic	March 4, 1917 – March 3, 1919	Elected in 1916. Lost re-election to Layton.
Caleb R. Layton	Republican	March 4, 1919 – March 3, 1923	Elected in 1918. Lost re-election to Boyce.
William H. Boyce	Democratic	March 4, 1923 – March 3, 1925	Elected in 1922. Lost re-election to Houston.
Robert G. Houston	Republican	March 4, 1925 – March 3, 1933	Elected in 1924. Retired.
Wilbur L. Adams	Democratic	March 4, 1933 – January 3, 1935	Elected in 1932. Retired to run for U.S. senator.
J. George Stewart	Republican	January 3, 1935 – January 3, 1937	Elected in 1934. Lost re-election to Allen.
William F. Allen	Democratic	January 3, 1937 – January 3, 1939	Elected in 1936. Lost re-election to G. Williams.
George S. Williams	Republican	January 3, 1939 – January 3, 1941	Elected in 1938. Lost re-election to Traynor.
Philip A. Traynor	Democratic	January 3, 1941 – January 3, 1943	Elected in 1940. Lost re-election to Willey.
Earle D. Willey	Republican	January 3, 1943 – January 3, 1945	Elected in 1942. Lost re-election to Traynor.
Philip A. Traynor	Democratic	January 3, 1945 – January 3, 1947	Elected in 1944. Lost reelection to Boggs.
J. Caleb Boggs	Republican	January 3, 1947 – January 3, 1953	Elected in 1946. Retired to run for Governor of Delaware.
Herbert Warburton	Republican	January 3, 1953 – January 3, 1955	Elected in 1952. Retired to run for U.S. senator.
Harris McDowell	Democratic	January 3, 1955 – January 3, 1957	Elected in 1954. Lost re-election to Haskell.
Harry G. Haskell Jr.	Republican	January 3, 1957 – January 3, 1959	Elected in 1956. Lost re-election to McDowell.
Harris McDowell	Democratic	January 3, 1959 – January 3, 1967	Elected in 1958. Lost re-election to Roth.
William Roth	Republican	January 3, 1967 – December 31, 1970	Elected in 1966. Retired to run for U.S. senator and resigned after the election.
Pete du Pont	Republican	January 3, 1971 – January 3, 1977	Elected in 1970. Retired to run for Governor of Delaware.
Thomas B. Evans Jr.	Republican	January 3, 1977 – January 3, 1983	Elected in 1976. Lost re-election to Carper.
Tom Carper	Democratic	January 3, 1983 – January 3, 1993	Elected in 1982. Retired to run for Governor of Delaware.
Mike Castle	Republican	January 3, 1993 – January 3, 2011	Elected in 1992. Retired to run for U.S. senator.
John Carney	Democratic	January 3, 2011 – January 3, 2017	Elected in 2010. Retired to run for Governor of Delaware.
Lisa Blunt Rochester	Democratic	January 3, 2017 – January 3, 2025	Elected in 2016. Retired to run for U.S. senator
Sarah McBride	Democratic	January 3, 2025 – present	Elected in 2024. Incumbent.

== See also ==
- Delaware's congressional delegations
- Delaware's congressional districts
- List of United States senators from Delaware
