= Thomas W. Miller =

American politician (1886–1973)

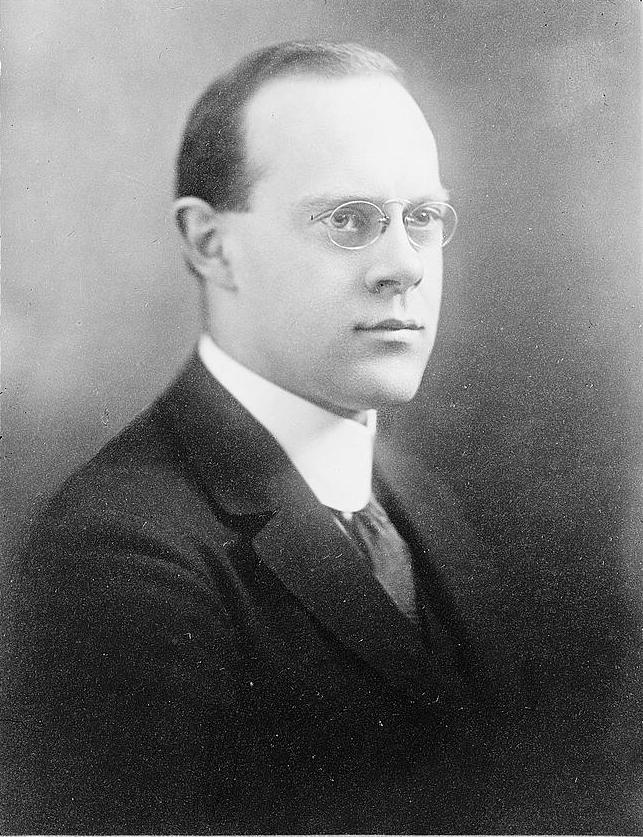

Member of the U.S. House of Representatives from Delaware's at-large district
- In office March 4, 1915 – March 3, 1917
- Preceded by: Franklin Brockson
- Succeeded by: Albert F. Polk

Personal details
- Born: Thomas Woodnutt Miller; June 26, 1886 Wilmington, Delaware, U.S.
- Died: May 5, 1973 (aged 86) Reno, Nevada, U.S.
- Party: Republican
- Relatives: Charles R. Miller (father)
- Education: Yale University (BA)

Military service
- Allegiance: United States
- Branch/service: United States Army
- Years of service: 1917–1919
- Rank: Lieutenant Colonel
- Battles/wars: World War I • Meuse–Argonne offensive (WIA) • Defensive Sector
- Awards: Purple Heart

Thomas Woodnutt Miller (June 26, 1886 – May 5, 1973) was an American politician serving as a Republican U.S. representative for Delaware's at-large congressional district. He was a veteran of World War I and a member of the American Legion, who served as a National Legislative Committee chairman.

== Early life and education ==
Thomas Woodnutt Miller was born in Wilmington, Delaware, son of Governor Charles R. Miller and Abigail Morgan (Woodnutt) Miller. He attended the Hotchkiss School and graduated from Yale University in 1908. He was initially employed as a steel roller by the Bethlehem Steel Company in 1908 and 1909.

== Political career ==
Miller worked as secretary to U.S. Representative William H. Heald from 1910 until 1912, and during this period studied law in Washington, D.C. He was appointed by his father, Governor Charles R. Miller, to the position of Delaware Secretary of State from 1913 until 1915.

Miller was elected to the United States House of Representatives in 1914, defeating incumbent Democratic U.S. Representative Franklin Brockson. During this term, he served in the Republican minority in the 64th Congress. Seeking reelection in 1916, he lost to Democrat Albert F. Polk, a lawyer from Georgetown. Miller served from March 4, 1915, until March 3, 1917, during the administration of U.S. President Woodrow Wilson.

== World War I ==
When the United States entered World War I in April 1917 (see American entry into World War I), Miller enlisted as a private in the infantry of the United States Army, and served in France with the Seventy-Ninth Division. He was cited by General John J. Pershing, commander of the American Expeditionary Forces (AEF), for "especially meritorious and conspicuous service" in the Meuse–Argonne offensive and awarded the Purple Heart for his service. For this, he was promoted to lieutenant colonel and served until discharged in September 1919. Miller was a founder and incorporator of the American Legion and vice chairman of the Paris caucus in March 1919. He was also Alien Property Custodian from 1921 until 1925 and a member of the American Battle Monuments Commission from 1923 until 1926. He was elected president of FIDAC (The Interallied Federation of War Veterans Organisations) between 1924 and 1925.

== Conviction and parole ==
Miller served in the administration of United States President Warren G. Harding, but was convicted in 1927 on two counts of conspiring to defraud the U.S. government. The conviction concerned Miller's service as Alien Property Custodian and the effort by Metallgesellschaft AG of Germany to overturn the U.S. government's confiscation of its interest in the American Metal Company during World War I. He served 18 months in prison and was paroled in 1929 and pardoned by United States President Herbert Hoover in 1933.

== Later life and death ==
At this point, Miller moved to Reno, Nevada, where he spent the rest of his life. There he founded the Nevada state parks system and served as chairman of the Nevada State Park Commission in 1935 and 1936, from 1953 to 1959, and from 1967 to 1973. He also continued his activity in veterans affairs as staff field representative of the United States Veterans Employment Service from 1945 until 1957. He died in Reno on May 5, 1973, and was buried in the Masonic Memorial Gardens.

== Personal life ==
His nephew, Clement W. Miller, was a U.S. representative from California from 1959 until 1962.

== Almanac ==
Elections are held the first Tuesday after November 1. U.S. Representatives took office March 4 and have a two-year term.

Public Offices
Office	Type	Location	Began office	Ended office	notes
Secretary of State of Delaware	Executive	Dover	1913	1915	Delaware
U.S. Representative	Legislature	Washington	March 4, 1915	March 3, 1917	

United States Congressional service
Dates	Congress	Chamber	Majority	President	Committees	Class/District
1915–1917	64th	U.S. House	Democratic	Woodrow Wilson		At-large

Election results
Year	Office	Subject	Party	Votes	%	Opponent	Party	Votes	%
1914	U.S. Representative	Thomas W. Miller	Republican	22,922	50%	Franklin Brockson	Democratic	20,681	45%
1916	U.S. Representative	Thomas W. Miller	Republican	24,202	47%	Albert F. Polk	Democratic	24,395	48%

== See also ==
- List of members of the American Legion
- List of people from Delaware
- List of Yale University people
- List of people pardoned or granted clemency by the president of the United States

U.S. House of Representatives
Preceded by Franklin Brockson	Member of the U.S. House of Representatives from Delaware's at-large congressional district 1915–1917	Succeeded by Albert F. Polk
