= Hiram R. Burton =

American politician (1841–1927)

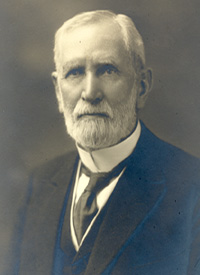

Member of the U.S. House of Representatives from Delaware's at-large district
- In office March 4, 1905 – March 3, 1909
- Preceded by: Henry A. Houston
- Succeeded by: William H. Heald

Personal details
- Born: November 13, 1841 Lewes, Delaware, U.S.
- Died: June 17, 1927 (aged 85) Lewes, Delaware, U.S.
- Party: Republican
- Spouse: Virginia Rawlins
- Education: University of Pennsylvania
- Profession: Physician

Hiram Rodney Burton (November 13, 1841 – June 17, 1927) was an American physician and politician from Lewes, in Sussex County, Delaware. A member of the Republican Party, Burton served two terms as Delaware's at-large U.S. representative from 1905 to 1909.

== Early life and family ==
Burton was born in Lewes, Delaware. His mother was Ruth Hunn Rodney. He attended St. Peter's Academy at Lewes, taught for two years in the schools in Sussex County, and engaged in the dry goods business in Washington, D.C., from 1862 until 1865. Burton graduated from the medical department of the University of Pennsylvania in Philadelphia in 1868 and practiced medicine in Frankford, Delaware, from 1868 until 1872, when he moved back to Lewes.

== Professional and political career ==
From 1877 until 1888, Burton was the deputy collector of customs for the port of Lewes and was acting assistant surgeon in the Marine Hospital Service from 1890 until 1893. He ran unsuccessfully for the State Senate in 1898 and served as a delegate to the Republican National Convention in 1896, 1900, and 1908.

Burton was elected to the U.S. House of Representatives in 1904 and was reelected in 1906. During these terms, he served in the Republican majority in the 59th and 60th Congress, during the administration of President Theodore Roosevelt. He sought reelection in 1908 but lost his party's nomination to lawyer William H. Heald, who went on to win the general election and serve in Congress. Burton served two terms, from March 4, 1905, until March 3, 1909. After departing office, he resumed the practice of medicine in Lewes.

== Death and legacy ==
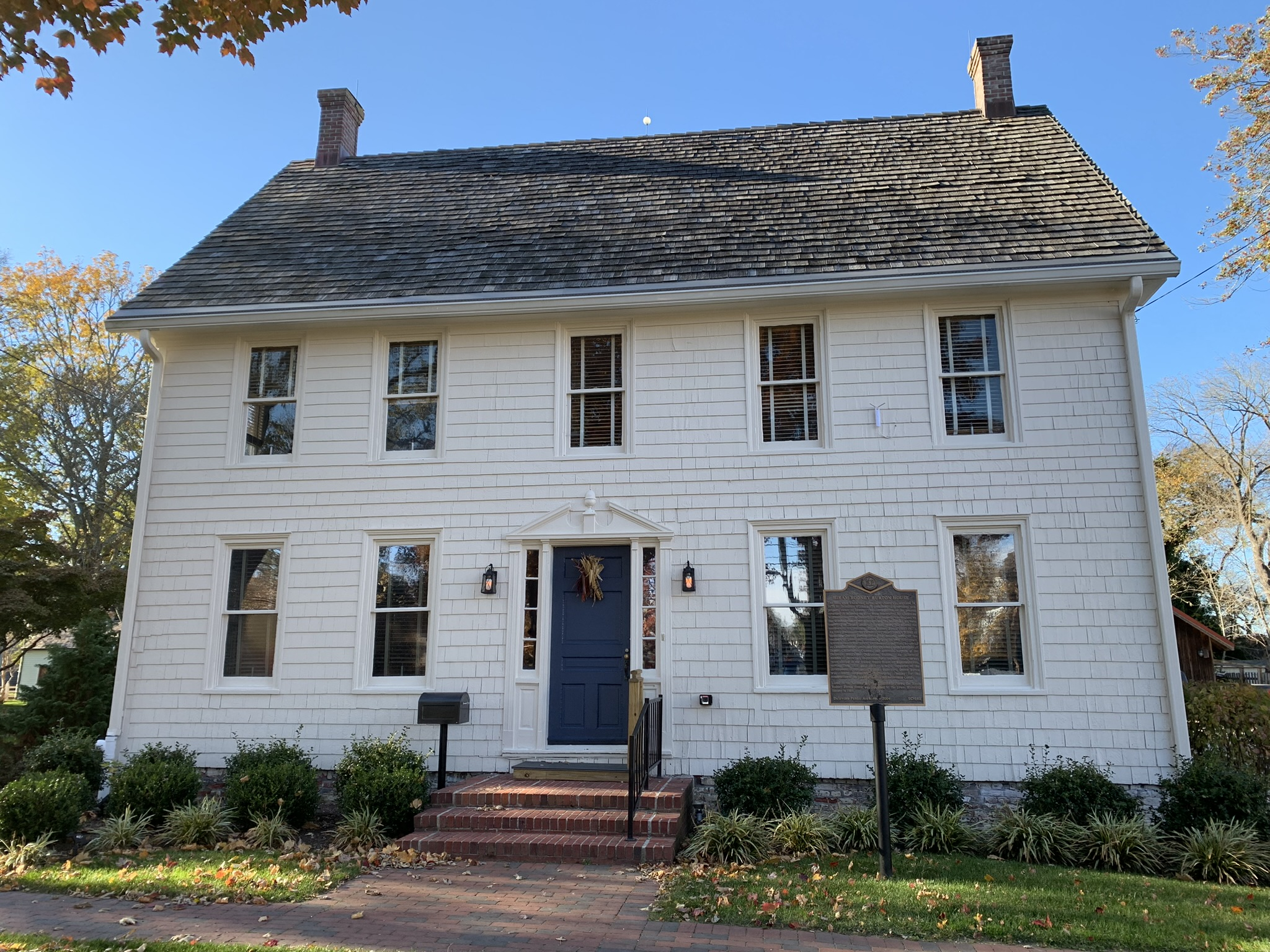
Hiram R. Burton's house in Lewes

Burton died at Lewes and is buried in the St. Paul's Episcopal Churchyard in Georgetown, Delaware. His home at Lewes is owned by the Lewes Historical Society and is open to the public.

== Almanac ==
Congressional elections were held the first Tuesday after November 1. U.S. Representatives took office March 4 and had a two-year term.

Public Offices
Office	Type	Location	Began office	Ended office	notes
U.S. Representative	Legislature	Washington	March 4, 1905	March 3, 1907	
U.S. Representative	Legislature	Washington	March 4, 1907	March 3, 1909	

United States Congressional service
Dates	Congress	Chamber	Majority	President	Committees	Class/District
1905–1907	59th	U.S. House	Republican	Theodore Roosevelt		at-large
1907–1909	60th	U.S. House	Republican	Theodore Roosevelt		at-large

Election results
Year	Office	Subject	Party	Votes	%	Opponent	Party	Votes	%
1904	U.S. Representative	Hiram R. Burton	Republican	23,512	54%	Edward D. Hearne	Democratic	19,552	45%
1906	U.S. Representative	Hiram R. Burton	Republican	20,210	53%	David T. Marvel	Democratic	17,118	45%
1912	U.S. Representative	Hiram R. Burton	Republican	5,497	11%	Franklin Brockson; George Hall; Louis A. Drexler	Democratic; Republican; Independent	22,485; 16,740; 2,825	47% 35% 6%

== Images ==
- Hiram Rodney Burton House

== Places with more information ==
- Delaware Historical Society; website; 505 North Market Street, Wilmington, Delaware 19801; (302) 655-7161.
- University of Delaware; Library website; 181 South College Avenue, Newark, Delaware 19717; (302) 831-2965.
- Newark Free Library; 750 Library Ave., Newark, Delaware; (302) 731-7550.

Party political offices
First	Progressive nominee for U.S. Senator from Delaware (Class 1); 1916	Succeeded by None
U.S. House of Representatives
Preceded by Henry A. Houston	Member of the U.S. House of Representatives from Delaware's at-large congressional district 1905–1909	Succeeded by William H. Heald
