= Albert F. Polk =

American politician

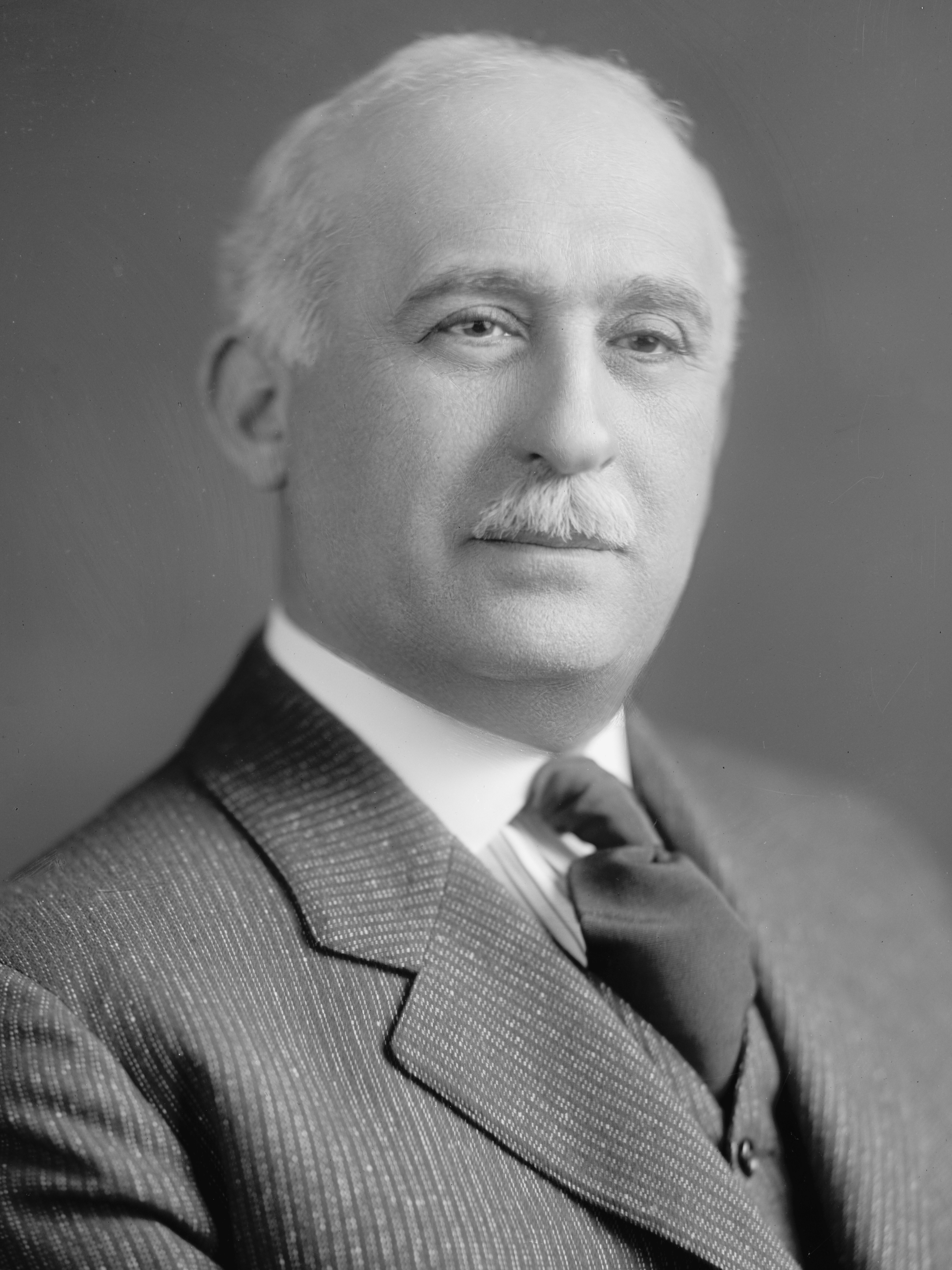

Member of the U.S. House of Representatives from Delaware's at-large district
- In office March 4, 1917 – March 3, 1919
- Preceded by: Thomas W. Miller
- Succeeded by: Caleb R. Layton

Personal details
- Born: October 11, 1869 Frederica, Delaware, U.S.
- Died: February 14, 1955 (aged 85) Wilmington, Delaware, U.S.
- Party: Democratic
- Education: Delaware College
- Profession: Lawyer

Albert Fawcett Polk (October 11, 1869 – February 14, 1955) was an American lawyer and politician from Georgetown, in Sussex County, Delaware, and later Wilmington, Delaware. He was a member of the Democratic Party, and served as U.S. Representative from Delaware.

== Early life and family ==
Polk was born in Frederica, Delaware. He attended Delaware College, now the University of Delaware, in Newark, graduating in 1889. Afterwards, he studied the law, was admitted to the Delaware Bar in 1892, and began a practice in Georgetown.

== Professional career ==
In 1899 Polk became an attorney for the Delaware State Senate and in 1902 become the chairman of the Sussex County Democratic Committee. He held this position until 1908 and again in 1915–1916. At the same time, he was a member of the Democratic State Committee. He became a member of the Georgetown Board of Education in 1905 and served there until 1912. From 1914 until 1921 he was a member and secretary of the Board of Law Examiners of the Sussex County.

Polk was elected to the U.S. House of Representatives in 1916, defeating incumbent Republican U.S. Representative Thomas W. Miller. During this term, he served with the Democratic majority in the 65th Congress. Seeking reelection in 1918, he lost to Republican Caleb R. Layton, a physician from Georgetown. Polk served from March 4, 1917, until March 3, 1919, during the administration of U.S. President Woodrow Wilson.

Polk resumed the practice of law, moving his practice to Wilmington in 1921. He was appointed United States Commissioner for the District of Delaware in 1929 and held the position until his retirement in 1951.

== Death and legacy ==
Polk died at Wilmington, Delaware. He is buried in the Union Cemetery, located at South Race Street, Georgetown.

== Almanac ==
Elections are held the first Tuesday after November 1. U.S. Representatives took office March 4 and have a two-year term.

Public Offices
Office	Type	Location	Began office	Ended office	notes
U.S. Representative	Legislature	Washington	March 4, 1917	March 3, 1919	

United States Congressional service
Dates	Congress	Chamber	Majority	President	Committees	Class/District
1917–1919	65th	U.S. House	Democratic	Woodrow Wilson		at-large

Election results
Year	Office	Subject	Party	Votes	%	Opponent	Party	Votes	%
1916	U.S. Representative	Albert F. Polk	Democratic	24,395	48%	Thomas W. Miller	Republican	24,202	47%
1918	U.S. Representative	Albert F. Polk	Democratic	19,652	48%	Caleb R. Layton	Republican	21,226	51%

== Images ==
- Biographical Dictionary of the U.S. Congress

== Places with more information ==
- Delaware Historical Society; website; 505 North Market Street, Wilmington, Delaware 19801; (302) 655-7161.
- University of Delaware; Library website; 181 South College Avenue, Newark, Delaware 19717; (302) 831-2965.
- Hagley Museum and Library website; Barley Mill Road, Wilmington, Delaware; (302) 658-2400.
- Newark Free Library; 750 Library Ave., Newark, Delaware; (302) 731-7550.

U.S. House of Representatives
Preceded by Thomas W. Miller	Member of the U.S. House of Representatives from Delaware's at-large congressional district 1917–1919	Succeeded by Caleb R. Layton
