= Henry A. Houston =

American politician

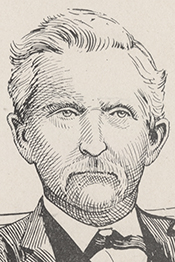

Member of the U.S. House of Representatives from Delaware's at-large district
- In office March 4, 1903 – March 3, 1905
- Preceded by: L. Heisler Ball
- Succeeded by: Hiram R. Burton

Personal details
- Born: July 10, 1847 Dagsboro Hundred, Sussex County, Delaware, U.S.
- Died: April 5, 1925 (aged 77) Milford, Delaware, U.S.
- Party: Democratic
- Education: Newark Academy
- Occupation: Businessman

Henry Aydelotte Houston (July 10, 1847 – April 5, 1925) was an American teacher, businessman and politician, from Millsboro, in Sussex County, Delaware. He was a member of the Democratic Party, who served as U.S. Representative from Delaware. "Houston" is pronounced "house-ton", unlike the city in Texas with the same spelling.

== Early life and family ==
Houston was born in Dagsboro Hundred, Sussex County, Delaware. He attended the Newark Academy, now the University of Delaware. He lived in Missouri from 1872 until 1875, when he returned to Millsboro.

== Professional and political career ==
After teaching school for five years, Houston engaged in mercantile pursuits, lumber manufacturing, and banking. At one time, he was a member of the Sussex County School Commission.

Houston was elected to the U.S. House of Representatives in 1902 and served a single term in the Democratic minority of the 58th Congress. He did not seek reelection in 1904, and served one term, from March 4, 1903, until March 3, 1905, during the administration of U.S. President Theodore Roosevelt.

== Death and legacy ==
Houston died at Milford, Delaware, and is buried in the Brotherhood Cemetery at Millsboro.

== Electoral history ==
Election results
Year	Office	Subject	Party	Votes	%	Opponent	Party	Votes	%
1902	U.S. Representative	Henry A. Houston	Democratic	16,396	43%	William A. Byrne; L. Heisler Ball	Republican; Republican	12,998; 8,028	34% 21%

== Places with more information ==
- Delaware Historical Society; website; 505 North Market Street, Wilmington, Delaware 19801; (302) 655-7161.
- Hagley Museum and Library website; Barley Mill Road, Wilmington, Delaware; (302) 658-2400.
- University of Delaware; Library website; 181 South College Avenue, Newark, Delaware 19717; (302) 831-2965.
- Newark Free Library; 750 Library Ave., Newark, Delaware; (302) 731–7550.

U.S. House of Representatives
Preceded by L. Heisler Ball	Member of the U.S. House of Representatives from Delaware's at-large congressional district 1903–1905	Succeeded by Hiram R. Burton
