= Franklin Brockson =

American politician (1865–1942)

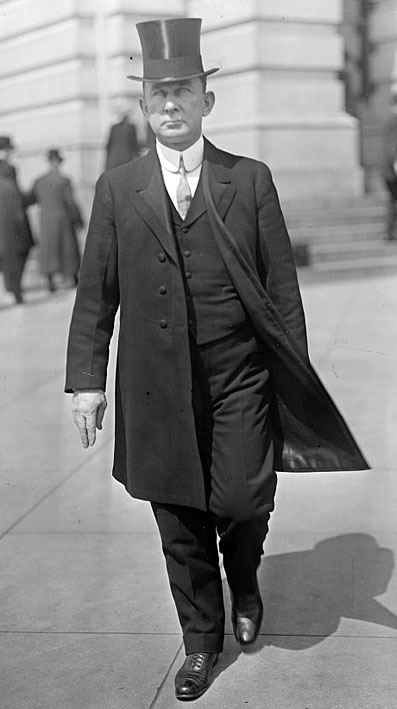
- Brockson in 1913

Member of the U.S. House of Representatives from Delaware's at-large district
- In office March 4, 1913 – March 3, 1915
- Preceded by: William H. Heald
- Succeeded by: Thomas W. Miller

Personal details
- Born: August 6, 1865 New Castle County, Delaware, US
- Died: March 16, 1942 (aged 76) Clayton, Delaware, US
- Party: Democratic
- Education: Washington and Lee University
- Occupation: Lawyer

Franklin Brockson (August 6, 1865 – March 16, 1942) was an American lawyer and politician from Wilmington in New Castle County, Delaware. He was a member of the Democratic Party, who served in the Delaware General Assembly and as U.S. Representative from Delaware.

== Early life and family ==
Brockson was born in Blackbird Hundred, New Castle County, Delaware. He graduated from the Wilmington Conference Academy at Dover (later Wesley College) in 1890.

== Professional and political career ==
Brockson began his career as a teacher and principal in the public schools at Port Penn and Marshallton. He studied the law and graduated from the law department of Washington and Lee University in Lexington, Virginia, in 1896, when he was admitted to the bar, and commenced practice in Wilmington. In 1908 Brockson was elected to the Delaware House of Representatives for the 1909–10 session.

Brockson was elected to the U.S. House of Representatives in 1912. During this term, he served in the Democratic majority in the 63rd Congress. He was a supporter during that time of corporal punishment. Seeking reelection in 1914, he lost to Republican Thomas W. Miller, a lawyer from Wilmington, and son of the incumbent Governor, Charles R. Miller. Brockson served from March 4, 1913, until March 3, 1915, during the administration of U.S. President Woodrow Wilson. He then resumed the practice of law in Clayton and Wilmington.

== Death and legacy ==
Brockson died at Clayton on March 16, 1942, and is buried in the Odd Fellows Cemetery at Smyrna, Delaware.

== Almanac ==
Elections are held the first Tuesday after November 1. Members of the General Assembly take office the second Tuesday of January. State Representatives have a two-year term. U.S. Representatives took office March 4 and also have a two-year term.

Public offices
Office	Type	Location	Began office	Ended office	Notes
State Representative	Legislature	Dover	January 14, 1909	January 11, 1911	
U.S. Representative	Legislature	Washington	March 4, 1913	March 3, 1915	

United States Congressional service
Dates	Congress	Chamber	Majority	President	Committees	Class/District
1913–1915	63rd	U.S. House	Democratic	Woodrow Wilson.		at-large

Election results
Year	Office	Subject	Party	Votes	%	Opponent	Party	Votes	%
1912	U.S. Representative	Franklin Brockson	Democratic	22,485	47%	George Hall; Hiram R. Burton; Louis A. Drexler	Republican; Republican; Independent	16,740; 5,497; 2,825	35% 11% 6%
1914	U.S. Representative	Franklin Brockson	Democratic	20,681	45%	Thomas W. Miller	Republican	22,922	50%

U.S. House of Representatives
Preceded by William H. Heald	Member of the U.S. House of Representatives from Delaware's at-large congressional district 1913–1915	Succeeded by Thomas W. Miller
