= James M. Broom =

American lawyer and politician

James Madison Broom
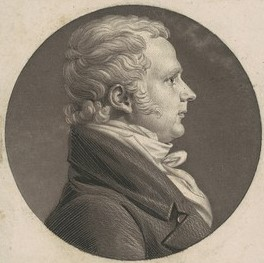

Member of the U.S. House of Representatives from Delaware's at-large district
- In office March 4, 1805 – 1807
- Preceded by: Caesar A. Rodney
- Succeeded by: Nicholas Van Dyke

Personal details
- Born: 1776 Newport, Delaware
- Died: January 15, 1850 (aged 73–74) Philadelphia, Pennsylvania, U.S.
- Party: Federalist
- Education: Princeton College
- Profession: Lawyer

James Madison Broom (1776 – January 15, 1850) was an American lawyer and politician from Wilmington, in New Castle County, Delaware. He was a member of the Federalist Party, who served as a U. S. Representative from Delaware.

== Early life and family ==
Broom was born in Wilmington, Delaware, the son of Delaware politician Jacob Broom and Rachel Pierce. James was born near Wilmington, Delaware. His first wife's name was Ann who died August 9, 1808, and he may have remarried Mary Lowber. By his first wife he has two children, Elizabeth and Jacob, a Congressman from Pennsylvania. James Broom graduated from Princeton College in 1794. He then studied law, was admitted to the Delaware Bar in 1801 and practiced law in New Castle, Wilmington, and Baltimore, Maryland.

== Professional and political career ==
Broom was elected as a Federalist to the 9th and 10th Congresses, serving from March 4, 1805, until his resignation in 1807, before the assembling of the 10th Congress. He moved to Philadelphia, Pennsylvania, in 1819 and resumed the practice of law. Later, he served as a member of the Pennsylvania House of Representatives in 1824.

== Death and legacy ==
He died in Philadelphia on January 15, 1850, and was buried in Saint Mary's Churchyard in Hamilton Village, now a part of Philadelphia, Pennsylvania.

== Almanac ==
Elections were held the first Tuesday of October. U.S. Representatives took office March 4 and have a two-year term.

Public offices
Office	Type	Location	Party	Began office	Ended office	Notes
U.S. Representative	Legislature	Washington	Federalist	March 4, 1805	1807	

United States Congressional service
Dates	Congress	Chamber	Majority	President	Committees	Class/District
1805–1807	9th	U.S. House	Republican	Thomas Jefferson		at-large
1807–1809	10th	U.S. House	Republican	Thomas Jefferson		at-large

Election results
Year	Office	Subject	Party	votes	%	Opponent	Party	votes	%	Notes
1804	U.S. Representative	David Hall	Republican	2,682	47%	James M. Broom	Federalist	3,010	53%	(Note: This was a special election to fill the vacancy caused by the resignation of James A. Bayard Sr.) (Note: An additional candidate was Isaac H. Starr (24).)
1806	U.S. Representative	Thomas Fitzgerald	Republican	830	21%	James M. Broom	Federalist	2,353	61%	(Note: Additional candidates were Joseph Haslet (382) and Thomas Montgomery (323).)

== Places with more information ==
- Delaware Historical Society; website; 505 North Market Street, Wilmington, Delaware 19801; (302) 655-7161
- University of Delaware; Library website; 181 South College Avenue, Newark, Delaware 19717; (302) 831-2965

U.S. House of Representatives
Preceded by Caesar A. Rodney	Member of the U.S. House of Representatives from Delaware's at-large congressional district March 4, 1805 – 1807	Succeeded by Nicholas Van Dyke
