= William H. Heald =

American politician (1864–1939)

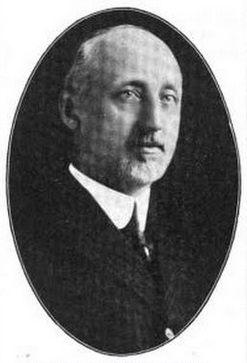
- From the December 1913 issue of Marine Review magazine.

Member of the U.S. House of Representatives from Delaware's at-large district
- In office March 4, 1909 – March 3, 1913
- Preceded by: Hiram R. Burton
- Succeeded by: Franklin Brockson

Personal details
- Born: August 27, 1864 Wilmington, Delaware, U.S.
- Died: June 3, 1939 (aged 74) Wilmington, Delaware, U.S.
- Party: Republican
- Education: University of Delaware
- Profession: Lawyer

William Henry Heald (August 27, 1864 – June 3, 1939) was an American banker, lawyer and politician, from Wilmington, in New Castle County, Delaware. He was a member of the Republican Party, and served two terms as U.S. Representative from Delaware.

== Early life and family ==
Heald was born in Wilmington. He graduated from the University of Delaware in 1883 and from the law department of George Washington University in Washington, D.C., in 1888.

== Professional and political career ==
Heald was a national bank examiner in Montana, Idaho, Washington, and Oregon from 1888 until 1892, when he was admitted to the bar in Wilmington in 1897. He was appointed Postmaster for Wilmington from 1901 until 1905.

Heald was elected to the U.S. House of Representatives in 1908 and won election again in 1910. During these terms, he served in the Republican majority in the 61st Congress and in the minority in the 62nd Congress. He did not seek reelection in 1912 and served two terms, from March 4, 1909, until March 3, 1913. This was during the administration of U.S. President William H. Taft.

Subsequently, he resumed the practice of law and was engaged in banking. He was a member of the Board of Trustees of the University of Delaware from 1915 until 1939 and was president of that board from 1936 until his death.

== Death and legacy ==
Heald died at Wilmington and is buried there in the Wilmington and Brandywine Cemetery.

== Almanac ==
Elections are held the first Tuesday after November 1. U.S. Representatives took office March 4 and have a two-year term.

Public Offices
Office	Type	Location	Began office	Ended office	notes
U.S. Representative	Legislature	Washington	March 4, 1909	March 3, 1911	
U.S. Representative	Legislature	Washington	March 4, 1911	March 3, 1913	

United States Congressional service
Dates	Congress	Chamber	Majority	President	Committees	Class/District
1909–1911	61st	U.S. House	Republican	William H. Taft		at-large
1911–1913	62nd	U.S. House	Republican	William H. Taft		at-large

Election results
Year	Office	Subject	Party	Votes	%	Opponent	Party	Votes	%
1908	U.S. Representative	William H. Heald	Republican	24,314	51%	L. Irving Handy	Democratic	22,515	47%
1910	U.S. Representative	William H. Heald	Republican	22,410	51%	Robert C. White	Democratic	20,281	47%

U.S. House of Representatives
Preceded by Hiram R. Burton	Member of the U.S. House of Representatives from Delaware's at-large congressional district 1909–1913	Succeeded by Franklin Brockson
