= Elections in Delaware =

Delaware has three county boards of election which are charged with the calculation and certification of election results, election dispute resolution, validation of qualified voter rolls and of materials used during elections, such as voting machines. Delaware also has a State Election Commissioner who is appointed by the Governor and confirmed by the Delaware Senate.

In a 2020 study, Delaware was ranked as the 18th hardest state for citizens to vote in.

== Elections ==
=== 2026 election ===
- 2026 U.S. Senate
- 2026 U.S. House
- 2026 Attorney General
- 2026 State Treasurer

=== 2024 election ===
- 2024 presidential election
- 2024 U.S. Senate
- 2024 U.S. House
- 2024 gubernatorial
- 2024 lieutenant gubernatorial
- 2024 New Castle County Executive
- 2024 Wilmington mayoral

=== 2022 elections ===
- 2022 U.S. House
- 2022 Attorney General
- 2022 State Treasurer

=== 2020 elections ===
- 2020 presidential election
- 2020 Democratic presidential primary
- 2020 Republican presidential primary
- 2020 U.S. Senate
- 2020 U.S. House
- 2020 gubernatorial
- 2020 lieutenant gubernatorial
- 2020 New Castle County Executive
- 2020 Wilmington mayoral

=== 2018 elections ===
- 2018 U.S. Senate
- 2018 U.S. House
- 2018 Attorney General
- 2018 State Treasurer
- 2018 Delaware House of Representatives
- 2018 Delaware elections

=== 2016 elections ===
- 2016 presidential election
- 2016 Democratic presidential primary
- 2016 U.S. House
- 2016 gubernatorial
- 2016 lieutenant gubernatorial
- 2016 New Castle County Executive
- 2016 Wilmington mayoral

=== 2014 elections ===
- 2014 U.S. Senate
- 2014 U.S. House
- 2014 Delaware elections

=== 2012 elections ===
- 2012 presidential election
- 2012 U.S. Senate
- 2012 U.S. House
- 2012 gubernatorial
- 2012 lieutenant gubernatorial
- 2012 Wilmington mayoral

=== 2010 elections ===
- 2010 U.S. Senate
- 2010 U.S. House
- 2010 U.S. House
- 2010 Delaware elections

=== 2008 elections ===
- 2008 presidential election
- 2008 Democratic presidential primary
- 2008 Republican presidential primary
- 2008 U.S. Senate
- 2008 U.S. House
- 2008 gubernatorial

=== 2006 elections ===
- 2006 U.S. House

=== 2004 elections ===
- 2004 presidential election
- 2004 Democratic presidential primary
- 2004 gubernatorial

== See also ==
- Political party strength in Delaware
- Delaware gubernatorial elections
- List of United States Senate elections in Delaware
- United States presidential elections in Delaware
- Women's suffrage in Delaware
