= Delaware's at-large congressional district =

At-large U.S. House district for Delaware

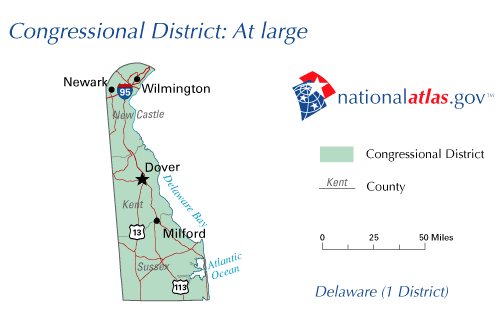
- Representative: Sarah McBride; D–Wilmington
- Area: 2,489 mi^{2} (6,450 km^{2})
- Distribution: 83.3% urban; 16.7% rural
- Population (2025): 1,059,952
- Median household income: $92,520
- Ethnicity: 58.6% White; 21.5% Black; 10.5% Hispanic; 4.3% Asian; 4.3% Two or more races; 0.8% other
- Cook PVI: D+8

Delaware's at-large congressional district is a congressional district that includes the entire U.S. state of Delaware. It is the nation's oldest congressional district, having existed uninterrupted since the 1st United States Congress in 1789. With 1,051,917 residents, the district has the highest population of any congressional district in the nation. Delaware has always had only one member of the United States House of Representatives, except for a single decade from 1813 to 1823, when the state had two at-large members. The two seats were filled by a statewide ballot, with the two candidates receiving the highest votes being elected. The district is represented by Democrat Sarah McBride.

Mike Castle, a Republican and former governor of Delaware, held this seat from January 1993 until his retirement in January 2011, after his unsuccessful bid for the Republican nomination to run for U.S. Senator. Even as Delaware swung heavily Democratic at the state and national level, Castle was usually reelected without serious difficulty. Since his retirement, however, the Democrats have held it with no substantive opposition.

The district is currently represented by Sarah McBride, a Democrat, who was first elected in 2024. McBride is the first openly transgender person elected to Congress.

== Recent statewide results ==
Year	Office	Results
2000	President	Gore 55–42%
2004	President	Kerry 53–46%
2008	President	Obama 62–37%
2012	President	Obama 59–40%
2016	President	Clinton 53–42%
2020	President	Biden 59–40%
2024	President	Harris 56–42%

== List of members representing the district ==
Member	Party	Term	Congress	Electoral history
John Vining (Dover)	Pro- Administration	March 4, 1789 – March 3, 1793	1st 2nd	Elected in 1789. Re-elected in 1790. Retired.
John Patten (Dover)	Anti- Administration	March 4, 1793 – February 14, 1794	3rd	Elected in 1792. Lost election contest.
Henry Latimer (Newport)	Pro- Administration	February 14, 1794 – February 7, 1795	3rd	Won election contest. Lost re-election.
John Patten (Dover)	Democratic- Republican	March 4, 1795 – March 3, 1797	4th	Elected in 1794. Retired.
James A. Bayard (Wilmington)	Federalist	March 4, 1797 – March 3, 1803	5th 6th 7th	Elected in 1796. Re-elected in 1798. Re-elected in 1800. Lost re-election.
Caesar Augustus Rodney (Wilmington)	Democratic- Republican	March 4, 1803 – March 3, 1805	8th	Elected in 1802. Lost re-election.
Vacant		March 4, 1805 – October 1, 1805	9th	James A. Bayard was elected in 1804 but declined to serve, having also been elected U.S. senator.
James M. Broom (Wilmington)	Federalist	October 1, 1805 – October 6, 1807	9th 10th	Elected October 1, 1805 to finish Bayard's term and seated December 2, 1805. Re-elected in 1806, but declined the seat.
Nicholas Van Dyke (New Castle)	Federalist	October 6, 1807 – March 3, 1811	10th 11th	Elected to finish Broom's term. Re-elected in 1808. Retired.
Henry M. Ridgely (Dover)	Federalist	March 4, 1811 – March 3, 1815	12th 13th	Elected in 1810. Re-elected in 1812. Retired.
Thomas Clayton (Dover)	Federalist	March 4, 1815 – March 3, 1817	14th	Elected in 1814. Lost re-election.
Louis McLane (Wilmington)	Federalist (Note: Supported the Crawford faction in the 1824 United States presidential election)	March 4, 1817 – March 3, 1825	15th 16th 17th 18th 19th	Elected in 1816. Re-elected in 1818. Re-elected in 1820. Re-elected in 1822. Re-elected in 1824. Re-elected in 1826 but declined to serve having been elected U.S. senator.
Louis McLane (Wilmington)	Jacksonian	March 4, 1825 – March 3, 1827	15th 16th 17th 18th 19th	Elected in 1816. Re-elected in 1818. Re-elected in 1820. Re-elected in 1822. Re-elected in 1824. Re-elected in 1826 but declined to serve having been elected U.S. senator.
Vacant		March 3, 1827 – October 2, 1827	20th	
Kensey Johns Jr. (New Castle)	Anti- Jacksonian	October 2, 1827 – March 3, 1831	20th 21st	Elected October 2, 1827 to finish McLane's term and seated December 3, 1827. Re-elected in 1828. Retired.
John J. Milligan (Wilmington)	Anti- Jacksonian	March 4, 1831 – March 3, 1837	22nd 23rd 24th 25th	Elected in 1830. Re-elected in 1832. Re-elected in 1834. Re-elected in 1836. Lost re-election.
John J. Milligan (Wilmington)	Whig	March 4, 1837 – March 3, 1839	22nd 23rd 24th 25th	Elected in 1830. Re-elected in 1832. Re-elected in 1834. Re-elected in 1836. Lost re-election.
Thomas Robinson Jr. (Georgetown)	Democratic	March 4, 1839 – March 3, 1841	26th	Elected in 1838. Lost re-election.
George B. Rodney (New Castle)	Whig	March 4, 1841 – March 3, 1845	27th 28th	Elected in 1840. Re-elected in 1842. Retired.
John W. Houston (Georgetown)	Whig	March 4, 1845 – March 3, 1851	29th 30th 31st	Elected in 1844. Re-elected in 1846. Re-elected in 1848. Retired.
George R. Riddle (Wilmington)	Democratic	March 4, 1851 – March 3, 1855	32nd 33rd	Elected in 1850. Re-elected in 1852. Lost re-election.
Elisha D. Cullen (Georgetown)	Know; Nothing	March 4, 1855 – March 3, 1857	34th	Elected in 1854. Lost re-election.
William G. Whiteley (New Castle)	Democratic	March 4, 1857 – March 3, 1861	35th 36th	Elected in 1856. Re-elected in 1858. Retired.
George P. Fisher (Dover)	Union	March 4, 1861 – March 3, 1863	37th	Elected in 1860. Lost re-election.
William Temple (Smyrna)	Democratic	March 4, 1863 – May 28, 1863	38th	Elected in 1862. Died.
Vacant		May 28, 1863 – December 7, 1863	38th	
Nathaniel B. Smithers (Dover)	Union	December 7, 1863 – March 3, 1865	38th	Elected to finish Temple's term. Lost re-election.
John A. Nicholson (Dover)	Democratic	March 4, 1865 – March 3, 1869	39th 40th	Elected in 1864. Re-elected in 1866. Retired.
Benjamin T. Biggs (Summit Bridge)	Democratic	March 4, 1869 – March 3, 1873	41st 42nd	Elected in 1868. Re-elected in 1870. Retired.
James R. Lofland (Milford)	Republican	March 4, 1873 – March 3, 1875	43rd	Elected in 1872. Lost re-election.
James Williams (Kenton)	Democratic	March 4, 1875 – March 3, 1879	44th 45th	Elected in 1874. Re-elected in 1876. Retired.
Edward L. Martin (Seaford)	Democratic	March 4, 1879 – March 3, 1883	46th 47th	Elected in 1878. Re-elected in 1880. Retired.
Charles B. Lore (Wilmington)	Democratic	March 4, 1883 – March 3, 1887	48th 49th	Elected in 1882. Re-elected in 1884. Retired.
John B. Penington (Dover)	Democratic	March 4, 1887 – March 3, 1891	50th 51st	Elected in 1886. Re-elected in 1888. Retired.
John W. Causey (Milford)	Democratic	March 4, 1891 – March 3, 1895	52nd 53rd	Elected in 1890. Re-elected in 1892. Retired.
Jonathan S. Willis (Milford)	Republican	March 4, 1895 – March 3, 1897	54th	Elected in 1894. Lost re-election.
L. Irving Handy (Newark)	Democratic	March 4, 1897 – March 3, 1899	55th	Elected in 1896. Lost re-election.
John H. Hoffecker (Smyrna)	Republican	March 4, 1899 – June 16, 1900	56th	Elected in 1898. Died.
Vacant		June 16, 1900 – November 6, 1900	56th	
Walter O. Hoffecker (Smyrna)	Republican	November 6, 1900 – March 3, 1901	56th	Elected to finish his father's term. Retired.
L. Heisler Ball (Faulkland)	Republican	March 4, 1901 – March 3, 1903	57th	Elected in 1900. Retired to run for U.S. senator.
Henry A. Houston (Millsboro)	Democratic	March 4, 1903 – March 3, 1905	58th	Elected in 1902. Retired.
Hiram R. Burton (Lewes)	Republican	March 4, 1905 – March 3, 1909	59th 60th	Elected in 1904. Re-elected in 1906. Lost renomination.
William H. Heald (Wilmington)	Republican	March 4, 1909 – March 3, 1913	61st 62nd	Elected in 1908. Re-elected in 1910. Retired.
Franklin Brockson (Clayton)	Democratic	March 4, 1913 – March 3, 1915	63rd	Elected in 1912. Lost re-election.
Thomas W. Miller (Wilmington)	Republican	March 4, 1915 – March 3, 1917	64th	Elected in 1914. Lost re-election.
Albert F. Polk (Georgetown)	Democratic	March 4, 1917 – March 3, 1919	65th	Elected in 1916. Lost re-election.
Caleb R. Layton (Georgetown)	Republican	March 4, 1919 – March 3, 1923	66th 67th	Elected in 1918. Re-elected in 1920. Lost re-election.
William H. Boyce (Dover)	Democratic	March 4, 1923 – March 3, 1925	68th	Elected in 1922. Lost re-election.
Robert G. Houston (Georgetown)	Republican	March 4, 1925 – March 3, 1933	69th 70th 71st 72nd	Elected in 1924. Re-elected in 1926. Re-elected in 1928. Re-elected in 1930. Retired.
Wilbur L. Adams (Wilmington)	Democratic	March 4, 1933 – January 3, 1935	73rd	Elected in 1932. Retired to run for U.S. senator.
J. George Stewart (Wilmington)	Republican	January 3, 1935 – January 3, 1937	74th	Elected in 1934. Lost re-election.
William F. Allen (Seaford)	Democratic	January 3, 1937 – January 3, 1939	75th	Elected in 1936. Lost re-election.
George S. Williams (Millsboro)	Republican	January 3, 1939 – January 3, 1941	76th	Elected in 1938. Lost re-election.
Philip A. Traynor (Wilmington)	Democratic	January 3, 1941 – January 3, 1943	77th	Elected in 1940. Lost re-election.
Earle D. Willey (Dover)	Republican	January 3, 1943 – January 3, 1945	78th	Elected in 1942. Lost re-election.
Philip A. Traynor (Wilmington)	Democratic	January 3, 1945 – January 3, 1947	79th	Elected in 1944. Lost re-election.
J. Caleb Boggs (Wilmington)	Republican	January 3, 1947 – January 3, 1953	80th 81st 82nd	Elected in 1946. Re-elected in 1948. Re-elected in 1950. Retired to run for Governor of Delaware.
Herbert Warburton (Wilmington)	Republican	January 3, 1953 – January 3, 1955	83rd	Elected in 1952. Retired to run for U.S. senator.
Harris McDowell (Middletown)	Democratic	January 3, 1955 – January 3, 1957	84th	Elected in 1954. Lost re-election.
Harry G. Haskell Jr. (Wilmington)	Republican	January 3, 1957 – January 3, 1959	85th	Elected in 1956. Lost re-election.
Harris McDowell (Middletown)	Democratic	January 3, 1959 – January 3, 1967	86th 87th 88th 89th	Elected in 1958. Re-elected in 1960. Re-elected in 1962. Re-elected in 1964. Lost re-election.
William Roth (Wilmington)	Republican	January 3, 1967 – December 31, 1970	90th 91st	Elected in 1966. Re-elected in 1968. Retired to run for U.S. senator and resigned after the election.
Vacant		December 31, 1970 – January 3, 1971	91st	
Pete du Pont (Rockland)	Republican	January 3, 1971 – January 3, 1977	92nd 93rd 94th	Elected in 1970. Re-elected in 1972. Re-elected in 1974. Retired to run for Governor of Delaware.
Thomas B. Evans Jr. (Wilmington)	Republican	January 3, 1977 – January 3, 1983	95th 96th 97th	Elected in 1976. Re-elected in 1978. Re-elected in 1980. Lost re-election.
Tom Carper (Wilmington)	Democratic	January 3, 1983 – January 3, 1993	98th 99th 100th 101st 102nd	Elected in 1982. Re-elected in 1984. Re-elected in 1986. Re-elected in 1988. Re-elected in 1990. Retired to run for Governor of Delaware.
Mike Castle (Wilmington)	Republican	January 3, 1993 – January 3, 2011	103rd 104th 105th 106th 107th 108th 109th 110th 111th	Elected in 1992. Re-elected in 1994. Re-elected in 1996. Re-elected in 1998. Re-elected in 2000. Re-elected in 2002. Re-elected in 2004. Re-elected in 2006. Re-elected in 2008. Retired to run for U.S. senator.
John Carney (Wilmington)	Democratic	January 3, 2011 – January 3, 2017	112th 113th 114th	Elected in 2010. Re-elected in 2012. Re-elected in 2014. Retired to run for Governor of Delaware.
Lisa Blunt Rochester (Wilmington)	Democratic	January 3, 2017 – January 3, 2025	115th 116th 117th 118th	Elected in 2016. Re-elected in 2018. Re-elected in 2020. Re-elected in 2022. Retired to run for U.S. Senator.
Sarah McBride (Wilmington)	Democratic	January 3, 2025– present	119th	Elected in 2024. Re-elected in 2026.

=== Second at-large seat: 1813–1823 ===
From 1813 to 1823, Delaware elected two members of the United States House of Representatives. Both were elected statewide at-large. Four men held the second seat during that decade.

Member	Party	Term	Congress	Electoral history
Thomas Cooper (Georgetown)	Federalist	March 4, 1813 – March 3, 1817	13th 14th	Elected in 1812. Re-elected in 1814. Lost re-election.
Willard Hall (Dover)	Democratic- Republican	March 4, 1817 – January 22, 1821	15th 16th	Elected in 1816. Re-elected in 1818. Lost re-election and resigned early.
Vacant		January 22, 1821 – March 3, 1821	16th	
Caesar Augustus Rodney (Wilmington)	Democratic- Republican	March 4, 1821 – January 24, 1822	17th	Elected in 1820. Resigned when elected U.S. senator.
Vacant		January 24, 1822 – October 1, 1822	17th	
Daniel Rodney (Lewes)	Federalist	October 1, 1822 – March 3, 1823	17th	Elected to finish his cousin's term. Retired.

== Electoral history ==
=== 1920 ===
1920 United States House of Representatives election in Delaware
Party	Candidate	Votes	%
Republican	Caleb R. Layton (Incumbent)	52,145	56%
Democratic	James R. Clements	40,206	43%
Socialist	Robert A. Walker	1,063	.01%
Independent	Howard T. Ennis	196	.02%
Total votes		93,609	100%
Turnout			
Republican hold			

=== 1922 ===
1922 United States House of Representatives election in Delaware
Party	Candidate	Votes	%
Democratic	William H. Boyce	39,126	54%
Republican	Caleb R. Layton (Incumbent)	32,577	45%
Independent	Frank A. Houck	908	.01%
Total votes		72,611	100%
Turnout			
Democratic gain from Republican			

=== 1924 ===
1924 United States House of Representatives election in Delaware
Party	Candidate	Votes	%
Republican	Robert G. Houston	51,536	59%
Democratic	William H. Boyce (incumbent)	35,943	41%
Independent	Florence Garvin	519	0.05
Total votes		87,998	100%
Turnout			
Republican gain from Democratic			

=== 1926 ===
1926 United States House of Representatives election in Delaware
Party	Candidate	Votes	%
Republican	Robert G. Houston (incumbent)	38,919	52%
Democratic	Merrill H. Tilghman	35,943	48%
Total votes		74,862	100%
Turnout			
Republican hold			

=== 1928 ===
1928 United States House of Representatives election in Delaware
Party	Candidate	Votes	%
Republican	Robert G. Houston (incumbent)	66,361	64%
Democratic	John M. Richardson	38,045	36%
Total votes		104,406	100%
Turnout			
Republican hold			

=== 1930 ===
1930 United States House of Representatives election in Delaware
Party	Candidate	Votes	%
Republican	Robert G. Houston (incumbent)	48,493	56%
Democratic	John P. Le Fevre	38,391	44%
Independent	Arnold Williams	127	0.01%
Total votes		87,011	100%
Turnout			
Republican hold			

=== 1932 ===
1932 United States House of Representatives election in Delaware
Party	Candidate	Votes	%
Democratic	Wilbur L. Adams	51,698	46%
Republican	Reuben Satterthwaite Jr.	48,841	44%
Prohibition	Francis B. Short	10,560	9%
Socialist	Edgar G. Shaeffer	887	0.08%
Communist	Frank Rhoades	110	0.01%
Total votes		112,096	100%
Turnout			
Democratic gain from Republican			

=== 1934 ===
1934 United States House of Representatives election in Delaware
Party	Candidate	Votes	%
Republican	J. George Stewart	52,829	53%
Democratic	John C. Hazzard	45,771	46%
Socialist	William A. Mayor	404	0.4%
Communist	Joseph P. Daniels	58	.006%
Total votes		99,062	100%
Turnout			
Republican gain from Democratic			

=== 1936 ===
1936 United States House of Representatives election in Delaware
Party	Candidate	Votes	%
Democratic	William F. Allen	65,485	52%
Republican	J. George Stewart (incumbent)	55,664	44%
Republican	James A. Ellison	5,338	4%
Socialist	William A. Mayor	176	0.01%
Total votes		126,663	100%
Turnout			
Democratic gain from Republican			

=== 1938 ===
1938 United States House of Representatives election in Delaware
Party	Candidate	Votes	%
Republican	George S. Williams	60,661	56%
Democratic	William F. Allen (incumbent)	46,989	43%
Republican	William J. Highfield	816	0.07%
Progressive Party (US, 1924)	Ralph L. Brown	105	0.01%
Total votes		108,571	100%
Turnout			
Republican gain from Democratic			

=== 1940 ===
1940 United States House of Representatives election in Delaware
Party	Candidate	Votes	%
Democratic	Philip A. Traynor	68,205	51%
Republican	George S. Williams (incumbent)	64,384	48%
Independent	Royden C. Caulk	816	0.06%
Total votes		133,405	100%
Turnout			
Democratic gain from Republican			

=== 1980 ===
1980 Delaware's at-large congressional district election
Party	Candidate	Votes	%
Republican	Tom Evans (incumbent)	133,842	62%
Democratic	Robert Maxwell	81,227	37%
Libertarian	Lawrence Sullivan	1,506	1%
Total votes		216,575	100%
Republican hold			

=== 1982 ===
1982 Delaware's at-large congressional district election
Party	Candidate	Votes	%
Democratic	Thomas R. Carper	98,533	52%
Republican	Tom Evans (incumbent)	87,153	46%
American	Mary Gies	1,109	1%
Libertarian	Richard Cohen	711	0.38%
N/A	David Nuttall	558	0.30%
Total votes		188,064	100%
Democratic gain from Republican			

=== 1984 ===
1984 Delaware's at-large congressional district election
Party	Candidate	Votes	%
Democratic	Thomas R. Carper (incumbent)	142,070	58%
Republican	Elise du Pont	100,650	41%
Libertarian	V. Luther Etzel	294	0.12%
Total votes		243,014	100%
Democratic hold			

=== 1986 ===
1986 Delaware's at-large congressional district election
Party	Candidate	Votes	%
Democratic	Thomas R. Carper (incumbent)	106,351	66%
Republican	Thomas Nueberger	53,767	33%
American	Patrick Harrison	639	0.40%
Total votes		160,757	100%
Democratic hold			

=== 1988 ===
1988 Delaware's at-large congressional district election
Party	Candidate	Votes	%
Democratic	Thomas R. Carper (incumbent)	158,338	68%
Republican	James P. Krapf	76,179	32%
Total votes		234,517	100%
Democratic hold			

=== 1990 ===
1990 Delaware's at-large congressional district election
Party	Candidate	Votes	%
Democratic	Thomas R. Carper (incumbent)	116,274	66%
Republican	Ralph Williams	58,037	33%
Libertarian	Richard Cohen	3,121	1%
N/A	Write-ins	3	<0.01%
Total votes		177,435	100%
Democratic hold			

=== 1992 ===
1992 Delaware's at-large congressional district election
Party	Candidate	Votes	%
Republican	Mike Castle	153,037	55%
Democratic	S. B. Woo	117,426	43%
Libertarian	Peggy Schmitt	5,661	2%
Total votes		276,124	100%
Republican gain from Democratic			

=== 1994 ===
1994 Delaware's at-large congressional district election
Party	Candidate	Votes	%
Republican	Mike Castle (incumbent)	137,945	71%
Democratic	Carol Ann DeSantis	51,793	27%
Libertarian	Danny Ray Beaver	3,866	2%
Independent Party	Donald M. Hockmuth	1,404	0.72%
Total votes		195,008	100%
Republican hold			

=== 1996 ===
1996 Delaware's at-large congressional district election
Party	Candidate	Votes	%
Republican	Mike Castle (incumbent)	185,577	70%
Democratic	Dennis E. Williams	73,258	27%
Libertarian	George A. Jurgensen	4,000	2%
Constitution	Felicia B. Johnson	3,009	1%
Natural Law	Bob Mattson	987	0.37%
Total votes		266,831	100%
Republican hold			

=== 1998 ===
1998 Delaware's at-large congressional district election
Party	Candidate	Votes	%
Republican	Mike Castle (incumbent)	119,811	66%
Democratic	Dennis E. Williams	57,446	32%
Constitution	James P. Webster	2,411	1%
Natural Law	Kim Stanley Bemis	859	1%
N/A	Write-ins	2	<0.01%
Total votes		180,529	100%
Republican hold			

=== 2000 ===
2000 Delaware's at-large congressional district election
Party	Candidate	Votes	%
Republican	Mike Castle (incumbent)	211,797	68%
Democratic	Micheal C. Miller	96,488	31%
Constitution	James P. Webster	2,490	0.5%
Libertarian	Brad C. Thomas	2,351	0.5%
Total votes		313,126	100%
Republican hold			

=== 2002 ===
2002 Delaware's at-large congressional district election
Party	Candidate	Votes	%
Republican	Mike Castle (incumbent)	164,605	72%
Democratic	Micheal C. Miller	61,011	27%
Libertarian	Brad C. Thomas	2,789	1%
Total votes		228,405	100%
Republican hold			

=== 2004 ===
2004 Delaware's at-large congressional district election
Party	Candidate	Votes	%
Republican	Mike Castle (incumbent)	245,978	69%
Democratic	Paul Donnelly	105,716	30%
Independent Party	Maurice J. Barros (write-in)	2,337	0.5%
Libertarian	William E. Morris	2,014	0.5%
Total votes		356,045	100%
Republican hold			

=== 2006 ===
2006 Delaware's at-large congressional district election
Party	Candidate	Votes	%
Republican	Mike Castle (incumbent)	143,897	57%
Democratic	Dennis Spivack	97,565	39%
Independent Party	Karen M. Hartley-Nagle	5,769	2%
Green	Michael Berg	4,463	2%
Total votes		251,694	100%
Republican hold			

=== 2008 ===
2008 Delaware's at-large congressional district election
Party	Candidate	Votes	%
Republican	Mike Castle (incumbent)	235,437	61%
Democratic	Karen Hartley-Nagle	146,434	38%
Libertarian	Mark Parks	3,586	1%
Total votes		385,457	100%
Republican hold			

=== 2010 ===
2010 Delaware's at-large congressional district election
Party	Candidate	Votes	%
Democratic	John Carney	173,543	57%
Republican	Glen Urquhart	125,442	41%
Independent Party	Earl R. Lofland	3,704	1%
Libertarian	Brent Wangen	1,986	1%
Independent	Jeffrey Brown	961	0.31%
Total votes		305,636	100%
Turnout			
Democratic gain from Republican			

=== 2012 ===
2012 Delaware's at-large congressional district election
Party	Candidate	Votes	%
Democratic	John Carney (incumbent)	249,905	64%
Republican	Tom Kovach	129,749	33%
Green	Bernard August	4,273	2%
Libertarian	Scott Gesty	4,096	1%
Total votes		388,023	100%
Democratic hold			

=== 2014 ===
2014 Delaware's at-large congressional district election
Party	Candidate	Votes	%
Democratic	John Carney (incumbent)	137,251	59%
Republican	Rose Izzo	85,146	37%
Green	Bernard August	4,801	2%
Libertarian	Scott Gesty	4,419	2%
Total votes		231,617	100%
Democratic hold			

=== 2016 ===
2016 Delaware's at-large congressional district election
Party	Candidate	Votes	%
Democratic	Lisa Blunt Rochester	233,554	56%
Republican	Hans Reigle	172,301	41%
Green	Mark Andrew Perri	8,326	2%
Libertarian	Scott Gesty	6,436	2%
Total votes		420,617	100%
Democratic hold			

=== 2018 ===
2018 Delaware's at-large congressional district election
Party	Candidate	Votes	%
Democratic	Lisa Blunt Rochester (incumbent)	227,353	64.5%
Republican	Scott Walker	125,384	35.5%
Total votes		352,737	100%
Democratic hold			

=== 2020 ===
2020 Delaware's at-large congressional district election
Party	Candidate	Votes	%
Democratic	Lisa Blunt Rochester (incumbent)	281,382	57.63%
Republican	Lee Murphy	196,392	40.22%
Independent Party	Catherine S. Purcell	6,682	1.37%
Libertarian	David L. Rogers	3,814	0.78%
Total votes		488,270	100%
Democratic hold			

=== 2022 ===
2022 Delaware's at-large congressional district election
Party	Candidate	Votes	%
Democratic	Lisa Blunt Rochester	178,416	55.4%
Republican	Lee Murphy	138,201	42.9%
Libertarian	Cody McNutt	3,074	0.9%
Non-Partisan Delaware	David Rogers	1,958	0.6%
Total votes		321,568	100%
Democratic hold			

=== 2024 ===
2024 Delaware's at-large congressional district election
Party	Candidate	Votes	%
Democratic	Sarah McBride (incumbent)	287,830	57.9%
Republican	John Whalen	209,606	42.1%
Total votes		497,436	100%
