= 2026 United States House of Representatives election in Delaware =

2026 United States House of Representatives election in Delaware's at-large district
- November 3, 2026
- Turnout: 47.49%
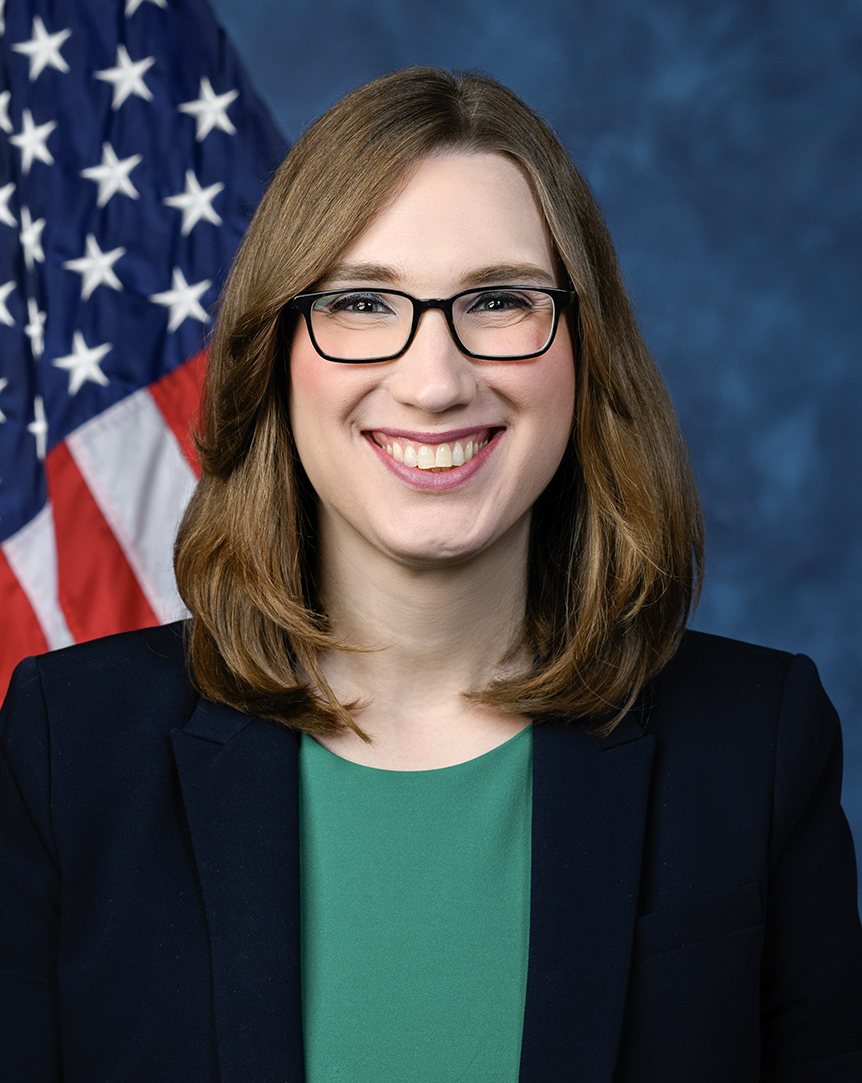

| Nominee | Sarah McBride | Joseph Arminio |
| Party | Democratic | Republican |
| Popular vote | 243,687 | 135,016 |
| Percentage | 64.35% | 35.65% |
- McBride: 50–60% 60–70% 70–80% 80–90% >90% Arminio: 50–60% 60–70% 70–80% 80–90% No votes
U.S. Representative before election
Sarah McBride
Democratic
Elected U.S. Representative
Sarah McBride
Democratic

The 2026 United States House of Representatives election in Delaware was held on November 3, 2026, to elect a member of the United States House of Representatives to represent the state of Delaware from its at-large congressional district. The election coincided with other elections to the U.S. House, elections to the United States Senate, and various other state and local elections. Primary elections took place on September 15, 2026.

Incumbent Democratic representative Sarah McBride was elected in 2024 with 57.9% of the vote. She won reelection with over 64% of the vote, marking the best performance for any candidate in the at-large House seat since 2012. She also flipped reliably Republican Sussex County, which had not voted Democratic in the House seat since 2012.

== Democratic primary ==
=== Candidates ===
==== Nominee ====
- Sarah McBride, incumbent U.S. Representative

=== Endorsements ===
Sarah McBride

U.S. senators

- Chris Coons, Delaware (2010–present)

Statewide officials

- Matt Meyer, governor of Delaware (2025–present)

Political parties

- Delaware Democratic Party

Labor unions

- American Federation of Government Employees

Organizations

- Advocates for Trans Equality
- Brady PAC
- Christopher Street Project
- Equality PAC
- Everytown for Gun Safety
- Giffords
- Human Rights Campaign
- Jewish Democratic Council of America
- Joint Action Committee for Political Affairs
- J Street
- LGBTQ+ Victory Fund
- League of Conservation Voters
- LPAC
- National Organization for Women PAC
- National Women's Political Caucus
- Planned Parenthood Action Fund
- Population Connection
- Reproductive Freedom for All

=== Fundraising ===
Campaign finance reports as of August 26, 2026
| Candidate | Raised | Spent | Cash on hand |
|---|---|---|---|
| Sarah McBride (D) | $5,060,925 | $2,567,850 | $2,700,202 |
Source: Federal Election Commission

== Republican primary ==
=== Candidates ===
==== Nominee ====
- Joseph Arminio, medical doctor and candidate for Maryland's 1st congressional district in 2008

==== Eliminated in primary ====
- Earl Cooper, Democratic candidate for this seat in 2024
- John J. Whalen, retired business owner and nominee for this seat in 2024

==== Withdrawn ====
- Lee Murphy, nominee for this seat in 2020 and 2022

==== Did not file ====
- Donyale Hall, general contractor, nominee for lieutenant governor in 2020 and candidate for this seat in 2024

=== Endorsements ===
Earl Cooper

Political parties

- Delaware Republican Party

=== Fundraising ===
Campaign finance reports as of August 26, 2026
| Candidate | Raised | Spent | Cash on hand |
|---|---|---|---|
| Joseph Arminio (R) | $6,634 | $4,453 | $2,181 |
| Donyale Hall (R) | $779 | $539 | $240 |
| John Whalen (R) | $1,589 | $3,779 | $5,555 |
Source: Federal Election Commission

=== Results ===
Primary results by county: Arminio: 40–50%; 50–60%

Republican primary results
| Party | Candidate | Votes | % |
|---|---|---|---|
| Republican | Joseph Arminio | 18,629 | 47.9 |
| Republican | John J. Whalen | 12,523 | 32.2 |
| Republican | Earl Cooper | 7,772 | 19.9 |
| Total votes | | 38,924 | 100.0 |

== General election ==
=== Predictions ===
| Source | Ranking | As of |
|---|---|---|
| Decision Desk HQ | Safe D | July 14, 2026 |
| The Cook Political Report | Solid D | April 30, 2025 |
| Inside Elections | Solid D | April 17, 2025 |
| Sabato's Crystal Ball | Safe D | April 10, 2025 |
| The Economist | Safe D | May 6, 2026 |

=== Post-primary endorsements ===
Sarah McBride (D)

Labor unions

- National Education Association
