= 1807 Delaware's at-large congressional district special election =

A special election was held in Delaware's at-large congressional district on October 6, 1807, to fill a vacancy left by the resignation of James M. Broom (Federalist).

== Background ==
In 1806, James M. Broom was re-elected to a second term in Delaware's at-large district. He'd won his first term in a special election caused by James A. Bayard's election to the Senate. However, Broom did not serve this second term, instead resigning as well, before the start of the Tenth Congress. A special election was held for his replacement.

== Election results ==
Candidate	Party	Votes	Percent
Nicholas Van Dyke	Federalist	3,294	51.7%
John Dickinson	Democratic-Republican	3,078	48.3%
Others		3	0.05%

== See also ==
- List of special elections to the United States House of Representatives
