= 1804 United States House of Representatives election in Delaware =

- October 13–20, 1804
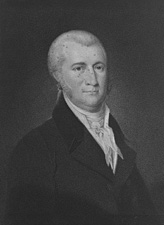

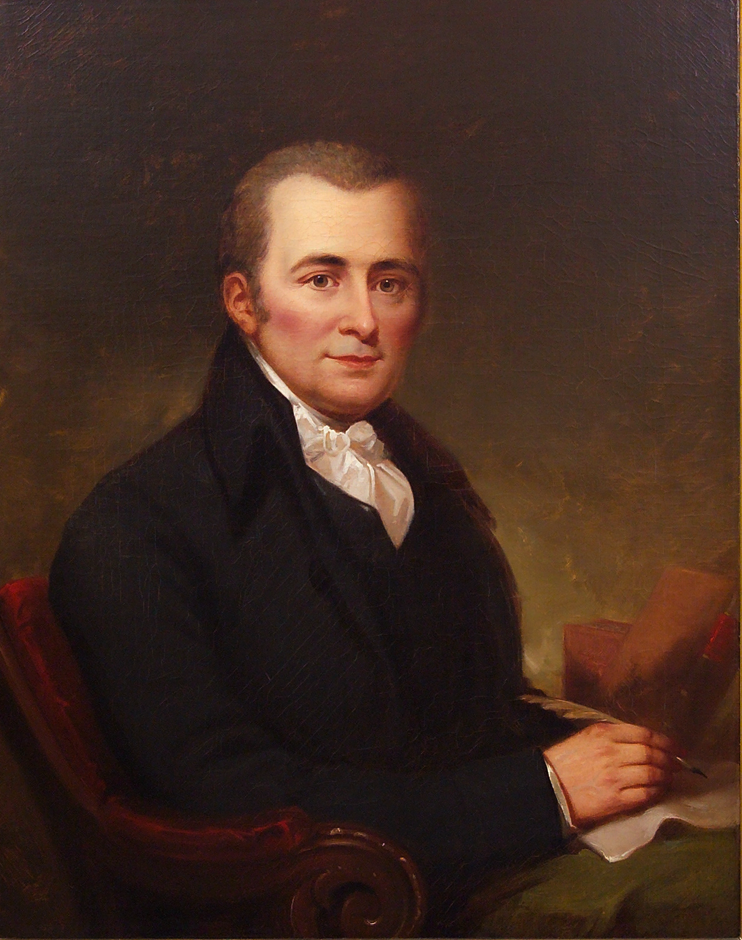
Nominee	James A. Bayard Sr.	Caesar Augustus Rodney
Party	Federalist	Democratic-Republican
Popular vote	4,398	4,040
Percentage	52.12%	47.88%
U.S. Representative before election
Caesar Augustus Rodney
Democratic-Republican
Elected U.S. Representative
James A. Bayard Sr.
Federalist

The 1804 United States House of Representatives election in Delaware was held October 13–20, 1804. The incumbent Representative Caesar Augustus Rodney was defeated by the former Representative James A. Bayard Sr., whom he had defeated in the previous election, with 52.12% of the vote.

== Results ==
1804 United States House of Representatives election in Delaware
Party	Candidate	Votes	%
Federalist	James A. Bayard Sr.	4,398	52.12%
Democratic-Republican	Caesar Augustus Rodney (incumbent)	4,040	47.88%
Total votes		8,438	100%

=== Results by county ===
County	Bayard#	Bayard%	Rodney#	Rodney%	Total votes cast
Kent	1,374	57.47%	1,017	42.53%	2,391
New Castle	902	31.40%	1,971	68.60%	2,873
Sussex	2,122	66.86%	1,052	33.14%	3,174
Totals	4,398	50.11%	4,040	47.88%	8,438

== See also ==
- 1805 Delaware's at-large congressional district special election
- 1804–05 United States House of Representatives elections
- List of United States representatives from Delaware
