= 1800 United States House of Representatives election in Delaware =

- October 7, 1800
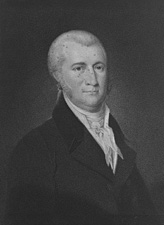

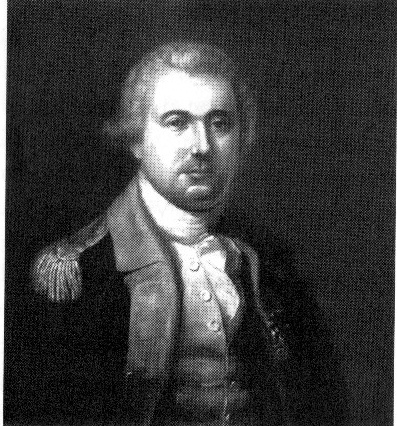
Nominee	James A. Bayard Sr.	John Patten
Party	Federalist	Democratic-Republican
Popular vote	2,674	2,340
Percentage	53.33%	46.67%
U.S. Representative before election
James A. Bayard Sr.
Federalist
Elected U.S. Representative
James A. Bayard Sr.
Federalist

The 1800 United States House of Representatives election in Delaware was held on October 7, 1800. The incumbent Representative and House Minority Leader James A. Bayard Sr. won reelection and defeated the former Representative John Patten, who would die later that year.

== Results ==
United States House of Representatives elections in Delaware, 1800
Party	Candidate	Votes	%
Federalist	James A. Bayard Sr. (incumbent)	2,674	53.33%
Democratic-Republican	John Patten	2,340	46.67%
Total votes		5,014	100%
