= 1794 United States House of Representatives election in Delaware =

- October 4, 1794
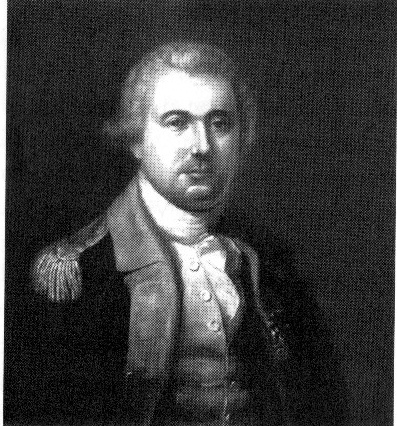

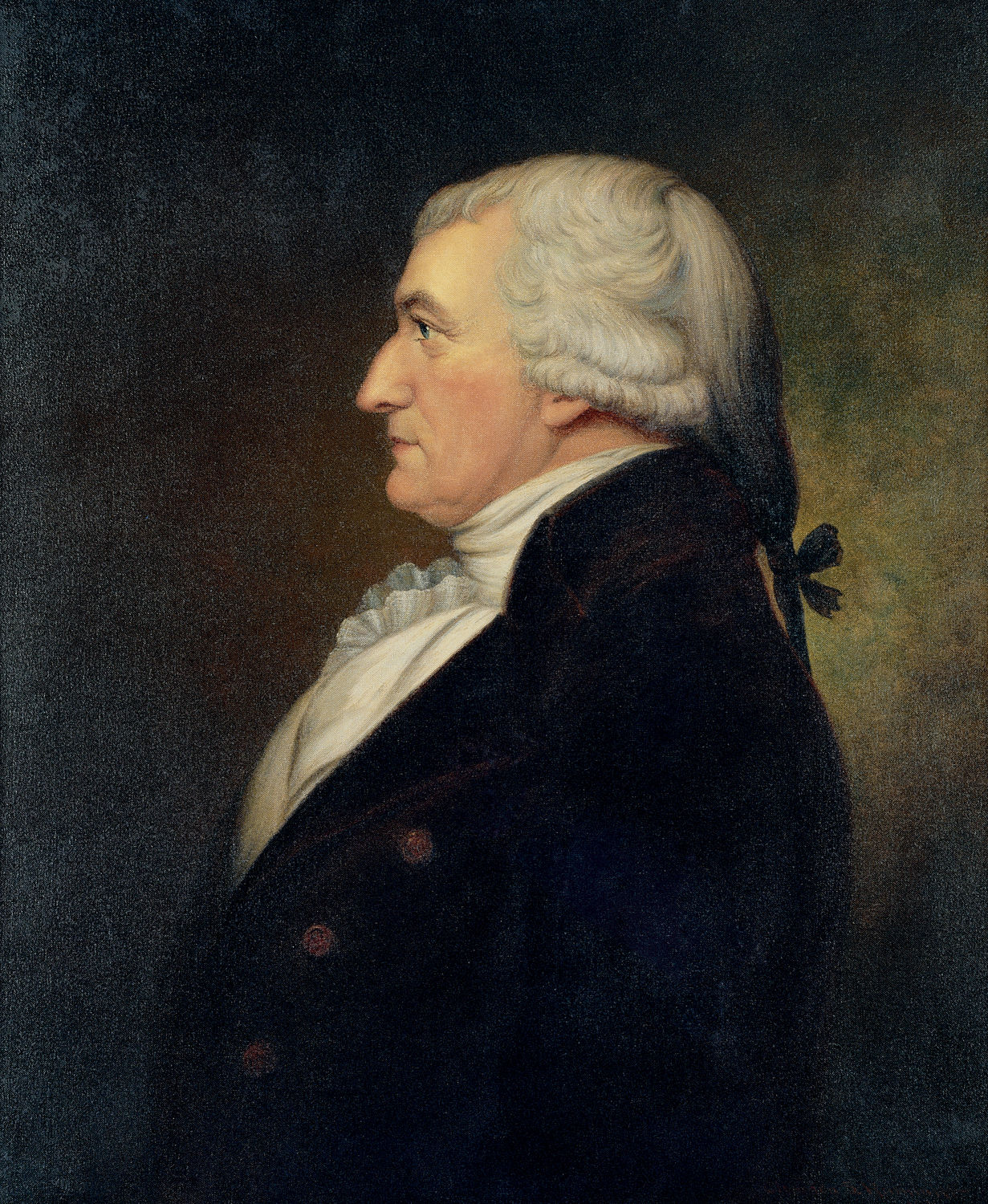
Nominee	John Patten	Henry Latimer
Party	Democratic-Republican	Federalist
Popular vote	2,409	2,285
Percentage	51.32%	48.68%
U.S. Representative before election
Henry Latimer
Federalist
Elected U.S. Representative
John Patten
Democratic-Republican

The 1794 United States House of Representatives election in Delaware was held on October 4, 1794. The incumbent Representative Henry Latimer was defeated after a rematch with John Patten.

== Results ==
1794 United States House of Representatives election in Delaware
Party	Candidate	Votes	%
Democratic-Republican	John Patten	2,409	51.32%
Federalist	Henry Latimer (incumbent)	2,285	48.68%
Total votes		4,694	100%
