= 1796 United States House of Representatives election in Delaware =

- October 4, 1796
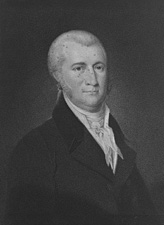
Nominee	James A. Bayard Sr.	William Perry
Party	Federalist	Democratic-Republican
Popular vote	2,292	1,779
Percentage	56.30%	43.70%
Member of the U.S. House of Representatives before election
John Patten
Democratic-Republican
Elected Member of the U.S. House of Representatives
James A. Bayard Sr.
Federalist

The 1796 United States House of Representatives election in Delaware was held October 4, 1796. James A. Bayard Sr. won the election.

== Results ==
1796 United States House of Representatives election in Delaware
Party	Candidate	Votes	%
Federalist	James A. Bayard Sr.	2,292	56.30%
Democratic-Republican	William Perry	1,779	43.70%
Total votes		4,071	100%
