= 2024 United States House of Representatives election in Delaware =

2024 United States House of Representatives election in Delaware's at-large district
- November 5, 2024
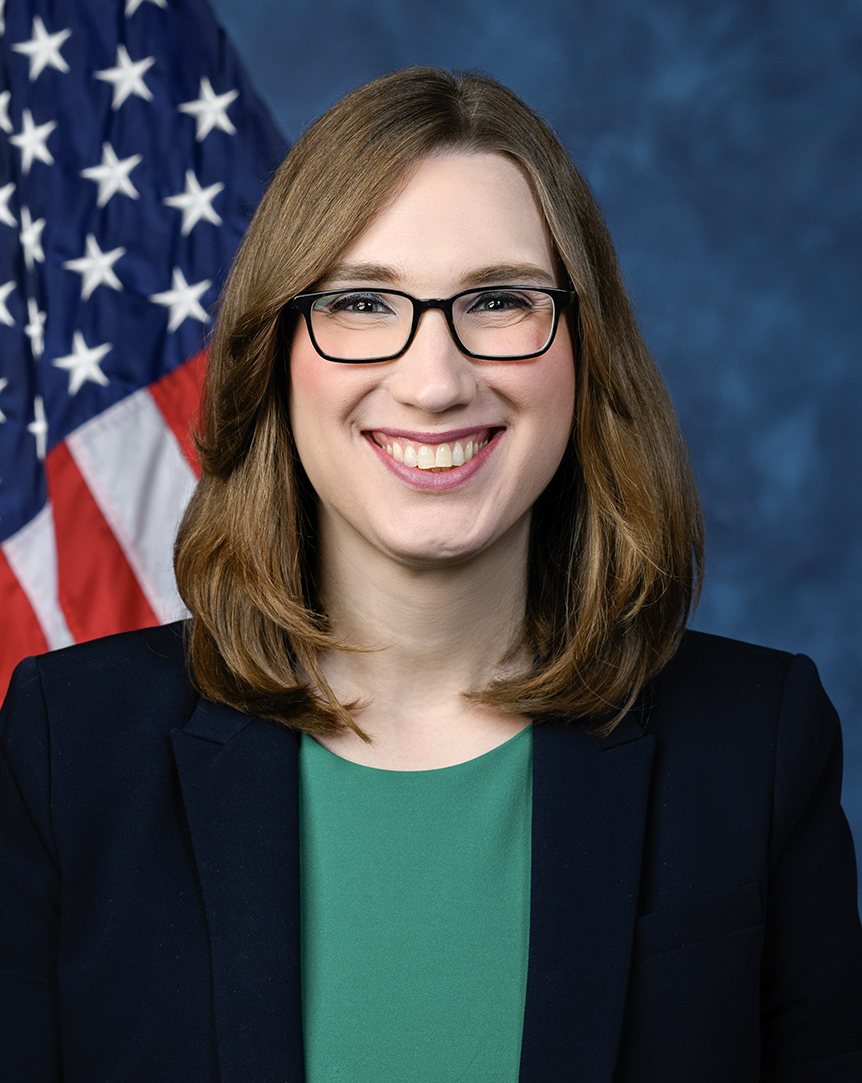

Nominee	Sarah McBride	John Whalen
Party	Democratic	Republican
Popular vote	287,830	209,606
Percentage	57.86%	42.14%
- McBride: 50–60% 60–70% 70–80% 80–90% >90% Whalen: 50–60% 60–70% 70–80% 80–90% No data
U.S. Representative before election
Lisa Blunt Rochester
Democratic
Elected U.S. Representative
Sarah McBride
Democratic

The 2024 United States House of Representatives election in Delaware was held on November 5, 2024, to elect a member of the United States House of Representatives to represent the state of Delaware from its at-large congressional district. The election coincided with the 2024 U.S. presidential election, other elections to the U.S. House, elections to the United States Senate, and various other state and local elections.

Incumbent Democratic representative Lisa Blunt Rochester was first elected in 2016 and re-elected in 2022 with 55.5% of the vote. Blunt Rochester declined to seek re-election, instead running for the U.S. Senate. The primary election took place on September 10, 2024. Sarah McBride won the primary election on September 10, 2024, and the general election on November 5, and is the first openly transgender member of Congress.

== Democratic primary ==
=== Candidates ===
==== Nominee ====
- Sarah McBride, state senator

==== Eliminated in primary ====
- Earl Cooper, traffic control business owner
- Elias Weir, accounts payable supervisor and perennial candidate

==== Withdrew ====
- Colleen Davis, Delaware state treasurer (endorsed McBride)
- Eugene Young, director of the Delaware State Housing Authority and candidate for mayor of Wilmington in 2016

==== Declined ====
- Lisa Blunt Rochester, incumbent U.S. representative (ran for U.S. Senate, endorsed McBride)
- Elizabeth Lockman, state senator (endorsed McBride)
- Bryan Townsend, majority leader of the Delaware Senate and candidate for this seat in 2016 (endorsed McBride)

=== Endorsements ===
Sarah McBride

U.S. senators

- Tom Carper, U.S. senator from Delaware (2001–2025)

U.S. representatives

- Pete Aguilar, CA-33 (2015–present), chair of the House Democratic Caucus (2023–present)
- Lisa Blunt Rochester, DE-AL (2017–2025)
- Katherine Clark, MA-05 (2013–present), House minority whip (2023–present)
- Lois Frankel, FL-22 (2013–present)
- Pramila Jayapal, WA-07 (2017–present)
- Hakeem Jeffries, NY-08 (2013–present), House minority leader (2023–present)
- Annie Kuster, NH-02 (2013–present)
- Nancy Pelosi, CA-11 (1987–present) and former Speaker of the House (2007–2011, 2019–2023)
- Mark Pocan, WI-02 (2013–present)
- Jamie Raskin, MD-08 (2017–present)
- Mark Takano, CA-39 (2013–present)
- Ritchie Torres, NY-15 (2021–present)

Statewide officials

- John Carney, governor of Delaware (previously endorsed Eugene Young)
- Colleen Davis, Delaware state treasurer
- Matthew Denn, former attorney general of Delaware (2015–2019)
- Kathy Jennings, attorney general of Delaware (2019–present)
- Trinidad Navarro, Delaware Insurance Commissioner (2017–present)
- Lydia York, Delaware Auditor of Accounts (2023–present)

State legislators

- 13 state senators
- 17 state representatives

Local officials

- Annise Parker, former mayor of Houston, Texas (2010–2016) and president of LGBTQ Victory Fund

Individuals

- Sara Nelson, Association of Flight Attendants international president (2014–present)
- Kelley Robinson, president of Human Rights Campaign

Organizations

- AIPAC
- Congressional Progressive Caucus PAC
- Delaware State Education Association
- Democratic Majority for Israel
- EMILY's List
- End Citizens United
- Equality PAC
- Human Rights Campaign
- League of Conservation Voters
- LGBTQ Victory Fund
- LPAC
- National Center for Transgender Equality Action Fund
- National Education Association
- National Organization for Women PAC
- National Women's Political Caucus
- NewDem Action Fund
- Our Revolution
- Planned Parenthood Action Fund
- Population Connection Action Fund
- Reproductive Freedom for All
- Stonewall Democratic Club
- Stonewall Democrats of Delaware

Labor unions

- AFSCME Council 81
- Amalgamated Transit Union
- Association of Flight Attendants-CWA
- CWA Local 13101
- IBB Local 13
- IBEW Local 313
- International Union of Bricklayers and Allied Craftworkers Local 1
- International Union of Elevator Constructors Locals 5 and 7
- International Union of Operating Engineers Local 541
- Iron Workers Local 451
- IUPAT District Council 21
- Laborers' Union Local 199
- Teamsters Local 326
- United Food and Commercial Workers Local 27
Colleen Davis (withdrawn)

Organizations

- Vote Mama

Local officials

- 10 mayors
Eugene Young (withdrawn)

US senators

- Cory Booker, U.S. senator from New Jersey

Statewide officials

- John Carney, governor of Delaware

=== Fundraising ===
Italics indicate a withdrawn candidate.

Campaign finance reports as of March 31, 2024
Candidate	Raised	Spent	Cash on hand
Sarah McBride (D)	$1,867,314	$612,290	$1,255,024
Colleen Davis (D)	$162,553	$150,465	$12,088
Eugene Young (D)	$401,188	$158,019	$243,169
Source: Federal Election Commission

=== Polling ===
Poll source	Date(s) administered	Sample size (Note: Key: A – all adults RV – registered voters LV – likely voters V – unclear)	Margin of error	Colleen Davis	Sarah McBride	Eugene Young	Other	Undecided
Slingshot Strategies (Note: The poll was commissioned by Citizens for Judicial Fairness.)	October 7–14, 2023	600 (RV)	± 3.9%	6%	22%	4%	—	68%
Change Research (Note: The poll was commissioned by the Human Rights Campaign PAC, which supports McBride.)	September 7–12, 2023	531 (LV)	—	12%	44%	23%	2% (Note: "Would not vote" with 2%)	18%

=== Results ===
Results by county: McBride—80–90% McBride—70–80%

Democratic primary results
Party	Candidate	Votes	%
Democratic	Sarah McBride	66,764	79.9
Democratic	Earl Cooper	13,557	16.2
Democratic	Elias Weir	3,286	3.9
Total votes		83,607	100.0

== Republican primary ==
=== Candidates ===
==== Nominee ====
- John Whalen, retired building contractor

==== Eliminated in primary ====
- Donyale Hall, general contractor and nominee for lieutenant governor in 2020

==== Withdrew ====
- Joseph Arminio, physician

=== Results ===
Republican primary results
Party	Candidate	Votes	%
Republican	John Whalen	19,880	55.8
Republican	Donyale Hall	15,752	44.2
Total votes		35,632	100.0

== General election ==
=== Predictions ===
Source	Ranking	As of
The Cook Political Report	Solid D	July 28, 2023
Inside Elections	Solid D	July 28, 2023
Sabato's Crystal Ball	Safe D	June 8, 2023
Elections Daily	Safe D	June 8, 2023
CNalysis	Solid D	November 16, 2023

=== Polling ===
Poll source	Date(s) administered	Sample size	Margin of error	Sarah McBride (D)	John Whalen (R)	Undecided
University of Delaware	September 11–19, 2024	400 (RV)	± 5.8%	52%	31%	17%

=== Results ===
2024 Delaware's at-large congressional district
Party	Candidate	Votes	%	±%
Democratic	Sarah McBride	287,830	57.86%	+2.39%
Republican	John Whalen	209,606	42.14%	−0.83%
Total votes		497,436	100.00%	N/A
Democratic hold				

==== By county ====
County	Sarah McBride Democratic		John Whalen Republican		Margin		Total votes
County	#	%	#	%	#	%	Total votes
Kent	44,499	51.88	41,267	48.12	3,232	3.76	85,766
New Castle	177,730	66.45	89,728	33.55	88,002	32.90	267,458
Sussex	65,601	45.49	78,611	54.51	-13,010	-9.02	144,212
Totals	287,830	57.86	209,606	42.14	78,224	15.72	497,436

Counties that flipped from Republican to Democratic

- Kent (largest city: Dover)

== Notes ==
Partisan clients
