= 2022 United States House of Representatives election in Delaware =

2022 United States House of Representatives election in Delaware's at-large district
- November 8, 2022
- Turnout: 42.2%
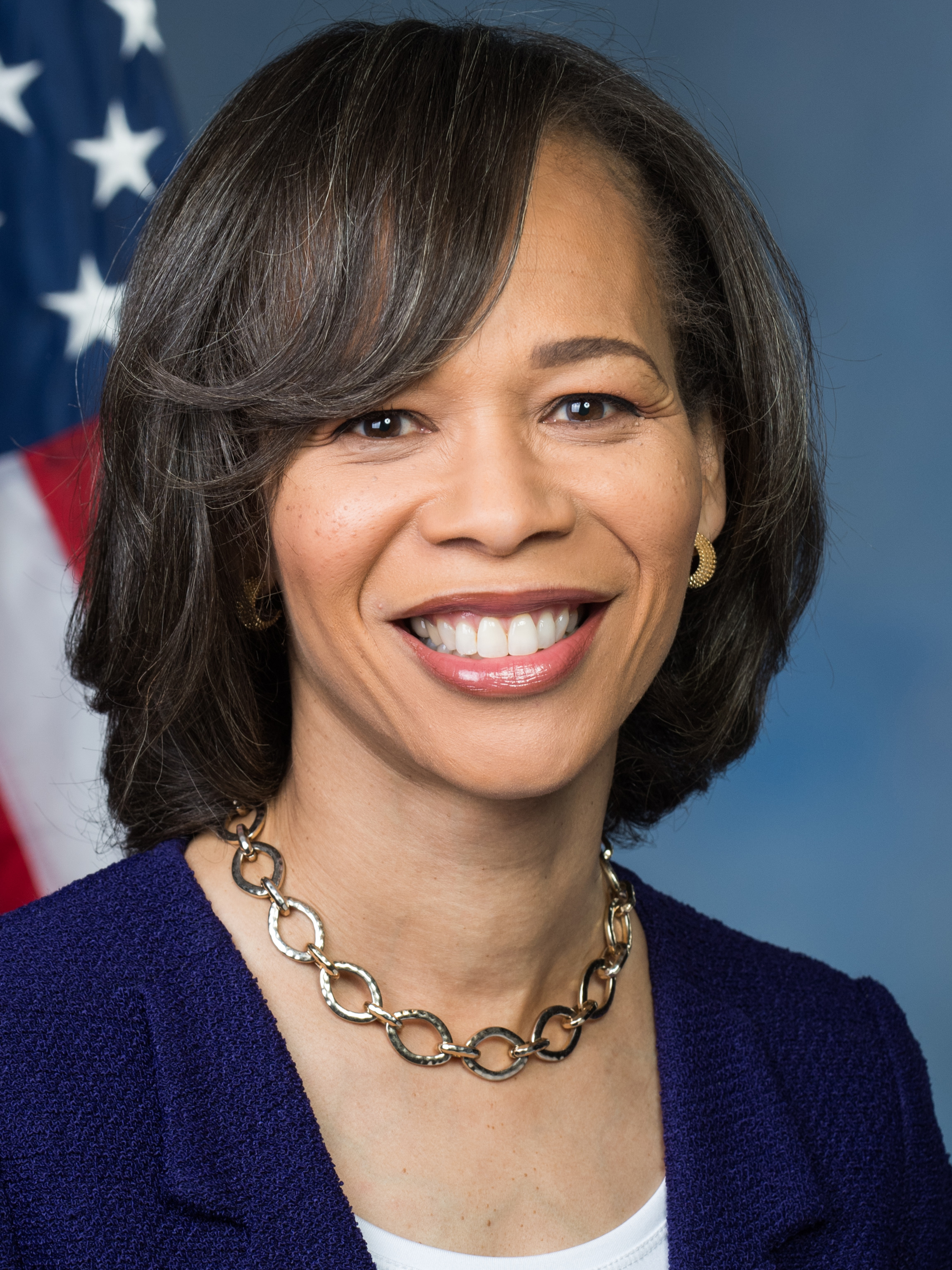

Candidate	Lisa Blunt Rochester	Lee Murphy
Party	Democratic	Republican
Popular vote	178,416	138,201
Percentage	55.47%	42.97%
- Blunt Rochester: 50–60% 60–70% 70–80% 80–90% >90% Murphy: 40–50% 50–60% 60–70% 70–80% 80–90% Tie: 40–50% No data
U.S. Representative before election
Lisa Blunt Rochester
Democratic
Elected U.S. Representative
Lisa Blunt Rochester
Democratic

The 2022 United States House of Representatives election in Delaware was held on November 8, 2022, to elect the U.S. representative from Delaware's at-large congressional district. The election coincided with other elections to the House of Representatives, elections to the United States Senate and various state and local elections. The incumbent Democrat Lisa Blunt Rochester won re-election to a fourth term.

The election had very low turnout and was the worst performance for the Democratic candidate since 2008 when incumbent Republican representative Mike Castle won reelection in a landslide. This was also the closest House race in the state since 1982.

== Democratic primary ==
=== Candidates ===
==== Nominee ====
- Lisa Blunt Rochester, incumbent U.S. representative

== Republican primary ==
=== Candidates ===
==== Nominee ====
- Lee Murphy, perennial candidate, candidate for this district in 2018 and nominee in 2020

== Independent and third party candidates ==
=== Declared ===
- Cody McNutt (Libertarian)
- David Rogers (Non-Partisan Delaware) (Note: Non-Partisan Delaware is a political party, not the name for an unaffiliated candidate.)

=== Write-in ===
- Edward Shlikas

== General election ==
=== Debate ===
2022 Delaware U.S. House of Representatives debate
No.	Date	Host	Moderator	Link	Democratic	Republican	Libertarian	Non-Partisan Delaware
Key: P Participant A Absent N Not invited I Invited W Withdrawn								
Key: P Participant A Absent N Not invited I Invited W Withdrawn					Lisa Blunt Rochester	Lee Murphy	Cody McNutt	David Rogers
1	Oct. 25, 2022	University of Delaware	Ralph Begleiter		P	P	N	N

=== Predictions ===
Source	Ranking	As of
The Cook Political Report	Solid D	October 5, 2021
Inside Elections	Solid D	October 11, 2021
Sabato's Crystal Ball	Safe D	October 5, 2021
Politico	Solid D	April 5, 2022
RCP	Safe D	June 9, 2022
Fox News	Solid D	July 11, 2022
DDHQ	Solid D	July 20, 2022
538	Solid D	June 30, 2022

=== Endorsements ===
Lisa Blunt Rochester (D)

Organizations

- Feminist Majority PAC
- Planned Parenthood Action Fund
- Sierra Club
- Stonewall Democrats of Delaware

=== Polling ===
Poll source	Date(s) administered	Sample size (Note: Key: A – all adults RV – registered voters LV – likely voters V – unclear)	Margin of error	Lisa Blunt Rochester (D)	Lee Murphy (R)	Undecided
University of Delaware	September 14–29, 2022	905 (RV)	± 3.3%	50%	33%	17%

=== Results ===
2022 Delaware's at-large congressional district
Party	Candidate	Votes	%	±%
Democratic	Lisa Blunt Rochester (incumbent)	178,416	55.47%	−2.16%
Republican	Lee Murphy	138,201	42.97%	+2.75%
Libertarian	Cody McNutt	3,074	0.96%	+0.18%
Non-Partisan Delaware	David Rogers	1,958	0.61%	N/A
Total votes		321,649	100%	
Democratic hold				

County	Lisa Blunt Rochester Democratic		Lee Murphy Republican		All Others	
County	#	%	#	%	#	%
New Castle	110,139	64.96%	56,529	33.34%	2,875	1.7%
Kent	25,974	48.03%	27,146	50.2%	956	1.77%
Sussex	42,303	43.15%	54,526	55.62%	1,201	1.23%
Totals	178,416	55.47%	138,201	42.97%	5,032	1.57%

Counties that flipped from Democratic to Republican

- Kent (largest city: Dover)
