= 1974 United States House of Representatives election in Delaware =

- November 5, 1974
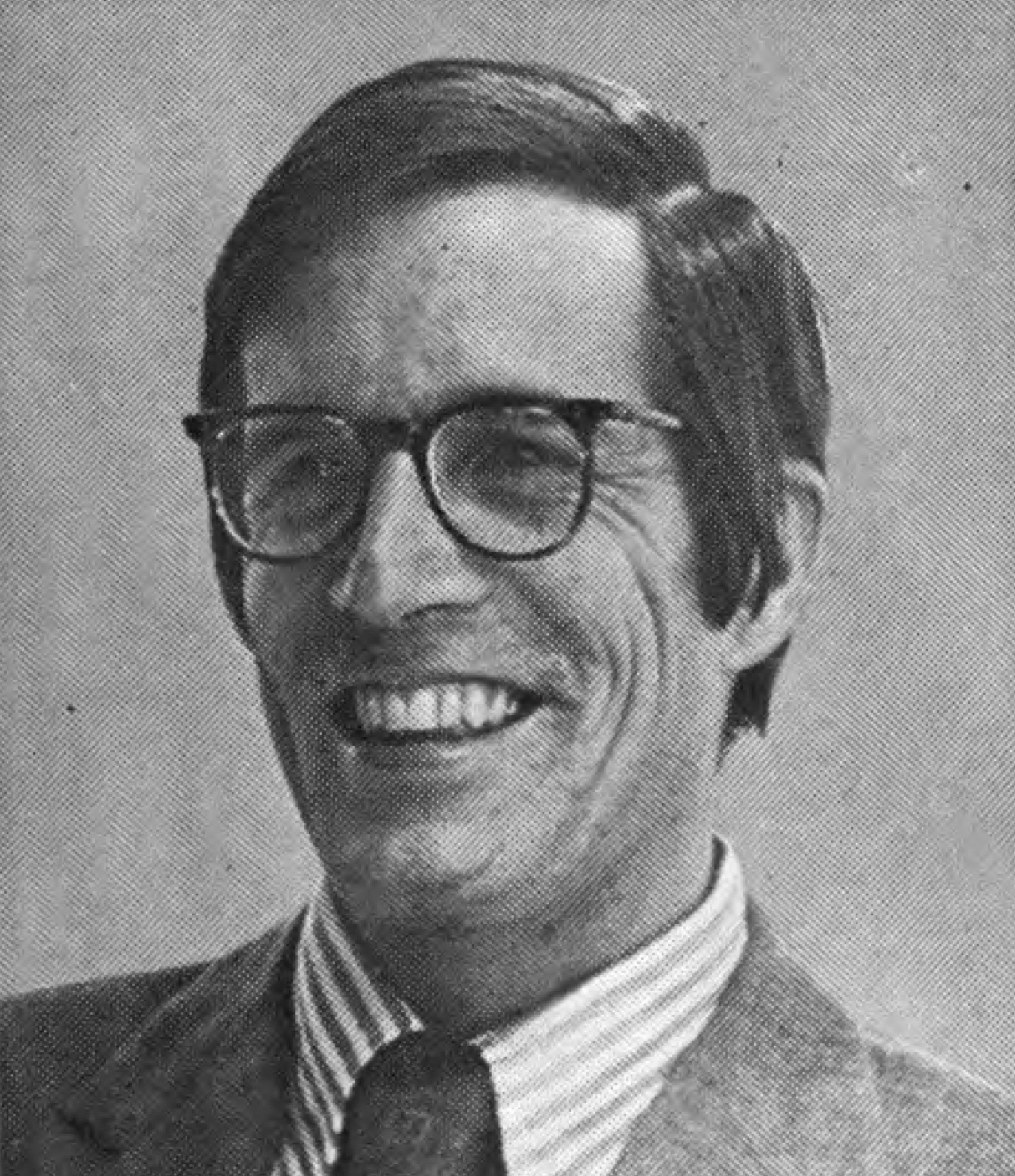

Nominee	Pete du Pont	James R. Soles
Party	Republican	Democratic
Popular vote	93,826	63,490
Percentage	58.5%	39.6%
- County results Pont: 50–60%
U.S. Representative before election
Pete du Pont
Republican
Elected U.S. Representative
Pete du Pont
Republican

The 1974 United States House of Representatives election in Delaware took place on November 5, 1974. Incumbent Republican Pete du Pont won re-election over Democrat candidate Norma Handloff with 58.52% of the vote against his opponent's 39.60% of the vote.

== Results ==
General election results
Party	Candidate	Votes	%
Republican	Pete du Pont	93,826	58.52%
Democratic	James R. Soles	63,490	39.60%
American Independent	Donald G. Gies	1,250	0.78%
Public Congress	John Trager	1,241	-0.77%
Prohibition	George C. Brown	370	0.23%
U.S. Labor	Melvin Dillard	151	0.09%
Total votes		160,328	100.00%
Republican hold			
