= Henry Latimer (politician) =

American politician

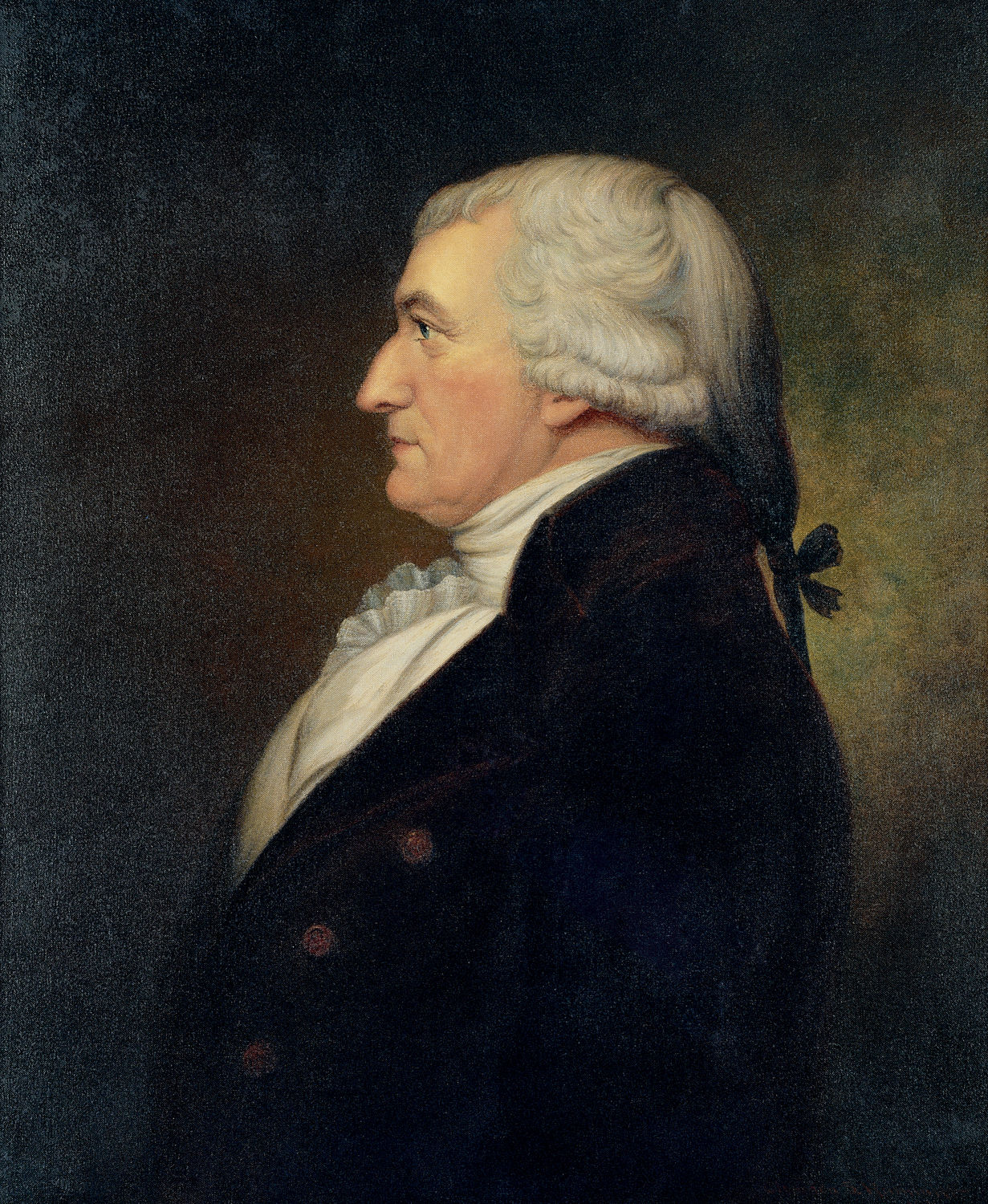
- Posthumous Portrait, c. 1916

United States Senator from Delaware
- In office February 7, 1795 – February 28, 1801
- Preceded by: George Read
- Succeeded by: Samuel White

Member of the U.S. House of Representatives from Delaware's at-large district
- In office February 14, 1794 – February 7, 1795
- Preceded by: John Patten
- Succeeded by: John Patten

Member of the Delaware General Assembly
- In office October 20, 1787 - October 20, 1791

Continental Congressman from Delaware
- In office April 8, 1784 – June 3, 1784

Personal details
- Born: April 24, 1752 Newport, Delaware Colony, British America
- Died: December 19, 1819 (aged 67) Philadelphia, Pennsylvania, U.S.
- Party: Federalist
- Spouse: Ann Richardson
- Education: College of Philadelphia; University of Edinburgh Medical School
- Profession: physician

Henry Latimer (April 24, 1752 – December 19, 1819) was an American physician and politician from Newport, Delaware. He was elected to the Continental Congress from Delaware, and was a member of the Federalist Party, who served in the Delaware General Assembly, as U.S. Representative from Delaware, and U.S. Senator from Delaware.

== Early life and family ==
Latimer was born in Newport in the Delaware Colony, son of James Latimer Sr. and Sarah Geddes. His father was a wealthy grain shipper and politician, who was a member of the House of Assembly in the 1778/79 session and a member of the Delaware convention that ratified the U.S. Constitution on December 7, 1787. Latimer's brother, George, also served in the House of Assembly from the 1779/80 session through the 1781/82 session. Later he moved to Philadelphia where he became Speaker of the Pennsylvania House of Representatives in 1794.

Latimer studied medicine, and attended the College of Philadelphia (now the University of Pennsylvania) in Philadelphia and graduated in 1770, going to University of Edinburgh Medical School in Scotland in 1775 to complete his education. Returning in the midst of the American Revolution, he served in the "Flying Hospital," a mobile surgical unit of the Continental Army. He was at the Battle of Brandywine and continued through the end of the war. After the war he was an original member of the Society of the Cincinnati.

== Professional and political career ==
Elected to the Continental Congress on April 8, 1784, Latimer never attended the session that spring in Annapolis, Maryland and was replaced. Like his father and brother, he was elected to the House of Assembly and served from the 1787/88 session through the 1790/91 session. He was the Speaker in that last session.

Latimer lost the 1792 election for the U.S. House to Major John Patten by thirty votes, but contested Patton's election to the U.S. House. The Federalist majority there reviewed the ballots cast, and based on a confusing law requiring the names of two candidates on the ballot, disqualified enough of Patton's votes to award the seat to Latimer. Amidst considerable bitterness, he was seated February 14, 1794. After once again losing an election to Patten in 1794, Latimer resigned from the U.S. House on February 7, 1795, when he was elected by the Delaware General Assembly to the disputed and long vacant U.S. Senate seat of retired U.S. Senator George Read. After finishing Read's term, he was reelected in 1796, and served until February 28, 1801, when he also resigned. Some believe that the reason for his resignation was that he was unhappy over the tactics of his political opponents who were still bitter over the circumstances of the contested election in 1792.

At various times Latimer was a member of the Wilmington Academy board, director of the Bank of Delaware, president of the First Agricultural Society of New Castle County, and president of the Board of Trustees of Newark College. He was a charter member of the Delaware Medical Society.

== Death and legacy ==
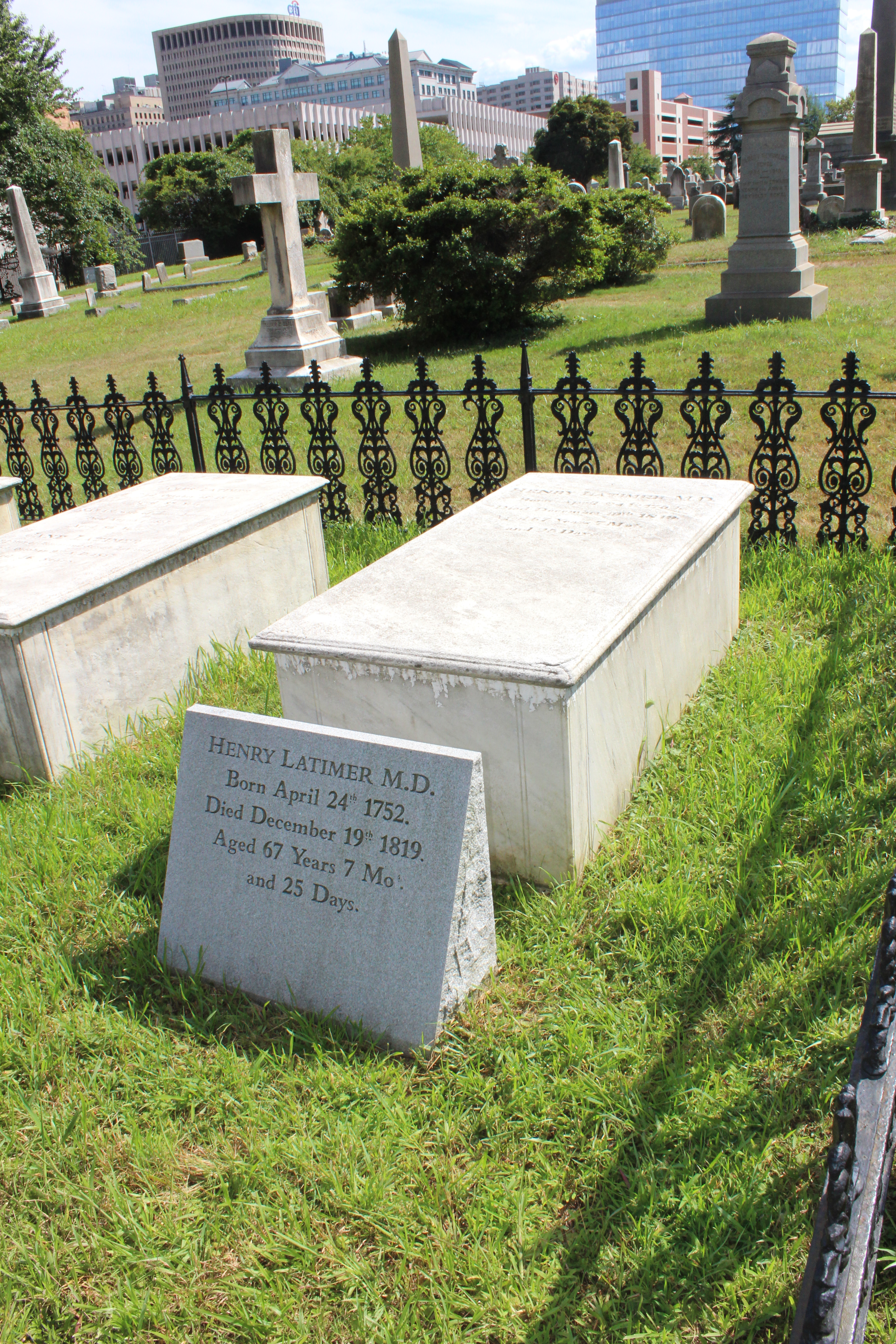
Henry Latimer Grave in Wilmington and Brandywine Cemetery

Latimer died at Philadelphia and was buried first in the Presbyterian Cemetery in Wilmington. This cemetery is now the location of the Wilmington Institute Library and his remains were then moved to the Wilmington and Brandywine Cemetery.

Even though he was a physician and a Presbyterian, Latimer was a member of a prominent and well-to-do merchant family and was very much in agreement with the prevailing Federalist positions on such controversial issues as the Jay Treaty and other measures of the Adams administration. The burgeoning party of Thomas Jefferson, now known as the Democratic-Republicans, was increasingly popular and vocal in heavily Irish and "Country Party" New Castle County, and they never seemed to forgive him his apparent theft of the 1792 congressional election. Consequently, upon celebrating election victories in 1802, they fired cannon, loaded with potatoes and herring, in mock salute to Latimer, remembering his reputed statement that "the laboring classes lived too well to be happy and should be reduced to the fare of the Irish."

== Almanac ==
Elections were held October 1. Members of the General Assembly took office on October 20 or the following weekday. The State Assemblymen were elected for a one-year term. They chose the Continental Congressmen for a one-year term. U.S. Representatives took office March 4 and have a two-year term.

The General Assembly chose the U.S. Senators, who also took office March 4, but for a six-year term. In this case he was initially completing the existing term, the vacancy caused by the resignation of George Read. However, the General Assembly failed to fill the position for nearly a year and a half.

After 1792 elections were moved to the first Tuesday of October and members of the General Assembly took office on the first Tuesday of January. The State Legislative Council was renamed the State Senate and the State House of Assembly was renamed the State House of Representatives.

Public Offices
Office	Type	Location	Began office	Ended office	notes
Continental Congress	Legislature	Annapolis	April 8, 1784	June 3, 1784	never attended
State Representative	Legislature	Dover	October 20, 1787	October 20, 1788	
State Representative	Legislature	Dover	October 20, 1788	October 20, 1789	
State Representative	Legislature	Dover	October 20, 1789	October 20, 1790	
State Representative	Legislature	Dover	October 20, 1790	October 20, 1791	Speaker
U.S. Representative	Legislature	Washington	February 14, 1794	February 7, 1795	
U.S. Senator	Legislature	Washington	February 7, 1795	March 3, 1797	
U.S. Senator	Legislature	Washington	March 4, 1797	February 28, 1801	

Delaware General Assembly service
Dates	Assembly	Chamber	Majority	Governor	Committees	District
1787/88	12th	State House	non-partisan	Thomas Collins		New Castle at-large
1788/89	13th	State House	non-partisan	Thomas Collins; Jehu Davis; Joshua Clayton		New Castle at-large
1789/90	14th	State House	non-partisan	Joshua Clayton		New Castle at-large
1790/91	15th	State House	non-partisan	Joshua Clayton		New Castle at-large

United States Congressional service
Dates	Congress	Chamber	Majority	President	Committees	Class/District
1793–1795	3rd	U.S. House	Anti- Administration	George Washington		at-large
1793–1795	3rd	U.S. Senate	Pro-Administration	George Washington		class 1
1795–1797	4th	U.S. Senate	Federalist	George Washington		class 1
1797–1799	5th	U.S. Senate	Federalist	John Adams		class 1
1799–1801	6th	U.S. Senate	Federalist	John Adams		class 1

Election results
Year	Office	Subject	Party	Votes	%	Opponent	Party	Votes	%
1792	U.S. Representative	Henry Latimer	Federalist	2,243	50%	John Patten	Republican	2,273	50%
1794	U.S. Representative	Henry Latimer	Federalist	2,285	49%	John Patten	Republican	2,409	51%

== Images ==
- United States Senate ; Portrait courtesy of the United States Senate, Art & History.

== Places with more information ==
- Delaware Historical Society; website; 505 North Market Street, Wilmington, Delaware 19801; (302) 655–7161
- University of Delaware; Library website; 181 South College Avenue, Newark, Delaware 19717; (302) 831-2965

U.S. House of Representatives
Preceded by John Patten	Member of the U.S. House of Representatives from Delaware's at-large congressional district 1794–1795	Succeeded by John Patten
U.S. Senate
Preceded by George Read	U.S. senator from Delaware; 1795–1801	Succeeded by Samuel White
