= Lisa Blunt Rochester =

American politician (born 1962)

- Official portrait, 2025

United States Senator from Delaware
- Incumbent
- Assumed office January 3, 2025 Serving with Chris Coons
- Preceded by: Tom Carper

Member of the U.S. House of Representatives from Delaware's at-large district
- In office January 3, 2017 – January 3, 2025
- Preceded by: John Carney
- Succeeded by: Sarah McBride

Personal details
- Born: Lisa LaTrelle Blunt; February 10, 1962 (age 64) Philadelphia, Pennsylvania, U.S.
- Party: Democratic
- Spouses: Alex Bradley (m. 1982; div. 2003); Charles Rochester (m. 2006; died 2014)
- Children: 2
- Relatives: Ted Blunt (father)
- Education: Villanova University (attended); Fairleigh Dickinson University (BA); University of Delaware (MA)
- Website: Senate website Campaign website
- Blunt Rochester's voice Blunt Rochester on the fifth anniversary of the January 6 Capitol attack Recorded January 6, 2026

Lisa LaTrelle Blunt Rochester (née Blunt; born February 10, 1962) is an American politician and former management consultant serving since 2025 as the junior United States senator from Delaware. A member of the Democratic Party, she previously served as the U.S. representative for Delaware's at-large congressional district from 2017 to 2025. Blunt Rochester is the first woman and first African American to represent Delaware in each chamber of Congress.

Blunt Rochester began her political career working for Tom Carper, first in the House of Representatives, and later as he became governor of Delaware. She was appointed deputy secretary of Delaware's Department of Health and Social Services in 1993 and secretary of the Department of Labor in 1998. Blunt Rochester was first elected to the U.S. House of Representatives in 2016. During the 2020 presidential election, she was one of Joe Biden's campaign co-chairs.

After Carper announced he would not seek reelection to the Senate in 2024, Blunt Rochester announced her candidacy and received his support, winning the general election after winning the Democratic nomination unopposed.

== Early life and education ==
Blunt Rochester was born in Philadelphia, Pennsylvania, on February 10, 1962. Her family moved to Wilmington, Delaware, in 1969. Her father, Ted Blunt, was an educator who served on the Wilmington City Council, including as council president. Her mother, Alice LaTrelle, worked in retail. Her sister Marla Blunt Carter is a professor at Rutgers University.

Blunt Rochester attended Padua Academy, began college at Villanova University and transferred to the University of Delaware in her sophomore year. She left college to live in Europe, and later received her Bachelor of Arts in international relations from Fairleigh Dickinson University and her Master of Arts in urban affairs and public policy from the University of Delaware.

== Early political career ==
Blunt Rochester worked for Tom Carper as an intern in 1989, when he represented Delaware's at-large congressional district in the United States House of Representatives. After the internship, she continued to work for Carper as a constituent relations caseworker, and worked on his transition team when he was elected governor of Delaware. Carper appointed her deputy secretary of the Department of Health and Social Services in 1993 and secretary of the Department of Labor in 1998. Governor Ruth Ann Minner named Blunt Rochester the state personnel director in 2001.

In 2004, Blunt Rochester left government service and became the CEO of the Metropolitan Wilmington Urban League.

== U.S. House of Representatives ==
=== Elections ===
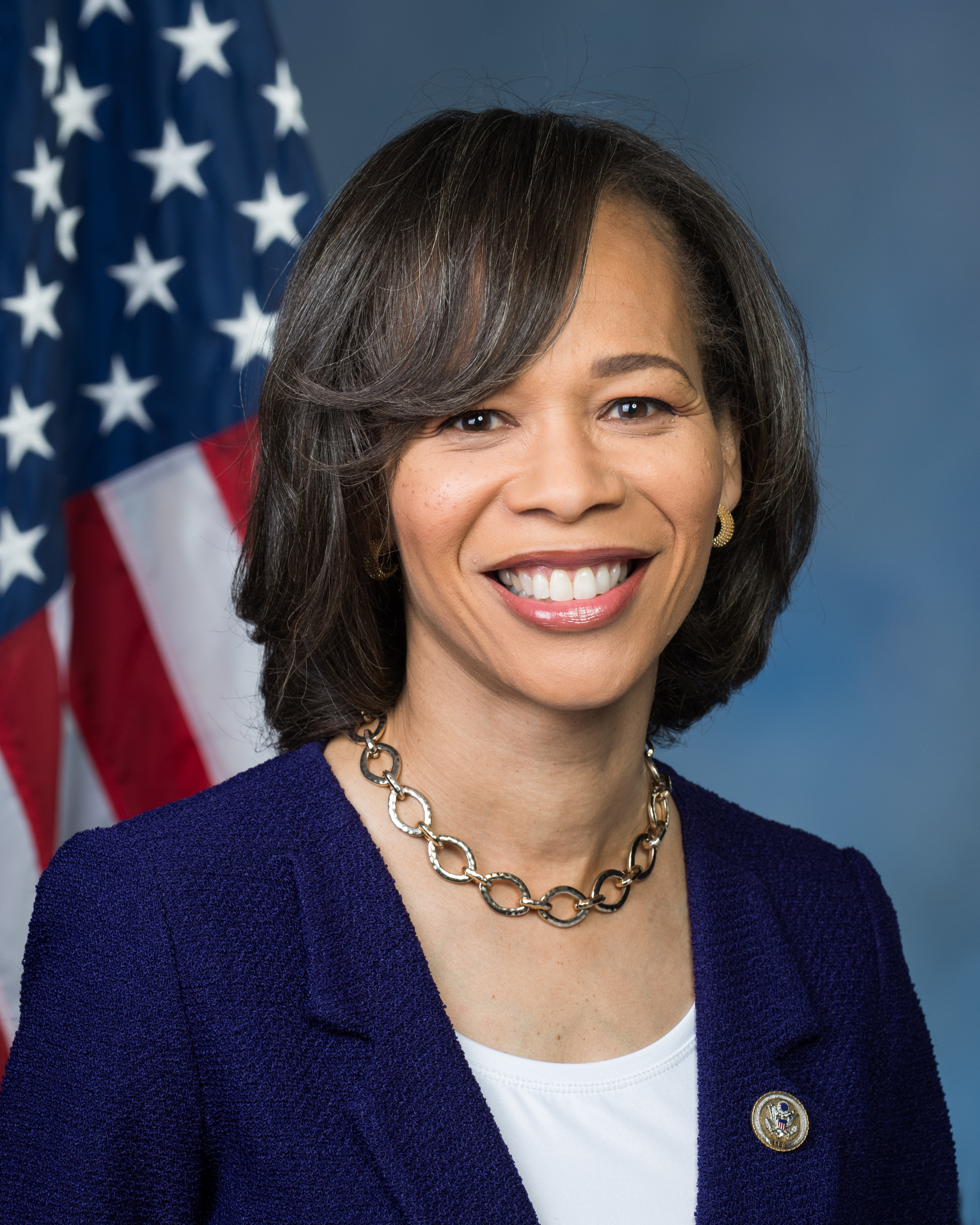
Representative Blunt Rochester during the 115th Congress in 2017.

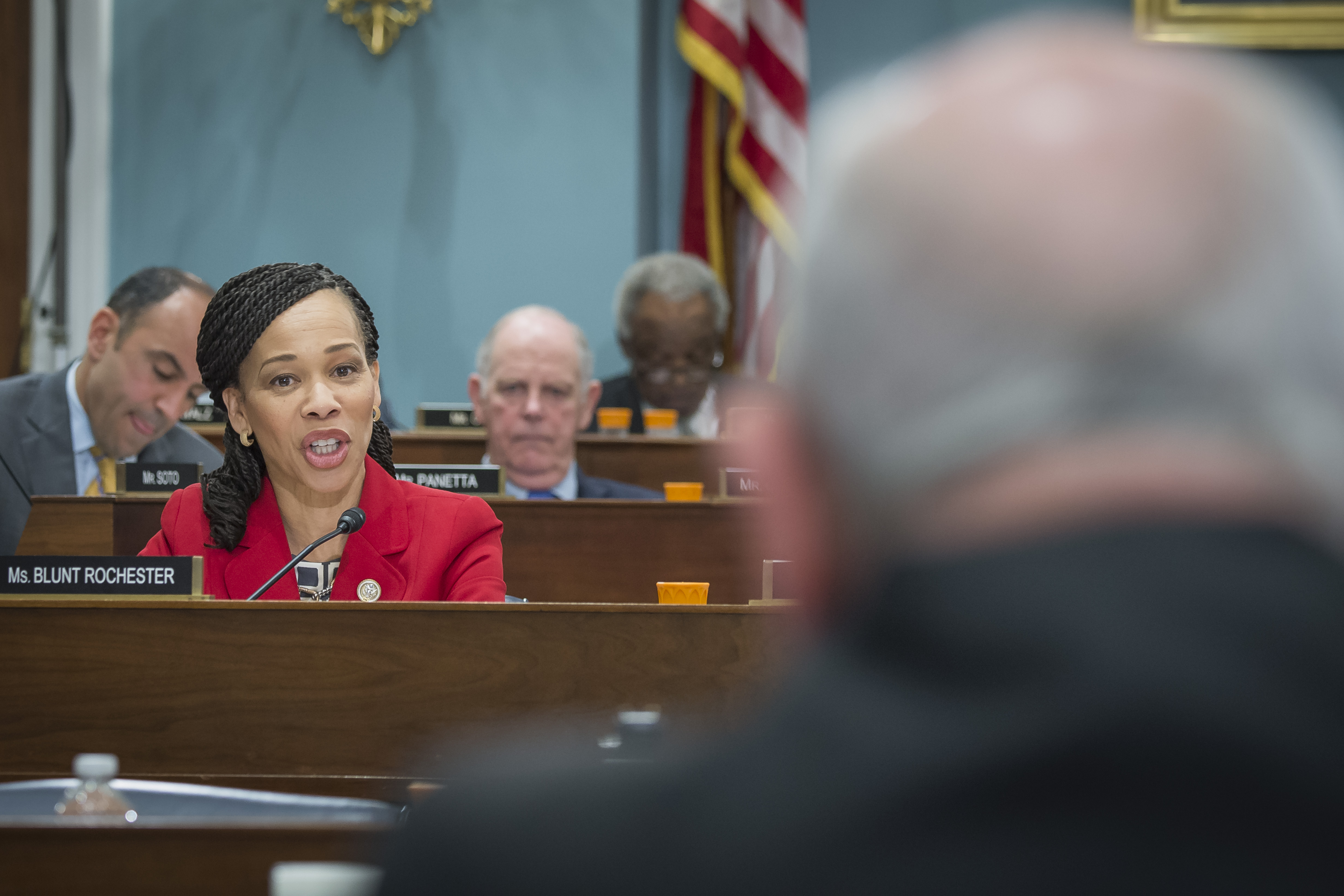
Lisa Blunt Rochester questioning Agriculture Secretary Sonny Perdue about the Supplemental Nutrition Assistance Program (SNAP) during a hearing in front of the House Committee on Agriculture in Washington, D.C., May 17, 2017.

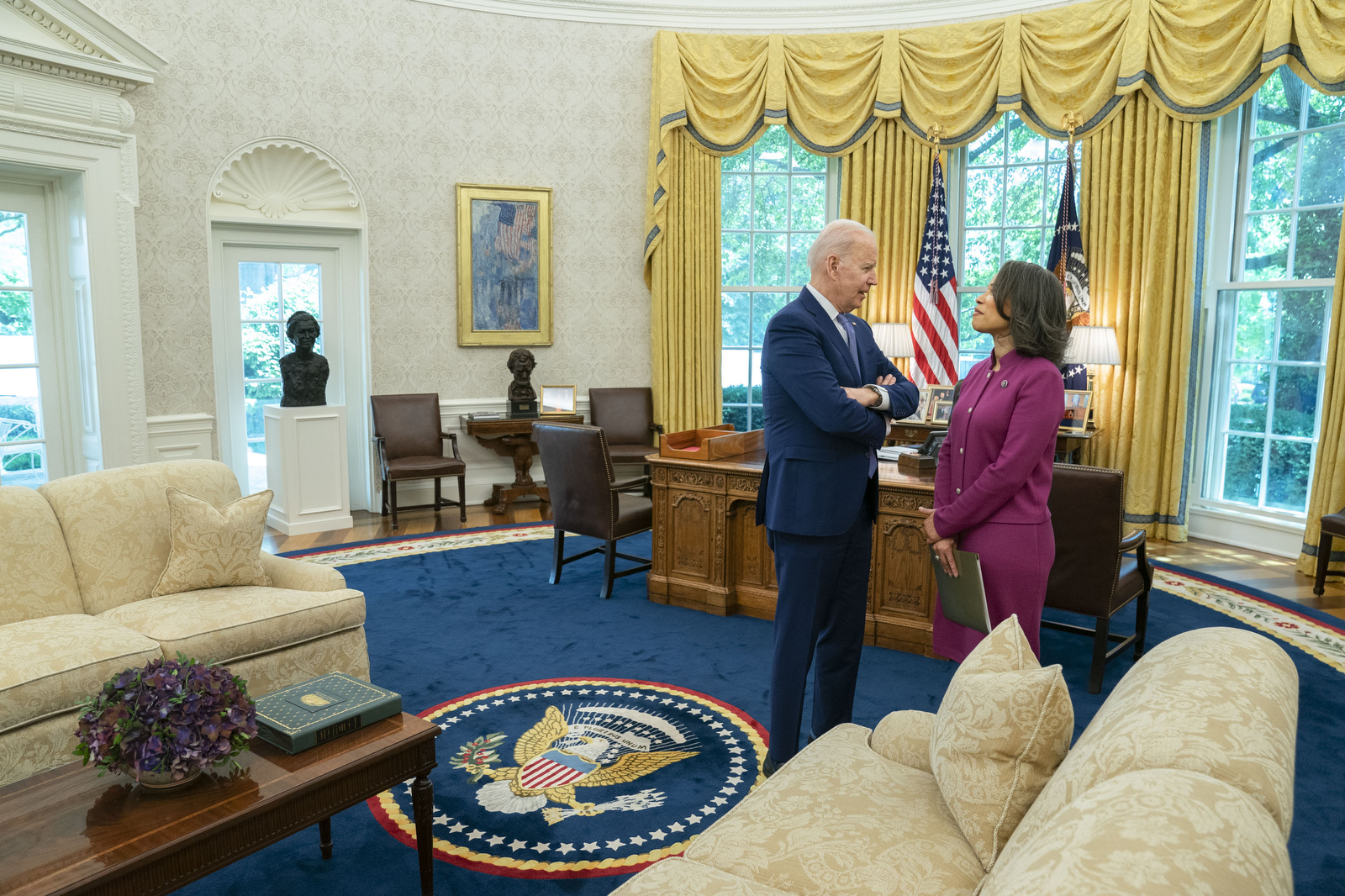
Lisa Blunt Rochester with President Joe Biden in the Oval Office, May 26, 2021

Blunt Rochester ran for the United States House of Representatives in Delaware's at-large congressional district in the 2016 election. She won the Democratic Party nomination on September 13 with 44% of the vote in a five-candidate primary, defeating State Senator Bryan Townsend and venture capital firm owner Sean Barney. In the November 8 general election, she defeated the Republican nominee, Wyoming Mayor Hans Reigle. When she was sworn into office on January 3, 2017, she became the first woman and the first African-American to represent Delaware in Congress. During her swearing-in, she carried a scarf imprinted with her great-great-great-grandfather's Reconstruction Era voter registration card. He had been a slave.

=== Tenure ===
On December 18, 2019, Blunt Rochester voted for both articles of impeachment against President Donald Trump.

During the 2021 storming of the United States Capitol, Blunt Rochester was ushered into a secure room with fellow members of Congress. Despite House rules on mask mandates, many Republican members, including Marjorie Taylor Greene of Georgia, abstained from wearing a mask. A clip went viral of Blunt Rochester offering masks to her Republican colleagues, in which they seemingly mocked and refused her offer. In the following days, multiple members tested positive for COVID-19.

Blunt Rochester voted to impeach Trump a second time on January 13, 2021.

As of 2022, Blunt Rochester had voted with President Joe Biden's stated position 100% of the time, according to FiveThirtyEight.

==== 2020 presidential election ====
Blunt Rochester played an active role in the 2020 presidential election. After Biden became the presumptive Democratic nominee in March 2020, his campaign named her one of its co-chairs. At the end of April, Blunt Rochester was named a member of the vetting committee for Biden's vice presidential candidate selection.

Blunt Rochester was a 2020 Democratic National Convention speaker.

==== 2024 presidential election ====
Blunt Rochester was national co-chair of Biden's 2024 reelection campaign, and endorsed Kamala Harris on July 21, 2024, the day Biden withdrew from the race.

=== Committee assignments ===
For the 118th Congress:

- Committee on Energy and Commerce
  - Subcommittee on Energy, Climate, and Grid Security
  - Subcommittee on Health
  - Subcommittee on Innovation, Data, and Commerce

=== Caucus memberships ===
- Black Maternal Health Caucus
- Congressional Arts Caucus
- Congressional Black Caucus
- Congressional Progressive Caucus
- Future of Work Caucus (founder/co-chair)
- New Democrat Coalition
- Rare Disease Caucus
- Congressional Coalition on Adoption

== U.S. Senate ==
=== Elections ===
==== 2024 ====
On June 21, 2023, Blunt Rochester announced her candidacy for the United States Senate in the 2024 election to succeed Tom Carper. Carper endorsed Blunt Rochester as his successor at his press conference announcing his retirement. She was widely considered the heavy favorite to win both the Democratic primary and the general election. Blunt Rochester won the election with 57% of the vote to Republican nominee Eric Hansen's 40%.

=== Committee assignments ===
- Committee on Banking, Housing, and Urban Affairs
  - Subcommittee on Economic Policy
  - Subcommittee on Housing, Transportation, and Community Development
  - Subcommittee on Securities, Insurance, and Investment
- Committee on Commerce, Science, and Transportation
- Committee on Environment and Public Works
  - Subcommittee on Transportation and Infrastructure
  - Subcommittee on Clean Air, Climate, and Nuclear Innovation and Safety
  - Subcommittee on Chemical Safety, Waste Management, Environmental Justice and Regulatory Oversight
- Committee on Health, Education, Labor and Pensions
  - Subcommittee on Education and the American Family (Ranking Member)
  - Subcommittee on Primary Health and Retirement Security

== Personal life ==
Blunt Rochester was married to her first husband, professional basketball player Alex Bradley, from 1982 to 2003. They met at Villanova University and lived in Italy and France while he played basketball professionally. They have two children together. The marriage ended with an amicable divorce in 2003.

She met her second husband, Charles Rochester, later in 2003. They married in 2006. Charles died in 2014 when his Achilles tendon ruptured, causing blood clots to go to his heart and lungs.

Blunt Rochester is a Protestant.

While living in China, Blunt Rochester co-authored the book Thrive: 34 Women, 18 Countries, One Goal.

== Electoral history ==
2016 Delaware at-large congressional district election
Primary election
Party	Candidate	Votes	%
Democratic	Lisa Blunt Rochester	27,920	43.77%
Democratic	Bryan Townsend	15,847	24.84%
Democratic	Sean Barney	12,891	20.21%
Democratic	Michael C. Miller, Sr.	3,500	5.49%
Democratic	Scott Walker	3,156	4.94%
Democratic	Elias J. Weir	480	0.75%
Total votes		63,794	100.00%
General election
Democratic	Lisa Blunt Rochester	233,554	55.53%
Republican	Hans Reigle	172,301	40.96%
Green	Mark J. Perri	8,326	1.98%
Libertarian	Scott A. Gesty	6,436	1.53%
Total votes		420,617	100.00%
Democratic hold			

2018 Delaware at-large congressional district election
Party	Candidate	Votes	%
Democratic	Lisa Blunt Rochester	227,353	64.45%
Republican	Scott Walker	125,384	35.55%
Total votes		352,737	100.00%
Democratic hold			

2020 Delaware at-large congressional district election
Party	Candidate	Votes	%
Democratic	Lisa Blunt Rochester	281,382	57.63%
Republican	Lee Murphy	196,392	40.22%
Independent Party	Catherine S. Purcell	6,682	1.37%
Libertarian	David L. Rodgers	3,814	0.78%
Total votes		488,270	100.00%
Democratic hold			

2022 Delaware at-large congressional district election
Party	Candidate	Votes	%
Democratic	Lisa Blunt Rochester	178,416	55.47%
Republican	Lee Murphy	138,201	42.97%
Libertarian	Cody McNutt	3,074	0.96%
Independent	David Rogers	1,958	0.61%
Total votes		321,649	100.00%
Democratic hold			

2024 United States Senator election in Delaware
Party	Candidate	Votes	%
Democratic	Lisa Blunt Rochester	283,298	56.59%
Republican	Eric Hansen	197,753	39.50%
Independent Party	Michael Katz	19,555	3.91%
Total votes		500,606	100.00%
Democratic hold			

== Book ==
- Blunt Rochester, Lisa; Guzman, Ale; Kuguru, Ruth (2010). Thrive: Thirty-four Women, Eighteen Countries, One Goal. Hong Kong: Grace Publishing Company Ltd. ISBN 978-9881922014. OCLC 707711787.

== See also ==
- List of African-American United States representatives
- Women in the United States House of Representatives
- List of African-American United States senators
- Women in the United States Senate
- List of African-American United States Senate candidates
- List of new members of the 119th United States Congress

U.S. House of Representatives
Preceded by John Carney	Member of the U.S. House of Representatives from Delaware's at-large congressional district 2017–2025	Succeeded by Sarah McBride
Party political offices
Preceded by Tom Carper	Democratic nominee for U.S. Senator from Delaware (Class 1); 2024	Most recent
U.S. Senate
Preceded by Tom Carper	U.S. Senator (Class 1) from Delaware; 2025–present Served alongside: Chris Coons	Incumbent
U.S. order of precedence (ceremonial)
Preceded by Adam Schiff	Order of precedence of the United States as United States Senator	Succeeded by Dave McCormick
Preceded by Jim Banks	United States senators by seniority 89th	Succeeded by John Curtis
