= 2024 New Castle County Executive election =

2024 Delaware election

- November 5, 2024
Nominee	Marcus Henry
Party	Democratic
Popular vote	204,846
Percentage	100.00%
County Executive before election
Matt Meyer
Democratic
Elected County Executive
Marcus Henry
Democratic

The 2024 New Castle County Executive election was held on Tuesday, November 5, 2024, to elect the County Executive of New Castle County, Delaware. Incumbent Democratic County Executive Matt Meyer was re-elected in 2020 in an unopposed general election after defeating a primary challenge. Meyer announced on June 6, 2023, that he would not seek a third term as County Executive and would instead run for governor.

Former New Castle County Economic Development Director Marcus Henry and incumbent New Castle County Council President Karen Hartley-Nagle ran for the Democratic nomination. On September 10, 2024, Henry defeated Hartley-Nagle by a 21-point margin.

On November 5, 2024, Henry was officially elected County Executive.

== Democratic primary ==
=== Candidates ===
==== Nominee ====
- Marcus Henry, former New Castle County Economic Development Director (2011–2021)

==== Eliminated in primary ====
- Karen Hartley-Nagle, president of the New Castle County Council (2016–2024)

==== Declined ====
- Matt Meyer, incumbent County Executive (ran for governor)

=== Results ===
Democratic primary results
Party	Candidate	Votes	%
Democratic	Marcus Henry	32,408	60.6%
Democratic	Karen Hartley-Nagle	21,067	39.4%
Total votes		53,475	100%

== Republican primary ==
=== Candidates ===
==== Withdrawn ====
- Carter Hill

== General election results ==
2020 New Castle County Executive election
Party	Candidate	Votes	%	±%
Democratic	Marcus Henry	204,846	100.00%	+0.84%
Total votes		204,846	100.00%	
Democratic hold				
