= 1972 United States House of Representatives election in Delaware =

- November 7, 1972
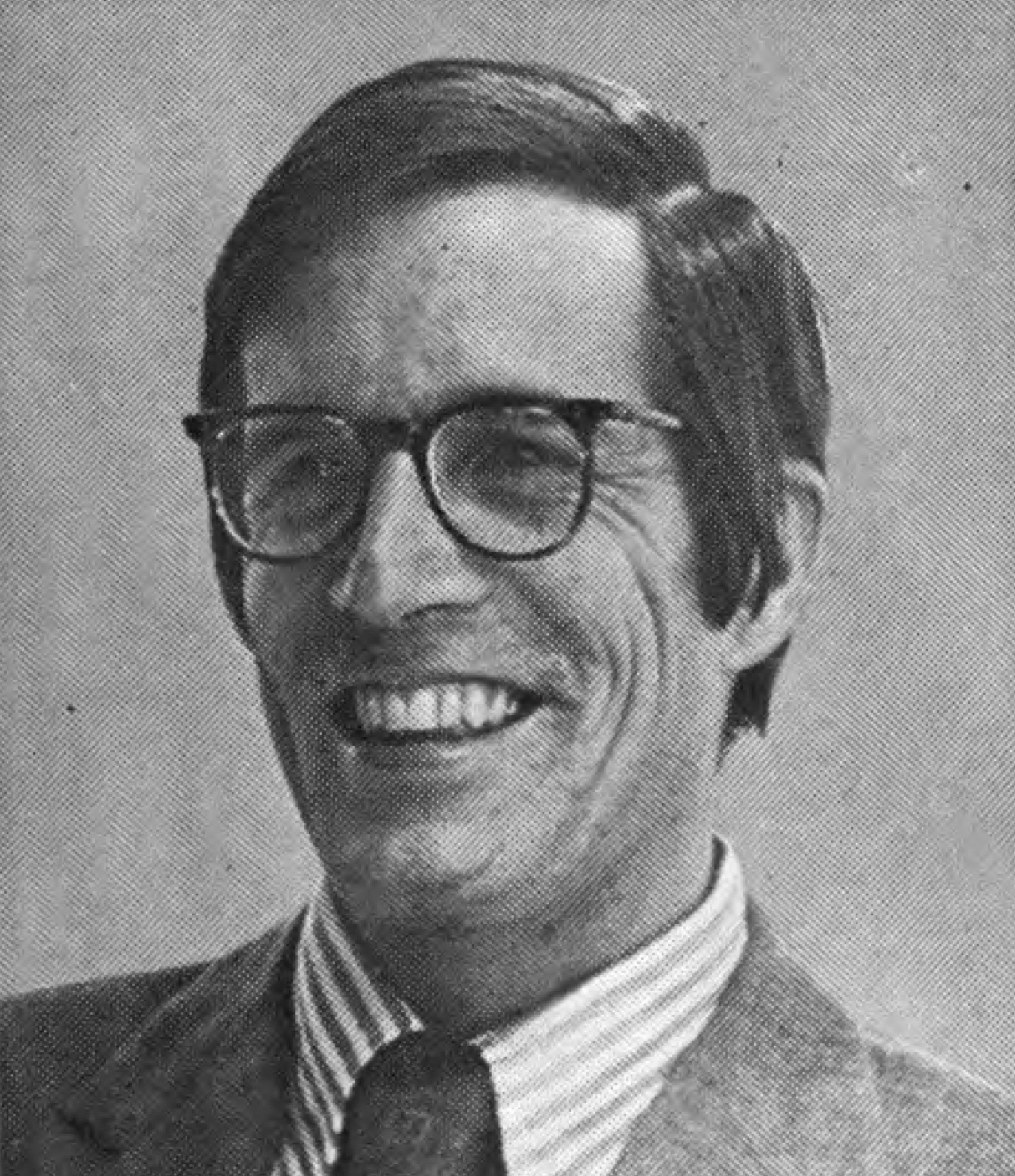

Nominee	Pete du Pont	Norma Handloff
Party	Republican	Democratic
Popular vote	141,237	83,320
Percentage	62.5%	36.9%
- County results Roth: 60–70%
U.S. Representative before election
William Roth
Republican
Elected U.S. Representative
Pete du Pont
Republican

The 1972 United States House of Representatives election in Delaware took place on November 7, 1972. Incumbent Republican, Pete du Pont won re-election over Democrat candidate Norma Handloff with 62.54% of the vote.

== Results ==
General election results
Party	Candidate	Votes	%	±%
Republican	Pete du Pont	141,237	62.54%	▲8.8
Democratic	Norma Handloff	83,320	36.89%	▼7.7
American Independent	Robert G. LoPresti	1,120	0.50%	▼1.2
Prohibition	Rachel Dickerson	264	0.12%	
Total votes		225,851	100.00%	
Republican hold				
