= 1805 Delaware's at-large congressional district special election =

- October 1, 1805
Candidate	James M. Broom	David Hall
Party	Federalist	Democratic-Republican
Popular vote	3,011	2,682
Percentage	52.65%	46.90%
U.S. representative before election
James A. Bayard
Federalist
Elected U.S. representative
James M. Broom
Federalist

A special election was held in Delaware's at-large congressional district on October 1, 1805, to fill a vacancy resulting from the resignation of James A. Bayard, a Federalist, upon election to the Senate. Bayard had earlier served in the House in the 5th, 6th, and 7th congresses before being narrowly defeated for re-election in 1802 by Caesar A. Rodney, whom he, in turn, defeated in 1804.

Broom took his seat with the rest of the 9th Congress on December 2, 1805.

== Election returns ==
1805 Delaware's at-large congressional district special election
Party	Candidate	Votes	%
Federalist	James M. Broom	3,011	52.65
Democratic-Republican	David Hall	2,682	46.90
Democratic-Republican	Isaac Starr	24	0.42
Unknown	Hugh W. Richie	2	0.04
Majority		329	5.75
Total votes		5,719	100.00
Federalist hold			

=== Results by county ===
County	Broom#	Broom%	Hall#	Hall%	Starr#	Starr%	Richie#	Richie%	Total
Kent	966	61.06%	593	37.48%	23	1.45%			1,582
New Castle	683	32.63%	1,407	67.22%	1	0.05%	2	0.10%	2,093
Sussex	1,362	66.63%	682	33.37%					2,044

== See also ==
- 1804 and 1805 United States House of Representatives elections
- List of special elections to the United States House of Representatives
