= 2020 United States House of Representatives election in Delaware =

2020 United States House of Representatives election in Delaware, at-large district
- November 3, 2020
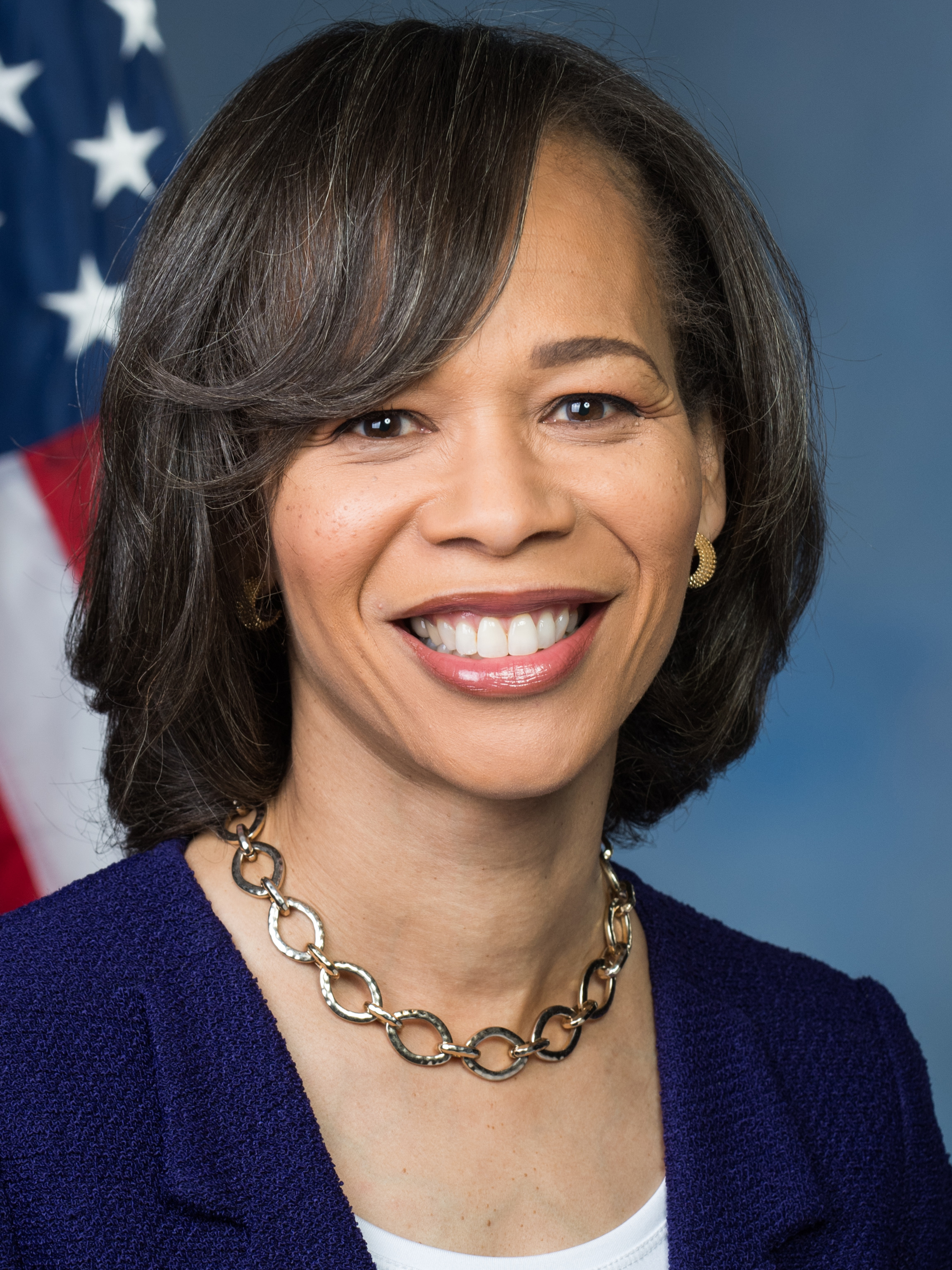

Candidate	Lisa Blunt Rochester	Lee Murphy
Party	Democratic	Republican
Popular vote	281,382	196,392
Percentage	57.63%	40.22%
- Rochester: 40–50% 50–60% 60–70% 70–80% 80–90% >90% Murphy: 40–50% 50–60% 60–70% 70–80% 80–90% No data
U.S. Representative before election
Lisa Blunt Rochester
Democratic
Elected U.S. Representative
Lisa Blunt Rochester
Democratic

The 2020 United States House of Representatives election in Delaware was held on November 3, 2020, to elect the U.S. representative from Delaware's at-large congressional district. The election coincided with the 2020 U.S. presidential election, as well as other elections to the House of Representatives, elections to the United States Senate and various state and local elections. The Democratic and Republican primaries was held on September 15, 2020.

Incumbent Democratic Congresswoman Lisa Blunt Rochester ran for re-election to a third term. She was re-elected with 64.5% of the vote in 2018.

The Republican nominee was Lee Murphy, a private citizen who worked for most of his life at Amtrak as a conductor and manager. Murphy had also worked as an actor and had appeared in Netflix's House of Cards.

== Democratic primary ==
=== Candidates ===
==== Nominee ====
- Lisa Blunt Rochester, incumbent U.S. representative

==== Declined ====
- Scott Walker, Republican nominee for Delaware's at-large congressional district in 2018 (ran for Governor as a Republican)

=== Endorsements ===
Lisa Blunt Rochester

Organizations

- Sierra Club

== Republican primary ==
=== Candidates ===
==== Nominee ====
- Lee Murphy, actor and candidate for Delaware's at-large congressional district in 2018

==== Eliminated in primary ====
- Matthew Morris, sales consultant

=== Results ===
Republican primary results
Party	Candidate	Votes	%
Republican	Lee Murphy	39,179	73.81%
Republican	Matthew Morris	13,901	26.19%
Total votes		53,080	100.00%

== Libertarian primary ==
=== Candidates ===
==== Nominee ====
- David L. Rogers

== Independent Party of Delaware ==
=== Declared ===
- Catherine S. Purcell, college student and pro-Trump activist

== General election ==
=== Debate ===
2020 Delaware U.S. House of Representatives debate
No.	Date	Host	Moderator	Link	Democratic	Republican	Libertarian	Independent
Key: P Participant A Absent N Not invited I Invited W Withdrawn								
Key: P Participant A Absent N Not invited I Invited W Withdrawn					Lisa Blunt Rochester	Lee Murphy	David Rogers	Catherine Purcell
1	Oct. 14, 2020	University of Delaware	Ralph Begleiter		P	P	N	N

=== Predictions ===
Source	Ranking	As of
The Cook Political Report	Safe D	November 2, 2020
Inside Elections	Safe D	October 28, 2020
Sabato's Crystal Ball	Safe D	November 2, 2020
Politico	Safe D	November 2, 2020
Daily Kos	Safe D	November 2, 2020
RCP	Safe D	November 2, 2020

=== Polling ===
Poll source	Date(s) administered	Sample size (Note: Key: A – all adults RV – registered voters LV – likely voters V – unclear)	Margin of error	Lisa Blunt Rochester (D)	Lee Murphy (R)	Catherine Purcell (DI)	David Rogers (L)	Other/ Undecided
University of Delaware	September 21–27, 2020	847 (LV)	–	51%	29%	5%	3%	13% (Note: "None/other/undecided" with 13%)

=== Results ===
2020 Delaware's at-large congressional district election
Party	Candidate	Votes	%	±%
Democratic	Lisa Blunt Rochester (incumbent)	281,382	57.63%	−6.63%
Republican	Lee Murphy	196,392	40.22%	+4.78%
Independent Party	Catherine S. Purcell	6,682	1.37%	N/A
Libertarian	David L. Rogers	3,814	0.78%	N/A
Total votes		488,270	100.0%	N/A
Democratic hold				

County	Lisa Blunt Rochester Democratic		Lee Murphy Republican		Catherine Purcell Delaware Independent		David Rogers Libertarian		Margin		Total votes
County	#	%	#	%	#	%	#	%	#	%	Total votes
New Castle	184,337	66.31	87,581	31.50	3,831	1.38	2,255	0.81	96,796	34.82	278,004
Kent	42,984	50.79	39,586	46.78	1,284	1.52	768	0.91	3,398	4.01	84,622
Sussex	54,061	43.03	69,225	55.10	1,567	1.25	791	0.63	−15,164	−12.07	125,644
Totals	281,382	57.63	196,392	40.22	6,682	1.37	3,814	0.78	84,990	17.41	488,270
