= 2018 United States House of Representatives election in Delaware =

2018 United States House of Representatives election in Delaware, At-large district
- November 6, 2018
- Turnout: 50.84%
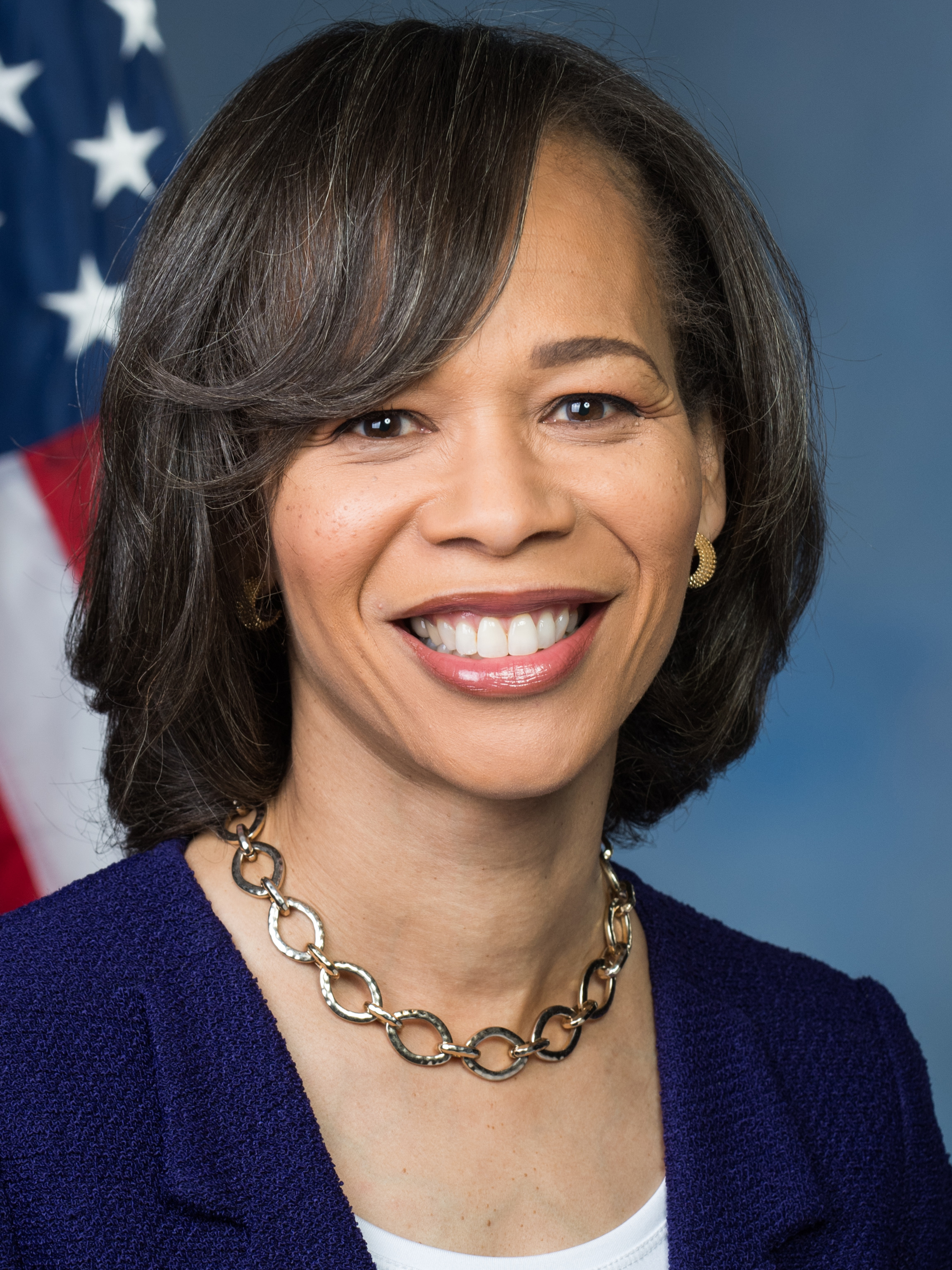

Candidate	Lisa Blunt Rochester	Scott Walker
Party	Democratic	Republican
Popular vote	227,353	125,384
Percentage	64.26%	35.44%
- Rochester: 50–60% 60–70% 70–80% 80–90% >90% Walker: 50–60% 60–70% 70–80% No data
U.S. Representative before election
Lisa Blunt Rochester
Democratic
Elected U.S. Representative
Lisa Blunt Rochester
Democratic

The 2018 United States House of Representatives election in Delaware was held on November 6, 2018, to elect the U.S. representative from Delaware's at-large congressional district, who will represent the state of Delaware in the 116th United States Congress. The election coincided with the election of a U.S. Senator from Delaware and other federal and state offices. Democratic Congresswoman Lisa Blunt Rochester, the incumbent, won re-election.

== Democratic primary ==
Lisa Blunt Rochester ran unopposed in the primary and automatically became the Democratic nominee.

=== Candidates ===
==== Nominee ====
- Lisa Blunt Rochester, incumbent U.S. Representative

==== Withdrew ====
- Rose Izzo, Republican candidate for the seat in 2016, 2014, and 2012 (ran for State House in District 7)

==== Declined ====
- Kerri Evelyn Harris, Dover activist and U.S. Air Force veteran (ran for U.S. Senate)

=== Endorsements ===
Lisa Blunt Rochester

Organizations

- Congressional Black Caucus PAC
- Delaware Women Legislators
- Democratic Party
- Human Rights Campaign
- Planned Parenthood
- Stonewall Democrats

== Republican primary ==
=== Candidates ===
==== Nominee ====
- Scott Walker, Republican candidate for the seat in 2016

==== Eliminated in primary ====
- Lee Murphy, retired railroad worker and actor (refused to concede)

==== Write-in ====
- Marvin Davis, far-rightist
- Lee Murphy, retired railroad worker and actor (not filed)
- Andrew Webb, community activist and student

=== Endorsements ===
Lee Murphy

Political candidates

- Gene Truono, Republican candidate for United States Senate

==== Primary results ====
Results by county: Walker—50–60% Murphy—50–60%

Republican primary results, Delaware 2018
Party	Candidate	Votes	%
Republican	Scott Walker	19,573	53.00%
Republican	Lee Murphy	17,359	47.00%
Total votes		36,932	100%

=== Controversy ===
Shortly after the final results for the Republican primary, controversy almost immediately emerged about Scott Walker’s victory, as Lee Murphy had been seen by many as the favorite to win. Murphy refused to concede and took to Facebook, saying, “Friends, thanks for all your support- something stinks here and I will not be conceding anytime soon. Need to investigate big time. A Dem wins a Republican primary?” Murphy also called for an investigation into the results. Walker responded by saying that God had led his campaign to victory. Student and community activist Andrew Webb declared his Republican write-in candidacy on September 17, 2018, hoping to gain support from dissatisfied Republicans. He announced a platform of more moderate/traditional conservative ideas.

== Libertarian Party ==
=== Candidates ===
==== Endorsed by Sussex County Chapter ====
- Andrew Webb, community activist and student (write-in)

== Independent Party of Delaware ==
=== Candidates ===
==== Write-in ====
- Andrew Webb, community activist and student

== Independents ==
=== Candidates ===
==== Declared ====
- Paul Johnston, veteran (write-in)

==== Withdrew ====
- Christopher Mockerman, activist (running for State House in District 17)

== General election ==
=== Endorsements ===
Lisa Blunt Rochester

U.S. Senators

- Tom Carper, U.S. Senator from Delaware
- Chris Coons, U.S. Senator from Delaware

Governors

- John Carney, 74th Governor of Delaware

Lt. Governors

- Bethany Hall-Long, 26th Lt. Governor of Delaware

Political candidates

- Don Allan, Democratic nominee for Delaware's 36th Representative district
- Colleen Davis, Democratic nominee for State Treasurer
- Dee Durham, Democratic nominee for New Castle County's 2nd council district
- Krista Griffith, Democratic nominee for Delaware's 12th Representative district
- Kathy Jennings, Democratic nominee for Delaware state Attorney General
- Elizabeth "Tizzy" Lockman, Delaware State Senator-elect for 3rd district
- Laura Sturgeon, Democratic nominee for Delaware's 4th Senate district

Individuals

- Coby Owens, social justice activist, CEO of Youth Caucus of America, and 2016 delegate for Bernie Sanders

Organizations

- Congressional Black Caucus PAC
- Delaware Division of Public Health
- Delaware Women Legislators
- Democratic Party
- Human Rights Campaign
- Mary Ann’s List
- Moms Demand Action for Gun Sense in America
- Planned Parenthood
- Sierra Club
- Stonewall Democrats
Scott Walker

Individuals

- Lil B, rapper
Andrew Webb (write-in)

County Councilpersons

- Rob Arlett, Sussex County Councilman and Republican nominee for U.S. Senate in Delaware

Individuals

- James Brittingham, Libertarian Party of Delaware Sussex County chairman

Organizations

- Independent Party of Delaware
- Libertarian Party of Delaware Sussex County Chapter
Declined to endorse

Declined to endorse Scott Walker

- Rob Arlett, Sussex County Councilman and Republican nominee for U.S. Senate in Delaware (endorsed Andrew Webb)
- Peter Kopf, former New Castle County Republican chairman
- Lee Murphy, former candidate
- Republican Party
- Andrew Webb, community activist and student (running as write-in)

=== Debates ===
- Full video of debate, University of Delaware October 17, 2018
- Full audio of debate, Delaware Public Media October 17, 2018

=== Predictions ===
Source	Ranking	As of
FiveThirtyEight	Solid D	September 2018
270towin	Safe D	October 2018

=== Polling ===
Poll source	Date(s) administered	Sample size	Margin of error	Lisa Blunt Rochester (D)	Scott Walker (R)	Undecided
University of Delaware	September 11–17, 2018	728 LV	–	58%	28%	15%
University of Delaware	September 11–17, 2018	908 RV	± 3.7%	54%	26%	20%
Gravis Marketing	July 24–29, 2018	884	± 3.3%	46%	38%	16%

Hypothetical polling

with Lisa Blunt Rochester and Lee Murphy

Poll source	Date(s) administered	Sample size	Margin of error	Lisa Blunt Rochester (D)	Lee Murphy (R)	Undecided
Gravis Marketing	July 24–29, 2018	884	± 3.3%	46%	39%	16%

=== Results ===
Delaware's at-large congressional district, 2018
Party	Candidate	Votes	%	±%
Democratic	Lisa Blunt Rochester (incumbent)	227,353	64.26%	+8.74%
Republican	Scott Walker	125,384	35.44%	−5.30%
Write-in		1,077	0.3%	
Total votes		353,814	100%	N/A
Democratic hold				

==== By county ====
County	Lisa Blunt Rochester Democratic		Scott Walker Republican		All Others	
County	#	%	#	%	#	%
New Castle	150,143	72.63%	56,213	27.19%	361	0.17%
Kent	33,162	57.13%	24,556	42.3%	332	0.57%
Sussex	44,048	49.47%	44,615	50.1%	384	0.43%
Totals	227,353	64.26%	125,384	35.44%	1,077	0.3%

Counties that flipped from Republican to Democratic

- Kent (largest city: Dover)
