= John Patten (American politician) =

American politician (1746–1800)

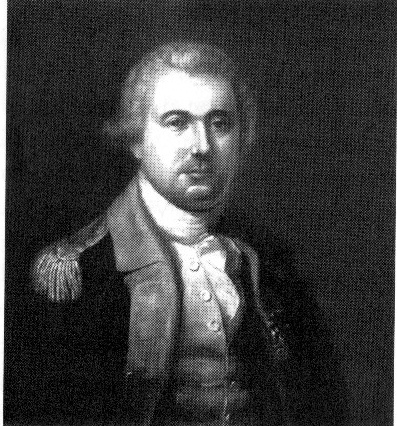

Member of the U.S. House of Representatives from Delaware's at-large district
- In office March 4, 1795 – March 3, 1797
- Preceded by: Henry Latimer
- Succeeded by: James A. Bayard Sr.
- In office March 4, 1793 – February 14, 1794
- Preceded by: John Vining
- Succeeded by: Henry Latimer

Continental Congressman from Delaware
- In office November 7, 1785 – November 3, 1786

Personal details
- Born: April 26, 1746 Kent County, Delaware Colony, British America
- Died: December 26, 1800 (aged 54) Dover, Delaware, U.S.
- Party: Democratic-Republican
- Spouses: Ann Haslet; Mary Miller Loockerman
- Occupation: Farmer

Major John Patten (April 26, 1746 – December 26, 1800) was a United States farmer and politician from Dover, in Kent County, Delaware. He was an officer of the Continental Army in the American Revolution, a Continental Congressman, and a member of the Democratic-Republican Party, who served in the Delaware General Assembly and as a United States representative from Delaware.

== Early life and family ==
Patten was born at Tyn Head Court near Dover in the Delaware Colony, son of John Patten and Ann Maxwell. This property is near Dover Air Force Base, near the farms of Caesar Rodney and John Dickinson. He was a farmer, who after the American Revolution married Ann Haslet, daughter of the first Colonel of the 1st Delaware Regiment, John Haslet. She died soon thereafter, and he married Mary Miller Loockerman, daughter of the Rev. John Miller and widow of Vincent Loockerman.

== American Revolution ==
Patten was commissioned a first lieutenant in Captain John Caldwell's 2nd Company of the 1st Delaware Regiment at the beginning of the American Revolutionary War. He was soon promoted to captain of the 1st Company and in February 1779 and was promoted to the rank of major. He fought in every major battle from the Battle of Long Island until the Battle of Camden, where the Delaware Regiment suffered grievous losses, and he was taken prisoner. Paroled in 1781, after the fighting was over, he is said to have walked home alone in rags from Charleston, South Carolina.

== Political career ==
Patten was elected in 1785 to the State House or House of Assembly, as it was then known, and represented Kent County, during the 1785/86 session. At the same time he was elected to the Continental Congress in 1785 and served there one year. He won a closely contested election to the U.S. House in 1792 and took his seat in the U.S. House on March 4, 1793. However, Henry Latimer, the Federal candidate contested the election, claiming that many ballots were invalid because they were filled out incorrectly. After a lengthy study the Federalist majority in the U.S. House voted on February 14, 1794, to invalidate enough ballots to award the seat to Latimer. A few months later Patten again defeated Latimer, and this time served the whole term, from March 4, 1795, until March 3, 1797. Brought out of political retirement in 1800, Patten was defeated for the U.S. House seat by the incumbent Federalist James A. Bayard.

== Death and legacy ==
Patten died at his home, Tynhead Court, near Dover, and is buried in the Old Presbyterian Cemetery, which is at Dover, on the grounds of the Delaware State Museum. He had a home on the north side of Front Street, between Orange and Tatnall Streets in Wilmington, Delaware, but was always a legal resident of Kent County. He was active in the Philadelphia Society for promoting Agriculture, the Society of the Cincinnati, and the Lyceum of Delaware.

== Almanac ==
Elections were held October 1. Members of the General Assembly took office on October 20 or the following weekday. The State Assemblymen were elected for a one-year term. They chose the Continental Congressmen for a one-year term. U.S. Representatives took office March 4 and have a two-year term.

After 1792 elections were moved to the first Tuesday of October and members of the General Assembly took office on the first Tuesday of January. The State Legislative Council was renamed the State Senate and the State House of Assembly was renamed the State House of Representatives.

Public offices
Office	Type	Location	Party	Began office	Ended office	Notes
State House	Legislature	Dover	non-partisan	October 20, 1785	October 20, 1786	
Continental Congress	Legislature	New York City	non-partisan	November 7, 1785	November 3, 1786	
U.S. Representative	Legislature	Philadelphia	Republican	March 4, 1793	February 14, 1794	(Note: Election successfully contested and seat awarded to Henry Latimer.)
U.S. Representative	Legislature	Philadelphia	Republican	March 4, 1795	March 3, 1797	

United States congressional service
Dates	Congress	Chamber	Majority	President	Committees	Class/District
1793–1795	3rd	U.S. House	Anti-Administration	George Washington		at-large
1795–1797	4th	U.S. House	Republican	George Washington		at-large

Election results
Year	Office	Subject	Party	votes	%	Opponent	Party	votes	%
1792	U.S. Representative	John Patten	Republican	2,273	50%	Henry Latimer	Federalist	2,243	50%
1794	U.S. Representative	John Patten	Republican	2,409	51%	Henry Latimer	Federalist	2,285	49%
1800	U.S. Representative	John Patten	Republican	2,340	47%	James A. Bayard Sr.	Federalist	2,674	53%

== Sources ==
- Martin, Roger A. (2003). Delawareans in Congress: The House of Representatives, Vol. One 1789-1900. Newark: Roger A. Martin. ISBN 0-924117-26-5.
- Martin, Roger A. (1995). Memoirs of the Senate. Newark: Roger A. Martin.
- Munroe, John A. (2004). The Philadelawareans. Newark: University of Delaware Press. ISBN 0-87413-872-8.
- Munroe, John A. (1954). Federalist Delaware 1775-1815. New Brunswick: Rutgers University.
- Ward, Christopher (1941). The Delaware Continentals. Wilmington, DE: Historical Society of Delaware. ISBN 0-924117-21-4.
- Wilson, W. Emerson (1969). Forgotten Heroes of Delaware. Cambridge, Massachusetts: Deltos Publishing Company.

== Images ==
- Martin, Roger A. (2003). Delawareans in Congress: The House of Representatives, Vol. One 1789-1900. Newark: Roger A. Martin. ISBN 0-924117-26-5. Portrait courtesy of the Delaware Public Archives.

== Places with more information ==
- Delaware Historical Society; website; 505 North Market Street, Wilmington, Delaware 19801; (302) 655-7161.
- University of Delaware; Library website; 181 South College Avenue, Newark, Delaware 19717; (302) 831-2965.
- Historical Society of Pennsylvania website 1300 Locust St. Philadelphia, Pennsylvania (215) 732–6200.

U.S. House of Representatives
Preceded by John Vining	Member of the U.S. House of Representatives from Delaware's at-large congressional district March 4, 1793 – February 14, 1794	Succeeded by Henry Latimer
Preceded by Henry Latimer	Member of the U.S. House of Representatives from Delaware's at-large congressional district March 4, 1795 – March 3, 1797	Succeeded by James A. Bayard Sr.
