= James A. Bayard Sr. =

American lawyer and politician

James Asheton Bayard Sr.
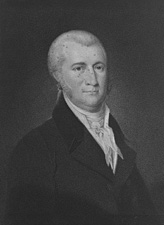

United States Senator from Delaware
- In office November 13, 1804 – March 3, 1813
- Preceded by: William H. Wells
- Succeeded by: William H. Wells

Member of the U.S. House of Representatives from Delaware's at-large district
- In office March 4, 1797 – March 3, 1803
- Preceded by: John Patten
- Succeeded by: Caesar A. Rodney

Personal details
- Born: James Asheton Bayard; July 28, 1767 Philadelphia, Pennsylvania
- Died: August 6, 1815 (aged 48) Wilmington, Delaware, U.S.
- Party: Federalist
- Spouse: Ann (Nancy) Bassett
- Children: 6, including Richard and James
- Parent(s): James Asheton Bayard; Ann Hodge
- Education: Princeton University
- Profession: Lawyer
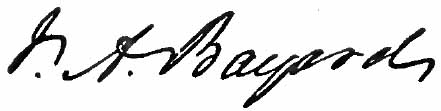
- Signature

James Asheton Bayard Sr. (July 28, 1767 – August 6, 1815) was an American lawyer and politician from Wilmington, Delaware. He was a member of the Federalist Party, who served as U.S. Representative from Delaware and U.S. Senator from Delaware.

== Early life and family ==
Coat of Arms of James A. Bayard

Bayard was born in Philadelphia, Pennsylvania, son of Dr. James Asheton Bayard and Ann Hodge. The Bayards descended from a sister of Dutch Director-General Petrus Stuyvesant and came to Bohemia Manor, Cecil County, Maryland in 1698. Bayard was also of French Huguenot and English ancestry as well. Upon the premature death of his parents, the younger James went to live with his uncle, Colonel John Bubenheim Bayard, in Philadelphia. He graduated from Princeton College in 1784, studied law under General Joseph Reed and Jared Ingersoll, was admitted to the Delaware Bar in 1787, and began a practice in Wilmington, Delaware. Bayard married February 11, 1795, Ann or Nancy Bassett, the daughter of wealthy Delaware lawyer and U.S. Senator Richard Bassett. They had six children, Richard, Caroline, James Jr., Edward, Mary, and Henry M. and lived on the southwest corner of 3rd and French Street in Wilmington, where they owned slaves.

== U.S. House of Representatives ==
Bayard was first elected to the U.S. House of Representatives in 1796, and served there for three terms, from March 4, 1797, until March 3, 1803. While in the U.S. House, "he was distinguished as an orator and constitutional lawyer and became a leader of the party in the house." He especially distinguished himself as one of the impeachment managers appointed in 1798 in the impeachment proceedings against William Blount, a U.S. Senator from Tennessee. Blount was accused of inciting the Creeks and Cherokees to help the British take New Orleans from the Spanish. While the U.S. House impeached him, under Bayard's leadership, the United States Senate dropped the charges in 1799 on the grounds that no further action could be taken beyond his dismissal. This set an important precedent for the future with regard to the limitations on actions which could be taken by U.S. Congress against its members and former members.

Bayard also played an important part in the U.S. presidential election of 1800. With the vote tied in the Electoral College, it was a group of Federalists led by Bayard who broke the deadlock by agreeing to allow the election of Thomas Jefferson by the House of Representatives. When it seemed the Federalists were about to vote for Aaron Burr, Bayard is believed to have followed the advice of Alexander Hamilton and persuaded his Federalist colleagues to abstain from voting. It was also believed he struck a deal with the incoming Jefferson, to refrain from the wholesale removal of Federalists from appointed positions. The young Bayard enlisted Representative Samuel Smith to negotiate with Jefferson on Federalist control of the Philadelphia and Wilmington custom offices. Jefferson subsequently permitted the Federalist officeholders to retain their posts.

Just before John Adams left office as U.S. president he used the provisions of the Judiciary Act of 1801 to make many "midnight" judicial appointments. Among those was Bayard's father-in-law, Richard Bassett. Resigning as Governor of Delaware, Bassett accepted an appointment as a federal judge but soon was out of work when Jefferson had the act repealed. Bayard himself declined an appointment as Minister to France offered by President John Adams in 1801.

So effective was Bayard in opposing Jefferson's administration that an all-out effort was made by the Democratic-Republicans to defeat him in his attempt at a fourth term in 1802. Caesar Augustus Rodney, nephew of the Revolutionary President of Delaware Caesar Rodney, defeated Bayard by 15 votes. However, two years later, in 1804, the result was reversed with Bayard besting Rodney. In the best Delaware tradition, the two remained friends throughout their electoral rivalry.

== U.S. Senate and Peace Commissioner ==
Although re-elected to the U.S. House in 1804, Bayard never returned there, because before the term began, on November 13, 1804, he was elected by the Delaware General Assembly as U.S. Senator, filling the vacancy caused by the resignation of William H. Wells. He began a term of his own the following March 1805, was reelected six years later in 1810, and served in the Senate until his resignation on March 3, 1813.

By his admission, it mattered little who represented Delaware, given the smallness of the state; if the two senators and one representative happened to be all Federalists, all the better, since the party was in a considerable minority by the decade of the 1800s. Like most of his party, Bayard opposed "Mr. Madison's War" as the War of 1812 was sometimes scornfully called, but like the Democratic-Republicans, he was outraged at the British actions on the high seas and recognized the need for action. As the possibility of war became more likely, he urged caution, thinking of the lack of preparedness of the army and navy and especially of the vulnerability of coastal Delaware. On June 17, 1812, he was one of 13 senators to vote against declaring war on Britain. However, once the war began he and all Delaware Federalists wholeheartedly supported the war effort, avoiding the suspicion of treason earned by Federalists in New England.

Because of that support, he was the only Federalist appointed as one of the peace commissioners who eventually negotiated the Treaty of Ghent. Resigning his Senate seat, he went to Europe and played a major role in the negotiations that ended the War of 1812 when the treaty was signed in December 1814. John Quincy Adams, head of the American negotiating team, praised Bayard:

Of the five members of the American mission, the Chevalier [Bayard] has the most perfect control of his temper, the most deliberate coolness; and it is the more meritorious because it is real self-command. His feelings are as quick and his spirits as high as those of any one among us, but he certainly has them more under government.

Subsequently, President James Madison offered him an appointment as Minister to Russia, but Bayard declined, believing a Federalist could hardly represent a Democratic-Republican administration.

Bayard was elected a member of the American Antiquarian Society in July 1815. His disposition on membership is unknown, as no known correspondence confirms or denies his interest, and his death was only a few weeks after his election, and a few days after his return from Europe.

== Death and legacy ==
After spending several months in Europe, Bayard returned home in the summer of 1815. During the trip, he developed an inflamed throat and became critically ill. He lived only five days after his return and died at Wilmington. He was originally buried on Bohemia Manor, in Cecil County, Maryland. In 1842 his remains were removed, along with those of his father-in-law, Richard Bassett, and reburied in the Wilmington and Brandywine Cemetery in Wilmington. Bayard was the father of two U.S. Senators, Richard H. Bayard and James A. Bayard Jr., grandfather of another, Thomas F. Bayard Sr. and great-grandfather of another, Thomas F. Bayard Jr.

He was sometimes known as The Chevalier, the Goliath of his Party, and High Priest of the Constitution.

== Almanac ==
Elections were held on the first Tuesday of October. U.S. Representatives took office on March 4 and have a two-year term. The General Assembly chose the U.S. Senators for six years which also began on March 4. In this case, he was initially completing the existing term, the vacancy caused by the resignation of William H. Wells.

Public Offices
Office	Type	Location	Began office	Ended office	notes
U.S. Representative	Legislature	Philadelphia	March 4, 1797	March 3, 1799	
U.S. Representative	Legislature	Philadelphia	March 4, 1799	March 3, 1801	
U.S. Representative	Legislature	Washington	March 4, 1801	March 3, 1803	
U.S. Senator	Legislature	Washington	January 15, 1805	March 3, 1805	
U.S. Senator	Legislature	Washington	March 4, 1805	March 3, 1811	
U.S. Senator	Legislature	Washington	March 4, 1811	March 3, 1813	

United States Congressional service
Dates	Congress	Chamber	Majority	President	Committees	Class/District
1797–1799	5th	U.S. House	Federalist	John Adams		at-large
1799–1801	6th	U.S. House	Federalist	John Adams		at-large
1801–1803	7th	U.S. House	Republican	Thomas Jefferson		at-large
1803–1805	8th	U.S. Senate	Republican	Thomas Jefferson		class 2
1805–1807	9th	U.S. Senate	Republican	Thomas Jefferson		class 2
1807–1809	10th	U.S. Senate	Republican	Thomas Jefferson		class 2
1809–1811	11th	U.S. Senate	Republican	James Madison		class 2
1811–1813	12th	U.S. Senate	Republican	James Madison		class 2

Election results
Year	Office	Subject	Party	Votes	%	Opponent	Party	Votes	%
1796	U.S. Representative	James A. Bayard	Federalist	2,292	56%	William Peery	Republican	1,783	44%
1798	U.S. Representative	James A. Bayard	Federalist	2,792	61%	Archibald Alexander	Republican	2,142	39%
1800	U.S. Representative	James A. Bayard	Federalist	2,674	53%	John Patten	Republican	2,340	47%
1802	U.S. Representative	James A. Bayard	Federalist	3,406	50%	Caesar A. Rodney	Republican	3,421	50%
1804	U.S. Representative	James A. Bayard	Federalist	4,398	52%	Caesar A. Rodney	Republican	4,038	48%

== Places with more information ==
- Delaware Historical Society; website; 505 North Market Street, Wilmington, Delaware 19801; (302) 655–7161
- University of Delaware; Library website; 181 South College Avenue, Newark, Delaware 19717; (302) 831–2965

U.S. House of Representatives
Preceded by John Patten	Member of the U.S. House of Representatives from Delaware's at-large congressional district 1797–1803	Succeeded by Caesar Augustus Rodney
U.S. Senate
Preceded by William H. Wells	U.S. senator (Class 2) from Delaware; 1804–1813	Succeeded by William H. Wells
