= United States House of Representatives elections in Delaware =

This table shows the results of general elections for the United States House of Representatives from Delaware, beginning in 1788 when the United States Constitution of 1787 went into effect. (Note: Write-in candidates are not listed or included in calculations here unless they received at least 1% of the vote in an election.)

== List of elections ==
Date	Cong.	Seat	Election type	Winner(s)	Party	Votes	%	Opponent(s)	Party	Votes	%	Ref.
Jan 7, 1789	1st	At-large	general	John Vining	Pro-Administration	898	43.6%	Rhoads Shankland	Anti-Administration	491	23.8%	
Jan 7, 1789	1st	At-large	general	John Vining	Pro-Administration	898	43.6%	Gunning Bedford Jr.	Pro-Administration	308	15.0%	
Jan 7, 1789	1st	At-large	general	John Vining	Pro-Administration	898	43.6%	Joshua Clayton	Pro-Administration	272	13.2%	
Jan 7, 1789	1st	At-large	general	John Vining	Pro-Administration	898	43.6%	Allan McLane	Pro-Administration	90	4.4%	
Nov 8, 1790	2nd	At-large	general	John Vining	Pro-Administration	252	50.3%	Joshua Clayton	Pro-Administration	145	28.9%	
Nov 8, 1790	2nd	At-large	general	John Vining	Pro-Administration	252	50.3%	Thomas Duff		104	20.8%	
Oct 2, 1792	3rd	At-large	general	John Patten	Anti-Administration	2,273	38.8%	Henry Latimer	Pro-Administration	2,243	38.3%	
Oct 2, 1792	3rd	At-large	general	John Patten	Anti-Administration	2,273	38.8%	Francis Many		685	11.7%	
Oct 2, 1792	3rd	At-large	general	John Patten	Anti-Administration	2,273	38.8%	Edward Roche	Anti-Administration	465	7.9%	
Oct 2, 1792	3rd	At-large	general	John Patten	Anti-Administration	2,273	38.8%	Andrew Barrett	Pro-Administration	195	3.3%	
Oct 2, 1792	3rd	At-large	recount (Note: Totals approved by the U.S. House of Representatives on February 14, 1794.)	Henry Latimer	Pro-Administration	2,238	50.4%	John Patten	Anti-Administration	2,205	49.6%	
Oct 4, 1794	4th	At-large	general	John Patten	Democratic-Republican	2,409	51.3%	Henry Latimer	Federalist	2,285	48.7%	
Oct 4, 1796	5th	At-large	general	James A. Bayard	Federalist	2,292	56.3%	William Perry	Democratic-Republican	1,779	43.7%	
Oct 2, 1798	6th	At-large	general	James A. Bayard	Federalist	2,792	61.2%	Archibald Alexander	Democratic-Republican	1,772	38.8%	
Oct 7, 1800	7th	At-large	general	James A. Bayard	Federalist	2,674	53.3%	John Patten	Democratic-Republican	2,340	46.7%	
Oct 5, 1802	8th	At-large	general	Caesar Augustus Rodney	Democratic-Republican	3,421	50.1%	James A. Bayard	Federalist	3,406	49.9%	
Oct 2, 1804	9th	At-large	general	James A. Bayard	Federalist	4,398	52.1%	Caesar Augustus Rodney	Democratic-Republican	4,040	47.9%	
Oct 1, 1805	9th	At-large	special (Note: Vice James A. Bayard, elevated.)	James M. Broom	Federalist	3,011	52.7%	David Hall	Democratic-Republican	2,682	46.9%	
Oct 1, 1805	9th	At-large	special	James M. Broom	Federalist	3,011	52.7%	Isaac H. Starr	Democratic-Republican	24	0.4%	
Oct 7, 1806	10th	At-large	general	James M. Broom	Federalist	2,353	60.5%	Thomas Fitzgerald	Democratic-Republican	830	21.3%	
Oct 7, 1806	10th	At-large	general	James M. Broom	Federalist	2,353	60.5%	Joseph Haslet	Democratic-Republican	382	9.8%	
Oct 7, 1806	10th	At-large	general	James M. Broom	Federalist	2,353	60.5%	Thomas Montgomery	Democratic-Republican	323	8.3%	
Oct 6, 1807	10th	At-large	special (Note: Vice James M. Broom, resigned.)	Nicholas Van Dyke	Federalist	3,294	51.7%	John Dickinson	Democratic-Republican	3,078	48.3%	
Oct 4, 1808	11th	At-large	general	Nicholas Van Dyke	Federalist	3,242	53.3%	Joseph Haslet	Democratic-Republican	2,837	46.7%	
Oct 2, 1810	12th	At-large	general	Henry M. Ridgely	Federalist	3,634	50.1%	Richard C. Dale	Democratic-Republican	3,617	49.9%	
Oct 6, 1812	13th	At-large (2 seats)	general	Henry M. Ridgely	Federalist	4,193	28.3%	David Hall	Democratic-Republican	3,221	21.8%	
Oct 6, 1812	13th	At-large (2 seats)	general	Thomas Cooper	Federalist	4,183	28.3%	Richard C. Dale	Democratic-Republican	3,210	21.7%	
Oct 4, 1814	14th	At-large (2 seats)	general	Thomas Clayton	Federalist	3,964	30.5%	Willard Hall	Democratic-Republican	2,547	19.6%	
Oct 4, 1814	14th	At-large (2 seats)	general	Thomas Cooper	Federalist	3,960	30.4%	George Read Jr.	Democratic-Republican	2,545	19.6%	
Oct 7, 1816	15th	At-large (2 seats)	general	Louis McLane	Federalist	3,580	24.1%	Caesar Augustus Rodney	Democratic-Republican	3,476	23.4%	
Oct 7, 1816	15th	At-large (2 seats)	general	Louis McLane	Federalist	3,580	24.1%	Caleb Rodney	Federalist	3,410	22.9%	
Oct 7, 1816	15th	At-large (2 seats)	general	Willard Hall	Democratic-Republican	3,524	23.7%	Thomas Clayton	Federalist	486	3.3%	
Oct 7, 1816	15th	At-large (2 seats)	general	Willard Hall	Democratic-Republican	3,524	23.7%	Thomas Cooper	Federalist	390	2.6%	
Oct 5, 1818	16th	At-large (2 seats)	general	Louis McLane	Federalist	3,098	26.2%	Thomas Clayton	Federalist	2,902	24.6%	
Oct 5, 1818	16th	At-large (2 seats)	general	Willard Hall	Democratic-Republican	3,007	25.4%	George Read Jr.	Democratic-Republican	2,810	23.8%	
Oct 3, 1820	17th	At-large (2 seats)	general	Caesar Augustus Rodney	Democratic-Republican	4,029	26.9%	Willard Hall	Democratic-Republican	3,525	23.5%	
Oct 3, 1820	17th	At-large (2 seats)	general	Louis McLane	Federalist	3,918	26.2%	John Mitchell	Federalist	3,500	23.4%	
Oct 1, 1822	17th	At-large	special (Note: Vice Caesar Augustus Rodney, elevated.)	Daniel Rodney	Federalist	3,884	51.5%	James Derickson	Democratic-Republican	3,653	48.5%	
Oct 1, 1822	18th	At-large	general	Louis McLane	Federalist	4,110	54.3%	Arnold Naudain	Democratic-Republican	3,466	45.7%	
Oct 5, 1824	19th	At-large	general	Louis McLane	Federalist	3,387	51.7%	Arnold Naudain	Democratic-Republican	3,163	48.3%	
Oct 3, 1826	20th	At-large	general	Louis McLane	Federalist	4,630	54.1%	Arnold Naudain	Democratic-Republican	3,931	45.9%	
Oct 2, 1827	20th	At-large	special (Note: Vice Louis McLane, elevated.)	Kensey Johns Jr.	National Republican	4,148	52.5%	James A. Bayard Jr.	Jacksonian Democratic	3,753	47.5%	
Oct 7, 1828	21st	At-large	general	Kensey Johns Jr.	National Republican	4,769	52.3%	James A. Bayard Jr.	Jacksonian Democratic	4,347	47.7%	
Nov 13, 1830	22nd	At-large	general	John J. Milligan	National Republican	4,267	52.7%	Henry M. Ridgely	Jacksonian Democratic	3,833	47.3%	
Nov 13, 1832	23rd	At-large	general	John J. Milligan	National Republican	4,257	50.7%	Martin W. Bates	Jacksonian Democratic	4,142	49.3%	
Nov 11, 1834	24th	At-large	general	John J. Milligan	Whig	4,779	50.8%	James A. Bayard Jr.	Democratic	4,626	49.2%	
Nov 8, 1836	25th	At-large	general	John J. Milligan	Whig	4,705	52.6%	Martin W. Bates	Democratic	4,247	47.4%	
Nov 13, 1838	26th	At-large	general	Thomas Robinson Jr.	Democratic	4,437	50.3%	John J. Milligan	Whig	4,379	49.7%	
Nov 10, 1840	27th	At-large	general	George B. Rodney	Whig	5,896	54.2%	Thomas Robinson Jr.	Democratic	4,974	45.8%	
Nov 8, 1842	28th	At-large	general	George B. Rodney	Whig	5,465	50.04%	William Hemphill Jones	Democratic	5,456	49.96%	
Nov 12, 1844	29th	At-large	general	John W. Houston	Whig	6,229	50.8%	George R. Riddle	Democratic	6,023	49.2%	
Nov 10, 1846	30th	At-large	general	John W. Houston	Whig	6,254	51.0%	John D. Delworth	Democratic	6,007	49.0%	
Nov 6, 1848	31st	At-large	general	John W. Houston	Whig	6,369	51.4%	William G. Whiteley	Democratic	6,026	48.6%	
Nov 12, 1850	32nd	At-large	general	George R. Riddle	Democratic	6,055	49.2%	George B. Rodney	Whig	5,936	48.2%	
Nov 12, 1850	32nd	At-large	general	George R. Riddle	Democratic	6,055	49.2%	Francis D. Wait	Temperance	313	2.5%	
Nov 8, 1852	33rd	At-large	general	George R. Riddle	Democratic	6,692	50.2%	John W. Houston	Whig	6,630	49.8%	
Nov 14, 1854	34th	At-large	general	Elisha D. Cullen	American	6,820	51.8%	George R. Riddle	Democratic	6,334	48.2%	
Nov 4, 1856	35th	At-large	general	William G. Whiteley	Democratic	8,111	56.1%	Elisha D. Cullen	American	6,360	43.9%	
Nov 2, 1858	36th	At-large	general	William G. Whiteley	Democratic	7,868	51.4%	William H. Morris	People's	7,452	48.6%	
Nov 6, 1860	37th	At-large	general	George P. Fisher	People's	7,732	48.4%	Benjamin T. Biggs	Democratic	7,485	46.8%	
Nov 6, 1860	37th	At-large	general	George P. Fisher	People's	7,732	48.4%	Elias Reed	Democratic	761	4.8%	
Nov 1, 1862	38th	At-large	general	William Temple	Democratic	8,051	50.1%	George P. Fisher	Union	8,014	49.9%	
Nov 19, 1863	38th	At-large	special (Note: Vice William Temple, deceased.)	Nathaniel B. Smithers	Union	8,215	99.8%	Charles Brown	Copperhead	15	0.2%	
Nov 8, 1864	39th	At-large	general	John A. Nicholson	Democratic	8,762	51.5%	Nathaniel B. Smithers	Union	8,253	48.5%	
Nov 6, 1866	40th	At-large	general	John A. Nicholson	Democratic	9,933	53.7%	John L. McKim	Republican	8,553	46.3%	
Nov 3, 1868	41st	At-large	general	Benjamin T. Biggs	Democratic	10,961	58.9%	Alfred I. Torbet	Republican	7,636	41.1%	
Nov 8, 1870	42nd	At-large	general	Benjamin T. Biggs	Democratic	12,434	55.4%	Joshua T. Heald	Republican	10,001	44.6%	
Nov 5, 1872	43rd	At-large	general	James R. Lofland	Republican	11,378	50.8%	Eustis Wright	Democratic	11,023	49.2%	
Nov 3, 1874	44th	At-large	general	James Williams	Democratic	12,602	53.3%	James R. Lofland	Republican	11,024	46.7%	
Nov 7, 1876	45th	At-large	general	James Williams	Democratic	13,169	54.9%	Levi C. Bird	Republican	10,592	44.1%	
Nov 7, 1876	45th	At-large	general	James Williams	Democratic	13,169	54.9%	Charles Moore	Temperance	236	1.0%	
Nov 5, 1878	46th	At-large	general	Edward L. Martin	Democratic	10,576	78.1%	John G. Jackson	Greenback	2,966	21.9%	
Nov 2, 1880	47th	At-large	general	Edward L. Martin	Democratic	14,966	50.8%	John W. Houston	Republican	14,336	48.7%	
Nov 2, 1880	47th	At-large	general	Edward L. Martin	Democratic	14,966	50.8%	John G. Jackson	Greenback	132	0.4%	
Nov 7, 1882	48th	At-large	general	Charles B. Lore	Democratic	16,563	53.1%	Washington Hastings	Republican	14,640	46.9%	
Nov 4, 1884	49th	At-large	general	Charles B. Lore	Democratic	17,054	57.0%	Anthony Higgins	Republican	12,878	43.0%	
Nov 2, 1886	50th	At-large	general	John B. Penington	Democratic	13,837	62.2%	Richard W. Cooper	Temperance Reform	8,392	37.8%	
Nov 6, 1888	51st	At-large	general	John B. Penington	Democratic	16,396	55.2%	Charles H. Treat	Republican	12,935	43.5%	
Nov 6, 1888	51st	At-large	general	John B. Penington	Democratic	16,396	55.2%	Charles H. Register	Prohibition	387	1.3%	
Nov 4, 1890	52nd	At-large	general	John W. Causey	Democratic	17,848	50.6%	Henry P. Cannon	Republican	17,180	48.7%	
Nov 4, 1890	52nd	At-large	general	John W. Causey	Democratic	17,848	50.6%	Daniel M. Green	Prohibition	257	0.7%	
Nov 8, 1892	53rd	At-large	general	John W. Causey	Democratic	18,554	50.0%	Jonathan S. Willis	Republican	18,080	48.7%	
Nov 8, 1892	53rd	At-large	general	John W. Causey	Democratic	18,554	50.0%	Lewis M. Price	Prohibition	509	1.4%	
Nov 6, 1894	54th	At-large	general	Jonathan S. Willis	Republican	19,789	50.8%	Samuel Bancroft	Democratic	18,492	47.5%	
Nov 6, 1894	54th	At-large	general	Jonathan S. Willis	Republican	19,789	50.8%	W. W. Bullock	Prohibition	584	1.5%	
Nov 6, 1894	54th	At-large	general	Jonathan S. Willis	Republican	19,789	50.8%	John P. Donahue	Independent Democratic	67	0.2%	
Nov 3, 1896	55th	At-large	general	L. Irving Handy	Democratic	15,407	44.0%	Jonathan S. Willis	Union Republican	11,159	31.9%	
Nov 3, 1896	55th	At-large	general	L. Irving Handy	Democratic	15,407	44.0%	Robert G. Houston	Republican	7,123	20.4%	
Nov 3, 1896	55th	At-large	general	L. Irving Handy	Democratic	15,407	44.0%	Thomas F. Bayard Jr.	Honest Money Democratic	844	2.4%	
Nov 3, 1896	55th	At-large	general	L. Irving Handy	Democratic	15,407	44.0%	William Faries	Prohibition	462	1.3%	
Nov 8, 1898	56th	At-large	general	John H. Hoffecker	Republican	17,566	53.1%	L. Irving Handy	Democratic	15,053	45.5%	
Nov 8, 1898	56th	At-large	general	John H. Hoffecker	Republican	17,566	53.1%	Lewis M. Brosius	Prohibition	454	1.4%	
Nov 6, 1900	56th	At-large	special (Note: Vice John H. Hoffecker, deceased.)	Walter O. Hoffecker	Republican	22,389	53.5%	Edward Fowler	Democratic	19,012	45.4%	
Nov 6, 1900	56th	At-large	special	Walter O. Hoffecker	Republican	22,389	53.5%	Lewis M. Price	Prohibition	394	0.9%	
Nov 6, 1900	56th	At-large	special	Walter O. Hoffecker	Republican	22,389	53.5%	John P. Mettler	Social Democratic	55	0.1%	
Nov 6, 1900	57th	At-large	general	L. Heisler Ball	Republican	22,353	53.1%	Alexander M. Daly	Democratic	19,157	45.5%	
Nov 6, 1900	57th	At-large	general	L. Heisler Ball	Republican	22,353	53.1%	Lewis M. Brosius	Prohibition	548	1.3%	
Nov 6, 1900	57th	At-large	general	L. Heisler Ball	Republican	22,353	53.1%	Nathan Shtofman	Social Democratic	54	0.1%	
Nov 4, 1902	58th	At-large	general	Henry A. Houston	Democratic	16,396	42.9%	William A. Byrne	Union Republican	12,998	34.0%	
Nov 4, 1902	58th	At-large	general	Henry A. Houston	Democratic	16,396	42.9%	L. Heisler Ball	Republican	8,028	21.0%	
Nov 4, 1902	58th	At-large	general	Henry A. Houston	Democratic	16,396	42.9%	George W. Todd	Prohibition	569	1.5%	
Nov 4, 1902	58th	At-large	general	Henry A. Houston	Democratic	16,396	42.9%	James A. Ward	Labor	216	0.6%	
Nov 8, 1904	59th	At-large	general	Hiram R. Burton	Republican	23,512	53.7%	Edward D. Hearne	Democratic	19,552	44.6%	
Nov 8, 1904	59th	At-large	general	Hiram R. Burton	Republican	23,512	53.7%	William Faries	Prohibition	607	1.4%	
Nov 8, 1904	59th	At-large	general	Hiram R. Burton	Republican	23,512	53.7%	John P. Edwards	Socialist	135	0.3%	
Nov 6, 1906	60th	At-large	general	Hiram R. Burton	Republican	20,210	52.8%	David T. Marvel	Democratic	17,118	44.8%	
Nov 6, 1906	60th	At-large	general	Hiram R. Burton	Republican	20,210	52.8%	Alfred Smith	Prohibition	767	2.0%	
Nov 6, 1906	60th	At-large	general	Hiram R. Burton	Republican	20,210	52.8%	Frank A. Houck	Socialist	149	0.4%	
Nov 3, 1908	61st	At-large	general	William H. Heald	Republican	24,314	50.7%	L. Irving Handy	Democratic	22,515	46.9%	
Nov 3, 1908	61st	At-large	general	William H. Heald	Republican	24,314	50.7%	William E. Hawkins	Prohibition	921	1.9%	
Nov 3, 1908	61st	At-large	general	William H. Heald	Republican	24,314	50.7%	Frank A. Houck	Socialist	228	0.5%	
Nov 3, 1908	61st	At-large	general	William H. Heald	Republican	24,314	50.7%	Elliott Cresson	Independence League	10	<0.1%	
Nov 8, 1910	62nd	At-large	general	William H. Heald	Republican	22,410	50.9%	Robert C. White	Democratic	20,281	46.1%	
Nov 8, 1910	62nd	At-large	general	William H. Heald	Republican	22,410	50.9%	Lewis M. Brosius	Prohibition	763	1.7%	
Nov 8, 1910	62nd	At-large	general	William H. Heald	Republican	22,410	50.9%	Frank A. Houck	Socialist	559	1.3%	
Nov 5, 1912	63rd	At-large	general	Franklin Brockson	Democratic	22,485	46.2%	George Hall	Republican	16,740	34.4%	
Nov 5, 1912	63rd	At-large	general	Franklin Brockson	Democratic	22,485	46.2%	Hiram R. Burton	National Progressive	5,497	11.3%	
Nov 5, 1912	63rd	At-large	general	Franklin Brockson	Democratic	22,485	46.2%	Louis A. Drexler	Progressive	2,825	5.8%	
Nov 5, 1912	63rd	At-large	general	Franklin Brockson	Democratic	22,485	46.2%	John H. Kelly	Prohibition	597	1.2%	
Nov 5, 1912	63rd	At-large	general	Franklin Brockson	Democratic	22,485	46.2%	Edward Norton	Socialist	563	1.2%	
Nov 3, 1914	64th	At-large	general	Thomas W. Miller	Republican	22,922	50.1%	Franklin Brockson	Democratic	20,681	45.2%	
Nov 3, 1914	64th	At-large	general	Thomas W. Miller	Republican	22,922	50.1%	James H. Anderson	Prohibition/Progressive	1,653	3.6%	
Nov 3, 1914	64th	At-large	general	Thomas W. Miller	Republican	22,922	50.1%	William H. Connor	Socialist	463	1.0%	
Nov 7, 1916	65th	At-large	general	Albert F. Polk	Democratic	24,395	47.6%	Thomas W. Miller	Republican	24,202	47.3%	
Nov 7, 1916	65th	At-large	general	Albert F. Polk	Democratic	24,395	47.6%	Edward G. Bradford	Progressive	2,130	4.2%	
Nov 7, 1916	65th	At-large	general	Albert F. Polk	Democratic	24,395	47.6%	Frederick K. Miller	Socialist	484	0.9%	
Nov 5, 1918	66th	At-large	general	Caleb R. Layton	Republican	21,226	51.4%	Albert F. Polk	Democratic	19,652	47.6%	
Nov 5, 1918	66th	At-large	general	Caleb R. Layton	Republican	21,226	51.4%	William H. Crawford	Socialist	420	1.0%	
Nov 2, 1920	67th	At-large	general	Caleb R. Layton	Republican	52,145	55.7%	James R. Clements	Democratic	40,206	43.0%	
Nov 2, 1920	67th	At-large	general	Caleb R. Layton	Republican	52,145	55.7%	Robert A. Walker	Socialist	1,063	1.1%	
Nov 2, 1920	67th	At-large	general	Caleb R. Layton	Republican	52,145	55.7%	Howard T. Ennis	Independent	196	0.2%	
Nov 7, 1922	68th	At-large	general	William H. Boyce	Democratic	39,126	53.9%	Caleb R. Layton	Republican	32,577	44.9%	
Nov 7, 1922	68th	At-large	general	William H. Boyce	Democratic	39,126	53.9%	Frank A. Houck	Forward	908	1.3%	
Nov 4, 1924	69th	At-large	general	Robert G. Houston	Republican	51,536	58.6%	William H. Boyce	Democratic	35,943	40.8%	
Nov 4, 1924	69th	At-large	general	Robert G. Houston	Republican	51,536	58.6%	Florence Garvin	Prohibition	519	0.6%	
Nov 2, 1926	70th	At-large	general	Robert G. Houston	Republican	38,919	56.9%	Merrill H. Tilghman	Democratic	29,424	43.1%	
Nov 6, 1928	71st	At-large	general	Robert G. Houston	Republican	66,361	63.6%	John M. Richardson	Democratic	38,045	36.4%	
Nov 4, 1930	72nd	At-large	general	Robert G. Houston	Republican	48,493	55.7%	John P. Le Fevre	Democratic	38,391	44.1%	
Nov 4, 1930	72nd	At-large	general	Robert G. Houston	Republican	48,493	55.7%	Arnold Williams	Communist	127	0.1%	
Nov 8, 1932	73rd	At-large	general	Wilbur L. Adams	Democratic	51,698	46.1%	Reuben Satterthwaite Jr.	Republican	48,841	43.6%	
Nov 8, 1932	73rd	At-large	general	Wilbur L. Adams	Democratic	51,698	46.1%	Francis B. Short	Prohibition	10,560	9.4%	
Nov 8, 1932	73rd	At-large	general	Wilbur L. Adams	Democratic	51,698	46.1%	Edgar G. Shaeffer	Socialist	887	0.8%	
Nov 8, 1932	73rd	At-large	general	Wilbur L. Adams	Democratic	51,698	46.1%	Frank Rhoades	Communist	110	<0.1%	
Nov 6, 1934	74th	At-large	general	J. George Stewart	Republican	52,468	53.1%	John C. Hazzard	Democratic	45,927	46.5%	
Nov 6, 1934	74th	At-large	general	J. George Stewart	Republican	52,468	53.1%	William A. Mayer	Socialist	404	0.4%	
Nov 6, 1934	74th	At-large	general	J. George Stewart	Republican	52,468	53.1%	Joseph P. Daniels	Communist	58	<0.1%	
Nov 3, 1936	75th	At-large	general	William F. Allen	Democratic	65,485	51.7%	J. George Stewart	Republican	55,664	43.9%	
Nov 3, 1936	75th	At-large	general	William F. Allen	Democratic	65,485	51.7%	James A. Ellison	Independent Republican	5,338	4.2%	
Nov 3, 1936	75th	At-large	general	William F. Allen	Democratic	65,485	51.7%	William A. Mayer	Socialist	176	0.1%	
Nov 8, 1938	76th	At-large	general	George S. Williams	Republican	60,661	55.9%	William F. Allen	Democratic	46,989	43.3%	
Nov 8, 1938	76th	At-large	general	George S. Williams	Republican	60,661	55.9%	William J. Highfield	Independent Republican	816	0.8%	
Nov 8, 1938	76th	At-large	general	George S. Williams	Republican	60,661	55.9%	Ralph L. Brown	Prohibition	105	<0.1%	
Nov 5, 1940	77th	At-large	general	Philip A. Traynor	Democratic	68,205	50.6%	George S. Williams	Republican	64,384	47.8%	
Nov 5, 1940	77th	At-large	general	Philip A. Traynor	Democratic	68,205	50.6%	Royden C. Caulk	Liberal Democratic	2,189	1.6%	
Nov 3, 1942	78th	At-large	general	Earle D. Willey	Republican	45,376	53.6%	Philip A. Traynor	Democratic	38,791	45.8%	
Nov 3, 1942	78th	At-large	general	Earle D. Willey	Republican	45,376	53.6%	Charles A. Kirk	Prohibition	559	0.7%	
Nov 7, 1944	79th	At-large	general	Philip A. Traynor	Democratic	63,649	50.3%	Earle D. Willey	Republican	62,378	49.3%	
Nov 7, 1944	79th	At-large	general	Philip A. Traynor	Democratic	63,649	50.3%	Harold H. Vigneulle	Prohibition	413	0.3%	
Nov 5, 1946	80th	At-large	general	J. Caleb Boggs	Republican	63,516	56.4%	Philip A. Traynor	Democratic	49,105	43.6%	
Nov 2, 1948	81st	At-large	general	J. Caleb Boggs	Republican	71,127	50.6%	J. Carl McGuigan	Democratic	68,909	49.0%	
Nov 2, 1948	81st	At-large	general	J. Caleb Boggs	Republican	71,127	50.6%	Edward C. Graham	Prohibition	399	0.3%	
Nov 2, 1948	81st	At-large	general	J. Caleb Boggs	Republican	71,127	50.6%	LeRoy B. Jones	Socialist	100	<0.1%	
Nov 7, 1950	82nd	At-large	general	J. Caleb Boggs	Republican	73,313	56.7%	Henry M. Winchester	Republican	56,091	43.3%	
Nov 4, 1952	83rd	At-large	general	Herbert Warburton	Republican	88,285	51.9%	Joseph S. Scannell	Democratic	81,730	48.1%	
Nov 2, 1954	84th	At-large	general	Harris McDowell	Democratic	79,201	54.9%	Lillian I. Martin	Republican	65,035	45.1%	
Nov 6, 1956	85th	At-large	general	Harry G. Haskell Jr.	Republican	91,538	52.0%	Harris McDowell	Democratic	84,644	48.0%	
Nov 4, 1958	86th	At-large	general	Harris McDowell	Democratic	76,797	50.2%	Harry G. Haskell Jr.	Republican	76,099	49.8%	
Nov 8, 1960	87th	At-large	general	Harris McDowell	Democratic	98,227	50.5%	James T. McKinstry	Republican	96,337	49.5%	
Nov 6, 1962	88th	At-large	general	Harris McDowell	Democratic	81,166	52.9%	Wilmer F. Williams	Republican	71,934	46.9%	
Nov 6, 1962	88th	At-large	general	Harris McDowell	Democratic	81,166	52.9%	Joseph B. Hollon	Socialist Labor	256	0.2%	
Nov 3, 1964	89th	At-large	general	Harris McDowell	Democratic	112,361	56.6%	James H. Snowden	Republican	86,254	43.4%	
Nov 3, 1964	89th	At-large	general	Harris McDowell	Democratic	112,361	56.6%	George LaForest	Socialist Labor	76	<0.1%	
Nov 8, 1966	90th	At-large	general	William Roth	Republican	90,961	55.8%	Harris McDowell	Democratic	72,142	44.2%	
Nov 5, 1968	91st	At-large	general	William Roth	Republican	117,827	58.7%	Harris McDowell	Democratic	82,993	41.3%	
Nov 3, 1970	92nd	At-large	general	Pete du Pont	Republican	86,125	53.7%	John D. Daniello	Democratic	71,429	44.6%	
Nov 3, 1970	92nd	At-large	general	Pete du Pont	Republican	86,125	53.7%	Walter Hoey	American	2,759	1.7%	
Nov 7, 1972	93rd	At-large	general	Pete du Pont	Republican	141,237	62.5%	Norma Handloff	Democratic	83,230	36.9%	
Nov 7, 1972	93rd	At-large	general	Pete du Pont	Republican	141,237	62.5%	Robert G. LoPresti	American	1,120	0.5%	
Nov 7, 1972	93rd	At-large	general	Pete du Pont	Republican	141,237	62.5%	Rachel L. Dickerson	Prohibition	264	0.1%	
Nov 5, 1974	94th	At-large	general	Pete du Pont	Republican	93,826	58.5%	James R. Soles	Democratic	63,490	39.6%	
Nov 5, 1974	94th	At-large	general	Pete du Pont	Republican	93,826	58.5%	Donald G. Gies	American	1,250	0.8%	
Nov 5, 1974	94th	At-large	general	Pete du Pont	Republican	93,826	58.5%	John Trager	Public Congress	1,241	0.8%	
Nov 5, 1974	94th	At-large	general	Pete du Pont	Republican	93,826	58.5%	George C. Brown	Prohibition	370	0.2%	
Nov 5, 1974	94th	At-large	general	Pete du Pont	Republican	93,826	58.5%	Melvin Dillard	U.S. Labor	151	<0.1%	
Nov 2, 1976	95th	At-large	general	Thomas B. Evans Jr.	Republican	110,677	51.5%	Samuel L. Shipley	Democratic	102,431	47.7%	
Nov 2, 1976	95th	At-large	general	Thomas B. Evans Jr.	Republican	110,677	51.5%	Robert G. LoPresti	American	840	0.4%	
Nov 2, 1976	95th	At-large	general	Thomas B. Evans Jr.	Republican	110,677	51.5%	Joseph B. Hollon	Socialist Labor	347	0.2%	
Nov 2, 1976	95th	At-large	general	Thomas B. Evans Jr.	Republican	110,677	51.5%	Raymond R. Green	Prohibition	346	0.2%	
Nov 2, 1976	95th	At-large	general	Thomas B. Evans Jr.	Republican	110,677	51.5%	Phillip Valenti	U.S. Labor	158	<0.1%	
Nov 7, 1978	96th	At-large	general	Thomas B. Evans Jr.	Republican	91,689	58.2%	Gary E. Hindes	Democratic	64,863	41.2%	
Nov 7, 1978	96th	At-large	general	Thomas B. Evans Jr.	Republican	91,689	58.2%	James E. Hicks	American	1,014	0.6%	
Nov 4, 1980	97th	At-large	general	Thomas B. Evans Jr.	Republican	133,842	61.8%	Robert L. Maxwell	Democratic	81,227	37.5%	
Nov 4, 1980	97th	At-large	general	Thomas B. Evans Jr.	Republican	133,842	61.8%	Lawrence D. Sullivan	Libertarian	1,506	0.7%	
Nov 2, 1982	98th	At-large	general	Tom Carper	Democratic	98,533	52.4%	Thomas B. Evans Jr.	Republican	87,153	46.3%	
Nov 2, 1982	98th	At-large	general	Tom Carper	Democratic	98,533	52.4%	Mary D. Gies	American	1,109	0.6%	
Nov 2, 1982	98th	At-large	general	Tom Carper	Democratic	98,533	52.4%	Richard A. Cohen	Libertarian	711	0.4%	
Nov 2, 1982	98th	At-large	general	Tom Carper	Democratic	98,533	52.4%	David A. Nuttall	Citizens	558	0.3%	
Nov 6, 1984	99th	At-large	general	Tom Carper	Democratic	142,070	58.5%	Elise du Pont	Republican	100,650	41.4%	
Nov 6, 1984	99th	At-large	general	Tom Carper	Democratic	142,070	58.5%	Vernon L. Etzel	Libertarian	294	0.1%	
Nov 4, 1986	100th	At-large	general	Tom Carper	Democratic	106,351	66.2%	Thomas S. Neuberger	Republican	53,767	33.4%	
Nov 4, 1986	100th	At-large	general	Tom Carper	Democratic	106,351	66.2%	Patrick F. Harrison	American	639	0.4%	
Nov 8, 1988	101st	At-large	general	Tom Carper	Democratic	158,338	67.5%	James P. Krapf	Republican	76,179	32.5%	
Nov 6, 1990	102nd	At-large	general	Tom Carper	Democratic	116,274	65.5%	Ralph O. Williams	Republican	58,037	32.7%	
Nov 6, 1990	102nd	At-large	general	Tom Carper	Democratic	116,274	65.5%	Richard A. Cohen	Libertarian	3,121	1.8%	
Nov 3, 1992	103rd	At-large	general	Mike Castle	Republican	153,037	55.4%	S. B. Woo	Democratic	117,426	42.5%	
Nov 3, 1992	103rd	At-large	general	Mike Castle	Republican	153,037	55.4%	Peggy Schmitt	Libertarian	5,661	2.1%	
Nov 8, 1994	104th	At-large	general	Mike Castle	Republican	137,960	70.7%	Carol Ann DeSantis	Democratic	51,803	26.6%	
Nov 8, 1994	104th	At-large	general	Mike Castle	Republican	137,960	70.7%	Danny Ray Beaver	Libertarian	3,869	2.0%	
Nov 8, 1994	104th	At-large	general	Mike Castle	Republican	137,960	70.7%	Donald M. Hockmuth	A Delaware Party	1,405	0.7%	
Nov 5, 1996	105th	At-large	general	Mike Castle	Republican	185,576	69.5%	Dennis E. Williams	Democratic	73,253	27.5%	
Nov 5, 1996	105th	At-large	general	Mike Castle	Republican	185,576	69.5%	George A. Jurgensen	Libertarian	4,000	1.5%	
Nov 5, 1996	105th	At-large	general	Mike Castle	Republican	185,576	69.5%	Felicia B. Johnson	U.S. Taxpayers	3,009	1.1%	
Nov 5, 1996	105th	At-large	general	Mike Castle	Republican	185,576	69.5%	Robert E. Mattson	Natural Law	987	0.4%	
Nov 3, 1998	106th	At-large	general	Mike Castle	Republican	119,811	66.4%	Dennis E. Williams	Democratic	57,446	31.8%	
Nov 3, 1998	106th	At-large	general	Mike Castle	Republican	119,811	66.4%	James P. Webster	U.S. Taxpayers	2,411	1.3%	
Nov 3, 1998	106th	At-large	general	Mike Castle	Republican	119,811	66.4%	Kim Stanley Bemis	Natural Law	859	0.5%	
Nov 7, 2000	107th	At-large	general	Mike Castle	Republican	211,797	67.6%	Micheal C. Miller	Democratic	96,488	30.8%	
Nov 7, 2000	107th	At-large	general	Mike Castle	Republican	211,797	67.6%	James P. Webster	Constitution	2,490	0.8%	
Nov 7, 2000	107th	At-large	general	Mike Castle	Republican	211,797	67.6%	Brad C. Thomas	Libertarian	2,351	0.8%	
Nov 5, 2002	108th	At-large	general	Mike Castle	Republican	164,605	72.1%	Micheal C. Miller	Democratic	61,011	26.7%	
Nov 5, 2002	108th	At-large	general	Mike Castle	Republican	164,605	72.1%	Brad C. Thomas	Libertarian	2,789	1.2%	
Nov 2, 2004	109th	At-large	general	Mike Castle	Republican	245,808	69.1%	Paul Donnelly	Democratic	105,634	29.7%	
Nov 2, 2004	109th	At-large	general	Mike Castle	Republican	245,808	69.1%	Maurice J. Barros	Independent Party of Delaware	2,334	0.7%	
Nov 2, 2004	109th	At-large	general	Mike Castle	Republican	245,808	69.1%	William E. Morris	Libertarian	2,012	0.6%	
Nov 7, 2006	110th	At-large	general	Mike Castle	Republican	143,897	57.2%	Dennis Spivack	Democratic	97,565	38.8%	
Nov 7, 2006	110th	At-large	general	Mike Castle	Republican	143,897	57.2%	Karen Hartley-Nagle	Independent Party of Delaware	5,769	2.3%	
Nov 7, 2006	110th	At-large	general	Mike Castle	Republican	143,897	57.2%	Michael Berg	Green	4,463	1.8%	
Nov 4, 2008	111th	At-large	general	Mike Castle	Republican	235,437	61.1%	Karen Hartley-Nagle	Democratic	146,434	38.0%	
Nov 4, 2008	111th	At-large	general	Mike Castle	Republican	235,437	61.1%	Mark Anthony Parks	Libertarian	3,586	0.9%	
Nov 2, 2010	112th	At-large	general	John Carney	Democratic	173,543	56.8%	Glen Urquhart	Republican	125,442	41.0%	
Nov 2, 2010	112th	At-large	general	John Carney	Democratic	173,543	56.8%	Earl R. Lofland	Independent Party of Delaware	3,704	1.2%	
Nov 2, 2010	112th	At-large	general	John Carney	Democratic	173,543	56.8%	Brent A. Wangen	Libertarian	1,986	0.6%	
Nov 2, 2010	112th	At-large	general	John Carney	Democratic	173,543	56.8%	Jeffrey Brown	Blue Enigma	961	0.3%	
Nov 6, 2012	113th	At-large	general	John Carney	Democratic	249,933	64.4%	Tom Kovach	Republican	129,757	33.4%	
Nov 6, 2012	113th	At-large	general	John Carney	Democratic	249,933	64.4%	Bernard August	Green	4,273	1.1%	
Nov 6, 2012	113th	At-large	general	John Carney	Democratic	249,933	64.4%	Scott Gesty	Libertarian	4,096	1.1%	
Nov 4, 2014	114th	At-large	general	John Carney	Democratic	137,251	59.3%	Rose Izzo	Republican	85,146	36.8%	
Nov 4, 2014	114th	At-large	general	John Carney	Democratic	137,251	59.3%	Bernard August	Green	4,801	2.1%	
Nov 4, 2014	114th	At-large	general	John Carney	Democratic	137,251	59.3%	Scott Gesty	Libertarian	4,419	1.9%	
Nov 8, 2016	115th	At-large	general	Lisa Blunt Rochester	Democratic	233,554	55.5%	Hans Reigle	Republican	172,301	41.0%	
Nov 8, 2016	115th	At-large	general	Lisa Blunt Rochester	Democratic	233,554	55.5%	Mark J. Perri	Green	8,326	2.0%	
Nov 8, 2016	115th	At-large	general	Lisa Blunt Rochester	Democratic	233,554	55.5%	Scott Gesty	Libertarian	6,436	1.5%	
Nov 6, 2018	116th	At-large	general	Lisa Blunt Rochester	Democratic	227,353	64.5%	Scott Walker	Republican	125,384	35.5%	
Nov 3, 2020	117th	At-large	general	Lisa Blunt Rochester	Democratic	281,382	57.6%	Lee H. Murphy	Republican	196,392	40.2%	
Nov 3, 2020	117th	At-large	general	Lisa Blunt Rochester	Democratic	281,382	57.6%	Catherine S. Purcell	Independent Party of Delaware	6,682	1.4%	
Nov 3, 2020	117th	At-large	general	Lisa Blunt Rochester	Democratic	281,382	57.6%	David L. Rogers	Libertarian	3,814	0.8%	
Nov 8, 2022	118th	At-large	general	Lisa Blunt Rochester	Democratic	178,416	55.5%	Lee H. Murphy	Republican	138,201	43.0%	
Nov 8, 2022	118th	At-large	general	Lisa Blunt Rochester	Democratic	178,416	55.5%	Cody McNutt	Libertarian	3,074	1.0%	
Nov 8, 2022	118th	At-large	general	Lisa Blunt Rochester	Democratic	178,416	55.5%	David L. Rogers	Non-Partisan Delaware	1,958	0.6%	
Nov 5, 2024	119th	At-large	general	TBD	TBD	TBD	TBD	Sarah McBride	Democratic	TBD	TBD	
Nov 5, 2024	119th	At-large	general	TBD	TBD	TBD	TBD	John Whalen	Republican	TBD	TBD	
