= George Rodney (disambiguation) =

George Brydges Rodney, 1st Baron Rodney (1719–1792) was a British naval officer.

George Rodney may also refer to:

- George B. Rodney (1803–1883), American lawyer and politician; U.S. representative from Delaware
- George B. Rodney Jr. (1842–1927), United States Army officer; sixth commander of the Department of Alaska and son of George B. Rodney
- George Rodney, 2nd Baron Rodney (1753–1802), British soldier and politician
- George Rodney, 3rd Baron Rodney (1782–1842), British peer
- George Brydges Harley Dennett Rodney, 7th Baron Rodney, British Army officer
- George Brydges Rodney (Royal Marines officer), British general
