= John J. Milligan =

American politician

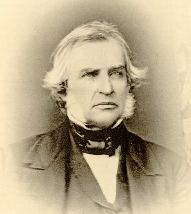

Associate Justice Delaware Superior Court
- In office September 19, 1839 – September 2, 1864
- Preceded by: James R. Black
- Succeeded by: Leonard E. Wales

Member of the U.S. House of Representatives from Delaware's at-large district
- In office March 4, 1831 – March 3, 1839
- Preceded by: Kensey Johns Jr.
- Succeeded by: Thomas Robinson Jr.

Personal details
- Born: December 10, 1795 Cecil County, Maryland, U.S.
- Died: April 20, 1875 (aged 79) Philadelphia, Pennsylvania, U.S.
- Party: Whig
- Spouse: Martha Levy
- Education: Princeton University
- Profession: Lawyer

John Jones Milligan (December 10, 1795 – April 20, 1875) was an American lawyer and politician from Wilmington, in New Castle County, Delaware. He was a member of the Whig Party, and served as U.S. Representative from Delaware.

== Political career ==
Milligan served eight years representing Delaware in the U.S. House of Representatives. Elected as an Anti-Jacksonian in 1830, he became a member of the Whig Party when it was organized, and served from March 4, 1831, until March 3, 1839. Having been defeated for reelection to a fifth term, he was appointed Associate Judge of the Delaware Superior Court on September 19, 1839, and served until September 16, 1864, when he retired.

== Death and legacy ==
Milligan died at his retirement home in Philadelphia and is buried in the Wilmington and Brandywine Cemetery at Wilmington.

Milligan is described in the Diaries of Edmund Canby as follows: "...(he)...is a beautiful speaker, his manner is fine, gestures good, matter well arranged, distinct and clear- certainly one of the most delightful speakers I have ever heard...Milligan would be a splendid speaker with practice...he has many happy hits and some beautiful classical illusions...He is, I am told, a fine classical scholar."

== Almanac ==
Elections were held the first Tuesday of October and, beginning 1832, the first Tuesday after November 1. U.S. Representatives took office March 4 and have a two-year term.

Public offices
| Office | Type | Location | Began office | Ended office | Notes |
|---|---|---|---|---|---|
| U.S. Representative | Legislature | Washington | March 4, 1831 | March 3, 1833 | |
| U.S. Representative | Legislature | Washington | March 4, 1833 | March 3, 1835 | |
| U.S. Representative | Legislature | Washington | March 4, 1835 | March 3, 1837 | |
| U.S. Representative | Legislature | Washington | March 4, 1837 | March 3, 1839 | |
| State Superior Court | Judicial | Dover | September 19, 1839 | September 16, 1864 | |

United States Congressional service
| Dates | Congress | Chamber | Majority | President | Committees | Class/District |
|---|---|---|---|---|---|---|
| 1831–1833 | 22nd | U.S. House | Democratic | Andrew Jackson | | at-large |
| 1833–1835 | 23rd | U.S. House | Democratic | Andrew Jackson | | at-large |
| 1835–1837 | 24th | U.S. House | Democratic | Andrew Jackson | | at-large |
| 1837–1838 | 25th | U.S. House | Democratic | Martin Van Buren | | at-large |

Election results
| Year | Office | Subject | Party | votes | % | Opponent | Party | votes | % |
|---|---|---|---|---|---|---|---|---|---|
| 1830 | U.S. Representative | John J. Milligan | Whig | 4,267 | 53% | Henry M. Ridgely | Democratic | 3,833 | 47% |
| 1832 | U.S. Representative | John J. Milligan | Whig | 4,257 | 51% | Martin W. Bates | Democratic | 4,142 | 49% |
| 1834 | U.S. Representative | John J. Milligan | Whig | 4,779 | 51% | James A. Bayard Jr. | Democratic | 4,626 | 49% |
| 1836 | U.S. Representative | John J. Milligan | Whig | 4,705 | 53% | Martin W. Bates | Democratic | 4,247 | 47% |
| 1838 | U.S. Representative | John J. Milligan | Whig | 4,379 | 50% | Thomas Robinson Jr. | Democratic | 4,437 | 50% |

== Places with more information ==
- Delaware Historical Society; website; 505 North Market Street, Wilmington, Delaware 19801; (302) 655-7161.
- University of Delaware; Library website; 181 South College Avenue, Newark, Delaware 19717; (302) 831-2965.
- Newark Free Library; 750 Library Ave., Newark, Delaware; (302) 731-7550.

U.S. House of Representatives
| Preceded by Kensey Johns Jr. | Member of the U.S. House of Representatives from Delaware's at-large congressional district 1831–1839 | Succeeded by Thomas Robinson Jr. |
