= George R. Riddle =

American politician (1817–1867)

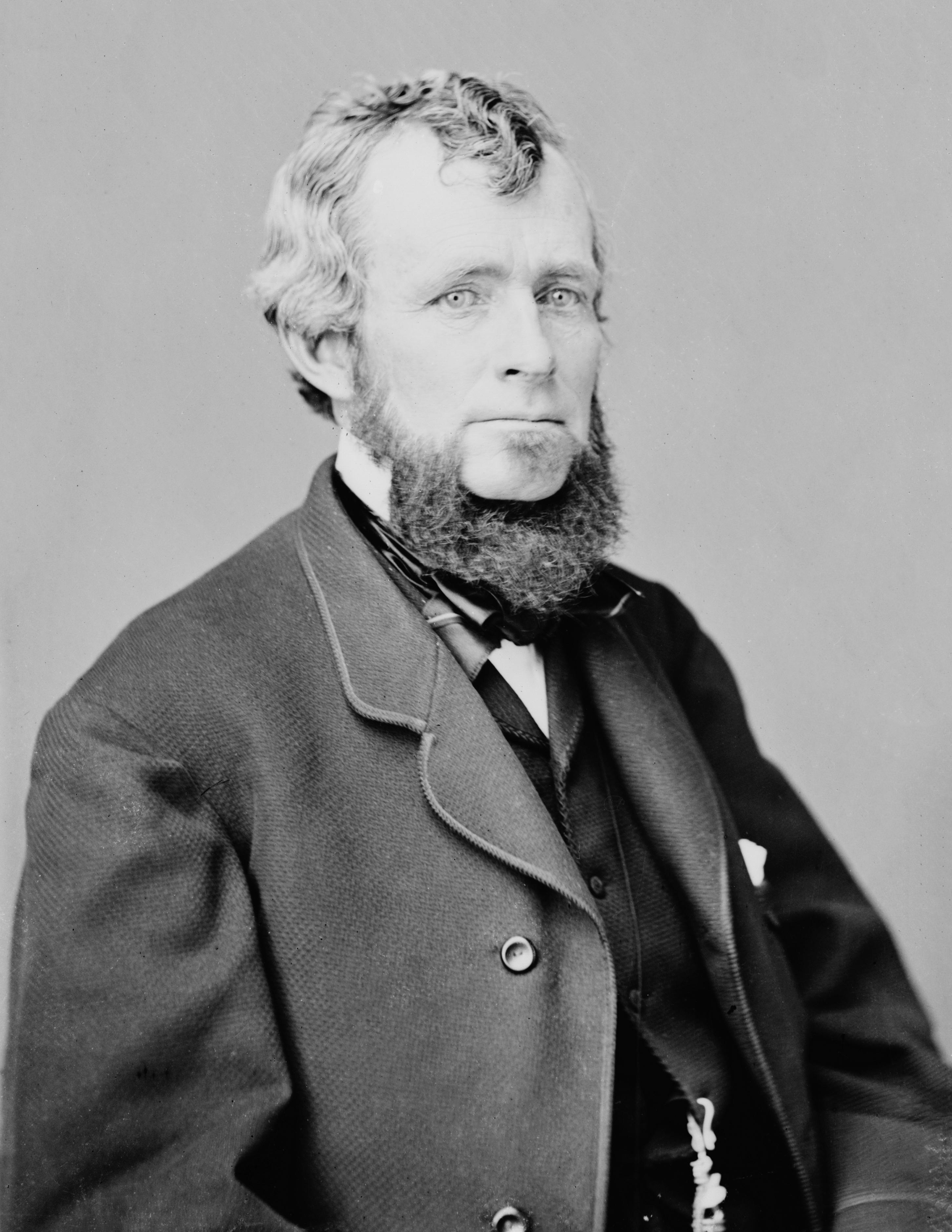
- Portrait by Mathew Brady, 1855–65

United States Senator from Delaware
- In office February 2, 1864 – March 28, 1867
- Preceded by: James A. Bayard Jr.
- Succeeded by: James A. Bayard Jr.

Member of the U.S. House of Representatives from Delaware's at-large district
- In office March 4, 1851 – March 3, 1855
- Preceded by: John W. Houston
- Succeeded by: Elisha D. Cullen

Personal details
- Born: c. 1817 New Castle, Delaware, U.S.
- Died: March 28, 1867 (aged 49–50) Washington, D.C., U.S.
- Party: Democratic
- Education: Delaware College
- Profession: Engineer, lawyer

George Read Riddle (c. 1817 – March 28, 1867) was an American engineer, lawyer and politician from Wilmington, Delaware. He was a member of the Democratic Party who served as U.S. representative and as U.S. senator from Delaware.

== Early life and family ==
Riddle was born in New Castle, Delaware, and studied civil engineering at Delaware College, now the University of Delaware. In addition he studied law and was admitted to the Delaware Bar in 1848, beginning a practice in Wilmington, Delaware. With his engineering background, he was named as a commissioner to retrace the Mason–Dixon line in 1849, and was otherwise engaged in the construction of railroads and canals. In 1844, Riddle was hired to design the Wilmington and Brandywine Cemetery. During the Civil War, Riddle served with the Home Guard of Wilmington. His wife's name was Margaret.

== Political career ==
From 1849 to 1850, Riddle served as a Deputy Attorney General of the United States. After losing in the election of 1844, he was elected to the U.S. House in 1850 and served for two terms from March 4, 1851, until March 3, 1855. During the 33rd Congress, Riddle was the Chairman of the Committee on Engraving. Running for a third term he was defeated in 1854 by Elisha D. Cullen.

In 1860, Riddle was one of only two slaveholders in Wilmington, Delaware. He owned three slaves, a 68-year-old male and two females aged 56 and 12.

On February 2, 1864, Riddle was elected to the United States Senate to fill the vacancy caused by the resignation of U.S. Senator James A. Bayard Jr. He was one of six senators to oppose the Thirteenth Amendment to the United States Constitution. He served until his death on March 28, 1867.

== Death and legacy ==
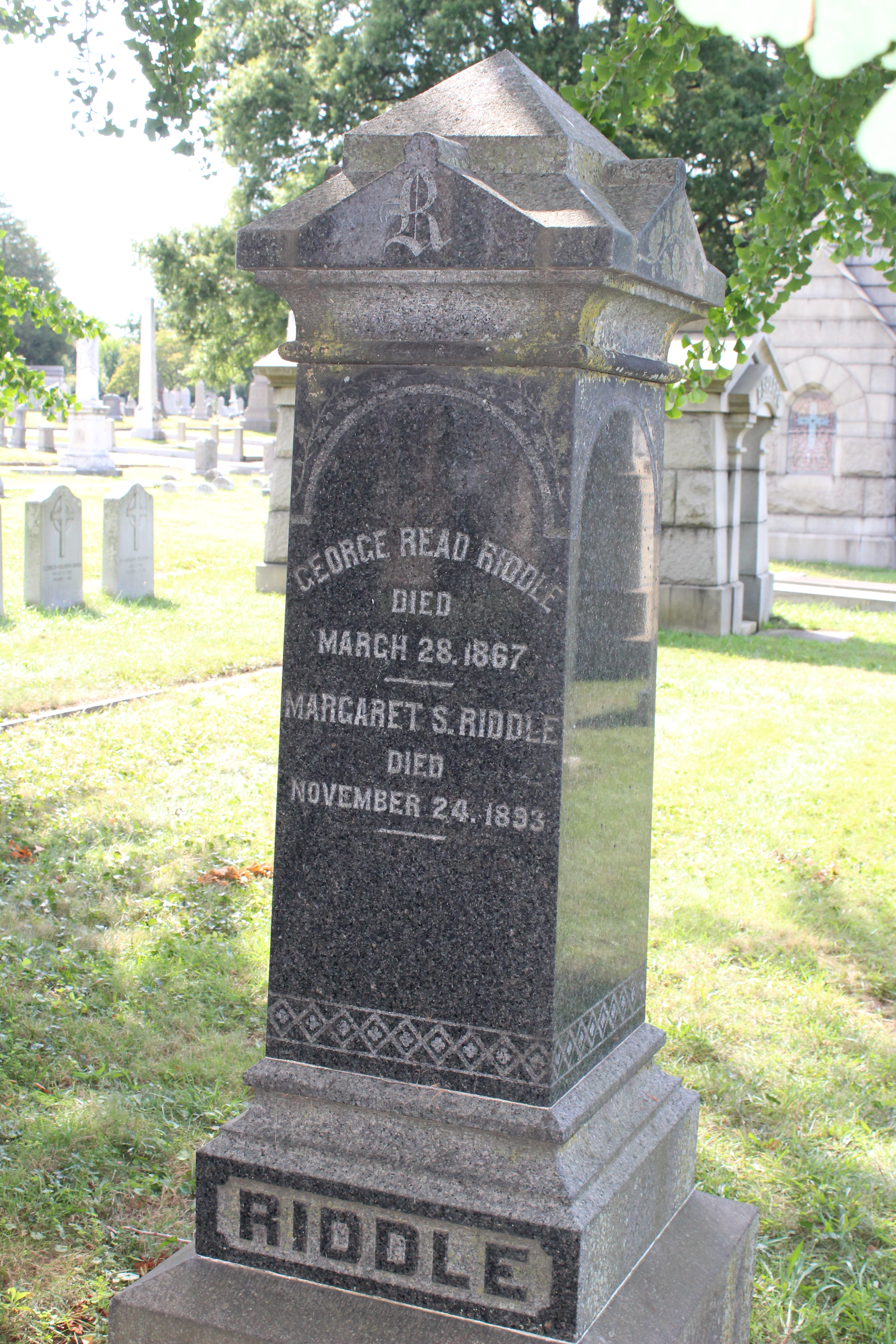
George R. Riddle's grave in Wilmington and Brandywine Cemetery

Riddle died while in office at Washington, D.C., and is buried in the Wilmington and Brandywine Cemetery at Wilmington.

== Almanac ==
Elections are held the first Tuesday after November 1. U.S. Representatives took office March 4 and have a two-year term. The General Assembly chose the U.S. Senators, who also took office March 4, but for a six-year term. In this case he was completing the existing term, the vacancy caused by the resignation of James A. Bayard Jr.

Public offices
Office	Type	Location	Began office	Ended office	Notes
U.S. Representative	Legislature	Washington	March 4, 1851	March 3, 1853	
U.S. Representative	Legislature	Washington	March 4, 1853	March 3, 1855	
U.S. Senator	Legislature	Washington	February 2, 1864	March 28, 1867	

United States congressional service
Dates	Congress	Chamber	Majority	President	Committees	Class/District
1851–1853	32nd	U.S. House	Democratic	Millard Fillmore		at-large
1853–1855	33rd	U.S. House	Democratic	Franklin Pierce		at-large
1863–1865	38th	U.S. Senate	Republican	Abraham Lincoln		class 1
1865–1867	39th	U.S. Senate	Republican	Andrew Johnson		class 1

Election results
Year	Office	Subject	Party	Votes	%	Opponent	Party	Votes	%	Notes
1844	U.S. Representative	George R. Riddle	Democratic	6,023	49%	John W. Houston	Whig	6,229	51%	
1850	U.S. Representative	George R. Riddle	Democratic	6,055	49%	George B. Rodney	Whig	5,926	48%	
1852	U.S. Representative	George R. Riddle	Democratic	6,692	50%	John W. Houston	Whig	6,630	50%	
1854	U.S. Representative	George R. Riddle	Democratic	6,334	48%	Elisha D. Cullen	American	6,820	52%	

== See also ==
- List of members of the United States Congress who died in office (1790–1899)

== Places with more information ==
- Delaware Historical Society; website; 505 North Market Street, Wilmington, Delaware 19801; (302) 655-7161.
- University of Delaware; Library website; 181 South College Avenue, Newark, Delaware 19717; (302) 831-2965.

U.S. House of Representatives
Preceded by John W. Houston	Member of the U.S. House of Representatives from Delaware's at-large congressional district March 4, 1851 – March 4, 1855	Succeeded by Elisha D. Cullen
U.S. Senate
Preceded by James A. Bayard Jr.	U.S. senator (Class 1) from Delaware; February 2, 1864 – March 28, 1867; Served alongside: Willard Saulsbury Sr.	Succeeded by James A. Bayard Jr.
