= Lewes Presbyterian Church =

Historic church in Delaware, United States

- U.S. National Register of Historic Places
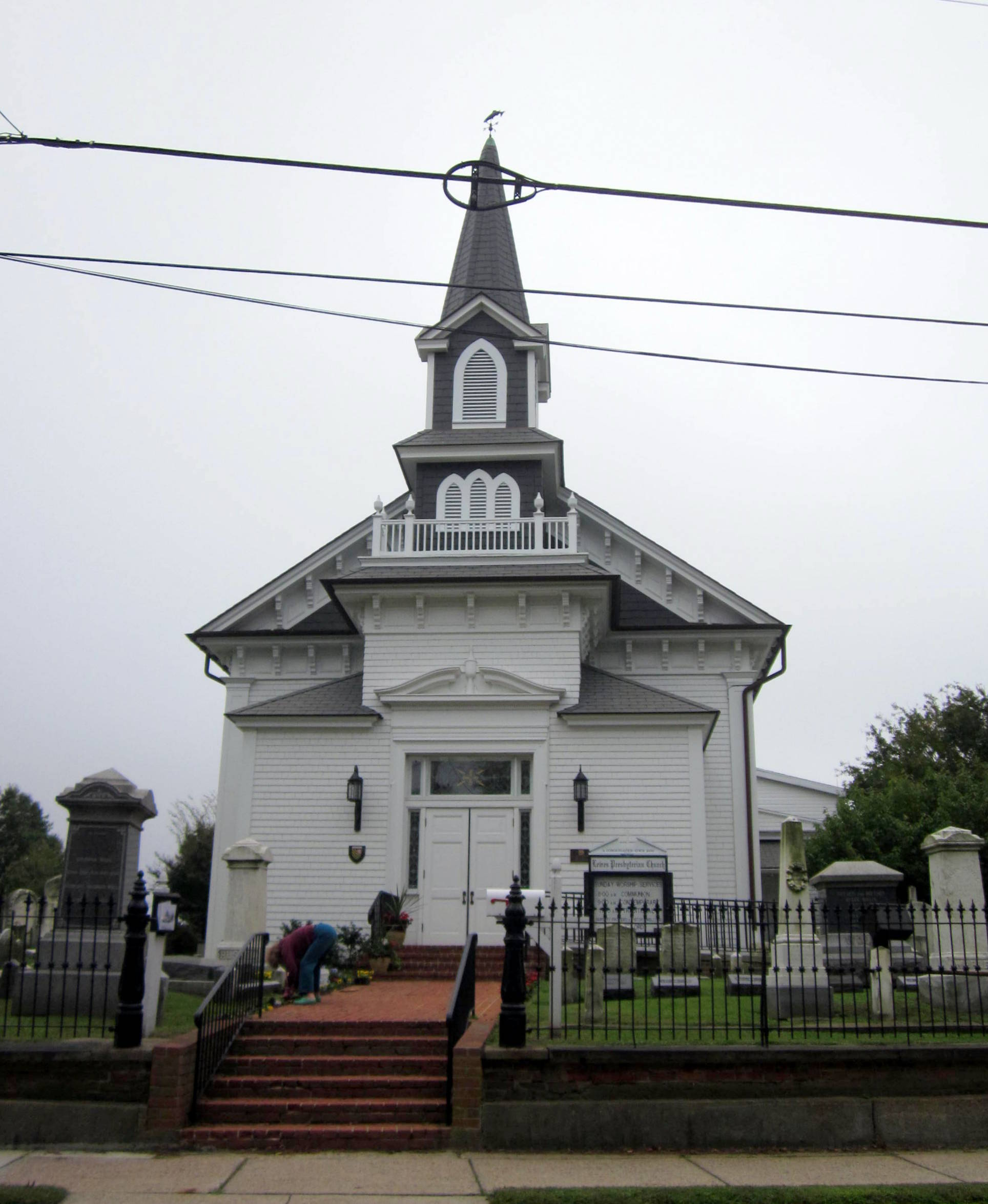
- Lewes Presbyterian Church, October 2011

- Location within Delaware Location within the United States
- Location: 100 Kings Highway, Lewes, Delaware
- Coordinates: 38°46′20″N 75°8′23″W
- Area: 2.5 acres (1.0 ha)
- Built: 1832
- Architectural style: Colonial Revival, Greek Revival, Gothic Revival
- NRHP reference No.: 77000394
- Added to NRHP: October 05, 1977

Lewes Presbyterian Church is a historic Presbyterian church building located at 100 Kings Highway in Lewes, Sussex County, Delaware. It was built in 1832, as a frame meeting house measuring 45 feet by 37 feet. In 1869, the church was renovated to add a number of a Gothic Revival style features and the addition of a chancel with Gothic windows. In 1886–1887, the tower and belfry were added and two massive Corinthian order columns were added to the interior. In 1931, the church acquired its Colonial Revival style front door.

The Lewes Presbyterian congregation was organized in 1692, and are the second oldest Presbyterian congregation in Delaware. The church is located on the site of the original 1727 brick church, which burned in 1871. Burials in the adjacent churchyard include two Delaware governors David Hall (1752–1817) and Ebe W. Tunnell (1844–1917) and congressman Robert G. Houston (1867–1946) and John W. Houston (1814–1896).

It was added to the National Register of Historic Places in 1977.

Lewes Presbyterian Church is a member of the denomination The Covenant Order of Evangelicals, also known as ECO. It is also a member of Heritage Presbytery.
