= 2008 United States House of Representatives election in Delaware =

- November 4, 2008
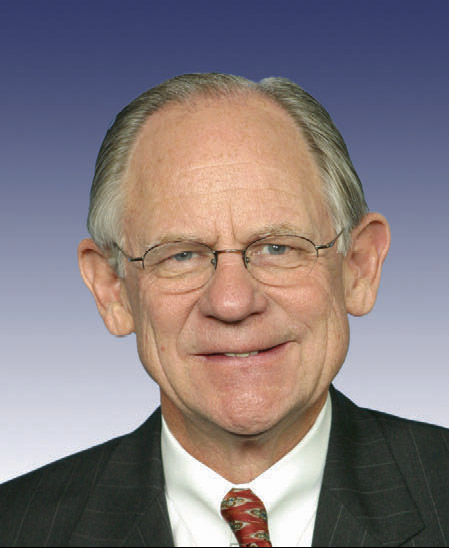

Nominee	Mike Castle	Karen Hartley-Nagle
Party	Republican	Democratic
Popular vote	235,437	146,434
Percentage	61.08%	37.99%
- Castle: 50–60% 60–70% 70–80% Hartley-Nagle: 50–60% 60–70%
U.S. Representative before election
Mike Castle
Republican
Elected U.S. Representative
Mike Castle
Republican

The 2008 United States House election in Delaware was held on November 4, 2008, to determine who will represent the state of Delaware in the United States House of Representatives for the 111th Congress, coinciding with the presidential election. The primary election was held on September 9, 2008.

Delaware has a single at-large representative in the House of Representatives. Republican incumbent Mike Castle was reelected for an eighth term. As of 2026, this is the last time where a Republican won a congressional race in Delaware, and the last statewide race where the Republican won New Castle County. It was an impressive display of ticket-splitting by Delaware voters, as Castle, a Republican, obtained over 60% of the vote, while the Democratic candidates in the concurrent presidential, Senate, and gubernatorial elections all received over 60% of the vote as well.

== Background ==
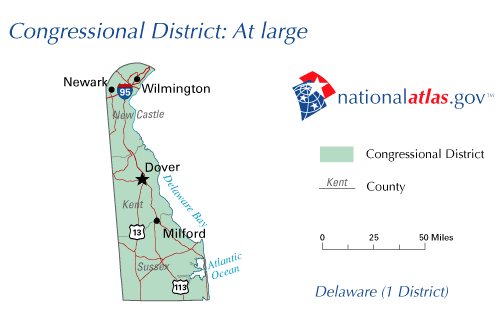
Map of Delaware's at-large congressional district

The state of Delaware is completely contained in a single at-large district. The district had a Cook Partisan Voting Index of D+7 in 2008. Since 1993, the district had been represented by Republican Mike Castle.

== Primary election ==
Primary elections in Delaware are closed primaries; that is, only voters who have declared a party affiliation may vote in that party's primary. Three Democrats were on the primary ballot: children's rights advocate and 2006 independent candidate Karen Hartley-Nagle, veterinarian and Vietnam War veteran Jerry Northington, and Michael Miller. Hartley-Nagle was nominated with 55.4 percent of the vote, with turnout at 28 percent. Castle did not face any Republican primary challengers.

Democratic primary for the 2008 Delaware House of Representatives election
Party	Candidate	Votes	%
Democratic	Karen Hartley-Nagle	35,995	55.4
Democratic	Jerry Northington	22,393	34.5
Democratic	Michael Miller	6,609	10.1
Total votes		64,997	100

== General election ==
In the general election, Republican incumbent Mike Castle was challenged by Democratic nominee Karen Hartley-Nagle and Libertarian Party candidate Mark Anthony Parks. CQ Politics forecasted the race in Delaware's at-large congressional district as 'Safe Republican'. Castle enjoyed a lead throughout the campaign, and ultimately won the election with slightly over 61 percent of the votes cast. Statewide turnout for the election was at 68 percent.

=== Predictions ===
Source	Ranking	As of
The Cook Political Report	Safe R	November 6, 2008
Rothenberg	Safe R	November 2, 2008
Sabato's Crystal Ball	Safe R	November 6, 2008
Real Clear Politics	Safe R	November 7, 2008
CQ Politics	Safe R	November 6, 2008

=== Results ===
2008 Delaware's at-large congressional district election
Party	Candidate	Votes	%
Republican	Mike Castle (incumbent)	235,437	61.08
Democratic	Karen Hartley-Nagle	146,434	37.99
Libertarian	Mark Parks	3,586	0.93
Total votes		385,457	100.00
Republican hold			

==== By county ====
County	Mike Castle Republican		Karen Hartley-Nagle Democratic		All Others	
County	#	%	#	%	#	%
New Castle	135,354	57.0%	99,714	42.0%	2,331	1.0%
Kent	40,303	64.0%	22,180	35.2%	467	0.7%
Sussex	59,780	70.2%	24,540	28.8%	788	0.9%
Totals	235,437	61.1%	146,434	38.0%	3,586	0.9%

== See also ==
- 2006 United States House of Representatives election in Delaware
