= John W. Houston =

American politician

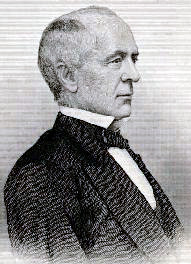

Member of the U.S. House of Representatives from Delaware's at-large district
- In office March 4, 1845 – March 3, 1851
- Preceded by: George B. Rodney
- Succeeded by: George R. Riddle

Personal details
- Born: May 4, 1814 Concord, Delaware, U.S.
- Died: April 26, 1896 (aged 81) Georgetown, Delaware, U.S.
- Party: Whig; Democratic
- Education: Yale College
- Profession: Lawyer

John Wallace Houston (May 4, 1814 – April 26, 1896) was an American lawyer and politician from Georgetown, in Sussex County, Delaware. He was a member of the Whig Party and the Democratic Party, and served as U.S. Representative from Delaware and a Justice of Delaware Superior Court.

== Early life and family ==
Houston was born on May 4, 1814, in Concord, Delaware, attended the country schools and Newark Academy, and graduated from Yale College in 1834. While at Yale he was initiated into one of the earliest gatherings of the Skull and Bones society. He studied law in Dover, Delaware, and was admitted to the Delaware Bar in 1837. He then moved to Georgetown, Delaware, in 1839 and commenced the practice of law.

== Professional and political career ==
Houston was Secretary of State of Delaware from 1841 to 1844, and was elected as a Whig to the 29th, 30th, and 31st Congress, serving from March 4, 1845, to March 3, 1851. While in the House he was chairman of the Committee on Public Buildings and Grounds for the 30th Congress. He was not a candidate for renomination in 1850, and was appointed associate judge of the Delaware Superior Court on May 4, 1855, retiring in 1893. Houston was a member of the Peace Conference of 1861, held in Washington, D.C., in an effort to devise means to prevent the impending Civil War.

== Death and legacy ==
Houston died at Georgetown, and is buried in the Lewes Presbyterian Church cemetery at Lewes, Delaware. His nephew, Robert G. Houston, was also a U.S. Representative from Delaware.

== See also ==
- List of Skull and Bones members

== Almanac ==
Elections are held the first Tuesday after November 1. U.S. Representatives took office March 4 and have a two-year term.

Public offices
Office	Type	Location	Began office	Ended office	Notes
U.S. Representative	Legislature	Washington	March 4, 1845	March 3, 1851	
Associate Justice	Judiciary	Georgetown	May 4, 1855	1893	Delaware

United States congressional service
Dates	Congress	Chamber	Majority	President	Committees	Class/District
1845–1847	29th	U.S. House	Democratic	James K. Polk		at-large
1847–1849	30th	U.S. House	Whig	James K. Polk	Public Buildings and Grounds	at-large
1849–1851	31st	U.S. House	Democratic	Zachary Taylor; Millard Fillmore		at-large

Election results
Year	Office	Subject	Party	Votes	%	Opponent	Party	Votes	%
1844	U.S. Representative	John W. Houston	Whig	6,229	51%	George R. Riddle	Democratic	6,023	49%
1846	U.S. Representative	John W. Houston	Whig	6,254	51%	John I. Dilworth	Democratic	6,007	49%
1848	U.S. Representative	John W. Houston	Whig	6,630	50%	William G. Whiteley	Democratic	6,026	49%
1852	U.S. Representative	John W. Houston	Whig	6,360	44%	George R. Riddle	Democratic	6,692	50%

== Places with more information ==
- Delaware Historical Society; website; 505 North Market Street, Wilmington, Delaware 19801; (302) 655-7161.
- University of Delaware; Library website; 181 South College Avenue, Newark, Delaware 19717; (302) 831-2965.

U.S. House of Representatives
Preceded by George B. Rodney	Member of the U.S. House of Representatives from Delaware's at-large congressional district March 4, 1845 – March 4, 1851	Succeeded by George R. Riddle
