= James R. Lofland =

American politician (1823–1894)

Member of the U.S. House of Representatives from Delaware's at-large district
- In office March 4, 1873 – March 3, 1875
- Preceded by: Benjamin T. Biggs
- Succeeded by: James Williams

Personal details
- Born: November 2, 1823 Milford, Delaware, U.S.
- Died: February 10, 1894 (aged 70) Milford, Delaware, U.S.
- Party: Republican
- Education: Dickinson College
- Profession: Lawyer

James Rush Lofland (November 2, 1823 – February 10, 1894) was an American lawyer and politician from Milford, in Kent County, Delaware. He was a member of the Republican Party, and served as U.S. Representative from Delaware.

== Early life and family ==
Born in Milford, Delaware, he received a classical education and was graduated from Delaware College at Newark in 1845. He studied law, and was admitted to the Delaware Bar in 1848, commencing his practice in Milford.

== Professional and political career ==
In 1849 he was secretary of the Delaware Senate and was a member of the State constitutional convention in 1853. He was Secretary of State of Delaware from 1855 to 1859, and a paymaster in the United States Army from 1863 to 1867. During the 1872 presidential election he was a delegate to the Republican National Convention.

Lofland was elected as a Republican to the 43rd Congress, serving from March 4, 1873, to March 3, 1875. He was an unsuccessful candidate for reelection in 1874 to the 44th Congress, and resumed the practice of law.

== Death and legacy ==
Lofland died at Milford and is buried there in the Odd Fellows Cemetery.

== Almanac ==
Elections were held the first Tuesday after November 1. U.S. representatives took office March 4.

Public offices
Office	Type	Location	Began office	Ended office	Notes
U.S. Representative	Legislature	Washington	March 4, 1873	March 3, 1875	

United States congressional service
Dates	Congress	Chamber	Majority	President	Committees	Class/District
1873–1875	43rd	U.S. House	Republican	Ulysses S. Grant		at-large

Election results
Year	Office	Subject	Party	votes	%	Opponent	Party	votes	%
1872	U.S. Representative	James R. Lofland	Republican	11,378	51%	Eustis Wright	Democratic	11,023	49%
1874	U.S. Representative	James R. Lofland	Republican	11,024	47%	James Williams	Democratic	12,602	53%

== Places with more information ==
- Delaware Historical Society; website; 505 North Market Street, Wilmington, Delaware 19801; (302) 655–7161.
- University of Delaware; Library website; 181 South College Avenue, Newark, Delaware 19717; (302) 831–2965.
- Newark Free Library; 750 Library Ave., Newark, Delaware; (302) 731–7550.

U.S. House of Representatives
Preceded by Benjamin T. Biggs	Member of the U.S. House of Representatives from Delaware's at-large congressional district 1873–1875	Succeeded by James Williams
