= Robert G. Houston =

American politician (1867–1946)

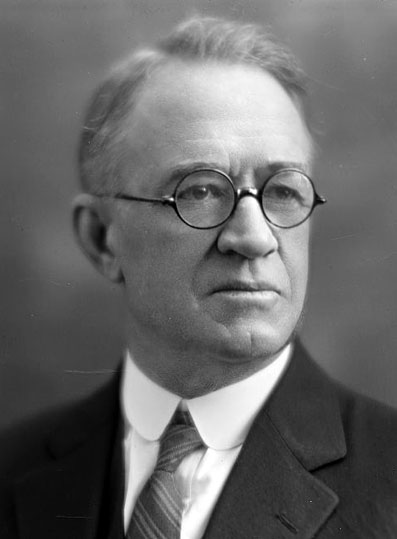

Member of the U.S. House of Representatives from Delaware's at-large district
- In office March 4, 1925 – March 3, 1933
- Preceded by: William H. Boyce
- Succeeded by: Wilbur L. Adams

Personal details
- Born: October 13, 1867 Milton, Delaware, U.S.
- Died: January 29, 1946 (aged 78) Lewes, Delaware, U.S.
- Party: Republican
- Spouse: Margaret Burton White Houston (m. 1888)
- Occupation: Publisher

Robert Griffith Houston (October 13, 1867 – January 29, 1946) was an American lawyer, publisher and politician from Georgetown, in Sussex County, Delaware. He was a member of the Republican Party, and served four terms as U.S. Representative from Delaware. "Houston" is pronounced "house-ton", unlike the city in Texas with the same spelling.

== Early life and family ==
Houston was born in Milton, Delaware. He attended public schools in Lewes, and was the nephew of John W. Houston, who had served as U.S. Representative from Delaware between 1845 and 1851. He married Margaret White in 1888, an active suffragist and clubwoman.

== Professional career ==
That same year, 1888, Houston was admitted to the Delaware Bar and began the practice of law in Georgetown. He served in the Delaware National Guard from 1890 to 1895, and in 1893 started The Sussex Republican a Sussex County newspaper. He was its owner and publisher until 1934. The paper continued under the name The Sussex Countian until 1946. Houston also served as the President of the First National Bank of Georgetown from 1901 to 1903.

== Political career ==
In 1900, President William McKinley appointed Houston collector of customs for the district of Delaware, a post he held until 1904. He also served as Assistant Attorney General of Delaware from 1920 to 1924.

In 1924, popular Republican President Calvin Coolidge was reelected and led his party to a gain of 24 seats in the House of Representatives. Houston was elected to this U.S. House in 1924, defeating incumbent Democratic U.S. Representative William H. Boyce. He won election four times in all, also defeating Democrats Merrill H. Tilghman in 1926, John M. Richardson in 1928, and John P. LeFevre in 1930.

During these four terms, he served in the Republican majority in the 69th, 70th, and 71st congresses, but was in the minority in the 72nd Congress. He did not seek reelection in 1932, at the height of the Great Depression. In all, Houston served from March 4, 1925, until March 3, 1933, during the administrations of U.S. presidents Calvin Coolidge and Herbert Hoover.

After leaving the U.S. House, Houston again served as Assistant Attorney General of Delaware from 1933 to 1935. In 1936, Houston ran for the U.S. Senate as an Independent-Republican. He finished third behind the incumbent Republican Daniel O. Hastings, and the successful candidate, Democratic James H. Hughes. Following this he retired from politics and resumed his career as a publisher.

== Death and legacy ==
Houston died at Lewes, and is buried there in the Lewes Presbyterian Church cemetery, along with his uncle, former U.S. Representative John W. Houston.

== Almanac ==
Elections are held the first Tuesday after November 1. U.S. Representatives took office March 4 and have a two-year term.

Public Offices
Office	Type	Location	Began office	Ended office	notes
U.S. Representative	Legislature	Washington	Republican	March 4, 1925	March 3, 1927
U.S. Representative	Legislature	Washington	Republican	March 4, 1927	March 3, 1929
U.S. Representative	Legislature	Washington	Republican	March 4, 1929	March 3, 1931
U.S. Representative	Legislature	Washington	Republican	March 4, 1931	March 3, 1933

United States Congressional service
Dates	Congress	Chamber	Majority	President	Committees	Class/District
1925–1927	69th	U.S. House	Republican	Calvin Coolidge		at-large
1927–1929	70th	U.S. House	Republican	Calvin Coolidge		at-large
1929–1931	71st	U.S. House	Republican	Herbert Hoover		at-large
1931–1933	72nd	U.S. House	Democratic	Herbert Hoover		at-large

Election results
Year	Office	Subject	Party	Votes	%	Opponent	Party	Votes	%
1924	U.S. Representative	Robert G. Houston	Republican	51,536	58%	William H. Boyce	Democratic	35,943	41%
1926	U.S. Representative	Robert G. Houston	Republican	38,919	57%	Merrill H. Tilghman	Democratic	29,424	43%
1928	U.S. Representative	Robert G. Houston	Republican	66,361	64%	John M. Richardson	Democratic	38,045	36%
1930	U.S. Representative	Robert G. Houston	Republican	48,493	56%	John P. Le Fevre	Democratic	38,391	44%
1936	U.S. Senator	Robert G. Houston	Independent; Republican	6,897	5%	James H. Hughes; Daniel O. Hastings	Democratic; Republican	67,136; 52,469	53% 41%

U.S. House of Representatives
Preceded by William H. Boyce	Member of the U.S. House of Representatives from Delaware's at-large congressional district March 4, 1925 – March 4, 1933	Succeeded by Wilbur L. Adams
