= Michael Berg (activist) =

American activist and politician (born 1945)

Michael Steven Berg
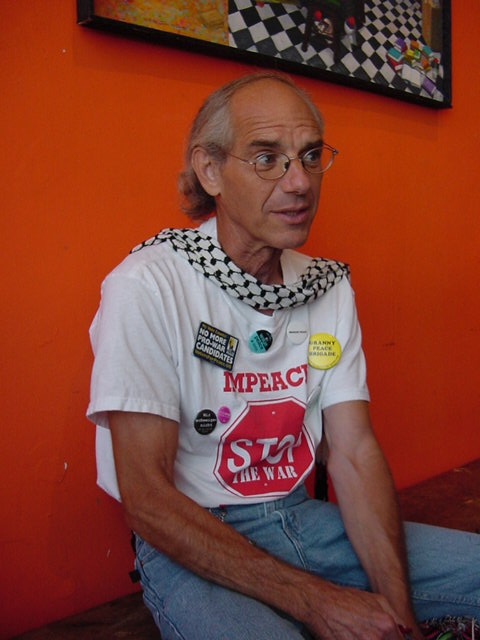
- Berg in 2006

Personal details
- Born: March 3, 1945 (age 81) Philadelphia, Pennsylvania, U.S.
- Spouse: Suzanne
- Children: 3 (including Nick Berg)
- Education: Bucknell University (BA, Teaching Certificate), Temple University (MEd)
- Occupation: Activist, politician
- Known for: Father of Nick Berg, Green Party candidate for United States House of Representatives

Michael Steven Berg (born March 3, 1945) is an American activist and politician who was a candidate for the United States House of Representatives in the State of Delaware on the Green Party ticket in the 2006 midterm elections. He is most well known as the father of Nick Berg, one of the first American civilians to be abducted and beheaded by insurgents in Iraq.

== Early life ==
Michael Berg was born in Philadelphia, Pennsylvania. Berg accepted a Bachelor of Arts degree in English literature and a teaching certificate at Bucknell University in 1967, and a master's degree in education from Temple University in 1969.

Berg, a longtime antiwar activist, was involved in the protests against the Vietnam War beginning in 1965. According to his website, "In 1991, when the United States invaded Iraq in the Gulf War, Berg intensified his protest activities despite reprimands from his school's administrator. He has protested the Bush administration's invasion of Iraq as well, organizing local marches, protests, and vigils and traveling to Washington, D.C."

== Son's death ==
Berg's son Nick, a telecommunications contractor, was detained in Iraq for 13 days in March 2004 by U.S. military and the Federal Bureau of Investigation. After his release and after refusals to return to the States with help from U.S. government, and in the aftermath of the Abu Ghraib revelations, Nick was abducted and murdered by Islamic militants on May 7, 2004. A video of his decapitation was posted on the internet, leading to international media coverage of Michael Berg, his family, and his antiwar stance.

Berg has blamed former U.S. President George W. Bush and former U.S. Defense Secretary Donald H. Rumsfeld for his son's death.

== Political career ==
In August 2004 Michael Berg was presented with the Courageous Resister Award at New York University. A year later he received the Adele Dwyer St. Thomas of Villanova Peace Award.

In 2005 Berg moved from Chester County, Pennsylvania, to Wilmington, Delaware, where he registered as a member of the Green Party. In an interview with Democracy Now!, he said he was approached by representatives of the Democratic Party but would run with the Green Party because: "the Democrats have the money to get the message out, but they have the wrong message."

In the 2006 race for Delaware's at-large congressional district seat in the United States House of Representatives, Berg ran as the Green Party candidate. He challenged incumbent Michael N. Castle of the Republican Party, along with Dennis Spivack of the Democratic Party, and Karen M. Hartley-Nagle of the Independent Party. Castle was reelected with 57 percent of the total vote. According to his campaign website, Berg received 4,463 votes or 1.8 percent of the total vote.

A documentary was filmed focusing on Berg's campaign titled Keeping the Peace. It premiered at the Philadelphia Independent Film Festival in 2009 and won the Audience Award.

== See also ==
- 2006 Delaware congressional election
