= Elisha D. Cullen =

American politician

Member of the U.S. House of Representatives from Delaware's at-large district
- In office March 4, 1855 – March 3, 1857
- Preceded by: George R. Riddle
- Succeeded by: William G. Whiteley

Personal details
- Born: April 23, 1799 Millsboro, Delaware, U.S.
- Died: February 8, 1862 (aged 62) Georgetown, Delaware, U.S.
- Party: American
- Education: Princeton College
- Profession: Lawyer

Elisha Dickerson Cullen (April 23, 1799 – February 8, 1862) was an American lawyer and politician from Georgetown, in Sussex County, Delaware. He was a member of the American Party, and served as U.S. Representative from Delaware.

== Early life and family ==
Cullen was born in Millsboro, Delaware, attended Princeton College, studied law, was admitted to the Delaware Bar in 1821 and commenced practice in Georgetown. His sons included Charles M. Cullen, an Associate Justice from Sussex County, and his grandsons included a lawyer, Charles W. Cullen.

== Professional and political career ==
He was elected as the candidate of the American Party to the 34th Congress, but was an unsuccessful candidate for reelection in 1856 to the 35th Congress. Consequently, he resumed the practice of law in Georgetown. He was a slaveholder.

== Death and legacy ==
Cullen died at Georgetown, and is buried in the Presbyterian Church Cemetery at Lewes, Delaware.

== Almanac ==
Elections are held the first Tuesday after November 1. U.S. Representatives took office March 4 and have a two-year term.

Public offices
Office	Type	Location	Began office	Ended office	Notes
U.S. Representative	Legislature	Washington	March 4, 1855	March 3, 1857	

United States congressional service
Dates	Congress	Chamber	Majority	President	Committees	Class/District
1855–1857	34th	U.S. House	American	Franklin Pierce		at-large

Election results
Year	Office	Subject	Party	Votes	%	Opponent	Party	Votes	%
1854	U.S. Representative	Elisha D. Cullen	American	6,820	52%	George R. Riddle	Democratic	6,334	48%
1856	U.S. Representative	Elisha D. Cullen	American	6,360	44%	William G. Whiteley	Democratic	8,111	56%

U.S. House of Representatives
Preceded by George R. Riddle	Member of the U.S. House of Representatives from Delaware's at-large congressional district 1855–1857	Succeeded by William G. Whiteley
