= George B. Rodney Jr. =

U.S. Army brigadier general

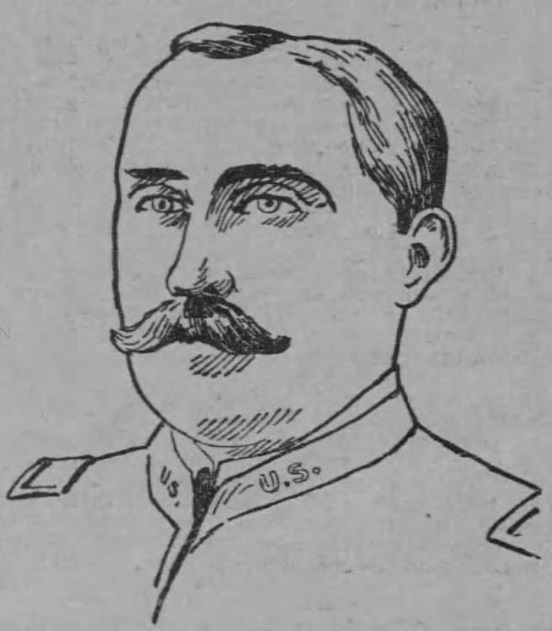
- The Topeka State Journal, October 1, 1902
- Born: October 7, 1842; New Castle, Delaware, U.S.
- Died: September 21, 1927 (aged 84); San Francisco, California, U.S.
- Burial place: San Francisco National Cemetery
- Spouse: Janet (Warren) Rodney (m. 1870–1918)
- Children: 2
- Relatives: George B. Rodney (father); Daniel Rodney (grandfather); Richard Seymour Rodney (nephew)
- Military career
- Allegiance: United States (Union)
- Service: Union Army; United States Army
- Service years: 1861–1865 (Union); 1865–1903 (Army)
- Rank: Brigadier General
- Unit: U.S. Army Field Artillery Branch
- Commands: Company D, 4th Field Artillery Regiment; Department of Alaska; Fort Adams; Cavalry and Field Artillery School; Artillery District of San Francisco
- Known for: Chief federal officer of the Department of Alaska
- Wars: American Civil War; American Indian Wars; Spanish–American War

George Brydges Rodney (7 October 1842 – 21 September 1927) was an officer in the United States Army who served as the sixth commander of the Department of Alaska, from April 21, 1874, to August 16, 1874.

At the outbreak of the American Civil War, he enlisted in the Union Army on April 23, 1861, in an independent company of artillery formed in Pennsylvania. He was promoted in the Regular Army to the rank of 1st lieutenant in the 4th Artillery on the 5th of August of the same year. He received a brevet (honorary promotion) to the rank of major on September 20, 1863.

He remained in the Army after the war and was promoted to captain in 1869, major in 1892, lieutenant colonel in 1899 and to colonel in 1901. He was promoted to brigadier general the day before his retirement from the Army on August 5, 1903.

He was a companion of the Military Order of the Loyal Legion of the United States.

He was the son of Delaware politician George B. Rodney and Mary J. (Duval) Rodney.

== See also ==
List of governors of Alaska
