= Thomas Robinson Jr. =

American lawyer and politician from Delaware

Member of the U.S. House of Representatives from Delaware's at-large district
- In office March 4, 1839 – March 3, 1841
- Preceded by: John J. Milligan
- Succeeded by: George B. Rodney

Personal details
- Born: 1800 Georgetown, Delaware, U.S.
- Died: October 28, 1843 (aged 42–43) Georgetown, Delaware, U.S.
- Party: Democratic
- Education: Princeton University
- Profession: Lawyer

Thomas Robinson Jr. (1800 – October 28, 1843) was an American lawyer and politician from Georgetown, in Sussex County, Delaware. He was a member of the Democratic Party, and served as U.S. Representative from Delaware.

== Early life and family ==
Robinson was born 1800 in Georgetown, Delaware. He graduated from Princeton College, studied law and was admitted to the Delaware Bar in 1823, and began practice in Sussex County, Delaware.

== Professional and political career ==
Robinson became Treasurer of Sussex County in 1823, and was elected as a commissioner on the county Levy Court in 1831 and 1832. He served two years representing Delaware in the U.S. House of Representatives. Elected as a member of the Democratic Party, he served from March 4, 1839, until March 3, 1841.

== Death and legacy ==
Robinson died at Georgetown, Delaware, and is buried there in the Old Cemetery of St. George's Chapel.

== Almanac ==
Elections are held the first Tuesday after November 1. U.S. Representatives took office March 4 and have a two-year term.

Public offices
Office	Type	Location	Began office	Ended office	Notes
U.S. Representative	Legislature	Washington	March 4, 1839	March 3, 1841	

United States congressional service
Dates	Congress	Chamber	Majority	President	Committees	Class/District
1839–1841	26th	U.S. House	Democratic	Martin Van Buren		at-large

Election results
Year	Office	Subject	Party	votes	%	Opponent	Party	votes	%
1838	U.S. Representative	Thomas Robinson Jr.	Democratic	4,437	50%	John J. Milligan	Whig	4,379	50%
1840	U.S. Representative	Thomas Robinson Jr.	Democratic	4,974	46%	George B. Rodney	Whig	5,896	54%

== Places with more information ==
- Delaware Historical Society; website; 505 North Market Street, Wilmington, Delaware 19801; (302) 655-7161.
- University of Delaware; Library website; 181 South College Avenue, Newark, Delaware 19717; (302) 831-2965.

U.S. House of Representatives
Preceded by John J. Milligan	Member of the U.S. House of Representatives from Delaware's at-large congressional district 1839–1841	Succeeded by George B. Rodney
