= Edward L. Martin =

American politician

Member of the U.S. House of Representatives from Delaware's at-large district
- In office March 4, 1879 – March 3, 1883
- Preceded by: James Williams
- Succeeded by: Charles B. Lore

Personal details
- Born: March 29, 1837 Seaford, Delaware, U.S.
- Died: January 22, 1897 (aged 59) Seaford, Delaware, U.S.
- Party: Democratic
- Education: University of Virginia
- Profession: Businessman

Edward Livingston Martin (March 29, 1837 – January 22, 1897) was an American lawyer and politician from Seaford, in Sussex County, Delaware. He was a member of the Democratic Party, and served as U.S. Representative from Delaware.

== Early life and family ==
Martin was born in Seaford, Delaware, and attended private schools, Newark Academy, Bolmar's Academy in West Chester, Pennsylvania, and Delaware College in Newark. He graduated from the University of Virginia at Charlottesville in 1859.

== Professional and political career ==
Martin served as clerk of the Delaware Senate from 1863 to 1865. He was a delegate to the Democratic National Conventions in 1864, 1872, 1876, 1880, and 1884. He studied law at the University of Virginia in 1866, was admitted to the Delaware Bar the same year and practiced in Dover until 1867. He then returned to Seaford and engaged in agricultural and horticultural pursuits, and served as director of the Delaware Board of Agriculture, president of the Peninsula Horticultural Society, and lecturer of the Delaware State Grange.

He was a commissioner to settle the disputed boundary line between the states of Delaware and New Jersey between 1873 and 1875. He was elected as a Democrat to the 46th and 47th Congress, serving from March 4, 1879, to March 4, 1883. He was not a candidate for renomination in 1882 and resumed horticultural and agricultural pursuits. He was twice an unsuccessful candidate for election to the U.S. Senate.

== Death and legacy ==
Martin died at Seaford and is buried there in the St. Luke's Episcopal Churchyard.

== Almanac ==
Elections are held the first Tuesday after November 1. U.S. representatives took office March 4 and have a two-year term.

Public Offices
Office	Type	Location	Began office	Ended office	notes
U.S. Representative	Legislature	Washington	March 4, 1879	March 3, 1881	
U.S. Representative	Legislature	Washington	March 4, 1881	March 3, 1883	

United States Congressional service
Dates	Congress	Chamber	Majority	President	Committees	Class/District
1879–1881	46th	U.S. House	Democratic	Rutherford B. Hayes		at-large
1881–1883	47th	U.S. House	Republican	James A. Garfield; Chester A. Arthur		at-large

Election results
Year	Office	Subject	Party	Votes	%	Opponent	Party	Votes	%
1878	U.S. Representative	Edward L. Martin	Democratic	10,576	78%	John G. Jackson	Greenback	2,966	22%
1880	U.S. Representative	Edward L. Martin	Democratic	14,966	51%	John W. Houston	Republican	14,336	49%

== Places with more information ==
- Delaware Historical Society; website; 505 North Market Street, Wilmington, Delaware 19801; (302) 655-7161.
- University of Delaware; Library website; 181 South College Avenue, Newark, Delaware 19717; (302) 831-2965.

U.S. House of Representatives
Preceded by James Williams	Member of the U.S. House of Representatives from Delaware's at-large congressional district 1879–1883	Succeeded by Charles B. Lore
