= James Williams (Delaware politician) =

American politician (1925–1899)

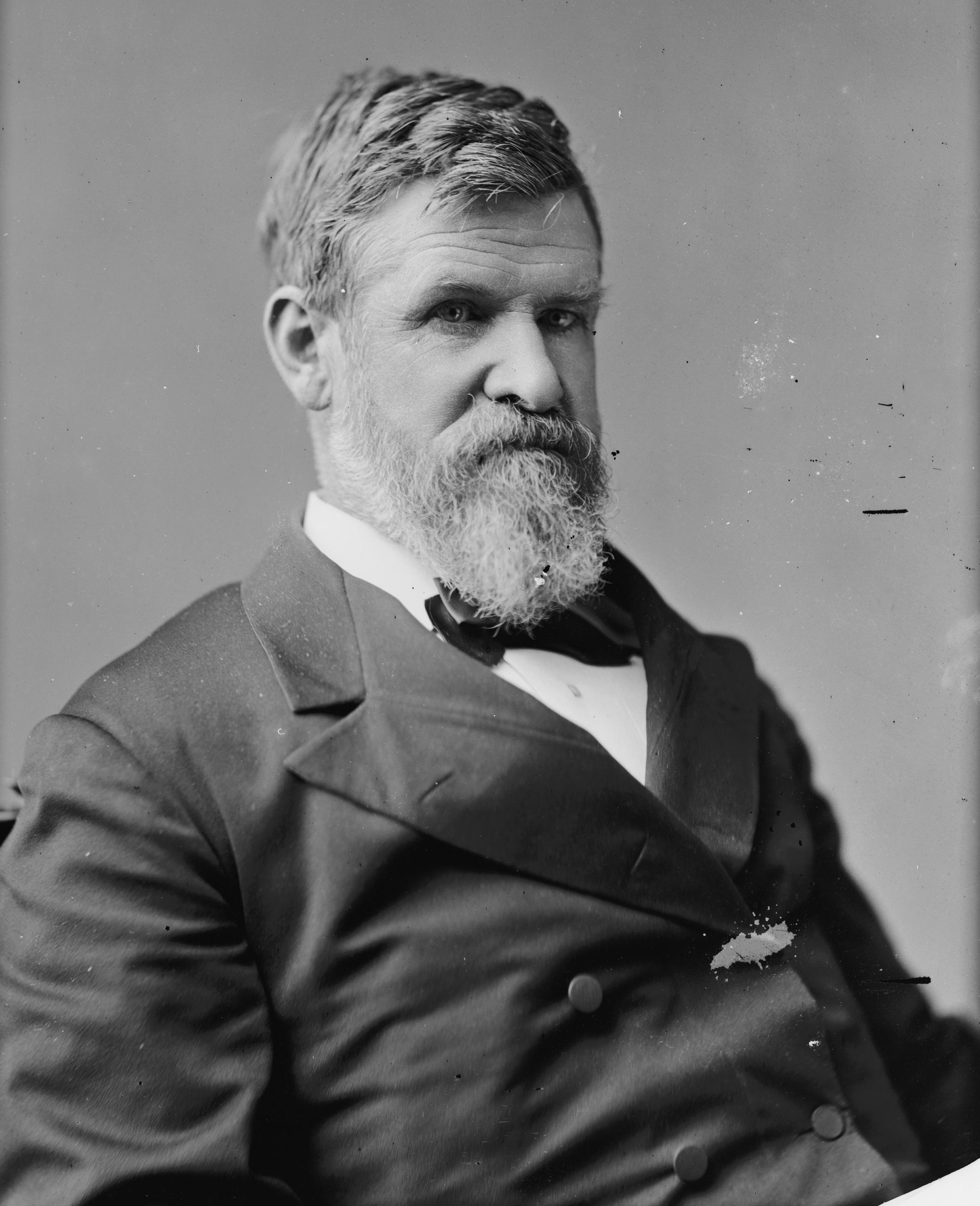

Member of the U.S. House of Representatives from Delaware's at-large district
- In office March 4, 1875 – March 3, 1879
- Preceded by: James R. Lofland
- Succeeded by: Edward L. Martin

Member of the Delaware Senate
- In office January 4, 1891 - January 3, 1893

Member of the Delaware House of Representatives
- In office January 4, 1857 - January 3, 1859; January 4, 1863 - January 3, 1865; January 4, 1883 - January 3, 1885

Personal details
- Born: August 4, 1825 Philadelphia, Pennsylvania, US
- Died: April 12, 1899 (aged 73) Smyrna, Delaware, US
- Party: Democratic
- Profession: farmer

James Williams (August 4, 1825 – April 12, 1899) was an American farmer and politician. He was a member of the Democratic Party, who served in the Delaware General Assembly and as U. S. Representative from Delaware.

== Early life and family ==
Williams was born on August 4, 1825, in Philadelphia, to John (1775–1849) and Esther Williams. His father was a lumber merchant, and his early education was by private tutoring. He first became an apprentice carpenter, intending to become an architect. In 1848 his father bought a large estate in Kent County, Delaware and young Williams moved to Kenton to take up farming and manage the property.

== Professional and political career ==
Williams became politically active in the Democratic Party, and was elected to the Delaware House of Representatives, serving in 1857/1858, 1863/1864 and 1883/84. He next served in the State Senate from 1891/92, and was the Speaker of the Senate for 1869/70. In 1872, he was a delegate to the party's national convention which nominated Horace Greeley for U.S. president. Williams was twice elected as Delaware's only member in the United States House of Representatives, serving in two terms from 1875 until 1879, in the 44th and 45th Congress under U.S. Presidents Ulysses S. Grant and Rutherford B. Hayes.

He remained a farmer throughout his public service. After returning to private life he expanded into fertilizer manufacturing, and increased his farm holdings in Delaware and Maryland. In 1891 he moved to Smyrna, Delaware, but continued farming for the rest of his life.

== Death and legacy ==
Williams died on April 12, 1899, in Smyrna, Delaware, and is buried there, at the St. Peter's Episcopal Church Cemetery.

== Electoral history ==
Public Offices
Office	Type	Location	Began office	Ended office	notes
State House	Legislature	Dover	January 4, 1857	January 3, 1859	
State House	Legislature	Dover	January 4, 1863	January 3, 1865	
State House	Legislature	Dover	January 4, 1883	January 3, 1885	
State Senate	Legislature	Dover	January 4, 1891	January 3, 1893	
U.S. Representative	Legislature	Washington	March 4, 1875	March 3, 1877	
U.S. Representative	Legislature	Washington	March 4, 1877	March 3, 1879	

Delaware General Assembly service
Dates	Assembly	Chamber	Majority	Governor	Committees	District
1857/58	69th	State House	Democratic	Peter F. Causey		Kent at-large
1863/64	72nd	State House	Democratic	William Cannon		Kent at-large
1883/84	82nd	State House	Democratic	Charles Stockley		Kent at-large
1891/92	86th	State Senate	Democratic	Robert J. Reynolds		Kent at-large

United States Congressional service
Dates	Congress	Chamber	Majority	President	Committees	Class/District
1875–1877	44th	U.S. House	Democratic	Ulysses S. Grant		at-large
1877–1879	45th	U.S. House	Democratic	Rutherford B. Hayes		at-large

Election results
Year	Office	Subject	Party	Votes	%	Opponent	Party	Votes	%
1874	U.S. Representative	James Williams	Democratic	12,602	53%	James R. Lofland	Republican	11,024	47%
1876	U.S. Representative	James Williams	Democratic	13,169	55%	Levi C. Bird	Republican	10,592	44%

U.S. House of Representatives
Preceded by James R. Lofland	Member of the U.S. House of Representatives from Delaware's at-large congressional district 1875–1879	Succeeded by Edward L. Martin
