= 1798 United States House of Representatives election in Delaware =

- October 2, 1798
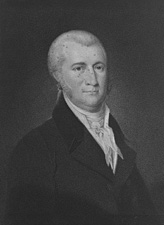

Nominee	James A. Bayard Sr.	Archibald Alexander
Party	Federalist	Democratic-Republican
Popular vote	2,792	1,772
Percentage	61.17%	38.83%
U.S. Representative before election
James A. Bayard Sr.
Federalist
Elected U.S. Representative
James A. Bayard Sr.
Federalist

The 1798 United States House of Representatives election in Delaware was held on October 2, 1798. The incumbent Representative James A. Bayard Sr. won reelection.

== Results ==
1798 United States House of Representatives election in Delaware
Party	Candidate	Votes	%
Federalist	James A. Bayard Sr. (incumbent)	2,792	61.17%
Democratic-Republican	Archibald Alexander	1,772	38.83%
Total votes		4,564	100%
