= William G. Whiteley =

American politician and judge

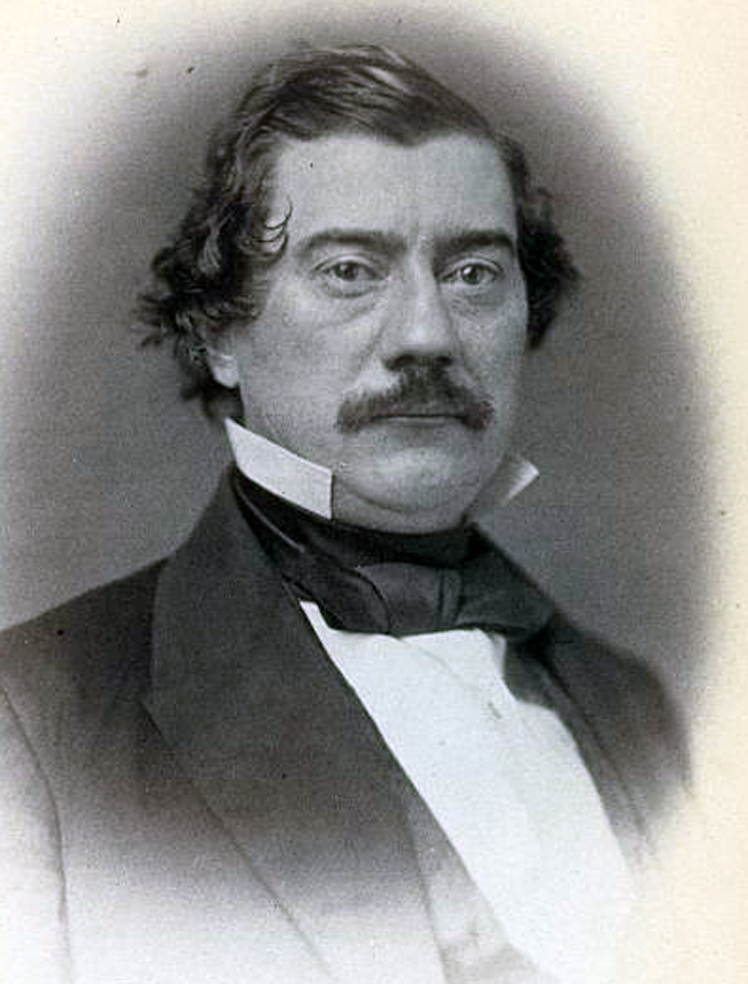
- Portrait by Julian Vannerson, 1859

Member of the U.S. House of Representatives from Delaware's at-large district
- In office March 4, 1857 – March 3, 1861
- Preceded by: Elisha D. Cullen
- Succeeded by: George P. Fisher

20th Mayor of Wilmington, Delaware
- In office 1875–1878
- Preceded by: Joshua Simms
- Succeeded by: John P. Allmond

Personal details
- Born: William Gustavia Whitley; August 7, 1819 Newark, Delaware, U.S.
- Died: April 23, 1886 (aged 66) Wilmington, Delaware, U.S.
- Resting place: Old Broad Street Presbyterian Church Cemetery at Bridgeton, New Jersey
- Party: Democratic
- Education: Princeton College
- Profession: Lawyer

William Gustavus Whiteley (August 7, 1819 – April 23, 1886) was an American lawyer and politician from Wilmington, in New Castle County, Delaware. He was a member of the Democratic Party, who served in the Delaware General Assembly and as U.S. Representative from Delaware, Mayor of Wilmington, and Associate Judge of the Superior Court of Delaware.

== Early life and family ==
Whiteley was born near Newark, Delaware, to Henry and Catherine Whiteley.

William attended Bullock's School at Wilmington and graduated from Princeton College in 1838. He studied law under James A. Bayard Jr., was admitted to the Delaware Bar in 1841, and began a practice in Wilmington.

== Professional and political career ==
He was the prothonotary of New Castle County from 1852 to 1856.

=== Congress ===
He was elected as a Democrat to the 35th and 36th Congresses, serving from March 4, 1857, to March 3, 1861. While in Congress he was chairman of the Committee on Agriculture in the 35th Congress. He was not a candidate for renomination in 1860.

=== Later career ===
He resumed his occupation as prothonotary of New Castle County from 1862 to 1867.

Whiteley was mayor of Wilmington from 1875 to 1878 and was a member of a commission to settle fishery disputes between New Jersey and Delaware in 1877. He was census enumerator for Delaware in 1880, and was appointed as associate judge of the Delaware Superior Court from March 31, 1884, until his death.

== Death and burial ==
Whiteley died at Wilmington and is buried in the Old Broad Street Presbyterian Church Cemetery at Bridgeton, New Jersey.

== Almanac ==
Elections are held the first Tuesday after November 1. U.S. Representatives took office March 4 and have a two-year term.

Public offices
Office	Type	Location	Began office	Ended office	Notes
U.S. Representative	Legislature	Washington	March 4, 1857	March 3, 1861	
Mayor of Wilmington	Executive	Wilmington	1875	1878	
Associate Justice	Judiciary	Dover	March 31, 1884	April 23, 1886	Superior Court

United States Congressional service
Dates	Congress	Chamber	Majority	President	Committees	Class/District
1857–1859	35th	U.S. House	Democratic	James Buchanan		at-large
1859–1861	36th	U.S. House	Democratic	James Buchanan		at-large

Election results
Year	Office	Subject	Party	votes	%	Opponent	Party	votes	%
1856	U.S. Representative	William G. Whiteley	Democratic	8,111	56%	Elisha D. Cullen	American	6,360	44%
1858	U.S. Representative	William G. Whiteley	Democratic	7,868	51%	William R. Morris	American	7,452	49%

== Places with more information ==
- Delaware Historical Society; website; 505 North Market Street, Wilmington, Delaware 19801; (302) 655-7161.
- University of Delaware; Library website; 181 South College Avenue, Newark, Delaware 19717; (302) 831-2965.

== Notes ==
U.S. House of Representatives
Preceded by Elisha D. Cullen	Member of the U.S. House of Representatives from Delaware's at-large congressional district 1857–1861	Succeeded by George P. Fisher
