= 1964 United States House of Representatives election in Delaware =

- November 3, 1964
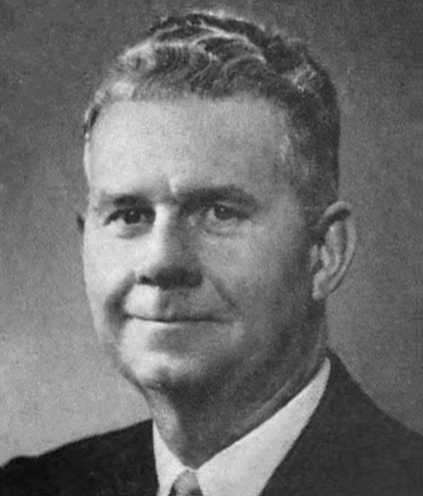

Nominee	Harris McDowell	James H. Snowden
Party	Democratic	Republican
Popular vote	112,361	86,254
Percentage	56.6%	43.4%
- County results McDowell: 50–60%
U.S. Representative before election
Harris McDowell
Democratic
Elected U.S. Representative
Harris McDowell
Democratic

The 1964 United States House of Representatives election in Delaware took place on November 3, 1964. Incumbent representative, Harris McDowell won re-election to a fifth term with 56.55 percent of the vote against Republican candidate, James Snowden who got 43.41 percent. This would be the last time a Democrat would win Delaware's at-large congressional district until 1982.

== Results ==
General election results
Party	Candidate	Votes	%	±%
Democratic	Harris McDowell (Incumbent)	112,361	56.55%	▲3.6
Republican	James H. Snowden	86,254	43.41%	▼3.5
Socialist Labor	La Forest	256	0.04%	▼0.1
Total votes		198,871	100.00%	
Democratic hold				
