= 1968 United States House of Representatives election in Delaware =

- November 5, 1968
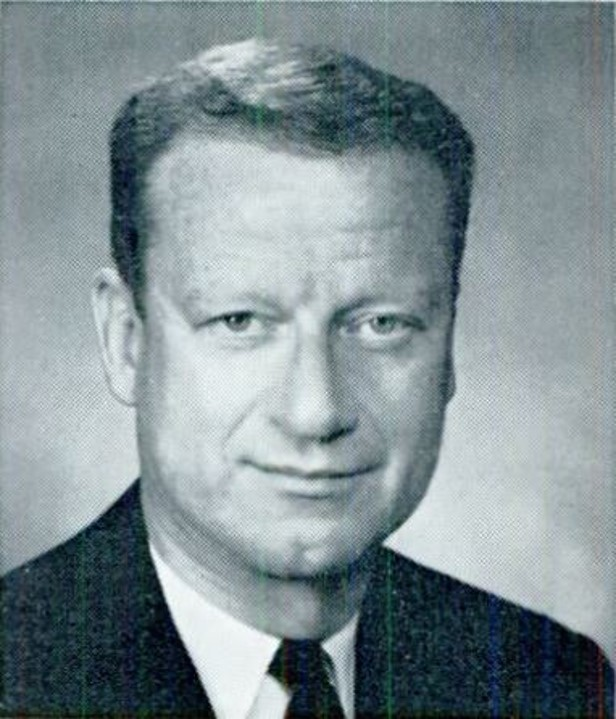

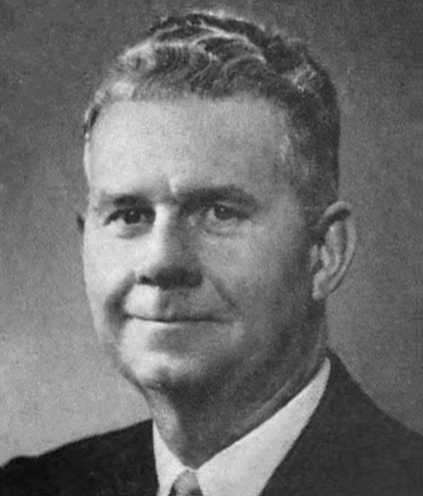
Nominee	William Roth	Harris McDowell
Party	Republican	Democratic
Popular vote	117,827	82,993
Percentage	58.67%	41.33%
- Roth: 50–60% 60–70% 70–80% McDowell: 50–60% 60–70% 70–80%
U.S. Representative before election
William Roth
Republican
Elected U.S. Representative
William Roth
Republican

The 1968 United States House of Representatives election in Delaware took place on November 5, 1968. Incumbent Republican William Roth was challenged by Democrat Harris McDowell whom he had previously unseated in 1966. Roth won re-election by 17 points.

Roth ran for the Republican nomination unopposed, while McDowell saw challenge from Democrats.

== Background ==
McDowell had previously represented Delaware's at-large congressional district from 1959 through 1967 before being defeated in 1966 by Roth.

== Candidates and primaries ==
- William Roth (Republican), incumbent representative seeking a second term
- Harris McDowell (Democrat), former representative of the seat

=== Democratic primary ===
- Harris McDowell, former representative of the seat
- Sam Shipley, director of the State Development Department, eliminated in primary
- Robert Kelly, declined to run

McDowell's decision to run again was met with push back from his fellow Democrats. Delaware Governor Charles L. Terry Jr. had endorsed Robert Kelly, however Kelly declined to run. Terry later endorsed Sam Shipley. Shipley was seen as a better candidate due to being significantly younger than McDowell, as McDowell's age was considered a factor in his loss against Roth.

== Election ==
=== Results ===
On November 5, 1968, Roth defeated McDowell a second time with over 17 percent of the vote, an improvement on his 11 percent victory in the previous election. For the second election in a row Roth won all three of Delaware's counties. Roth's victory set records for the largest votes cast for a Delaware House of Representatives candidate and the biggest majority for one.

Roth attributed his victory to his bipartisan work and his creation of the "Roth Catalog" (later the Catalog of Federal Domestic Assistance) a government issued catalogue of federal agencies. Following his victory Roth went on a "thank you" campaign and revisited all his campaign locations to thank supporters.

General election results
Party	Candidate	Votes	%	±%
Republican	William Roth	117,827	58.67%	▲2.9
Democratic	Harris McDowell	82,993	41.33%	▼2.9
Total votes		200,820	100.00%	
Republican hold				

== Aftermath ==
Midway through his second term, Roth resigned from the House to fill a vacant Senate seat. He was succeeded by state representative Republican Pete du Pont. During McDowell's concession speech he stated that he did not regret running, and that he had understood his chance of victory was small. Following the loss McDowell retired from politics after 35 years. The loss was McDowell's third defeat out of eight campaigns.
