= 2006 United States House of Representatives election in Delaware =

- November 7, 2006
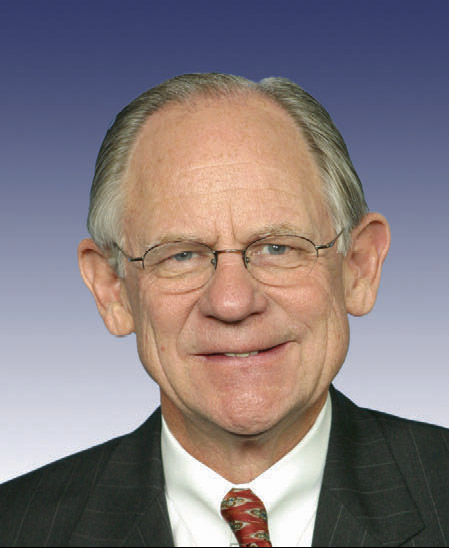

Nominee	Mike Castle	Dennis Spivack
Party	Republican	Democratic
Popular vote	143,897	97,565
Percentage	57.17%	38.76%
- Castle: 40–50% 50–60% 60–70% Spivack: 40–50% 50–60% 60–70%
U.S. Representative before election
Mike Castle
Republican
Elected U.S. Representative
Mike Castle
Republican

The 2006 United States House of Representatives election in Delaware was held on November 7, 2006. Incumbent Republican U.S. Representative Mike Castle won re-election to a seventh term.

== Democratic primary ==
=== Candidates ===
- Karen M. Hartley-Nagle, non-profit organization director
- Dennis Spivack, attorney

Democratic Party primary results
Party	Candidate	Votes	%
Democratic	Dennis Spivack	9,515	60.34
Democratic	Karen M. Hartley-Nagle	6,253	39.66
Total votes		15,768	100.00

== Republican primary ==
- Michael N. Castle, incumbent U.S. Congressman

Congressman Castle faced no opposition in the Republican Party primary.

== Green Party ==
- Michael Berg, retired teacher and anti-war activist

== Independent ==
- Karen M. Hartley-Nagle, formerly of the Democratic Party

== General election ==
=== Predictions ===
Source	Ranking	As of
The Cook Political Report	Safe R	November 6, 2006
Rothenberg	Safe R	November 6, 2006
Sabato's Crystal Ball	Safe R	November 6, 2006
Real Clear Politics	Safe R	November 7, 2006
CQ Politics	Safe R	November 7, 2006

=== Results ===
2006 Delaware's at-large congressional district election
Party	Candidate	Votes	%
Republican	Mike Castle (incumbent)	143,897	57.17
Democratic	Dennis Spivack	97,565	38.76
Independent Party	Karen M. Hartley-Nagle	5,769	2.29
Green	Michael Berg	4,463	1.77
Total votes		251,694	100.00
Republican hold			

==== By county ====
County	Mike Castle Republican		Dennis Spivack Democratic		All Others	
County	#	%	#	%	#	%
New Castle	84,129	53.3%	67,555	42.8%	6,205	4.0%
Kent	23,658	62.4%	12,493	32.9%	1,789	4.7%
Sussex	36,110	64.6%	17,517	31.4%	2,238	4.0%
Totals	143,897	57.2%	97,565	38.8%	10,232	4.1%
