= George B. Rodney =

American politician

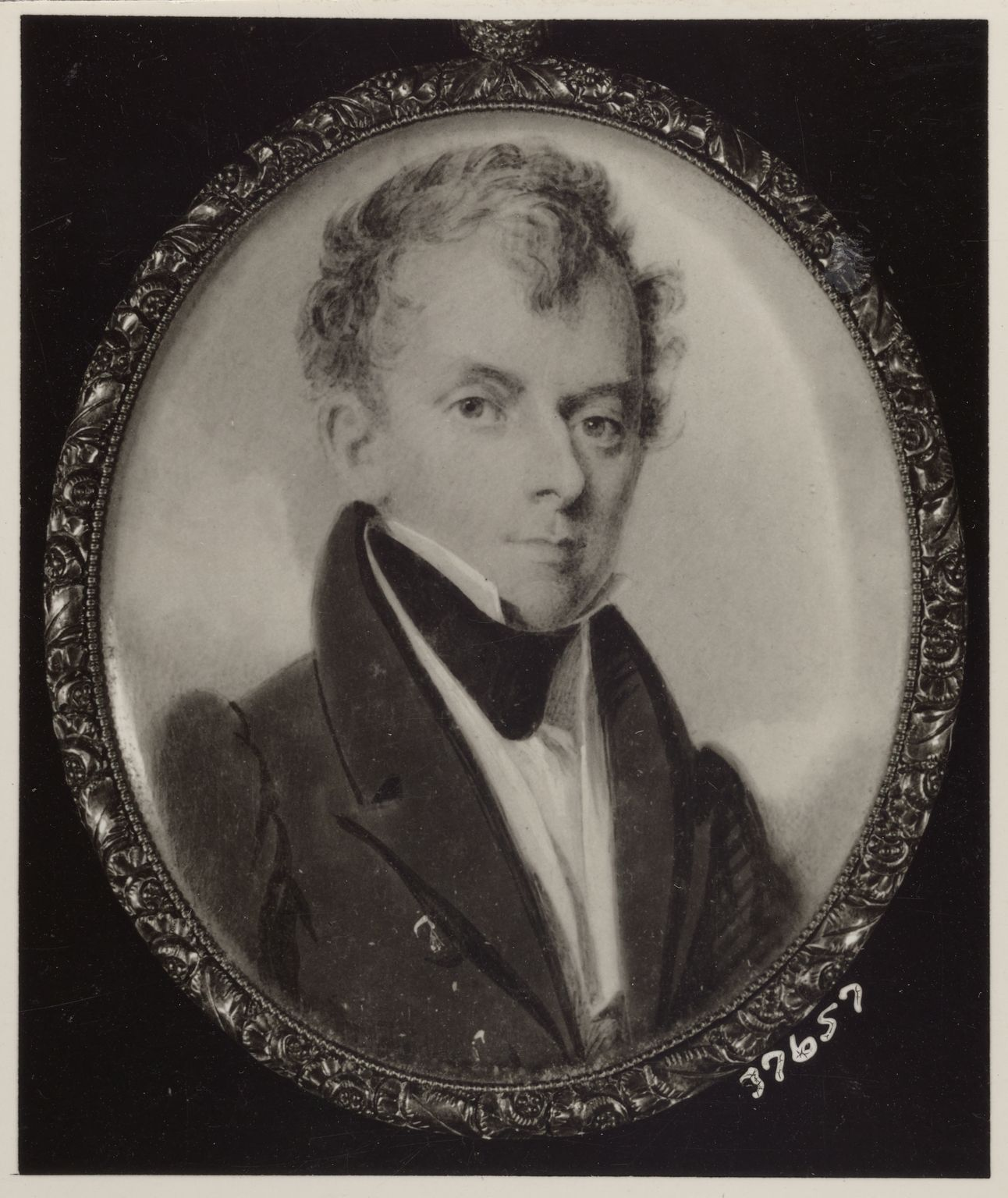

Member of the U.S. House of Representatives from Delaware's at-large district
- In office March 4, 1841 – March 3, 1845
- Preceded by: Thomas Robinson Jr.
- Succeeded by: John W. Houston

Personal details
- Born: April 2, 1803 Lewes, Delaware, U.S.
- Died: June 18, 1883 (aged 80) New Castle, Delaware, U.S.
- Party: Whig
- Education: Princeton College
- Profession: Lawyer

George Brydges Rodney (April 2, 1803 – June 18, 1883) was an American lawyer and politician from New Castle, in New Castle County, Delaware. He was a member of the Whig Party, and served as U.S. Representative from Delaware.

== Early life and family ==
Rodney was born April 2, 1803, in Lewes, Delaware, son of Governor Daniel Rodney and Sarah Fisher. He graduated from Princeton College in 1820, studied law and was admitted to the Delaware Bar in 1828, and began practice in New Castle County, Delaware.

His son, George B. Rodney Jr., served as governor of Alaska for four months in 1874.

== Political career ==
Rodney served as Register in Chancery and Clerk of the Orphans’ Court of Sussex County from 1826 until 1830. He was elected as a Whig and served four years representing Delaware in the U.S. House of Representatives in the 27th and 28th congresses, from March 4, 1841, until March 3, 1845, during the administrations of U.S. presidents William Henry Harrison and John Tyler. Following his retirement he resumed the practice of law and served as a delegate to the peace convention held in Washington, D.C., in 1861 in an effort to prevent the impending American Civil War.

== Death and legacy ==
Rodney died at New Castle and is buried there in the Immanuel Episcopal Church Cemetery.

== Almanac ==
Elections are held the first Tuesday after November 1. U.S. representatives took office March 4 and have a two-year term.

Public offices
Office	Type	Location	Began office	Ended office	Notes
U.S. Representative	Legislature	Washington	March 4, 1841	March 3, 1843	
U.S. Representative	Legislature	Washington	March 4, 1843	March 3, 1845	

United States Congressional service
Dates	Congress	Chamber	Majority	President	Committees	Class/District
1841–1843	27th	U.S. House	Whig	William Henry Harrison; John Tyler		at-large
1843–1845	28th	U.S. House	Democratic	John Tyler		at-large

Election results
Year	Office	Subject	Party	votes	%	Opponent	Party	votes	%
1840	U.S. Representative	George B. Rodney	Whig	5,896	54%	Thomas Robinson Jr.	Democratic	4,974	46%
1842	U.S. Representative	George B. Rodney	Whig	5,465	50%	William H. Jones	Democratic	5,456	50%

== Places with more information ==
- Delaware Historical Society; website; 505 North Market Street, Wilmington, Delaware 19801; (302) 655-7161.
- University of Delaware; Library website; 181 South College Avenue, Newark, Delaware 19717; (302) 831-2965.

U.S. House of Representatives
Preceded by Thomas Robinson Jr.	Member of the U.S. House of Representatives from Delaware's at-large congressional district 1841–1845	Succeeded by John W. Houston
