= James A. Bayard Jr. =

American politician (1799–1880)

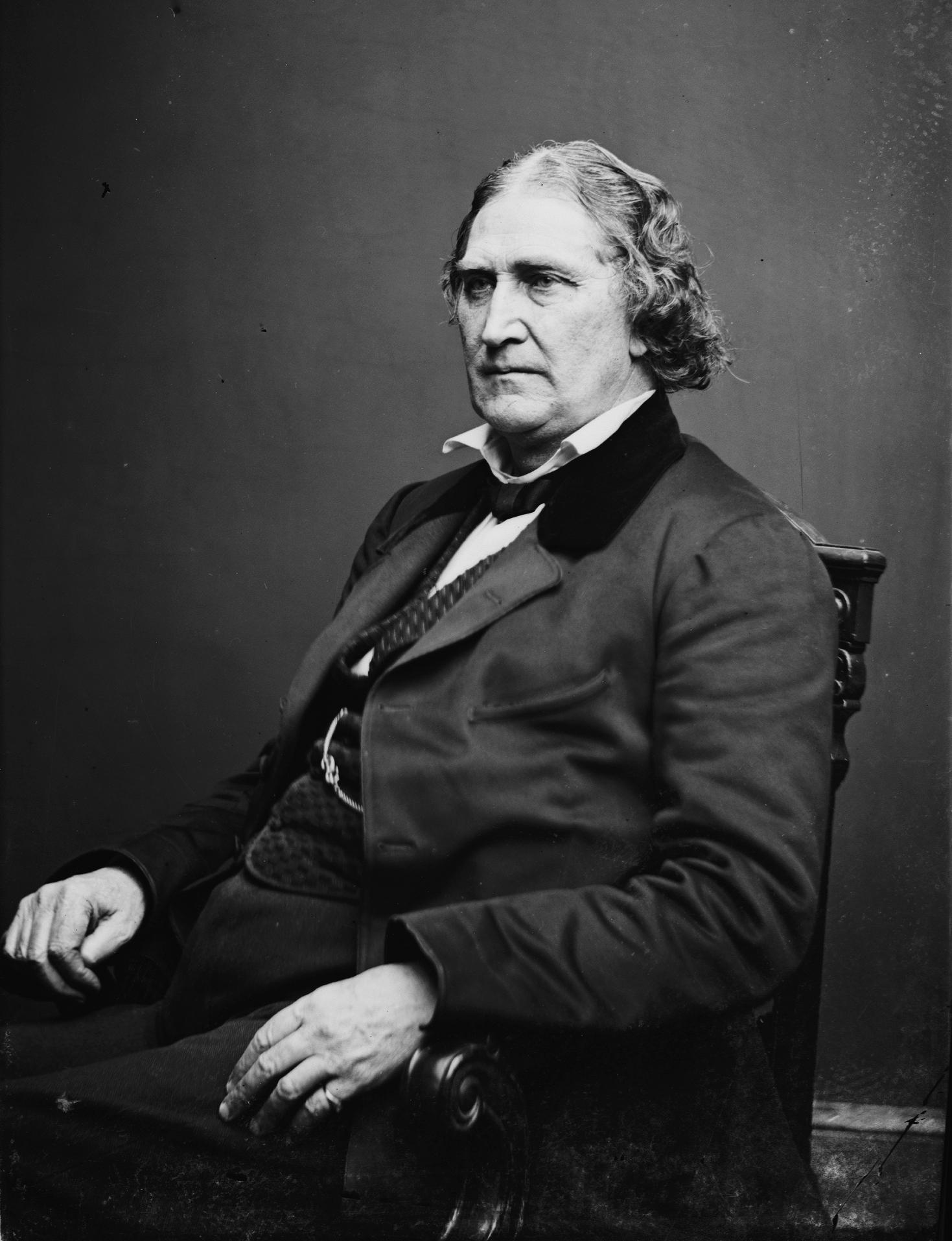
- Bayard c. 1860–65

United States Senator from Delaware
- In office March 4, 1851 – January 29, 1864
- Preceded by: John Wales
- Succeeded by: George R. Riddle
- In office April 5, 1867 – March 3, 1869
- Preceded by: George R. Riddle
- Succeeded by: Thomas F. Bayard Sr.

Personal details
- Born: James Asheton Bayard Jr. November 15, 1799 Wilmington, Delaware, U.S.
- Died: June 13, 1880 (aged 80) Wilmington, Delaware, U.S.
- Party: Democratic
- Spouse: Anne Francis (m. 1823; died 1864)
- Relations: Richard H. Bayard (brother); Richard Bassett (grandfather)
- Children: 7, including Thomas
- Parent(s): James A. Bayard; Nancy Bassett Bayard
- Occupation: Politician; lawyer

James Asheton Bayard Jr. (November 15, 1799 – June 13, 1880) was an American lawyer and politician from Delaware. He was a member of the Democratic Party and served as U.S. Senator from Delaware.

== Early life ==
Bayard was born in Wilmington, Delaware, on November 15, 1799. He was a son of Nancy (née Bassett) Bayard and James A. Bayard, a member of the Federalist Party who served as U.S. Representative and U.S. Senator from Delaware. His older siblings included brother Richard H. Bayard, also a U.S. Senator from Delaware, and Ann Caroline Bayard, who operated the Bayard family's ironworks, Victoria Furnace, with their brother Henry Milligan Bayard.

His paternal grandparents were Dr. James Asheton Bayard and Ann (née Hodge) Bayard. The Bayard family was descended from a sister of Director-General Petrus Stuyvesant and came to Bohemia Manor, Cecil County, Maryland, in 1698. His maternal grandfather was Richard Bassett, a signatory to the United States Constitution and U.S. Senator from Delaware.

== Career ==
Bayard studied the law, and began his legal practice in the city of Wilmington. From 1836 until 1843 he served as United States Attorney for Delaware. In 1851 he was elected to the U.S. Senate. He was re-elected in 1857 and 1863, and served from March 4, 1851, to January 29, 1864, when he resigned. As U.S. Senator he was chairman of the Committee on Engrossed Bills in the 32nd Congress, a member of the Committee on Public Buildings in the 33rd Congress and 34th Congress, a member of the Committee on Judiciary in the 35th Congress and 36th Congress, and a member of the Committee on Public Buildings and Grounds in the 35th Congress.

Bayard served on the boards of various railroads, including the Wilmington and Susquehanna Railroad, the Philadelphia, Wilmington and Baltimore Railroad (for which service he is named on the 1839 Newkirk Viaduct Monument), and the Pennsylvania Railroad.

In 1846, Bayard represented slave owners in a civil suit against Thomas Garrett, a Wilmington iron merchant who was also a "stationmaster" on the Underground Railroad. The plaintiffs demanded damages from Garrett for helping around 10 slaves escape to freedom. The suit was tried in the U.S. District Court in New Castle, Delaware, before Chief Justice of the Supreme Court Roger B. Taney (sitting as a circuit judge). (Taney later issued the notorious Dred Scott decision as Chief Justice.) Bayard won a judgement that all but bankrupted Garrett, who declared on the spot that he would redouble his anti-slavery efforts: "Friend, I haven't a dollar in the world, but if thee knows a fugitive who needs a breakfast, send him to me".

Bayard was a conservative and adhered to his interpretation of tradition throughout the American Civil War. He believed the South should be allowed to secede peacefully, and privately hoped for the secession of Delaware and a state convention to address the issue. Citing property rights of owners, he opposed abolitionist measures. He also stated both his opposition to the Civil War and his opposition to any presidential or congressional acts used to suppress the independence of the Southern states.

Bayard's consistently pro-Southern position during the Civil War made him the target of frequent criticism from Republicans in Delaware and across the nation. In 1864, the Senate required all senators to swear an oath of loyalty to the Union. Bayard protested, stating that such an oath would be unconstitutional, and after taking the oath and giving a long speech disputing its legality, he resigned from the Senate.

George R. Riddle was appointed to take Bayard's Senate seat, but Riddle died in office on March 29, 1867, leaving the position vacant. Bayard interrupted his practice of law in Wilmington and accepted appointment to the vacant seat. He was subsequently elected to fill it, and served again from April 5, 1867, to March 3, 1869. During the impeachment trial of President Andrew Johnson, Bayard voted "not guilty." After declining to run again for re-election, he returned to private practice for several years until poor health incapacitated him.

In 1872, he was among the nine politicians whose names were submitted by the House of Representatives to the Senate for investigation in the Credit Mobilier scandal. He wrote a letter disavowing any knowledge of the affair, and his name was generally dropped from the investigation.

== Personal life ==
Coat of Arms of James A. Bayard, Jr.

On July 8, 1823, Bayard was married to Anne Francis (1802–1864) by the Right Rev. Bishop William White. Anne was the daughter of Thomas Willing Francis and Dorothy (née Willing) Francis and granddaughter of Thomas Willing, the first president of First Bank of the United States. Anne's elder sister, Elizabeth Francis, was the second wife of their cousin, U.S. Senator from Rhode Island, John Brown Francis. Together, they were the parents of:

- James Asheton Bayard (1825–1848), who died unmarried.
- Mary Ellen Bayard (1827–1845), who married Augustus Van Courtlandt Schermerhorn (1812–1846), son of Abraham Schermerhorn.
- Thomas Francis Bayard (1828–1898), a U.S. Senator who married Louise Lee, daughter of Josiah Lee and Elouise Sewell. After her death, he married Mary Willing Clymer, the granddaughter and namesake of the Philadelphia socialite Mary Willing Clymer.
- Charles Carroll Bayard (1829–1850), who died from a wound received during the eruption of Mount Vesuvius on February 9, 1850.
- George Harrison Bayard (1832–1836), who died in childhood.
- Mabel Bayard (1838–1897), who married Dr. John Kintzing Kane Jr. (1833–1886), son of Judge John K. Kane, in 1863. After his death, she married Levi Clark Bird (1842–1902).
- Florence Bayard (1842–1898), who married Benoni Lockwood IV (1834–1909).

His wife died on March 11, 1864. Bayard died at Wilmington on June 13, 1880, and is buried there in the Old Swedes Episcopal Church Cemetery.

=== Descendants ===
Through his son Thomas, he was a grandfather of U.S. Senator Thomas F. Bayard Jr., who married Elizabeth Bradford du Pont, and was the father of five, including Alexis I. du Pont Bayard, the Lieutenant Governor of Delaware from 1949 to 1953.

== Almanac ==
Senators were elected by the state legislature at this time – in this case the Delaware General Assembly – to a six-year term beginning March 4. Bayard was elected to a term beginning March 4, 1863, but resigned in 1864. George R. Riddle was appointed to serve the rest of the term, but died in 1867. Bayard was then appointed to serve the remainder of the term.

Public offices
Office	Type	Location	Began office	Ended office	Notes
United States Attorney	Executive	Wilmington, Delaware	1836	1843	
U.S. Senator	Legislature	Washington	March 4, 1851	March 3, 1857	
U.S. Senator	Legislature	Washington	March 4, 1857	March 3, 1863	
U.S. Senator	Legislature	Washington	March 4, 1863	January 29, 1864	
U.S. Senator	Legislature	Washington	April 5, 1867	March 3, 1869	

United States congressional service
Dates	Congress	Chamber	Majority	President	Committees	Class/District
1851–1853	32nd	U.S. Senate	Democratic	Millard Fillmore		class 1
1853–1855	33rd	U.S. Senate	Democratic	Franklin Pierce		class 1
1855–1857	34th	U.S. Senate	Democratic	Franklin Pierce		class 1
1857–1859	35th	U.S. Senate	Democratic	James Buchanan		class 1
1859–1861	36th	U.S. Senate	Democratic	James Buchanan		class 1
1861–1863	37th	U.S. Senate	Republican	Abraham Lincoln		class 1
1863–1865	38th	U.S. Senate	Republican	Abraham Lincoln		class 1 (Note: Resigned.)
1867–1869	40th	U.S. Senate	Republican	Andrew Johnson		class 1 (Note: Elected to fill vacancy caused by George R. Riddle's death.)

U.S. Senate
Preceded by John Wales	U.S. senator (Class 1) from Delaware; March 4, 1851 – January 29, 1864; Served alongside: Presley Spruance, John M. Clayton, Joseph P. Comegys, Martin W. Bates, Willard Saulsbury Sr.	Succeeded by George R. Riddle
Preceded by George R. Riddle	U.S. senator (Class 1) from Delaware; April 5, 1867 – March 3, 1869; Served alongside: Willard Saulsbury Sr.	Succeeded by Thomas F. Bayard
