= Hall of Fame of Delaware Women =

The Hall of Fame of Delaware Women was established in 1981 by the Delaware Commission for Women, a division of the Secretary of State of Delaware. The hall of fame recognizes the achievements and contributions of Delaware women in a variety of fields and includes activists, artists, athletes, military personnel and scientists.

The Delaware Commission for Women is a state agency with members appointed by the governor representing Wilmington and each of Delaware's three counties (New Castle, Kent and Sussex). In making its selections for the Hall of Fame, the commission prioritizes civil rights, economic empowerment, violence prevention, women's health, work, family, recognition and celebration. Eligible women must have been born in Delaware or resided in the state for a minimum of ten years.

== Inductees ==
Delaware Women's Hall of Fame
Name	Image	Birth–death	Year	Area of achievement	Ref(s)
Patricia Dailey Lewis			2023	CEO, Beau Biden Foundation	
Bonnie Meszaros			2023	Economics	
Paulette Sullivan Moore		(1951–)	2023	Delaware's first African American female attorney	
Leslie Newman			2023	Chair, Delaware Community Foundation's COVID-19 grant award committee	
Lynn Snyder-Mackler			2023	Physical therapist, sports medicine researcher	
Anne Canby			2022	Head of the Delaware and New Jersey Departments of Transportation, treasurer of the Massachusetts Bay Transportation Authority, deputy assistant secretary of the U.S. Department of Transportation	
Alice Dunbar Nelson		(1875–1935)	2022	Poet, novelist, journalist, educator	
Carolyn Fredricks		(1947–)	2022	Executive director, Modern Maturity Center	
Teri Quinn Gray			2022	Chief operating officer at Provivi, Inc.	
Ilona Holland		(1950–)	2022	Author, educator	
Karyl Rattay			2022	Director of the Delaware Division of Public Health	
Aida Waserstein		(1948–)	2022	Author, retired Delaware Family Court judge	
Fayetta M. Blake			2021	Executive director of Pathways to Success, Inc.	
Stephanie Bolden		(1946–)	2021	Representative, Delaware General Assembly	
Jennifer Cohan			2021	Secretary of Delaware Department of Transportation	
Marianne Blackburn "Mimi" Drew		(1946–)	2021	Retired rear admiral, United States Navy	
Ann Jaffe		(1931–2024)	2021	Holocaust survivor; chairperson of Speakers' Bureau of Delaware's Halina Wind Preston Holocaust Education Committee	
Valerie Longhurst		(1963–)	2021	Representative, Delaware General Assembly	
Mary Seward Phillips Eskridge		(1883–1967)	2020	Democratic National Committee Woman of Delaware, treasurer of Delaware League of Women Voters	
Margaret Burton White Houston		(1864–1937)	2020	Suffragist who established the Georgetown, Delaware library	
Tania M. Culley		(1968–)	2019	First child advocate for the State of Delaware	
Drewry N. Fennell		(1960–)	2019	Human rights, LGBTQ equality	
Jan R. Jurden			2019	First female president judge of the Superior Court of Delaware	
Maria Matos		(1950–)	2019	President and CEO of the Latin American Community Center	
Blanche Stubbs		(1872–1952)	2019	Civil rights activist, suffragette	
Marie Swajeski		(1926–)	2019	Founder of the Delaware Children's Theatre	
Jill Biden		(1951–)	2018	Former First Lady of the United States (2021–2024) Second Lady of the United States 2009–2017; founder of non-profit Biden Breast Health Initiative	
Lisa Blunt Rochester		(1962–)	2018	U.S. representative for Delaware's at-large congressional district	
Reba Ross Hollingsworth		(1926–)	2018	Civic leader	
Deborah Wicks		(1946–)	2018	Retired superintendent of the Smyrna School District	
Carolyn Berger			2017	Delaware Supreme Court justice	
Debra Heffernan		(1962–)	2017	State representative	
Janice Nevin			2017	President and CEO of Christiana Health Care System	
Kendall M. Wilson		(1930/31–2006)	2017	First executive director of American Civil Liberties Union of Delaware	
Annie Norman			2016	Established the statewide Delaware Library Catalog	
Chandra G. Pitts			2016	Founder & CEO of One Village Alliance; creator of "Girls Can Do Anything!"	
Sonia S. Sloan		(1928–2019)	2016	Raised over $100 million for Delaware non-profit agencies, and a reformation of program for youth released from Ferris School	
Jamie L. Wolfe		(1966–2018)	2016	Advocate for persons with disabilities	
Kim L. Allen			2015	Educator who works with at-risk youth	
Darlene Battle			2015	Social activist	
Sandra L. Ben			2015	Pastor and community organizer	
Rita M. Landgraf			2015	Secretary of the Department of Health and Social Services	
Ileana M. Smith			2015	Vice president and campus director for the Delaware Technical Community College's Owens Campus	
Stephanie Louise Kwolek		(1923–2014)	2014	Inventor of Kevlar	
Catherine Devaney McKay			2014	Founder of Connections Community Support Programs	
Patricia H. Purcell			2014	First African American pediatrician in Delaware	
Latricia Odette Wright			2014	Nanticoke elder and educator	
Beatrice "Bebe" Coker		(1935–)	2013	Public education and literacy advocate	
Patricia Maichle		(1958–)	2013	Executive director of the Delaware Developmental Disabilities Council	
Wilma Mishoe		(1949–)	2013	Dean at Delaware Technical & Community College	
Jane Richards Roth		(1935–)	2013	Federal judge on the United States Court of Appeals for the Third Circuit	
Vicky Cooke			2012	Executive director of the Delaware Breast Cancer Coalition	
Micki Edelsohn			2012	Founder of the Homes for Life Foundation, a non-profit providing housing for people with intellectual and developmental disabilities	
Vivian Rapposelli			2012	Secretary of the Department of Services for Children, Youth and Their Families	
Frances West			2012	Treasurer of the National Consumers League, Delaware's first woman director of Consumer Affairs, former president of Delaware's Better Business Bureau and Delaware Highway commissioner	
Neda P. Biggs		(1951–)	2011	Immigration attorney	
Imogene F. Chandler		(1934–2021)	2011	Supporter of early childhood education programs	
Susan C. Del Pesco		(1946–)	2011	First woman elected as president of the Delaware Bar Association; first woman appointed to the Delaware Superior Court	
Audrey K. Doberstein		(1932–)	2011	Former president of Wilmington University	
Moonyeen L. Klopfenstein		(1942–)	2011	Childbirth educator	
Sister Ascension Banegas		(1931–2019)	2010	Advocate for immigrants, co-founder of La Esperanza Community Center in Georgetown	
Jeanette Eckman		(1882–1972)	2010	Political leader, historian and editor	
Kathryn Young Hazeur		(1923–2011)	2010	First African American to earn a graduate degree from the University of Delaware, in 1951	
Jacquelin Pitts			2010	Lacrosse player and coach; led the U.S. Women's Lacrosse Team to their first World Championship	
Beverly Louise Stewart			2010	Educator and founder of the Back to Basics tutoring business	
Judith Gedney Tobin		(1927–2021)	2010	Pioneer in forensic pathology, performed over 5000 autopsies	
Theresa L.I. del Tufo			2009	Established three centers for displaced homemakers	
Sally V. Hawkins		(1922–2017)	2009	Radio journalist at WILM	
Lynn W. Williams			2009	Conservationist and founder of the Delaware Nature Society; rescued the Brandywine Creek State Park from development	
Elizabeth Empson Battell		(d.)	2008	Delaware's "godmother," ran the Golden Fleece Tavern 1777–1792	
Renee Palmore Beaman		(1960–)	2008	Created the Bethel AIDS Task Force in 1994 with six other women	
Grace Pierce Beck		(1926–2008)	2008	Leading Delaware environmentalist	
Uma Chowdhry		(1947–2024)	2008	Research scientist at DuPont who specialized in ceramic materials, including catalysts, proton conductors, superconductors and ceramic packaging for microelectronics	
Christine Margaret McDermott		(1947–2007)	2008	Attorney who fought domestic violence; first woman to be executive director of Delaware Volunteer Legal Services	
Evelyn Dickenson Swensson		(1928–)	2008	Conductor, composer, lyricist, pianist, singer, playwright and musical lecturer	
Sujata Kumari Bhatia		(1978–)	2007	Professor of Chemical, Biomolecular, and Biomedical Engineering at University of Delaware	
Carolyn S. Burger		(1940–)	2007	First woman in the US to head a telecommunications company; CEO of Bell Atlantic-Delaware	
Liane McDowell Sorenson		(1947–)	2007	Director of Women's Affairs at the University of Delaware, member of the Delaware House of Representatives and minority whip	
Shirley M. Tarrant		(1935–2003)	2007	Founder and president of the Suburban County Hospital Task Force	
Valerie Whiting		(1972–)	2007	Professional basketball player	
M. Jane Brady		(1951–)	2006	42nd Delaware attorney general	
Felicia A. Dorman		(1976–)	2006	Volunteerism	
Lolita A. Lopez		(1953–)	2006	President and CEO of YWCA Delaware	
Betsy Rawls		(1928–2023)	2006	Professional golfer	
Loretta F. Walsh		(1949–2022)	2006	Wilmington, Delaware city council member	
Muriel E. Gilman		(1923–2011)	2005	Executive with the United Way of Delaware	
Patricia W. Griffin		(1957–)	2005	State court administrator in the Delaware Administrative Office	
Teresa Haman		(1953–)	2005	Painter	
Valerie A. Woodruff		(1944–)	2005	Delaware secretary of education	
Patricia M. Blevins		(1954–)	2004	Majority leader of the Delaware Senate	
Linda L. Chick		(1943–2022)	2004	Chair of the Youth Philanthropy Board Advisory Committee for the Delaware Community Foundation	
Carol A. Timmons		(1958–2020)	2004	Brigadier general of the Delaware Air National Guard	
Edith P. Vincent		(1922–2013)	2004	School nurse and advocate for children's health	
Joy Ann Bartell		(1951–)	2003	Beebe School of Nursing instructor	
Sister Jeanne Cashman		(1943–)	2003	Founder of Sojourner's Place	
Margaret Rose Henry		(1944–)	2003	Member of the Delaware Senate, majority whip	
Sister Ann Marguerite Gildea		(1919–2005)	2002	Founder of the Mary Mother of Hope House	
Gloria Wernicki Homer			2002	Chief administrative officer of Governor Executive Office	
Jeanne D. Nutter		(1947–)	2002	Compiled Growing Up Black in New Castle County	
Mary Sam Ward		(1911–2000)	2002	Author, educator and historian; 1979 Delaware Mother of the Year; co-founder of the Delaware Press Women in 1977	
Myrna L. Bair		(1940–2024)	2001	Member of the Delaware Senate, policy advisor and assistant professor, Public Management Faculty, Institute for Public Administration, University of Delaware	
Anna Janney De Armond		(1910–2008)	2001	First woman to become a full professor at the University of Delaware	
Marian L. Harris		(1936–)	2001	Founder and volunteer executive director of The House of Pride	
Lucile Petry Leone		(1902–1999)	2001	Nurse, founding director of the Cadet Nurse Corps in 1943	
Martha G. Bachman		(1924–1998)	2000	Chair of the Delaware State Advisory Council on Vocational Education	
Alice Marie Smith Coleman		(1944–)	2000	Therapist and volunteer	
Emily G. Morris		(1934–2001)	2000	First African American elected to county office in Delaware	
Helen R. Thomas		(1921–2022)	2000	Women's rights activist	
Grace Ruth Batten		(1943–)	1999	First African American woman mayor in Sussex County	
Evelyn P. Burkle		(1927–2015)	1999	Breast cancer survivor and educator	
Lynne S. Frink		(1946–1998)	1999	Environmentalist; founded Tri-State Bird Rescue & Research	
Barbara Chase Herr		(1921–2017)	1999	First director of commission for women	
Nancy W. Cook		(1936–)	1998	Member of the Delaware Senate	
Henrietta R. Johnson		(1914–1997)	1998	First African American woman elected to the Delaware General Assembly	
Renee G. O'Leary			1998	Early childhood science teacher	
Beatrice "Bea" Simonds		(1914–2006)	1998	Advocate for the visually impaired	
Mary Ann Shadd Cary		(1823–1893)	1997	Anti-slavery activist, journalist, publisher, teacher and lawyer; first black woman publisher in North America and the first woman publisher in Canada	
Sherry L. Freebery			1997	Police chief and chief administrative officer	
Karen E. Peterson		(1950–)	1997	Member of the Delaware Senate	
Harriet N. Smith Windsor		(1940–)	1997	First woman from Sussex County to be appointed secretary of state	
Cynthia M. Boehmer		(1947–)	1996	Domestic Violence Coordinating Council member	
Julie K. Boozer		(1935–)	1996	Chair of the Division of Nursing at Wesley College	
Sally J. Knox		(1925–1995)	1996	Headed the Delaware Commission for Women; pay equity advocate	
Jane P. Maroney		(1923–2021)	1996	Member of the Delaware House of Representatives	
Mae Riedy Carter		(1921–2020)	1995	Program specialist in the University of Delaware's Division of Continuing Education, first chair of the Commission on the Status of Women	
Ruth Ann Minner		(1935–2021)	1995	72nd governor of Delaware	
Ruth Oates-Graham		(1942–2023)	1995	National Association of State EMS Directors	
Helen S. Balick		(1930–2020)	1994	U.S. Bankruptcy Court judge	
Eleanor L. Cain		(1933–2019)	1994	Director of the Delaware Division of Services for Aging and Physical Disabilities	
Harriet Ruth Williams		(1915–1999)	1994	Chair, Dept of Chemistry, Delaware State University	
Mae D. Hightower-Vandamm		(1926–2014)	1993	Executive director of Delaware Curative Workshop	
Carol E. Hoffecker		(1938–)	1993	Chair of the University of Delaware Department of History	
Elizabeth Neal			1993	Deputy warden of New Castle County Community Corrections	
Ada Leigh Soles		(1937–2010)	1993	Member of the Delaware House of Representatives	
Frances D. Swift Tatnall		(1874–1966)	1993	Founder of the Tatnall School in Wilmington	
Claire La Mar Carey		(1943–)	1992	Director of the Walnut Street YMCA's Black Achiever program	
Lozelle Jenkins DeLuz		(1927–2018)	1992	President of DeLuz Management Consultants	
Margaret R. Manning		(1918–2015)	1992	Member of the Delaware Senate	
Jane T. Mitchell		(1929–2012)	1992	First woman elected master of the Delaware State Grange	
Madaline Elliot Buchanan		(1908–1995)	1991	President of the Delaware Board of Education	
Katherine L. Esterly		(1925–2014)	1991	Worked to establish the Neonatal Intensive Care Unit at Christiana Hospital	
Nancy Churchman Sawin		(1919–2008)	1991	Author; lacrosse and field hockey player	
Winifred J. Robinson		(1868–1962)	1990	First dean of the Women's College of the University of Delaware	
Mary Ann Sorden Stuart		(1828–1893)	1990	Suffragist, "Delaware's first feminist"	
Pauline Dyson		(1891–1970)	1989	Teacher and community leader	
Genevieve W. Gore		(1913–2005)	1989	Founded W. L. Gore and Associates with her husband, Wilbert (Bill) Lee Gore	
Margaret I. Handy		(1889–1977)	1988	Pioneering doctor who was one of the first to specialise in paediatric medicine; in 1945, she established the first mothers' milk bank at Delaware Hospital (now Wilmington Hospital) in Wilmington	
Jane E. Mitchell		(1921–2004)	1988	First African American registered nurse to be hired in a Delaware hospital	
Marguerite Hill Burnett		(1885–1966)	1987	State director of adult education	
Florence Bayard Hilles		(1865–1954)	1987	One of the Silent Sentinels, a group of women in favor of women's suffrage who protested in front of the White House during Woodrow Wilson's presidency	
Gertrude M. Lowell		(1901–1994)	1987	Founder of the Delaware Senior Citizen publication	
Elizabeth H. Ryan		(1919–2014)	1987	League of Women Voters, past president of Delaware Council on Crime and Justice	
Roxana Cannon Arsht		(1915–2003)	1986	First female judge in Delaware	
Emily P. Bissell		(1861–1948)	1986	Social worker and activist who introduced Christmas Seals to the United States	
Hilda Davis		(1905–2001)	1986	First African American woman to hold a full-time faculty position at the University of Delaware	
Mabel Vernon		(1884–1975)	1986	One of the Silent Sentinels, a group of women in favor of women's suffrage who protested in front of the White House during Woodrow Wilson's presidency	
Louise T. Conner		(1918–1983)	1985	Member of the Delaware House of Representatives, representing Brandywine Hundred	
Norma B. Handloff		(1913–2002)	1985	Newark's first woman mayor, 1966–1973	
Mary Askew Mather		(1861–1925)	1985	President of the New Century Club	
Mary Jornlin Theisen		(1927–2007)	1985	First woman elected New Castle County executive	
Esther Schauer Frear		(1909–2000)	1983	Wife of Senator J. Allen Frear Jr., member of the Senate Ladies Red Cross Unit	
Sallie Topkis Ginns		(1880–1976)	1983	Member of the National Woman's Party, suffragist	
Edith Jackson Newton		(1905–1996)	1983	Educator	
Cecile Long Steele		(1900–1940)	1983	Pioneer of Delaware's broiler chicken industry	
Vera Gilbride Davis		(1894–1974)	1982	First woman elected to the Delaware Senate	
Mabel L. Fisher Ridgely		(1872–1962)	1982	Preservationist and suffragist	
Emalea Pusey Warner		(1853–1948)	1982	Successfully campaigned for public vocational education and has a local elementary school named in her honor	
Pauline A. Young		(1900–1991)	1982	Teacher, librarian, and lecturer	
Annie Jump Cannon		(1863–1941)	1981	Astronomer whose cataloging work was instrumental in the development of contemporary stellar classification	
Pearl Herlihy Daniels		(1910–1994)	1981	Collector of historical maps	
Ruth Mitchell Laws		(1912–2010)	1981	Educator; vice president of the Delaware Technical Community College	
Mary Ann Wright		(1920–2006)	1981	Cerebral palsy survivor; in 1948 teamed with polio survivor Agnes Peronne to co-found the Mancus Foundation, an organization to assist disabled people; president of the organization for 58 years	
