= Cashman =

Cashman may refer to:

== People ==
Cashman is a surname of Irish origin.

- Blake Cashman (born 1996), American football player
- Brian Cashman (born 1967), American baseball executive
- Carl Cashman (born 1991), English politician
- Chris Cashman (born 1975), American filmmaker
- Christy Scott Cashman, American writer, actress, producer, and philanthropist
- Dan Cashman (1933–2019), American actor and audiobook narrator
- Danny Cashman (born 2001), English footballer
- Darragh Cashman (born 2002), Irish Gaelic footballer
- David John Cashman (1912–1971), English Catholic prelate
- Denis Cashman (1843–1897), Irish political prisoner and diarist
- Edward Cashman (born 1943), American lawyer and retired judge
- Edward Cashman (admiral) (born 1965), American naval officer
- Ellen Imelda Cashman (1891–1983), Australian trade unionist
- Eugene C. Cashman (1921–2000), American policeman, businessman and racehorse owner
- Greer Fay Cashman, Australian-Israeli journalist
- Harry Cashman (1869–1912), American stage and silent film actor
- Jack Cashman (1906–1982), Australian footballer
- Jack Cashman (author), Irish-American author
- Jay Cashman, American owner of construction company by same name
- Jeanne Cashman (born 1943), American nun and homeless shelter director
- Jeffrey B. Cashman, United States Air Force general
- Jim Cashman (actor), American TV and radio actor and writer
- Jim Cashman (hurler) (born 1965), Irish hurler
- Josephine Cashman, Aboriginal Australian lawyer and entrepreneur
- Karen Cashman (born 1971), American speed skater
- Katharine Cashman (born 1954), American volcanologist
- Keely Cashman (born 1999), American alpine skier
- John Cashman (disambiguation), several people
- Michael Cashman (born 1950), British actor, dancer and politician
- Michael Cashman (American politician) (born 1981), Member of the New York State Assembly
- Mick Cashman (1931–1988), Irish hurler
- Nellie Cashman (1845–1925), Irish-born gold prospector, nurse and restaurateur
- Niall Cashman (born 1995), Irish hurler
- Pat Cashman (born 1950), American comedian
- Peter L. Cashman (born 1936), American politician
- Reid Cashman (born 1983), American ice hockey player
- Sean Cashman (born 1987), American baseball coach
- Sue Cashman, Irish camogie player
- Terry Cashman (born Dennis Minogue in 1941), American record producer and singer-songwriter
- Thomas Edward Cashman (born 1988), British drug-dealer convicted of murder
- Tom Cashman (born 1957), Irish hurler and coach
- Tom Cashman (comedian) (born 1989), Australian comedian and writer
- Veronica Cashman (born 1982), American-Mexican soccer and futsal player
- Wayne Cashman (born 1945), Canadian ice-hockey player and coach
- Willie Cashman (born 1961), Irish hurler
- Cashman Peters (born 1956), British author and broadcaster

== Places ==
- Cashman, Edmonton, Alberta, Canada
- Cashman Center, Las Vegas, Nevada, United States
  - Cashman Field, adjacent to Cashman Center

== Other uses ==
- Cashman (video game), 1983 game
