= Mary Seward Phillips Eskridge =

American suffragist (1883–1967)

Mary Seward Philips Eskridge
- Born: Mary Seward Philips; August 28, 1883; Seaford, Delaware, US
- Died: February 2, 1967 (aged 83)
- Other name: Mrs. John Eskridge
- Organization(s): Delaware Equal Suffrage Association (Treasurer), Delaware League of Women Voters
- Known for: Suffrage activism
- Political party: Democratic
- Spouse: Captain John R. Eskridge (m. 1903)
- Children: 3
- Awards: Inducted into Hall of Fame of Delaware Women (2020)

Mary Seward Phillips Eskridge (1883–1967) was an American suffragist and clubwoman from Delaware. After the Nineteenth Amendment was ratified, she became involved in the Delaware Democratic Party and the League of Women Voters in Delaware. Eskridge was inducted into the Hall of Fame of Delaware Women in recognition of her activism in 2020.

== Public life ==
Eskridge's involvement in public life had initially been non-political. She became the president of Seaford's Acorn Club in 1913, having joined after the birth of her two children. The Acorn Club was founded in 1902 by a group of 12 women who aimed to establish a public library for the community and, by 1912, had established one of the United States' first bookmobiles by working with Mary Hopkins of the Delaware State Library Commission.

As well as her involvement in the Acorn Club, she was involved in Seaford's Parent Teacher Association between at least 1915 and 1936, serving as vice-president and later President of the Association for two years.

Following WWI, she served as Chair of the Liberty Bonds Program for Western Sussex County. Liberty bonds were sold by the U.S. government before and after WWI to support the Allied cause.

== Suffrage activism ==
In 1919, Eskridge joined the suffrage rights movement in Delaware as the Delaware Equal Suffrage Association (DESA) continued its campaign for the ratification of the Nineteenth Amendment in the state legislature. Founded in 1895, DESA was the state's largest suffrage organisation, working both to build grassroots support for women's suffrage and to lobby legislators (on the state and national level) for ratification.

She initially served as vice-president of Seaford's branch of the DESA, chaired by Anna Morse (born Anna Bathsheba Fisher) who had also been involved in Seaford's Acorn Club. But, by September 1919, Eskridge was serving as co-chair for Sussex County's chapter of the Ratification Committee along with Margaret Burton White Houston, wife of Republican representative Robert G. Houston. She was nominated for the position by Emalea Pusey Warner, a leader in the Delaware suffrage movement as DESA's vice-president and also leader of Delaware State Federation of Women's Clubs in which Eskridge had served as secretary.

Soon after, Eskridge was elected to serve as DESA's State Treasurer at the Delaware Equal Suffrage Convention hosted in the state's capital of Dover on November 10. According to an article from the Cape Gazette, the convention was attended by a number of other DESA delegates from across Sussex County, such as Anna Morse, Mae Cooper, and Mary Calloway.

Eskridge continued her involvement with DESA during 1920, as the Association campaigned for the ratification of the Nineteenth Amendment in a special legislative session of the Delaware General Assembly between March and June. Ultimately, the session was adjourned unsuccessfully, without the ratification of the amendment. However, it would be ratified as an amendment to the constitution soon after.

== Political involvement ==
After the Nineteenth Amendment was ratified to mandate women's suffrage in 1920, Eskridge's prior involvement in DESA led her to become involved in the League of Women Voters (DESA's successor) as Treasurer and the Delaware Democratic Party as the state's National Committeewoman from 1928.

== Personal life ==
Eskridge was born Mary Seward Philips on August 28, 1883, in Seaford, Delaware. In 1903, she married Captain John Roe Eskridge, who later became the second Mayor of Seaford in 1920 and went on to serve for four terms. She died while visiting her daughter on February 2, 1967.
