= Vera Gilbride Davis =

American politician (1894–1974)

- Vera Gilbride Davis, from a 1952 newspaper
- Born: July 22, 1894; Wilmington, Delaware
- Died: May 6, 1974 (aged 79); Dover, Delaware
- Occupations: Politician, suffragist
- Known for: first woman elected to the Delaware state senate (1946)

Vera Gilbride Davis (July 22, 1894 – May 6, 1974) was an American educator and politician, known as the "Grand Dame of Delaware Politics". She was the first woman elected to statewide office in Delaware in 1956, after a long career in the state legislature. In 1982 she was inducted into the Delaware Women's Hall of Fame.

== Early life ==
Vera M. Gilbride was born in Wilmington, Delaware in 1894, the daughter of John J. Gilbride and Mary Ellen Crumlish Gilbride. She attended school at the Ursuline Academy in Wilmington.

== Career ==
Davis, a Republican, was known as the "Grand Dame of Delaware Politics". She became a bill clerk in Delaware's House of Representatives in 1927. She was elected to the state Senate in 1946. In 1949, she was the first woman elected President Pro Tempore of the state Senate. She was the first woman to be majority leader in the Delaware House of Representatives in 1952. In 1956 she became the first woman elected to statewide office in Delaware, when she became state treasurer. She ran for re-election in 1958, but lost.

Davis was active in the women's suffrage movement and sang as a church soloist as a young woman. She taught school in Dover during World War I, and was an adult education teacher in the 1930s. She was president of Easter Seals of Delaware and served on many executive boards, including at Kent General Hospital.

== Personal life ==
Gilbride married lawyer Frank Hall Davis in 1915. They had two sons, Frank Jr. and John, who both served in World War II. She was named Delaware Mother of the Year in 1962. She was widowed when Frank H. Davis died in 1950, and she died in 1974, aged 79 years, at a nursing home in Dover, Delaware. The week she died, the Delaware State House issued a joint resolution in her memory. In 1982 she was inducted into the Delaware Women's Hall of Fame. Her papers are in the Delaware Public Archives.
