= Arsht =

Arsht is a surname. Notable people with the surname include:

- Adrienne Arsht (born 1942), American businesswoman and philanthropist
  - Arsht Center
- Roxana Cannon Arsht (1915–2003), American judge
