= Margaret Burton White Houston =

- Organization(s): Delaware Equal Suffrage Association (Vice-President, 1896-1904), Georgetown New Century Club (Founder), Delaware State Federation of Women's Clubs (President), Delaware League of Women Voters
- Known for: Suffrage activism
- Movement: Women's suffrage in Delaware
- Spouse: Robert G. Houston (m. 1888)
- Awards: Hall of Fame of Delaware Women (inducted 2020)

Margaret Burton White Houston (1864–1937) was an American suffragist and clubwoman from Georgetown, Delaware. She served as a founding vice-president of the Delaware Equal Suffrage Association for eight years, was a founder of Georgetown's New Century Club (known for founding the town's public library), and a president of the Delaware State Federation of Women's Clubs.

In 2020, to mark the centenary of the Nineteenth Amendment, she was inducted into the Hall of Fame of Delaware Women along with Mary Seward Phillips Eskridge, another suffragist from Sussex County, Delaware, in recognition of her activism.

== Suffrage activism ==
Houston is known for her role as a leader in the campaign for women's suffrage in Delaware through her involvement in the Delaware Equal Suffrage Association (DESA). DESA was formed in January 1896 and affiliated with the National American Women's Suffrage Association (NAWSA) at the state's first annual suffrage convention in Wilmington. Houston became the association's founding vice-president, a role she held for at least eight years.

A year later, in 1897, Houston appeared before the Delaware Constitutional Convention. She addressed the delegates along with Emalea Pusey Warner and Emma Worrell. They advocated for Delaware women to be given the right to vote in the state's new constitution, producing petitions in support of their proposal signed by over 3,000 people. The Convention led to the ratification of the state's fourth and current governing document, which came into effect on June 10 that year, but maintained the requirement that voters had to be male.

After the Nineteenth Amendment to the United States' Constitution came into effect in 1920, mandating women's suffrage, like many other suffragists from Delaware, Houston became involved in Delaware's chapter of the League of Women Voters. She served as a Vice President of the League after its founding in 1920.

== Personal life ==
Margaret Burton White married Robert G. Houston, a lawyer, publisher, and Republican politician from Georgetown, DelawareHouston was described by her niece as "a firebrand who never hesitated to speak her mind, most decidedly, on anything she felt important.”
