= Reynolds Thomas =

American realist painter (1927 - 1991)

Reynolds Thomas (1927–1991) was an American realist painter. His work was often compared to that of Andrew Wyeth. He was the first American artist commissioned by the Vatican to paint a portrait of the pope. Princess Grace of Monaco, an admirer of Thomas's work, commissioned him to make several paintings, including a full-length portrait of the princess, for which he is best known and to have won several awards. He was listed in “Who's Who of American Art” and in the “International Register Artists of Europe”.

== Biography ==
Thomas was born Harry Reynolds Thomas in Wilmington, Delaware on January 21, 1927. He began painting and drawing at age eleven, and graduated from Pierre S. du Pont High School in 1954. After serving in World War II, Thomas studied at the Pennsylvania Academy of the Fine Arts, then at Nacional des Bellas Artes in Mexico. Later, he was taught by Andrew Wyeth, who would later become friends with Thomas and publicly support Thomas's career.

On November 8, 1991, Thomas died of congestive heart failure at Christiana Hospital in Newark, Delaware. He was 64 years old and survived by three children.

== Work ==
On December 4, 1959, Thomas had his first one-man exhibition, displaying 30 pieces at Brecks Mill gallery in Wilmington, Delaware.

In 1961, Thomas moved to Switzerland, then, a year later, his first European one-man show was held in Cannes, France.

Princess Grace of Monaco hosted a one-man show for Thomas in 1963 at the Galerie Rauch in Monaco. The princess had previously purchased several paintings by Thomas and later commissioned him to make a painting as a birthday gift to her husband, Prince Rainier.

In the summer of 1966, with the support of Princess Grace, Thomas exhibited 21 pieces at the Gallery of the Hôtel de Paris. The show was opened by Prince Rainier and Princess Grace. In 1971, Thomas completed a full-length portrait of Princess Grace sitting in her garden at Monaco.

In January 1973, Thomas was commissioned by the Vatican to paint two portraits of Pope Paul VI. After six months of painting, Thomas presented two portraits to the pope on June 20. As a non-Catholic, Thomas did not expect to be allowed to paint the pope's portrait. Upon viewing the initial sketches of the portraits, the pope told the artist he “wasn't worthy of them”.

Andrew Wyeth and his wife donated a watercolor painting by Thomas titled, “Maine Barn” to the Farnsworth Art Museum in 1966, the same museum known to have an extensive collection of Wyeth's paintings.

After Princess Grace's death in 1982, Thomas credited her for the success of his artwork sales in Europe as well as the opportunity to paint the portraits of Pope Paul VI. Thomas was also a book illustrator and a member of American Watercolor Society.
