= Roxana Cannon Arsht =

American judge (1915–2003)

Delaware Family Court
- In office 1971–1983
- Nominated by: Russell W. Peterson

Personal details
- Born: July 18, 1915 Wilmington, Delaware, U.S.
- Died: October 3, 2003 (aged 88) Newark, Delaware, U.S.
- Education: Goucher College (BA); University of Pennsylvania Law School
- Awards: Hall of Fame of Delaware Women

Roxana Cannon Arsht (July 18, 1915 – October 3, 2003) was an American judge. She was the fifth woman to be admitted to the bar in the U.S. state of Delaware, and the first to hold a judicial position in the state's history. After retiring, she took part in a philanthropic career until the end of her life. Arsht received several awards for her work, and was inducted into the Hall of Fame of Delaware Women in 1986.

== Biography ==
Roxana Cannon was born in Wilmington, Delaware, at Second and Adams streets, to Samuel and Tillie Statnekoo Cannon. Her father was an immigrant from Russia, and emphasized the importance of education. After attending public schools across Wilmington, she received a Bachelor of Arts degree from Goucher College, and graduated from the University of Pennsylvania Law School with a degree in law in 1939; she was one of two women to graduate in her class. Cannon passed the Bar in 1941, but was unable to find a job, which became even more difficult when she married fellow lawyer Samuel Arsht. She became a mother of two daughters, and focused her attention on working for the reproductive rights of women, including through her involvement in the development of Planned Parenthood's Delaware office.

She began working for Delaware Family Court in 1962 in a volunteer master position. Nine years later, the Governor of Delaware Russell W. Peterson appointed Arsht as a judge in Delaware Family Court, making her the first woman to hold a judicial position in the state's history. She retired from the position in 1983, and started a new job in philanthropy. Arsht and her husband contributed $2 million to the campaign towards the construction of Arsht Hall on the primary campus of the University of Delaware's Academy of Lifelong Learning (now called Osher Lifelong Learning Institute). She was the first women to serve on the Medical Center of Delaware's board between 1993 and 1997, and was a trustee of the Christiana Care Health System for nearly 30 years. Before the death of her husband, she donated $2.5 million in support of the construction of the Roxana Cannon Arsht Surgicenter. She died at Christiana Hospital in Newark, Delaware on October 3, 2003.

== Legacy ==
Arsht was a role model for woman practicing law, and created a precedent which allowed others to follow. She described herself as "gutsy, independent and not afraid to challenge the status quo" and was considered one of Delaware's most influential women in the past half-century. She received numerous awards which included the First State Distinguished Service Award, the Josiah Marvel Cup, the Trailblazer Award, and was granted recognition from the National Conference for Community and Justice. In 1986, Arsht was inducted into the Hall of Fame of Delaware Women.
