= Kirchmann =

Kirchmann is a surname of Middle High German origin. Deriving from the German "kirch", it was an occupational name, referring to someone either working in or living near a church. It was sometimes Americanized as Cashman.

Notable people with the surname include:

- Bohuslav Kirchmann (born 1902 - date of death unknown), Czech fencer
- Leah Kirchmann (born 1990), Canadian racing cyclist
- Sigrid Kirchmann (born 1966), former high jumper from Austria

== See also ==
- Julius von Kirchmann (1802–1884), German jurist and philosopher
- Kirkman (harpsichord makers), also called Kirchmann
