= Winifred Josephine Robinson =

American botanist and educator

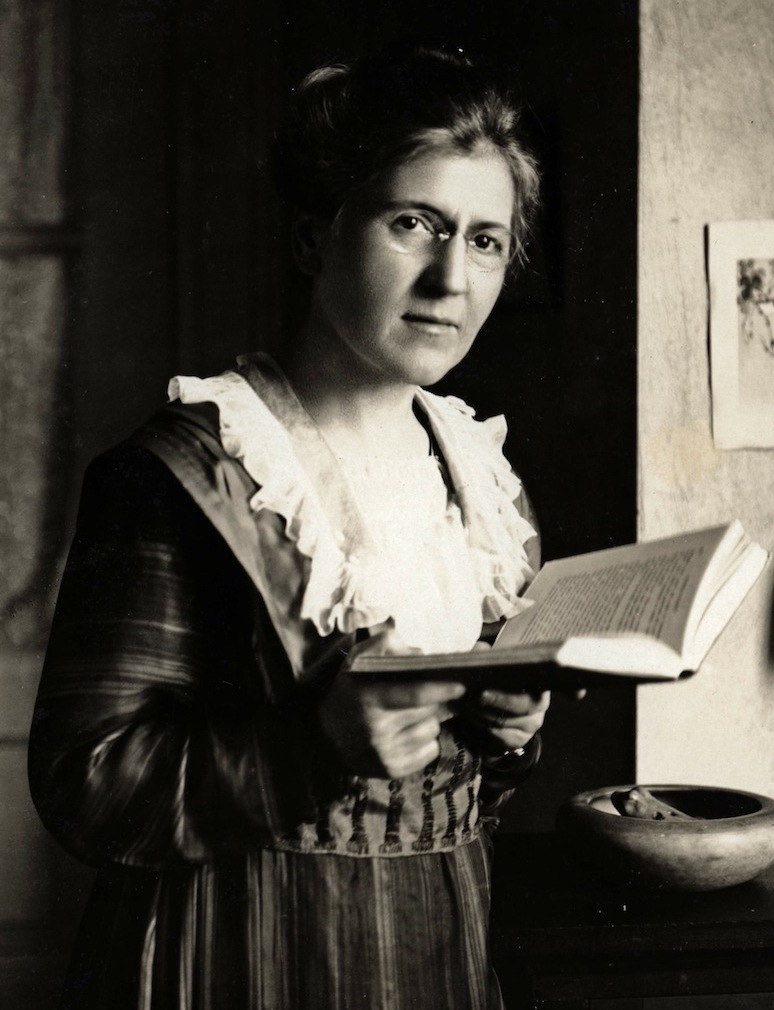
- Robinson in 1914
- Born: 1867; Barry County, Michigan
- Died: 1962 (aged 94–95)
- Burial place: Mount Evergreen Cemetery
- Education: University of Michigan; Columbia University
- Occupations: Botanist, educator, educational administrator
- Known for: First dean of the Women's College of the University of Delaware
- Scientific career
- Author abbrev. (botany): W.J.Rob.

Winifred Josephine Robinson (1867–1962) was an American botanist, educator, and educational administrator. As a botanist, she studied ferns and wrote several papers and books. She was the first dean of the Women's College of the University of Delaware, which was founded in 1914.

== Life and work ==
Robinson was born and raised in Barry County, Michigan, the only child of Walter Joseph and Pamela Wheelock Robinson. She earned a bachelor's degree in biology from the University of Michigan in 1899, where she was elected to Phi Beta Kappa. She then worked at Vassar College, where she taught in the Botany Department. Robinson earned a master's degree from Columbia University by 1904 and earned her Ph.D. by 1912 after "much hard work cataloging ferns in Hawaii."

Robinson was named the first dean of the Women's College of Delaware at the University of Delaware, where she worked as an administrator, an educator and the live-in Resident Dean for the 48 female students of the first-year class. In the early 1920’s, she accompanied a co-educational study abroad trip to France.

Initially, Robinson managed the College's only three female professors (who taught Home Economics, Education, and Chemistry/Athletics) in addition to a secretary, a dorm matron and a security guard.

In the College's early days, Robinson was the only woman able to cast a vote in the administrative committee of five. She retired in 1938.

== Honors ==
- In 1940, the University of Delaware's Science Hall was renamed in her honor.
- Archives of her papers can be found at the University of Delaware.
- Inducted into the Hall of Fame of Delaware Women.

== Selected written works ==
- Robinson, Winifred J. (September 1906). "The Filmy Ferns (Hymenophyllaceae)". The Plant World. 9 (9): 219–221. JSTOR 43476551.
- Robinson, Winifred J. (May 1909). "Reproduction by Budding in Drosera". Torreya. 9 (5): 89–96. JSTOR 40594814.
- Robinson, W. J. (1947). History of the Women's College of the University of Delaware, 1914-1938. University of Delaware.
