= Hilda Andrea Davis =

American educator

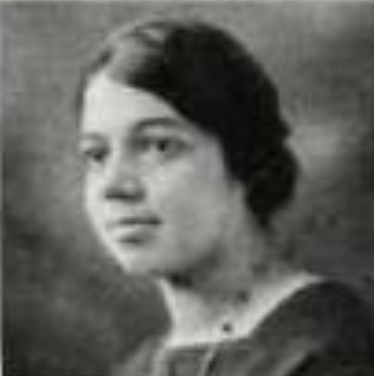
- Hilda Andrea Davis, from a 1925 yearbook
- Born: May 24, 1905; Washington, D.C.
- Died: October 6, 2001 (aged 96); Newark, Delaware
- Occupation(s): Educator, college administrator, mental health professional
- Known for: Delaware Women's Hall of Fame (1986)

Hilda Andrea Davis (May 24, 1905 – October 6, 2001) was an American educator, college administrator, and mental health professional.

== Early life ==
Davis was born in Washington, D.C., the daughter of Louis Alexander Davis and Ruth G. Cooke Davis. She graduated from Dunbar High School in 1921. She graduated from Howard University in 1925. She earned a master's degree in English literature at Radcliffe College in 1932, and completed doctoral studies in human development at the University of Chicago in 1953.

At Howard, she was president of the Alpha chapter of Delta Sigma Theta.

== Career ==
Davis taught English and Latin at Palmer Memorial Institute in Sedalia, North Carolina from 1925 to 1932. She was a professor and dean of women at Shaw University in Raleigh from 1932 to 1936. In 1936, she became dean of women and professor of English at Talladega College in Alabama, where she stayed on the faculty until 1952. Later in life, she was on the staff at the University of Delaware, where she was associate director of the Writing Center from 1965 to 1970 and where she was the first Black woman to be a full-time faculty member, and a professor of English at Wilmington College, from 1970 to 1977. She was the second president of the Association of Deans of Women and Advisors to Girls in Negro Schools, and served two terms as president of the National Association of College Women. She was one of the first active Black members of the American Association of University Women (AAUW).

Beyond academic work, Davis was head of research at Governor Bacon Health Center in Delaware from 1954. She taught community courses, including "You and Your Teen-Ager". She worked as chief of medical records at Delaware State Hospital from 1961 to 1968, and served on the President's Commission to Study the Needs of Black Women during the Johnson administration, and the President's Commission on Elementary and Secondary School Finance during the Nixon administration.

Davis was active in many community organizations, including the YWCA and the League of Women Voters, and in church activities. She was the first woman to serve as senior warden in the Episcopal Diocese of Delaware.

== Awards ==
Davis was inducted into the Delaware Women's Hall of Fame in 1986, and recognized with the University of Delaware Medal of Distinction in 1987. She was awarded an honorary doctorate by Trinity Washington University in 1989.

== Personal life ==
Davis enjoyed traveling, and mentioned in a 1977 newspaper profile that she had visited all fifty United States, with further trips to the Caribbean, the United Kingdom, Europe, and the Middle East. In 1976. she went to Italy to study Renaissance art. She died from pneumonia in 2001, aged 96 years, in Newark, Delaware. A women's residence operated by the YWCA of New Castle County is named in her honor.
