= Beebe Healthcare =

Coordinates: 38.7717°N 75.1428°W

Beebe Medical Center
- Beebe Healthcare

Geography
- Location: Lewes, Delaware, United States

Organization
- Funding: Non-profit hospital
- Type: General

Services
- Emergency department: Trauma center Level III; Adult Level III
- Beds: 210

Links
- Website: www.beebehealthcare.org
- Lists: Hospitals in Delaware

Beebe Healthcare is a healthcare system serving Sussex County in southern Delaware in the United States. Its primary facility is Beebe Medical Center, a hospital in Lewes.

== History ==
Beebe Medical Center was founded in 1916 by Dr. James Beebe and Dr. Richard C. Beebe and was the first private hospital in Delaware outside of Wilmington. In 1921, the hospital expanded and the Beebe School of Nursing was founded. Over the years, Beebe Medical Center underwent numerous expansions and improvements. In 1981, a seasonal emergency room was opened in Bethany Beach, being relocated to Millville in 1983. In the 1990s, a cancer center and parking garage were added to the hospital. In 1999, the emergency department was expanded. The first cardiac surgery was performed at Beebe Medical Center in 2007. The cancer center relocated to Rehoboth Beach the same year. A new wing opened at the hospital in 2008 offering a larger emergency department.

== Services ==
Beebe Medical Center offers inpatient services such as a birthing room, heart surgery, and cancer services, in addition to several outpatient services. The hospital has a 24-hour emergency department with a Level III trauma center.

== Locations ==
In addition to Beebe Medical Center in Lewes, Beebe Healthcare operates outpatient facilities in Rehoboth Beach, Milton, Georgetown, Long Neck, Millsboro, and Millville.
