= Greenwold (Dover, Delaware) =

Historic house in Delaware, United States

- U.S. National Register of Historic Places
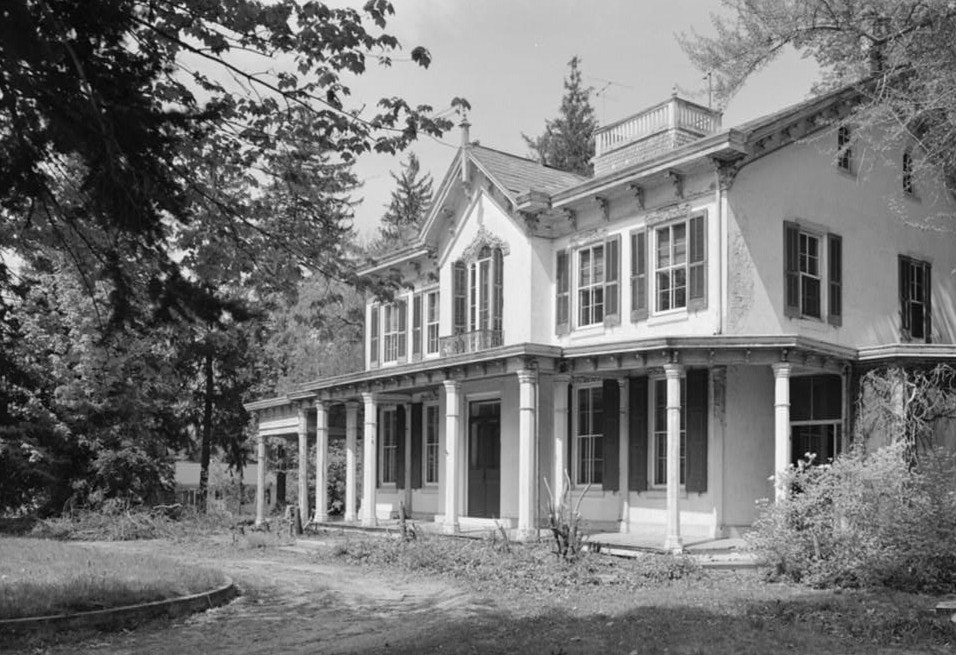
- Greenwold, HABS Photo, July 1982

- Location within Delaware Location within the United States
- Location: 625 S. State St., Dover, Delaware
- Coordinates: 39°9′6″N 75°31′19″W
- Area: 1 acre (0.40 ha)
- Built: 1863
- Built by: Saunders, William
- NRHP reference No.: 73000488
- Added to NRHP: March 20, 1973

Greenwold, also known as the Manlove Hayes House, was a historic home formerly located in Dover, Kent County, Delaware. It was built in 1863, and consisted of a 2 1/2-story center hall plan main house with a rear service wing. The main house was a five bay wide, stuccoed structure. It had a cross-gable roof with a bracketed cornice. The house featured a full-width verandah. The property retained much of its original landscaping at the time of its addition to the National Register of Historic Places.

The house was built in 1863 by Manlove Hayes, a civil engineer, businessman, and local politician. The house remained in his family until 1946, when it was bought by Carl and Sarah Scull. Carl was the chief of staff at Kent General Hospital, now Bayhealth Medical Center. He died in 1950. Sarah continued to live in the house, and submitted a successful application to have it added to the National Register of Historic Places in 1973.

She sold the home to Bayhealth in 1982, and it was used by the health system for office until about 2011, when heating and cooling costs became prohibitive. In 2020, Bayhealth proposed the demolition of Greenwold and neighboring properties for the construction of a staff parking lot. This activity commenced in August 2023.
