= Mabel Lloyd Ridgely =

Suffragist and historical preservationist

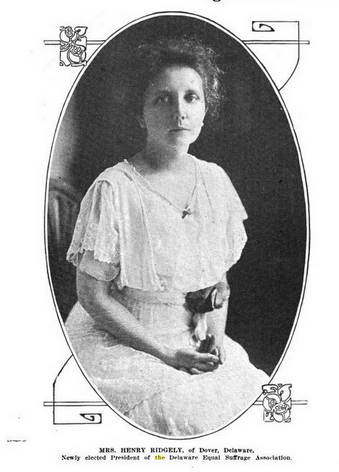
- Mabel Lloyd Ridgely, from a 1919 publication.
- Born: Mabel Lloyd Fisher; April 13, 1872; Washington, D. C.
- Died: February 11, 1962 (aged 89)
- Resting place: Dover, Delaware
- Occupations: Preservationist, Suffragist
- Spouse: Henry Ridgely (m. 1893; died in 1940)

Mabel Lloyd Fisher Ridgely (April 13, 1872 – January 11, 1962) was an American suffragist and historical preservationist, president of the Delaware Equal Suffrage Association and of the Public Archives Commission, and a founder of Old Dover Days, an annual festival.

== Early life ==
Mabel Lloyd Fisher was born in Washington, D. C., the daughter of Charles G. Fisher and Philippa Lloyd Fisher.

== Career ==
Ridgely's suffrage work included a term as president of the Delaware Equal Suffrage Association. She worked to persuade the state's General Assembly to ratify the 19th Amendment in 1920. The state Senate voted to ratify but the lower house did not. After suffrage was won, Ridgely was the first president of the state's League of Women Voters.

Ridgely had a particular interest in historical preservation. She served as president of the Public Archives Commission in Delaware, helped restore and preserve the Old State House and the John Dickinson House in Dover, and was a founder and organizer of Old Dover Days, a festival focused on local history. She also helped to found the Delaware State Archives. She wrote a history of her husband's family, What Them Befell (1949), about the Ridgelys in colonial Delaware, based on their surviving correspondence.

During World War I, Mabel Lloyd Ridgely chaired the Women's Liberty Loan Committee in Delaware.

== Personal life ==
Mabel Lloyd Fisher married Henry Ridgely, a judge, in 1893. They had a daughter, Philippa E. Ridgely (1894-1983). Mabel was widowed when Henry, who was blind, died in 1940. Mabel Lloyd Ridgely died in 1962, aged 89 years. The research room at the Delaware Public Archives in Dover, Delaware is named for Mabel Lloyd Ridgely.

Mabel's grandson, Henry Ridgely Horsey, was a judge on the Delaware Supreme Court from 1978 to 1994.

== Legacy ==
Ridgely was inducted into the Hall of Fame of Delaware Women. The Delaware Public Archives named a research room in her honor.
