= Chandra Pitts =

American nonprofit executive

Chandra G. Pitts is the founder, president, and CEO of One Village Alliance, a global, social justice and education nonprofit.

== Biography ==
Pitts is the child of a Mexican-born mother and an African-American father. Pitts grew up in a poor, "non-multicultural" part of southern New Jersey. As a child, she experienced complexities relating to her cultural and ethnic identity.

Pitts began her career in Jamaica, educating youth whose parents could not afford their education. In 2008, Pitts developed the largest school-based mentoring program in the Christina School District. The next year, she became the founding President and CEO of The Village Learning Center, a program meant to bring learning to underachieving students. This program was adopted by the Delaware Department of Education and the New Jersey Department of Education and has been implemented in 42 schools.

The programs that Pitts developed use a gender-specific approach to healthy youth development, with a focus on Black and Hispanic families. She is one of the leaders in Delaware's responsible fatherhood movement.

Pitts was appointed as a Commissioner on the Delaware Commission for Women.

== Awards and honors ==
- 2012: Honored at the United Nations Global Women's Empowerment Forum
- 2012: NAACP Youth Impact Award
- 2015: Glamour (magazine) Hometown Heroes
- 2016: Hall of Fame of Delaware Women
- 2020: Delaware's Women in Business
