= List of hospitals in Delaware =

This is a list of hospitals in Delaware, a United States state. According to the American Hospital Directory, there were 17 hospitals in Delaware in 2020.

== Hospitals ==
- Bayhealth Medical Center
  - Bayhealth Emergency Center, Smyrna - Smyrna (Kent and New Castle counties)
  - Bayhealth Hospital, Kent Campus - Dover (Kent County)
  - Bayhealth Hospital, Sussex Campus - Milford (Kent and Sussex counties)
- Beebe Healthcare
  - Beebe Medical Center - Lewes (Sussex County)
  - South Coastal Health Campus Emergency Department - Millville (Sussex County)
- ChristianaCare - formerly Medical Centers of Delaware (MCD)
  - Christiana Hospital - Newark (New Castle County)
  - Middletown Emergency Department - Middletown (New Castle County)
  - Wilmington Hospital - Wilmington (New Castle County)
- Nemours Foundation
  - Nemours Children's Hospital, Delaware - Wilmington (New Castle County)
- State of Delaware
  - Delaware Hospital for the Chronically Ill - Smyrna (Kent and New Castle counties)
  - Delaware Psychiatric Center - Wilmington (New Castle County)
- TidalHealth Services
  - TidalHealth Nanticoke - Seaford (Sussex County)
- Trinity Health
  - Saint Francis Healthcare - Wilmington (New Castle County)
- Veterans Administration
  - Wilmington VA Medical Center - Elsmere (New Castle County)

== Historic hospitals ==
- City Hospital - Wilmington
  - Established in 1871
  - Located on Franklin Street, between Seventh and Eighth Streets
- Delaware Hospital - Wilmington
  - Provided facility for MCD nursing school
  - Most services moved when MCD opened Christiana Hospital
  - All remaining MCD facilities in the city relocated to building and renamed Wilmington Hospital
- Fort Delaware Hospital - near Delaware City
  - Served as medical facility for Confederate POWs and Union troops
  - Closed at end of Civil War
  - Now part of Fort Delaware State Park
  - There was a hospital at Ft. Dupont, near Delaware City. The building still exists but has been closed up and unused for many years.
- Heald's Hygeian Home for the Treatment of Patients
  - Established in 1871
  - Located at Shallcross Avenue and Van Buren Street
  - Closed in 1886; a year later the building became the new Homeopathic Hospital, later renamed Wilmington Memorial
- Riverside Hospital - Wilmington
  - Osteopathic hospital for Delaware
  - MCD purchased hospital when financial difficulties were encountered
  - Facility now run by Christiana Care as a rehab and outpatient facility
- Tilton Hospital - Wilmington
  - Named after Dr. James Tilton, Surgeon General of the United States Army during the War of 1812
  - Built in 1863 for Delaware soldiers in the American Civil War
  - Occupied block bounded by Ninth, Tenth, Tatnall, and West Streets
  - Closed in fall 1865
- Wilmington General Hospital - Wilmington
  - Former maternity hospital for Northern Delaware
  - After NAACP injunction lifted, MCD closed facility when opening Christiana Hospital
  - Facility demolished and replaced by Towne Estates Condos in Bayard Square neighborhood
- Wilmington Memorial Hospital - Wilmington
  - General surgical hospital for Northern Delaware
  - After NAACP injunction lifted, MCD closed facility when opening Christiana Hospital
  - Facility demolished and replaced by condo tower in Trolley Square neighborhood
