= Pearl Herlihy Daniels =

American lawyer

- Born: Pearl Glenn; 1910; Wilmington, Delaware
- Died: 1994 (aged 83–84); Wilmington, Delaware
- Other names: Pearl Herlihy
- Occupations: Activist, lawyer, historian
- Notable work: Pearl Herlihy Daniels Map Collection

Pearl Herlihy Daniels (1910–1994) was an American activist, lawyer, and historian. Born in Wilmington, Delaware, Daniels became a noted advocate for labor and children's rights in Delaware. In 1981 she was inducted into the Hall of Fame of Delaware Women, and her collection of maps and historical documents are in the archives of the University of Delaware.

== Biography ==
Daniels was born Pearl Glenn in Wilmington, Delaware in 1910. After graduating from high school in 1927, she married Thomas Herlihy, an aspiring law student. The couple moved to Cambridge, Massachusetts, where Thomas studied at Harvard Law before returning to Wilmington in the 1930s. Upon returning to Wilmington, Thomas set up a law practice and both Herlihys entered the local political scene, with Thomas eventually being elected Mayor of Wilmington in 1945.

During the 1940s, Daniels became active in local politics and activism; when her husband resigned his mayorship after one year to take an appointment as Chief Justice of the Municipal Court of Wilmington, Daniels continued her activities in local politics. She became noted as a strong advocate for labor rights, specifically those pertaining to children and migrant workers. In 1949 she was appointed to assist a committee in reworking the City of Wilmington's charter, and was active in state-level political drives to strengthen Delaware's narcotics laws. Continuing with her labor activism, in the 1950s she was appointed as the chairwomen of Delaware’s State Labor Commission, predecessor to the Delaware Labor Department.

In the 1950s, Daniels was appointed as chairwoman of the Eisenhower administration's National Commission on Children and Youths. She was likewise appointed to the Kennedy administration's Committee on Youth Employment and the Johnson administration's National Citizens Commission for Community Relations.

In addition to her political activism, Daniels — who never pursued a law degree — worked as a partner in her husband's firm, Herlihy & Herlihy. The couple had two sons, one of whom became an attorney while the other became a judge. Thomas Herlihy died in 1977, and Daniels married Charles E. Daniels in 1980, changing her name to Pearl Herlihy Daniels. In 1981, Daniels was inducted into the Hall of Fame of Delaware Women. She died in 1994.

=== Cartography ===
In addition to her political activism, Daniels was an avid collector of historic maps. From 1968 onward, she collected maps, atlases, books, and cartography equipment, most of which pertained to her home state of Delaware. She also conducted research into the cartological history of Delaware and gave lectures at the University of Delaware; after her death, Daniels's sons donated her collection (known as the Pearl Herlihy Daniels Map Collection) of historical documents to the university.
