= Jane E. Mitchell =

American nurse

Jane Evelyn Watson Mitchell (1921 - November 13, 2004) was an American nurse. Mitchell was the first African-American to work as a nurse in Delaware. Mitchell went on to work as the director of nursing at the Delaware State Psychiatric Hospital. Mitchell was also a civil rights activist and volunteer.

== Biography ==
Mitchell was born in 1921 in Coatesville, Pennsylvania and grew up in Wilmington, Delaware. Mitchell graduated from the all-black Howard High School school of nursing training at Provident Hospital in 1944. Mitchell wanted to come back to Delaware to work, but couldn't find employment. She was told by hospitals in the state that they did not hire African-American nurses. Instead, she worked at a Jewish hospital in Philadelphia.

In 1949, Dr. Mesrop A. Tarumianz who was looking for nurses with a background in psychology, hired Mitchell to come work for him at the Governor Bacon Health Center. Mitchell was the first African-American nurse to work in a Delaware hospital. She was also the first black nurse to work with patients of all races in a state hospital. After working at Bacon Health Center, she was transferred to the Delaware State Psychiatric Hospital in 1963. Mitchell earned her bachelor's degree from the University of Delaware in 1963 and eventually received a master's degree from Washington College. In 1969, she was appointed as director of nursing for the hospital. Mitchell retired from the Psychiatric Hospital in 1979. She continued to work as a volunteer for the Delaware State Board of Nursing after her retirement.

A new addition to the Psychiatric Hospital was added in 1998 and named "the Jane Mitchell building." In March 2000, Mitchell was inducted into the Hall of Fame of Delaware Women. During her life, Mitchell also worked with her husband, Littleton P. Mitchell, as a civil rights activist. She was involved with sit-ins and protests. Littleton was a long-time leader of the NAACP in Delaware. The couple were married in 1943 and had one child Philip, together. Mitchell died in her home in Delaware City on November 13, 2004. Senator Joe Biden gave her eulogy at the funeral. The Jane and Littleton Mitchell Center for African American Heritage (within the Delaware History Museum building) in Delaware is named for both Mitchell and her husband.
