= Erin Arvedlund =

American financial journalist

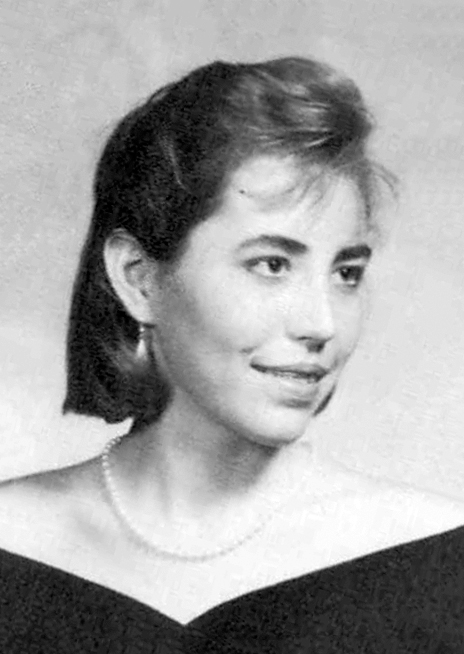
- High school yearbook portrait, 1988
- Born: Wilmington, Delaware, U.S.
- Education: Tufts University
- Occupations: Journalist; Author
- Known for: Exposing Bernie Madoff's Ponzi scheme
- Notable work: Too Good to Be True: The Rise and Fall of Bernie Madoff

Erin Elizabeth Arvedlund is an American financial journalist. Her articles use the byline Erin E. Arvedlund, while she uses Erin Arvedlund for her books. In 2001, she wrote an article for Barron's that was the first widely published media coverage to question the supposed success of Bernie Madoff's wealth management business. Like what happened a year earlier, when securities industry executive Harry Markopolos approached the United States Securities and Exchange Commission directly with allegations, no authorities exercised due diligence regarding the allegations, and the Madoff investment scandal grew – unabated – until the $64.8 billion fraud collapsed when the 2008 financial crisis destroyed the underpinnings of Madoff's Ponzi scheme.

== Early life ==
Arvedlund's family moved to Marblehead, Massachusetts when she was a toddler, then moved to Wilmington, Delaware when she was entering grade school, where her father worked as an investment manager for DuPont's company pension funds. She graduated from Ursuline Academy in 1984 and Archmere Academy in 1988, both in Wilmington. She attended Tufts University before starting her career at Dow Jones News Service. She lives in Philadelphia.

== Career ==
=== Journalist ===
Arvedlund has written for Barron's, The Wall Street Journal, The Moscow Times, The New York Times, TheStreet.com, and Portfolio.com. In February 2011, her "Your Money" column debuted in The Philadelphia Inquirer.

On May 7, 2001, Barron's published her article "Don't Ask, Don't Tell: Bernie Madoff is so secretive, he even asks his investors to keep mum". This was only the second investigative article, following closely on Michael Ocrant's May 1, 2001 article in industry publication MARHedge, to question Bernie Madoff's scheme, his demand for investor secrecy and his "enviably steady gains".

The United States Securities and Exchange Commission (SEC) did not properly investigate Madoff until after the 2008 financial crisis destroyed the underpinnings of Madoff's $64.8 billion fraud, causing his Ponzi scheme to collapse in December 2008. During the belated investigation, SEC Exhibit 104 finally acknowledged the Ocrant and Arvedlund articles:

"Madoff said that when the MarHedge and Barron's [sic] articles came out, he expected the SEC to come to him, and that he was surprised the SEC didn't follow up with him. He also mentioned that Erin Arvedlund ("That idiot woman from Barron's.") didn't know what she was talking about, and that it was obvious she was not familiar with the industry."

=== Author ===
Arvedlund's first book, Too Good to be True: The Rise and Fall of Bernie Madoff, was published in August 2009. This was followed in June 2010 by The Club No One Wanted to Join - Madoff Victims in Their Own Words, which she edited from the stories told by Madoff's victims.

Arvedlund also wrote a book on the Libor scandal, Open Secret: The Global Banking Conspiracy That Swindled Investors Out of Billions, published in September 2014, covering how the London Interbank Offered Rate (Libor), a primary benchmark for short-term interest rates around the world, had been manipulated by major banks across the world until caught in 2012.
