= John Cashman =

John Cashman may refer to:

- John Cashman (basketball) (1892–1949), American basketball coach active in 1920s
- John Cashman (1890s hurler), Irish hurler for Blackrock and Cork
- John Cashman (hurler, born 1997), Irish hurler for Blackrock and Cork
- John Cashman (journalist) (1917–1945), American war correspondent killed in a plane crash
- John Cashman (rower) (born 1972), American rower
- John E. Cashman, Boeing 777 chief test pilot
- John E. Cashman (1865–1946), Wisconsin politician

== See also ==
- Jack Cashman (1906–1982), Australian rules footballer
