= Bayhealth Medical Center =

Coordinates: 39.1512°N 75.5230°W

Geography
- Location: Dover and Milford, Delaware, United States

Organization
- Type: General

Services
- Emergency department: Trauma center Level III; Adult Level III
- Beds: 316

Links
- Website: www.bayhealth.org
- Lists: Hospitals in Delaware

Bayhealth Medical Center is a healthcare system serving the central and southern portion of Delaware in the United States.

== Locations ==
Bayhealth Medical Center operates two hospitals: Bayhealth Hospital, Kent Campus in Dover and Bayhealth Hospital, Sussex Campus in Milford. In addition, it also operates the Bayhealth Emergency Center, Smyrna in Smyrna. Bayhealth Medical Center also operates several outpatient facilities across central and southern Delaware.

== Services ==
Bayhealth Medical Center has a total of 316 beds. Inpatient services include a birthing room and cardiovascular and cancer services. Bayhealth also offers numerous outpatient services, patient and family support services, community outreach, and imaging services. The Kent Campus and Sussex Campus both have a 24-hour emergency department with a Level III trauma center. In addition, Bayhealth Emergency Center in Smyrna has a 24-hour emergency department.

== History ==
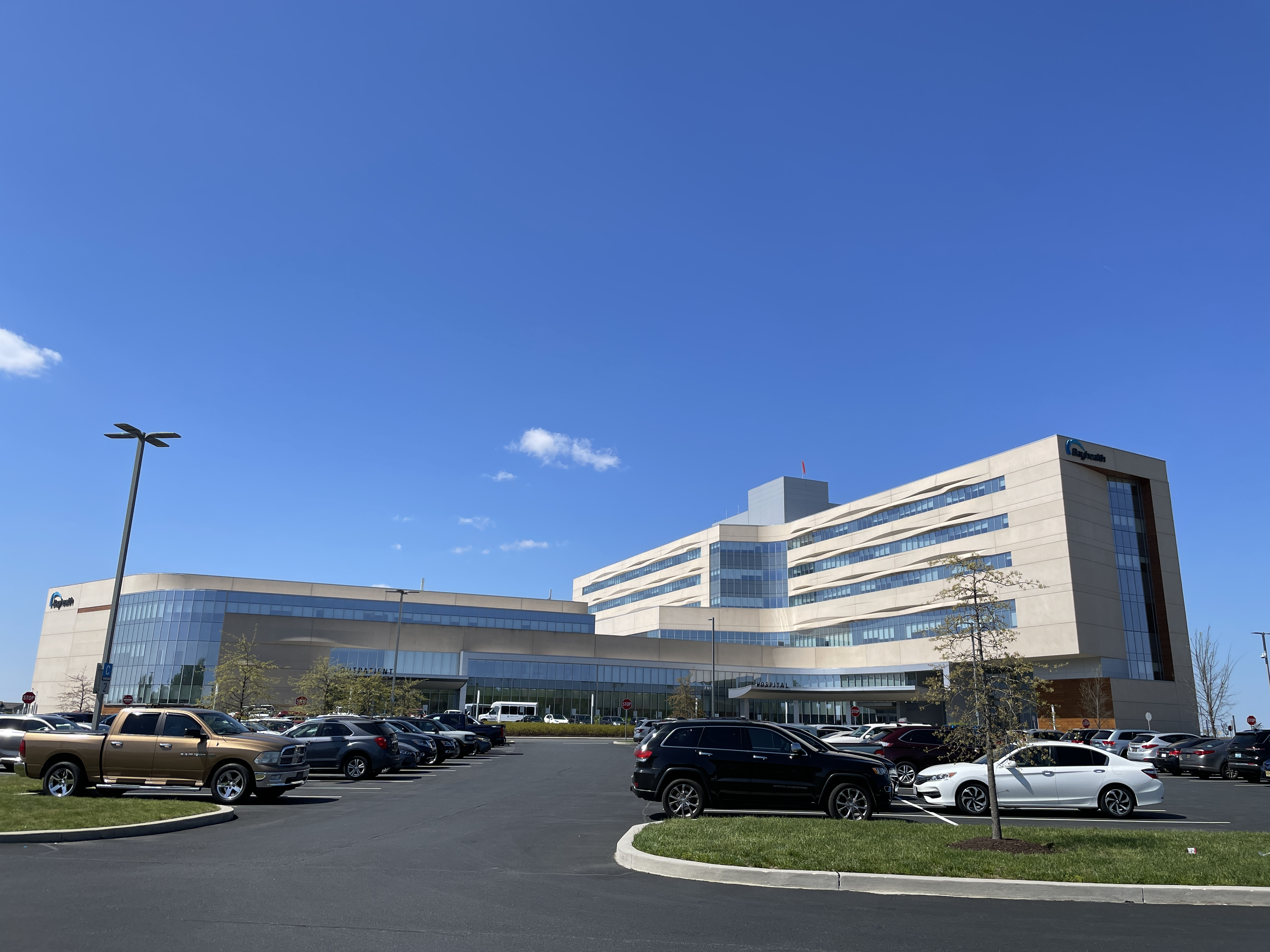
Bayhealth Hospital, Sussex Campus in Milford

In 1921, the Dover Rotary Club launched a fund drive to build a hospital in Dover. The site was chosen in 1925 and Kent General Hospital (now Bayhealth Hospital, Kent Campus) was incorporated. The hospital opened in 1927. Over the years, Kent General Hospital has undergone numerous expansions and service additions to accommodate increasing admissions and to offer better services. The first cardiac surgery was performed at Kent General in 2004. Milford Memorial Hospital opened in 1938 and has undergone numerous expansions and improvements, including the addition of a cancer center in 2002 and an enlarged emergency services department in 2004. The Bayhealth Cancer Institute opened in 2008. In 2009, plans were made to replace Milford Memorial Hospital at its current site.

On May 27, 2016, Bayhealth Medical Center broke ground on a new hospital campus at a new site in Milford that would replace Milford Memorial Hospital. The six-story hospital cost between $275 million and $300 million to build. Bayhealth Sussex Campus, which is composed of Bayhealth Hospital, Sussex Campus and Bayhealth Outpatient Center, Sussex Campus, opened on February 5, 2019. Milford Memorial Hospital will be converted by Nationwide Health Services into a multi-use healthcare-focused community that would include a nursing home.

== Controversies ==
Bayhealth was the owner of Greenwold (Dover, Delaware) at the time of its demolition. Bayhealth staff provided limited options to the community to try to save the house, insisting that it be moved off site for the creation of a staff parking lot. Such actions run counter to the Secretary of the Interior's Standards for the Treatment of Historic Properties and this option was not pursued as the onus was placed on an all-volunteer preservation group, the Friends of Old Dover. Bayhealth demolished the house in 2023.
