= Ellen Imelda Cashman =

Australian trade unionist (1891–1983)

Mel Cashman
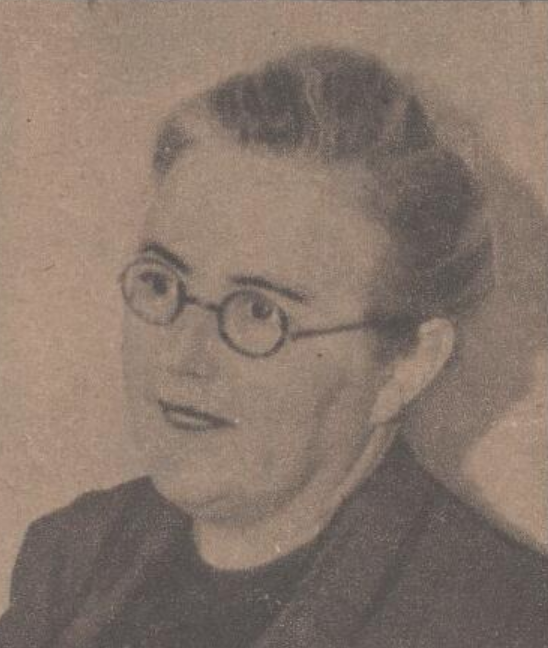
- Cashman in 1943

President of the Printing Trades Women And Girls' Union
- In office 1915–1917

Personal details
- Born: 19 November 1891 Gladesville, Colony of New South Wales
- Died: 11 June 1983 (aged 92) Bexley, New South Wales, Australia
- Resting place: Ryde, New South Wales
- Party: Labor
- Education: St Joseph's College
- Occupation: Trade union organiser
- Known for: First female Commonwealth Arbitration Inspector

Ellen Imelda "Mel" Cashman (19 November 1891–11 June 1983) was an Australian trade union organiser, wartime industrial relations official and the first female Commonwealth Arbitration Inspector.

== Early life and career ==
Cashman was born to Irish immigrant parents in Gladesville, a suburb of Sydney in 1891. After working in several low paid industries, including tailoring and bag-making, Cashman moved into printing. She made a strong impression at a young age, and at 21 was made forewoman of her section at the W C Penfold & Co factory in Redfern.

== Union official ==
At age 24, Cashman was elected president of the Printing Trades Women and Girls' Union. She served in this role from 1915 until the union amalgamated to form the Printing Industry Employees' Union of Australia (PIUEU) in 1917. Following amalgamation, Cashman was elected secretary of the union's women and girls' advisory committee and remained in this role for almost 25 years.

Her role within the PIUEU often included public advocacy and appearing before the Commonwealth Court of Conciliation and Arbitration on wage and workers' rights cases.

She served on the PIUEU board of management and federal council, and was also a delegate to trade union congress, Labor Party conference, and the eight-hour association. Cashman ran for the union presidency in 1923 and 1940, losing narrowly both times.

== Government work and later life ==
In 1940, Cashman was appointed one of seven new Commonwealth arbitration inspectors, nicknamed "factory inspectors," to oversee federal industrial relations compliance in respect to award rates and conditions under the Commonwealth Conciliation and Arbitration Act 1904. She was the only woman to be appointed, and remained the only woman inspector throughout her tenure.

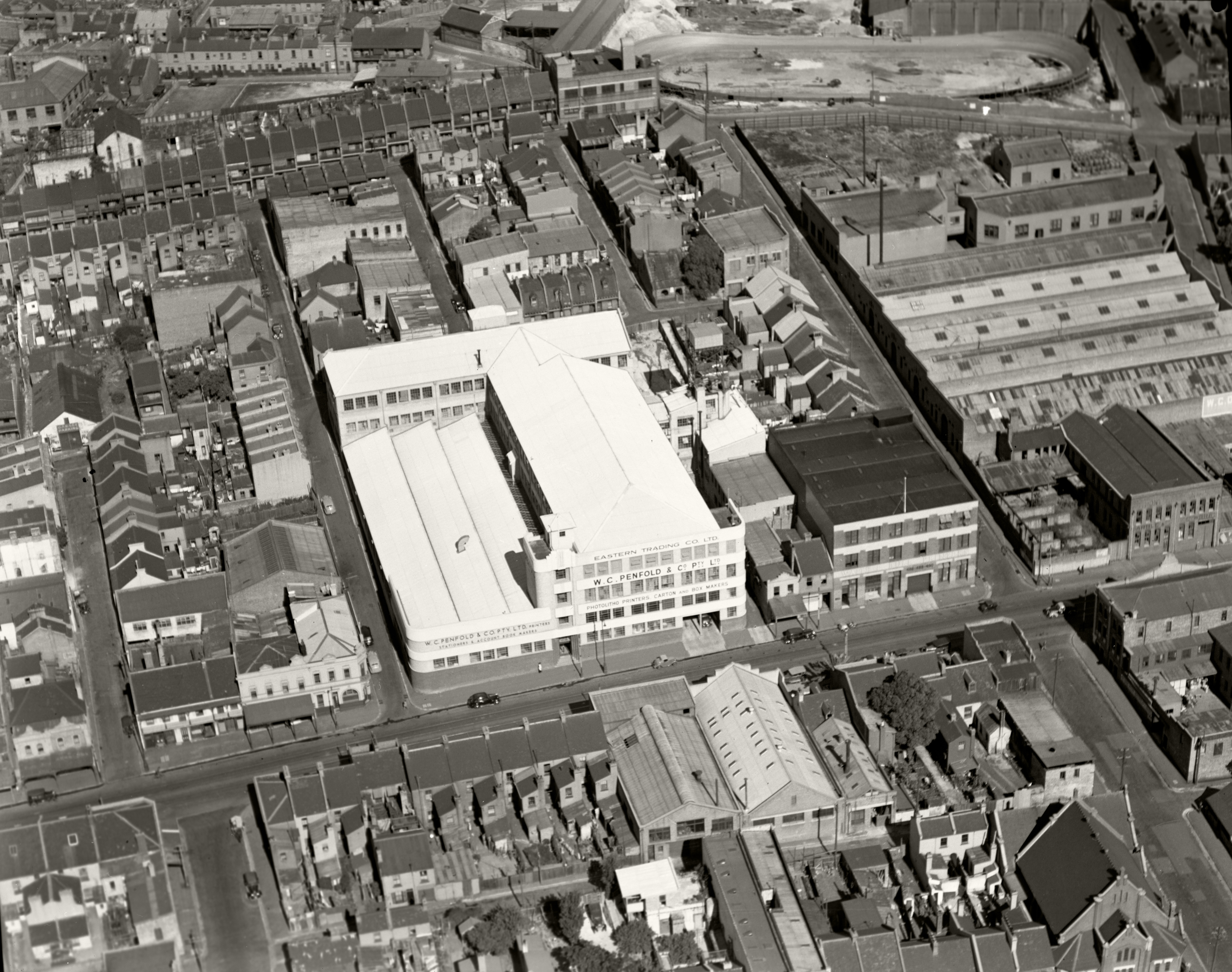
Cashman became forewoman at the W C Penfold and Co Factory in Redfern

Cashman joined the Women’s Australian National Service (WANS) in 1940 and was a member of the New South Wales state board, assisting in mobilising and coordinating women newly employed in traditionally male-only roles as part of the war effort. While engaged with the WANS, Cashman was seconded to the newly formed Department of Labour and National Service to survey conditions in the clothing industry. She remained an arbitration inspector throughout the war.

In 1942, Cashman was appointed by the Curtin government to the Women's Employment Board, a new regulatory body charged with overseeing and setting the wages, hours and conditions of over 70,000 female workers in Australian industries. Although she was initially named to represent employers on the board, Cashman's appointment garnered criticism from employment groups including the Employers' Federation of New South Wales and the Associated Chamber of Manufacturers, fearing her union background made it impossible for her to serve in that capacity. In response to this criticism, the government changed her designation as the Commonwealth's representative on the board.

She resigned as arbitration inspector in 1952 following a period of ill health, however never fully retired and returned to her old job of printing on a casual basis. She died on 11 June 1983 at Bexley, New South Wales and was buried at the Field of Mars cemetery in Ryde.
