= Greer Fay Cashman =

Australian-Israeli journalist

- גריר פיי קשמן
- Born: Melbourne, Australia
- Occupation: Journalist
- Employer: The Jerusalem Post

Greer Fay Cashman (Hebrew: גריר פיי קשמן) is an Australian-Israeli journalist who has written for The Jerusalem Post for more than 40 years.

== Early life and education ==
Cashman was born in Melbourne, Australia to a Polish-Jewish family. Many of her relatives on both sides of the family were killed during the Holocaust, specifically at Treblinka, Auschwitz. She later described herself as being raised in "a Zionist family, a Zionist school, a Zionist youth movement". Her father died a week before she turned eleven. Cashman enjoyed writing from a young age, and became editor of her school's magazine, but struggled with math and science and ultimately never completed high school or attended college.

== Career ==
She worked first as a kindergarten teacher with Chabad, but was disliked by her fellow teachers for her methods. With the help of Chabad, she instead became a switchboard operator for The Australian Jewish News. She also did other administrative work, such as reading proofs, dealing with advertisements, and putting together invitations. On a whim, she submitted a review for a college play to the newspaper, which was published, marking her first foray into journalism.

In 1964, Cashman secured a visa to visit Egypt with the hopes of interviewing then-president Gamal Abdel Nasser. It was her first time traveling overseas. Although she was unable to interview Nasser, she did enjoy the trip and formed connections with the Egyptian-Jewish community. In the late 1960s, Cashman became editor of the Sydney Jewish News. In 1970, Cashman was invited to join the press corps to cover the visit of Pope Paul VI to Australia, as "every ethnic group was allowed to have one representative," and she was the only Yiddish-speaking journalist available.

Cashman moved to Israel in 1973, after the Sydney Jewish News was bought out by the Jewish Times. Six months after her arrival, the Yom Kippur War began, marking the first time Cashman was reporting on wartime events and the first time she encountered censorship while trying to publish. She worked out of the Government Press Office, being able to use their phone lines for free when calling media outlets outside the country.

Cashman began writing for The Jerusalem Post in 1975, and joined their full-time staff in 1981. She first began by covering fashion for the paper, before later moving to reporting on Israeli politics, including the actions of the Israeli president, and starting her weekly column Grapevine.

In 1979 she published the book Jewish Days and Holidays with SBS Publishing.

In 2021, Cashman received the Lifetime Achievement Award from B'nai B'rith International.

== Personal life ==
In 1962, Cashman wrote a letter to James Meredith, an American civil rights activist, expressing her support for his work.

Shortly before the first election of Yitzhak Rabin, Cashman met Dan Landau, a member of the Labor Party and later a photojournalist. The two later married; Cashman's mother died a month after the wedding.

In 1988, Cashman described herself as a "unreconstructed leftist". She criticized Israeli violence against Palestinians during the First Intifada, supporting the idea of land for peace.
