= Sister Jeanne Cashman =

Founder of Sojourners' Place

Sister Jeanne Cashman is the founder and executive director of Sojourners’ Place, a shelter in Delaware for homeless men and women that helps them to get on their feet. Cashman founded Sojourners’ Place in 1991. She took her vows in 1972 and became an educator in New York and at Ursuline Academy in Wilmington, Delaware. Seeing the need for an open ended time frame for homeless people to develop skills, she opened Sojourners’ Place where residents stay, on average, for six to eight months. 70% of the people who stay with them after prison leave successfully. She is also part of the Delaware “God Squad” that fights for interfaith acceptance. Together with Rabbi Peter Grumbacher and the Lutheran Rev. David Mueller she team-teaches a class each February at the Osher Lifelong Learning Institute at the University of Delaware in Wilmington.
