= John Cashman (journalist) =

- Born: 1917; Queens, New York City, New York, U.S.
- Died: July 31, 1945 (aged 27–28); Okinawa, Japan
- Cause of death: Plane crash
- Occupation: War correspondent
- Parent: Mrs. Mary M. Cashman

John Robert Cashman (died July 31, 1945) was an American war correspondent for the International News Service who covered the Pacific theatre during World War II. He was killed in an aircraft accident on Okinawa on July 31, 1945.

== Biography ==
The son of Mrs. Mary M. Cashman. of 87-51 86th Street, Queens, New York, John Cashman graduated high school at Richmond Hill High School in 1935.

He enlisted in the U.S. Navy immediately for a four-year term, and spent two years in China, where, though still attached to the Navy, he wrote a sports column covering Navy boxing matches for the Shanghai Globe-Mercury. Cashman was on the crew of the USS Augusta, then flagship of the Asiatic Fleet, the vessel on which President Truman sailed to Potsdam.

Cashman's enlistment expired in 1939, but he reenlisted in 1942. "In May of that year he lost his left arm as a result of an ammunition explosion while he was on sea duty in the Atlantic, and was honorably discharged in December 1942."

His arm was amputated from severe wounds he received when a gun misfired. "It was while recovering from the amputation in his New York home that he decided to do something about his desire to be a journalist."

He then became a sports writer for the International News Service, hoping to go back to war in the role of a correspondent. He was sent to Guam in February 1945 and then to Manila, where he volunteered to accompany a regiment into battle in the Borneo invasion, he covered the Australian invasion of Balikpapen successfully.

=== Death ===
While returning to his INS headquarters on Guam from Borneo, he had reached Okinawa on July 30, 1945. On July 31, the Consolidated B-24 Liberator he was aboard crashed and exploded on takeoff, killing Cashman, 27, and the crew of eight. A military funeral with honours attended by high-ranking Naval officers was held on Okinawa for Cashman on August 1, 1945.

Cashman was the 17th war correspondent killed in the Pacific theater.

=== Family ===
At the time of Cashman's death, he had two brothers serving in the U.S. Navy, Ensign George A. Cashman, 22, commander of a minesweeper off of San Francisco, and Robert, 23, an aviation machinist's mate first class, who was in the Pacific for 20 months, but now assigned at Naval Air Station Kingsville, Texas.

He was also survived by two sisters, both wives of Naval lieutenants, Mrs. Sumner Thompson, of Wollaston, Massachusetts, and Mrs. Vernice Cheek, of San Diego, California.

=== Commemoration ===
Cashman is one of over a dozen UP, INS and UPI journalists' names included on a Freedom Forum Journalists Memorial dedicated in Arlington, Virginia, in May 1996.
