= Ursuline Academy (Delaware) =

Location
- 1106 Pennsylvania Avenue; Wilmington, New Castle County, Delaware 19806; United States; 39°45′10″N 75°33′32″W

Information
- Type: Private, independent
- Motto: Serviam (I will serve)
- Religious affiliations: Catholic; Ursulines
- Patron saint: St. Angela Merici
- Established: 1893 (133 years ago)
- CEEB code: 080210
- President: Trisha Medeiros
- Principal: Jennifer Anthony (upper school); Lisa Clody (middle school); Samantha Varano (lower school)
- Grades: Montessori 3,4,5, Kindergarten, 1st - 12th grade
- Colors: Red and white
- Mascot: Raider
- Accreditation: Middle States Association of Colleges and Schools
- Tuition: $9,725 -$30,945
- Website: www.ursuline.org

Ursuline Academy is a private school in Wilmington, Delaware, which offers Early Childhood (Montessori (ages 2.5–5) and Kindergarten) and elementary (grades 1–5) school for both girls and boys, Middle (Grades 6–8), and Upper (Grades 9–12) school classes for girls. Established in 1893 by the Ursulines, it is an independent, Catholic, college-preparatory school.

== Notable alumni ==
- Erin Arvedlund, financial journalist
- Valerie Biden Owens, political strategist, sister of President Joe Biden
- Vera Gilbride Davis, Delaware politician
- Elena Delle Donne, WNBA player for the Washington Mystics; played collegiately at the University of Delaware
- Aubrey Plaza, actress, comedian, and producer
- Marjorie Rendell, federal judge and former first lady for the State of Pennsylvania
- Val Whiting, former WNBA player; athletic hall of fame inductee at Stanford University
