= Janice Nevin =

Executive

- Education: Harvard University, Thomas Jefferson University (MD), University of Pittsburgh (MPH)
- Title: President and CEO, ChristianaCare

Janice E. Nevin is an executive who in 2014 became President and CEO of ChristianaCare Health System. She is the first woman to be the head of Delaware's largest hospital system.

== Early life and education ==
Nevin was raised in Delaware after and moving to the United States from England in 1970. Her father was a priest and her mother worked as a secretary in the school district.

Nevin graduated from St. Andrew's School in Middletown, Delaware. She graduated from Harvard University in 1981, and then attended Thomas Jefferson University medical college where she earned her M.D. in 1987. She specialized in family medicine and was the residency director at Sidney Kimmel Medical College. She also earned a Masters in Public Health from the University of Pittsburgh in 1992.

== Career ==
Nevin and co-authors have published on primary care within a community, preventative care for children and menopausal women. In 2002 she joined Christiana Care as the senior vice president of their Wilmington campus. She served as the chief medical and patient safety officer, before being named as CEO in 2014.

During a podcast hosted by the Academy Table, Nevin described the arc of her career, women and leadership, and the COVID-19 pandemic. In a 2021 conversation at the National Academy of Medicine, Nevin shared her work in preventing burnout in clinicians during the pandemic. Janice Nevin to Retire After Transformational Tenure and Jenn Schwartz Named Successor

== Awards and honors ==
In 2017, Nevin was inducted into the Hall of Fame of Delaware Women along with Carolyn Berger, Debra Heffernan, Kendall M. Wilson. That year she also received the Grassroots Champion Award for Delaware from the American Hospital Association and the David G. Menser award from the Wilmington Senior Center for her contribution to the community. In 2018, Nevin was honored with the Amethyst Ball Humanitarian Award from Limen House, a sober living residence in Delaware. In 2020, the Del-Mar-va Council of the Boy Scouts of America named her the Citizen of the Year and Connected World honored her as one of fifty women of technology for her work at ChristianaCare using technology during interactions with patients during the COVID-19 pandemic.
