= Jack Cashman (author) =

Irish-American author

Jack Cashman is an Irish-American author. He has published three books, An Irish Immigrant Story, Three Steps to the Making of an Assassin, and Democracy: The Final Nail. The first chronicles the struggles of an Irish immigrant family and Ireland's drive for independence, the second analyzes the Vietnam War's impact on two friends from a New England mill town, and the third explores the shifting principles of American democracy.

Prior to becoming a novelist, Cashman served as commissioner of Maine's Department of Economic and Community Development and chairman of the Maine Public Utilities Commission.

== Personal life ==
Cashman lives in Hampden, Maine with his wife, Betty.
