= Emalea Pusey Warner =

American suffragist

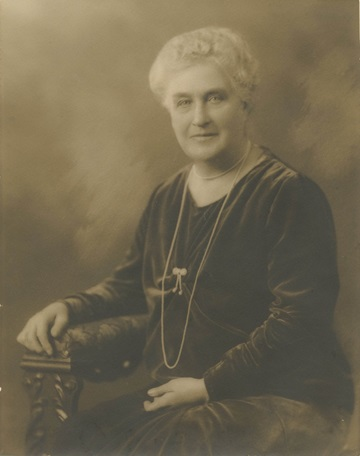
- Emalea P. Warner
- Born: June 21, 1853; Yorklyn, Delaware
- Died: April 13, 1948 (aged 94); Wilmington, Delaware
- Occupation(s): Educator, clubwoman, suffragist

Emalea Pusey Warner (June 21, 1853 – April 13, 1948) was an American educator, clubwoman, and suffragist. She was the first president of the Delaware State Federation of Women's Clubs in 1898, and in 1927 she was the first woman appointed a trustee of the University of Delaware. She was inducted into the Delaware Women's Hall of Fame in 1982.

== Early life and education ==
Emalea Pusey was born in Yorklyn, Delaware, the daughter of Lea Pusey and Anna Kersey Pusey. Her father was a cotton manufacturer. Her family were Quakers. She attended Wilmington Friends School.

== Career ==
Warner helped organize Associated Charities of Wilmington, and later the Wilmington New Century Club, a women's club that sponsored cultural events and raised money for kindergartens, libraries, school lunch programs and other community causes. In 1898, she became the first president of the Delaware State Federation of Women's Clubs.

In 1911, Warner succeeded in lobbying for the creation of a Women's College at the University of Delaware. She served on the school's building committee and in 1927 became the first woman trustee at the university. In 1940, a dormitory on the campus of the University of Delaware was named Warner Hall in her honor.

Warner was vice-president of the Delaware Woman's Suffrage Association, president of the Delaware chapter of the League of Women Voters, and president of the state's Society for the Prevention of Cruelty to Animals for over 20 years.

== Personal life ==
Emalea Pusey married businessman Alfred DuPont Warner. They had five children together; her husband died in 1915. Emalea P. Warner died in 1948, in Wilmington, Delaware, aged 94 years. The University of Delaware gives an annual Emalea P. Warner Award to an outstanding woman graduate. An elementary school in Wilmington is named in her memory. In 1982 she was posthumously inducted into the Delaware Women's Hall of Fame.
