= ChristianaCare =

Hospital network in Delaware

- Formation: 1888
- Headquarters: Wilmington, Delaware
- Coordinates: 39°41′10″N 75°40′19″W
- Region served: Delaware, Maryland, Pennsylvania, and New Jersey
- Services: Health System
- Leader: Janice Nevin
- Website: christianacare.org

ChristianaCare is a network of private, non-profit hospitals providing health care services to all of the U.S. state of Delaware and portions of seven counties bordering the state in Pennsylvania, Maryland and New Jersey. The system includes two hospitals in Delaware, Wilmington Hospital and Christiana Hospital, and one in Maryland, ChristianaCare Union Hospital in Elkton. ChristianaCare operates the Helen F. Graham Cancer Center & Research Institute, the Center for Heart & Vascular Health, The Center for Women & Children's Health, and ChristianaCare HomeHealth, as well as the Eugene du Pont Preventive Medicine & Rehabilitation Center, and a wide range of outpatient and satellite services. ChristianaCare is headquartered in Wilmington, Delaware.

== History ==
The system's history dates to 1888, when Delaware Hospital was first opened in Wilmington. It was expanded throughout the subsequent decades. In 1965, it merged with Memorial Hospital and Wilmington General Hospital to form Wilmington Medical Center, with each of the three facilities being known as a "division", thus Delaware Hospital became known as the Delaware Division of the Wilmington Medical Center. Later, it was decided to close the other two hospitals and replace them with a new one, Christiana Hospital. In 1985, the Delaware Division was renamed Wilmington Hospital.

In 2014, family medicine physician Janice E. Nevin, M.D., MPH, became president and CEO of the health system. Under Dr. Nevin, the health system focused on excellence and love and focusing on empowering coworkers to speak up about potentially problematic behavior by others in the work environment. The health care system developed CareVio, a patient centered and clinician-led information technology enhanced care coordination service, that was designed to provide information and scheduling aid in 2017.

In 2023 ChristianaCare paid $47.7 million to settle a fraud claim brought under the False Claims Act.

=== Demographics ===
In 2007, ChristianaCare saw 457,348 outpatient visits, 55,512 admissions and 7,100 childbirths. ChristianaCare provided $35.7 million in charity care in 2007. With more than 10,000 employees, it is one of the largest private employers in Delaware and among the top 10 in the greater Philadelphia region. In 2017 it was reported that the Health Care system was ranked as the 22nd leading hospital and the 11th on the East Coast in terms of admissions.

== Location of medical facilities ==
=== Christiana Hospital ===
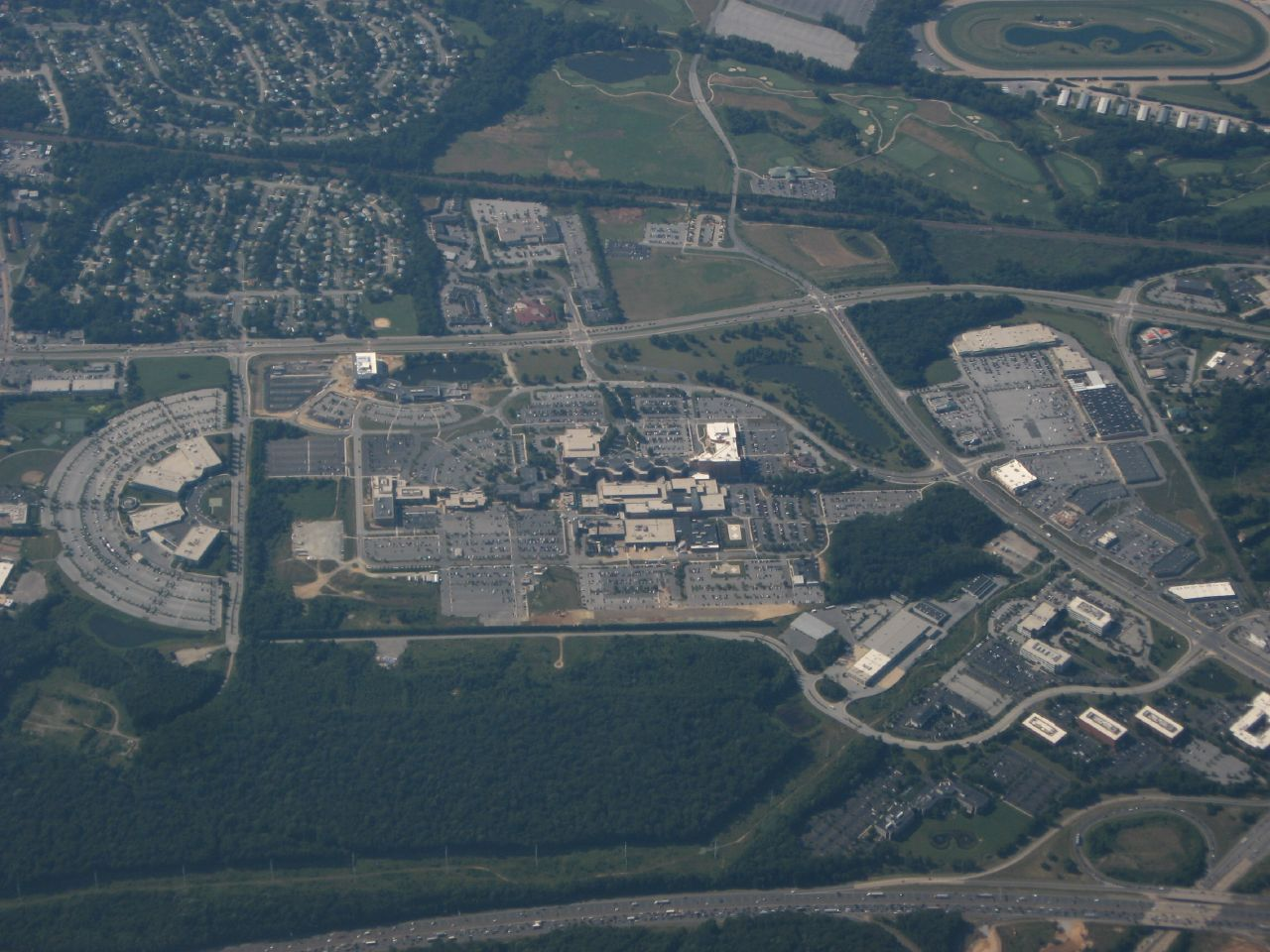
Aerial view of the Christiana Hospital campus in Newark

Christiana Hospital in Newark, Delaware, is Delaware's only adult Level I trauma center. It was built in 1985 and houses 907 licensed beds and includes 22 hospital-based operating rooms and 10 outpatient operating rooms. It is home to Delaware's only Level 3 neonatal intensive care unit and the state's largest maternity center, where more than 7,100 newborns are delivered each year. The Christiana Hospital campus is also home to the Center for Heart & Vascular Health and the Helen F. Graham Cancer Center. In 2018, the hospital opened Delaware's first epilepsy monitoring unit, where doctors attempt to induce a seizure to make a proper diagnosis.

Notable surgeons include Dr. Velma Scantlebury-White, the United States' first African American woman to become a transplant surgeon.

During the COVID-19 pandemic, in mid-December 2020, Delaware resident president-elect Joe Biden received his first vaccination at Christiana Hospital on live TV and returned in mid-January 2021 for his second shot.

=== Wilmington Hospital ===
Wilmington Hospital

Geography
- Location: Wilmington, Delaware
- Coordinates: 39°45′04″N 75°33′00″W

Organisation
- Type: General

Services
- Standards: JSTS
- Emergency department: Level III Trauma Center
- Beds: 321

History
- Constructed: 1970s
- Opened: 1980

Links
- Website: christianacare.org/facilities/wilmingtonhospital

Wilmington Hospital houses 321 licensed beds and is home to ChristianaCare's Center for Rehabilitation and Center for Advanced Joint Replacement. Its campus is also home to the Roxana Cannon Arsht Surgicenter, Wilmington Hospital Health Center, an HIV program and the First State School, a private/public partnership that provides in-school education for children with serious illnesses that would otherwise render them homebound. Plans for a $250 million expansion project were announced in 2007 that will include room for 90 new patient beds, new operating room suites, an expanded emergency department and much more.

Since 2019, Wilmington Hospital houses the Center for Hope and Healing which strives to provide care for individuals struggling with mental illness, medical conditions, and social health issues. In February 2021, the Delaware Health Resources Board cleared the Delaware Neurosurgical Group PA and ChristianaCare's joint spinal surgery center, named Center for Spine Surgery LLC. This center, located at Roxana Cannon Arsht Surgicenter on the Wilmington Hospital campus, will contain 6 operating rooms, 6 overnight rooms, a post-surgical recovery space and 23-hour stay capacity for spine surgical patients. The projected opening date is January 2022.

On June 16, 2026, a shooting occurred at Wilmington Hospital. The perpetrator, 23-year-old John Wallace-Bey of New Castle, Delaware, killed a 19-year-old man and injured another man, before fleeing to Philadelphia where he was arrested in the Olney neighborhood.

=== Middletown Free-standing Emergency Department ===
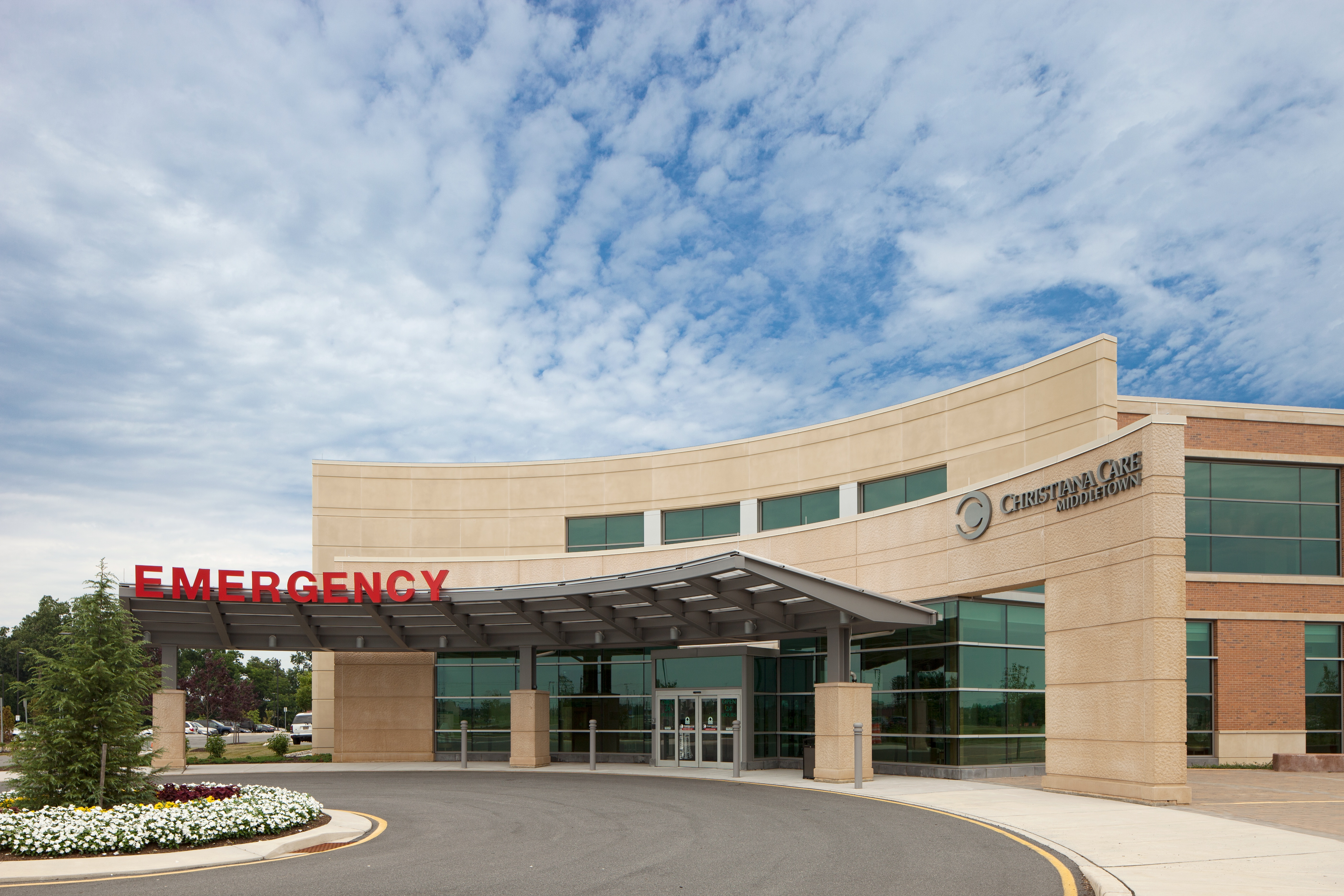
ChristianaCare Emergency Department — Middletown, DE

The Middletown Free-standing Emergency Department located in Middletown, Delaware offers 24-hour emergency care with 18 treatment rooms. It opened in April 2013 at a cost of $34 million.

In 2019, after a compliance review, the emergency department earned Advanced Disease-Specific Care Certification as an Acute Stroke Ready Hospital from The Joint Commission.

Location: 39°27′22″N 75°41′01″W

=== Union Hospital ===
Union Hospital

Geography
- Location: Elkton, Maryland
- Coordinates: 39°36′33″N 75°50′00″W

Services
- Beds: 72

History
- Opened: originally on December 1, 1908

Links
- Website: www.uhcc.com

In 2020, ChristianaCare officially acquired Union Hospital of Elkton, Maryland along with its parent health system, Affinity Health Alliance, and its subsidiaries. This acquisition is the first hospital ChristianaCare owns outside the state of Delaware. The hospital, known as ChristianaCare, Union Hospital, adds 72 beds, six operating rooms and 375 physicians to the ChristianaCare health system. It will provide care in various specialties such as oncology, gastroenterology and audiology, in addition to its imaging and laboratories technology.

=== Other locations ===
Other ChristianaCare facilities include:

- Concord Health Center, Chadds Ford, Pennsylvania, 39°50′49″N 75°32′12″W
- ChristianaSurgiCenter, Newark, Delaware, 39°41′11″N 75°40′19″W
- Helen F. Graham Cancer Center and Research Institute, Newark, Delaware, 39°41′17″N 75°40′29″W
- Healthcare Center at Christiana, Newark, Delaware, 39°41′34″N 75°40′30″W
- Smyrna Health and Wellness Center, Smyrna, Delaware, 39°17′59″N 75°36′16″W
- Eugene du Pont Preventive Medicine & Rehabilitation Institute, Wilmington, Delaware, 39°46′10″N 75°35′22″W

== Graduate medical education ==
ChristianaCare is a nationally recognized, urban and suburban, academic and community hospital. The health system has been involved in graduate medical education for over 100 years.

There are over 10 ACGME-accredited residency programs, including Diagnostic Radiology, Emergency Medicine, Family Medicine, General Surgery, Internal Medicine, Obstetrics/Gynecology, Oral & Maxillofacial Surgery, and Podiatry. ChristianaCare also offers combined programs, including Emergency Medicine/Family Medicine, Emergency Medicine/Internal Medicine, and Medicine-Pediatrics. Besides residency programs, several fellowship programs are also offered. Other programs include General Practice Dentistry and Pharmacy.

In regards to medical schools, ChristianaCare is affiliated with The Sidney Kimmel Medical College of the Thomas Jefferson University, and is their largest teaching affiliate. It houses up to 30 medical students, who live and complete their entire third and fourth year curricula in Delaware. In 2018, ChristianaCare started a new affiliation with the Philadelphia College of Osteopathic Medicine to be one of its clinical campuses for third year medical students with a class size of 11 students.

== See also ==
- List of hospitals in Delaware
