= Christiana Hospital =

- ChristianaCare

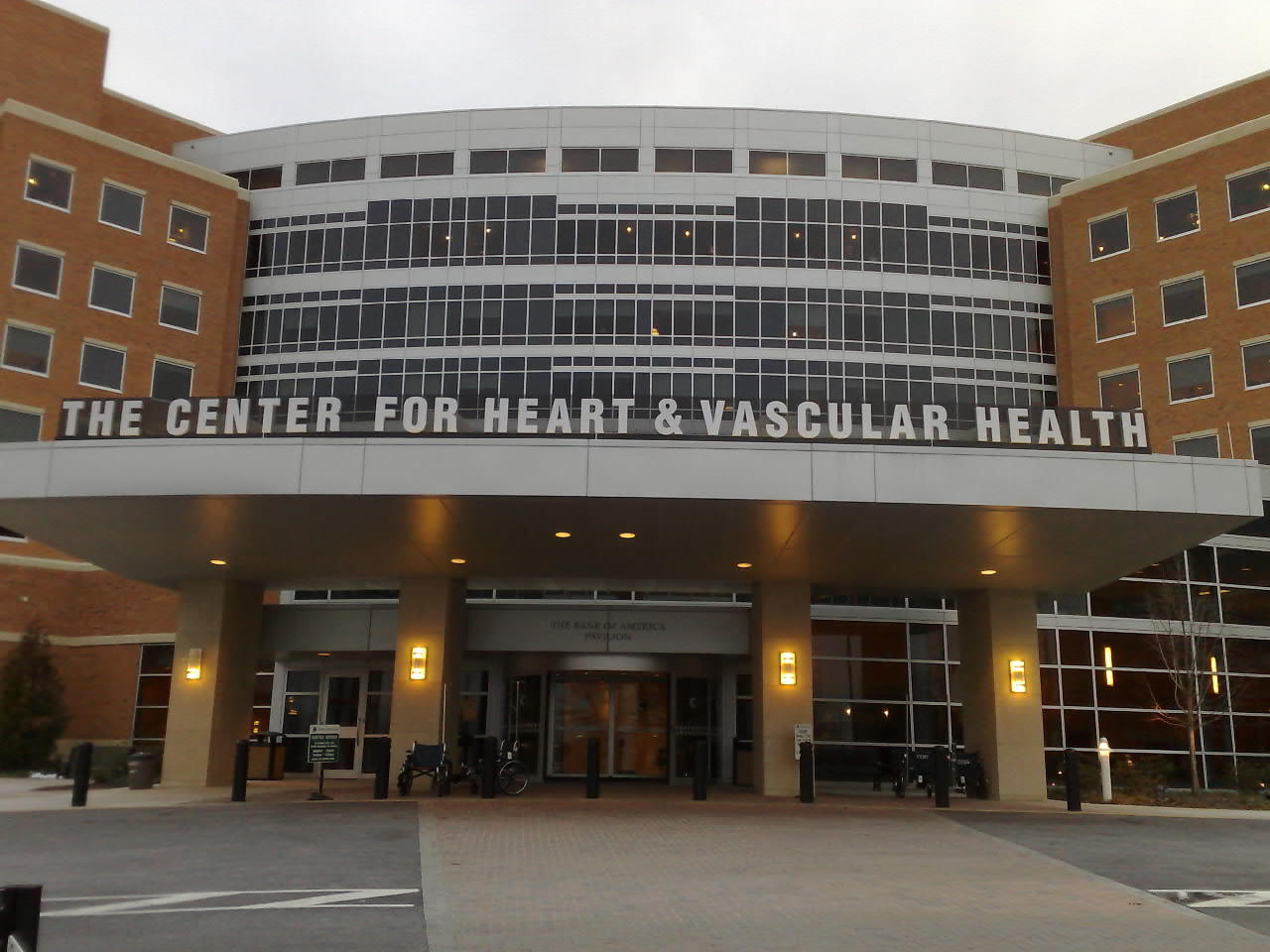
- The entrance to the heart health wing.

Geography
- Location: 4755 Ogletown Stanton Road, Newark, Delaware, United States
- Coordinates: 39°41′17″N 75°40′4″W

Organization
- Type: Teaching
- Affiliated university: Sidney Kimmel Medical College and the Philadelphia College of Osteopathic Medicine

Services
- Emergency department: Level I trauma center
- Beds: 906

Helipads
- Helipad: FAA LID: 1DE4
Number	Length		Surface
Number	ft	m	Surface
H1	50 x 50	15 x 15	concrete

History
- Opened: 1985

Links
- Website: christianacare.org/facilities/christianahospital/
- Lists: Hospitals in Delaware

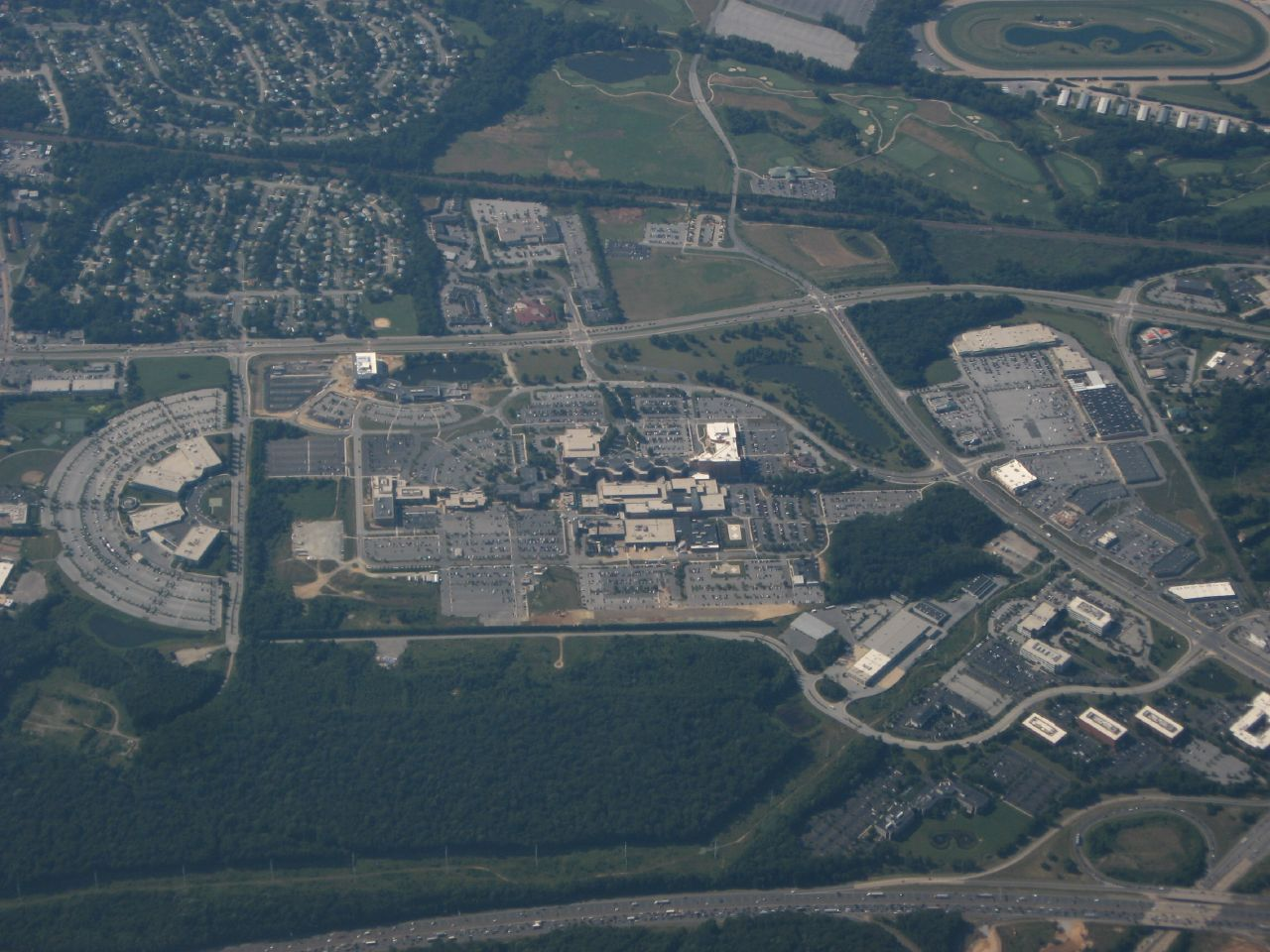
Aerial view of the hospital campus in Newark

Christiana Hospital is a 1,039-bed nationally ranked, non-profit, tertiary, research and academic medical center located in Stanton, Newark, Delaware, servicing the entire Delaware area and parts of southern New Jersey. Christiana Hospital is the region's only university-level tertiary academic medical center. The hospital is affiliated with the Sidney Kimmel Medical College of Thomas Jefferson University and the Philadelphia College of Osteopathic Medicine. Christiana Hospital is owned by ChristianaCare as the flagship hospital of the system. Christiana Hospital is also a ACS designated level I trauma center, the only in Delaware. In addition, the hospital has a helipad to handle critical medevac patients. Christiana Hospital also features an AAP-verified, level III neonatal intensive care unit with 60 bassinets.

The Christiana Hospital campus is also home to the Center for Heart & Vascular Health and the Helen F. Graham Cancer Center.

== History ==
The hospital's history dates to 1888, when Delaware Hospital was first opened in Wilmington. It was expanded throughout the subsequent decades. In 1965, it merged with Memorial Hospital and Wilmington General Hospital to form Wilmington Medical Center, with each of the three facilities being known as a "division", thus Delaware Hospital became known as the Delaware Division of the Wilmington Medical Center. Later it was decided to close the other two hospitals and replace them with a new one, Christiana Hospital. In 1985, the Delaware Division was renamed Wilmington Hospital. Also in 1985, the current day Christiana Hospital at its current location opened.

In October 2006, the Christiana Hospital trauma center was one of the receiving hospitals' for victims of the West Nickel Mines School shooting in Lancaster County, Pennsylvania, treating one of the pediatric victims from the shooting.

In 2015, an expansion was announced designed specifically for women and children. In 2017 the hospital began a large 400,000 square foot expansion, adding a new women and children's wing to the hospital. By 2018, the steel framing work for the hospital finished.

In 2018, the hospital opened Delaware's first epilepsy monitoring unit, where doctors attempt to induce a seizure to make a proper diagnosis.

In June 2020, Christiana Hospital completed the $260 million, Center for Women's & Children's Health tower. The new addition includes a new all-private neonatal intensive care unit (NICU), new labor suites and new postpartum rooms, and a family garden. Additionally, the new building hosts two Ronald McDonald family rooms for use by parents of children in the NICU.

In late 2020, President-elect Joe Biden received his first dose of the Pfizer–BioNTech COVID-19 vaccine at the Christiana Hospital. He later returned for his second dose at the hospital in early 2021.

== Awards ==
In 2019, Christiana Hospital was the only hospital in the state to be named to the Becker's Hospital Review list of "100 great hospitals in America".

In 2020, Christiana Hospital was ranked as #92 overall (and #1 in Delaware) on the Newsweek list of the best hospitals in the United States. In 2020 the hospital also received the "Most Wired" designation from the College of Healthcare Information Management Executives. In 2020 the hospital was also named as an "A" hospital by the Leapfrog Group.

Christiana Hospital is consistently recognized by many publications as the best hospital in Delaware. The hospital ranked nationally in one adult specialties and high performing in four specialties as the #1 best hospital in Delaware on the 2020-21 U.S. News & World Report: Best Hospitals rankings.

2020-21 U.S. News & World Report Rankings for Christiana Hospital
Specialty	Rank (In the U.S.)	Score (Out of 100)
Gastroenterology & GI Surgery	High Performing	57.5
Gynecology	#24	70.8
Neurology & Neurosurgery	High Performing	55.0
Orthopedics	High Performing	50.1
Urology	High Performing	52.3

== See also ==
- Thomas Jefferson University
- ChristianaCare
- Trauma center
