= 1954 United States Senate elections =

- September 13 (Note: Maine held its election in September) & November 2, 1954
- Class 2

38 of the 96 seats in the United States Senate 49 seats needed for a majority
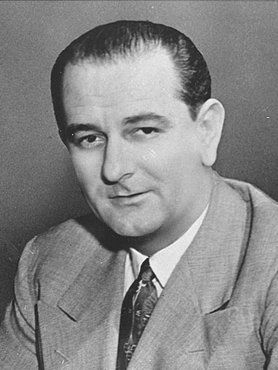

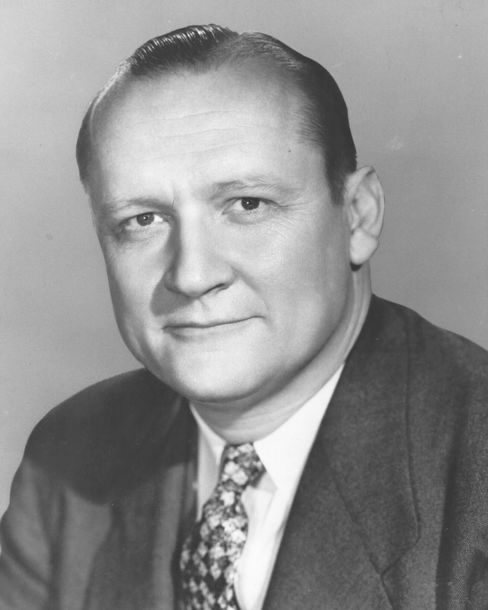
	Majority party	Minority party
Leader	Lyndon Johnson	William Knowland
Party	Democratic	Republican
Leader since	January 3, 1953	August 4, 1953
Leader's seat	Texas	California
Seats before	46	49
Seats after	48	47
Seat change	▲2	▼2
Popular vote	15,137,069	12,585,368
Percentage	53.9%	44.8%
Seats up	22	16
Races won	24	14
	Third party
Party	Independent
Seats before	1
Seats after	1 (Note: Independent Wayne Morse, who sided with the Republicans in the last Congress to allow them to keep control of the Senate, began caucusing with the Democrats at the start of this next Congress on January 3, 1955.)
Seat change	Steady
Seats up	0
Races won	0
- Results of the elections: Democratic gain Democratic hold Republican gain Republican hold No election Rectangular inset (Neb., N. H. & N. C.): both seats up for election
Majority Leader before election
Bill Knowland
Republican
Elected Majority Leader
Lyndon Johnson
Democratic

The 1954 United States Senate elections was a midterm election in the first term of Dwight D. Eisenhower's presidency. The 32 Senate seats of Class 2 were contested in regular elections, and six special elections were held to fill vacancies. Eisenhower's Republican party lost a net of two seats to the Democratic opposition. This small change was just enough to give Democrats control of the chamber with the help of the Independent (Wayne Morse of Oregon) who at the start of this Congress in January 1955 agreed to caucus with them; he later officially joined the party in April 1955.

Until 2026, this was the last time a party lost control of the Senate just two years after flipping it.

== Events of the election ==
The Republican reversal was attributed in part to the backlash against GOP-driven McCarthyism and the numerous controversies it spawned, including the Army–McCarthy hearings. Other factors included a comment made in Detroit by Defense Secretary Charles Wilson, former president of General Motors, equating unemployed auto workers with "lazy kennel dogs who sit... and yell."

However, it has been pointed out that losses in the midterm election were considerably less than the White House party generally faces in the midterm elections, and this has been attributed to the overall popularity of President Eisenhower, who participated in the campaign along with Vice-president Richard Nixon and other members of the cabinet.

The elections resulted in a divided government that continued to the end of Eisenhower's presidency and a Democratic majority that would last until 1981. As of 2026, this is the last Senate election cycle in which a state (both Nebraska and North Carolina) had to hold three simultaneous elections (two special elections and one regular election) due to the near-simultaneous deaths of both incumbent Senators.

== Results summary ==
↓
48	1	47
Democratic	I	Republican

Colored shading indicates party with largest share of that row.

Parties					Total
Parties	Democratic	Republican	Independent	Other	Total
Last elections (1952)	47	49	0	0	96
Before these elections	46	49	1	0	96
Not up	24	33	0	1	58
Up	22	16	0	—	38
Class 2 (1948→1954)	20	12	—	—	32
Special: Class 1	0	1	—	—	1
Special: Class 3	2	3	—	—	5
Incumbent retired	2	4	—	—	6
Held by same party	1	3	—	—	4
Replaced by other party	▼1 Republican replaced by ▲1 Democrat ▼1 Democrat replaced by ▲1 Republican		—	—	2
Result	2	4	0	0	6
Incumbent ran	20	12	—	—	32
Won re-election	17	7	—	—	24
Lost re-election	▼4 Republicans replaced by ▲4 Democrats ▼2 Democrats replaced by ▲2 Republicans		—	—	6
Lost renomination but held by same party	1	1	—	—	2
Result	22	10	0	0	32
Total elected	24	14	0	0	38
Net change	▲2	▼2	Steady	Steady	2
Nationwide vote	15,137,069	12,585,368	35,661	323,147	28,081,245
Share	53.90%	44.82%	0.13%	1.15%	100%
Result	48	47	1	0	96

Source: Clerk of the U.S. House of Representatives

== Gains, losses and holds ==
=== Retirements ===
One Republican and one Democrat retired instead of seeking re-election. Two Republicans and one Democrat also retired instead of finishing the unexpired term.

State	Senator	Replaced by
Colorado	Edwin C. Johnson	Gordon Allott
Nebraska (regular)	Eva Bowring	Carl Curtis
Nebraska (special, class 1)	Samuel W. Reynolds	Roman Hruska
Nebraska (special, class 2)	Eva Bowring	Hazel Abel
New Jersey	Robert C. Hendrickson	Clifford P. Case
South Carolina	Charles E. Daniel	Strom Thurmond
Wyoming	Edward D. Crippa	Joseph C. O'Mahoney

=== Defeats ===
Three Republicans and two Democrats sought re-election, and two Republicans and one Democrat also sought election to finish the unexpired term, but lost in the primary or general election.

State	Senator	Replaced by
Iowa	Guy Gillette	Thomas E. Martin
Kentucky	John Sherman Cooper	Alben W. Barkley
Michigan	Homer S. Ferguson	Patrick V. McNamara
Nevada (special)	Ernest S. Brown	Alan Bible
New Hampshire (special)	Robert W. Upton	Norris Cotton
North Carolina (reg. and sp., Cl. 2)	Alton Lennon	W. Kerr Scott
Ohio (special)	Thomas A. Burke	George H. Bender
Oregon	Guy Cordon	Richard L. Neuberger

=== Party entrance ===
Wayne Morse (I-OR) who caucused with the Democrats, officially joined the party in April 1955.

State	Senator	Replaced by
Oregon	Wayne Morse	Wayne Morse

=== Post-election changes ===
State	Senator	Replaced by
Kentucky	Alben W. Barkley	Robert Humphreys
South Carolina	Strom Thurmond	Thomas A. Wofford
West Virginia	Harley M. Kilgore	William Laird III

== Change in composition ==
=== Before the elections ===
		D_{1}	D_{2}	D_{3}	D_{4}	D_{5}	D_{6}	D_{7}	D_{8}
D_{18}	D_{17}	D_{16}	D_{15}	D_{14}	D_{13}	D_{12}	D_{11}	D_{10}	D_{9}
D_{19}	D_{20}	D_{21}	D_{22}	D_{23}	D_{24}	D_{25} Ala. Ran	D_{26} Ark. Ran	D_{27} Colo. Retired	D_{28} Del. Ran
D_{38} N.C. (sp 3); Ran	D_{37} N.C. (reg); N.C. (sp 2); Ran	D_{36} N.M. Ran	D_{35} Mont. Ran	D_{34} Miss. Ran	D_{33} Minn. Ran	D_{32} La. Ran	D_{31} Iowa; Ran	D_{30} Ill. Ran	D_{29} Ga. Ran
D_{39} Ohio (sp); Ran	D_{40} Okla. Ran	D_{41} R.I. Ran	D_{42} S.C. Retired	D_{43} Tenn. Ran	D_{44} Texas; Ran	D_{45} Va. Ran	D_{46} W.Va. Ran	I_{1}	R_{49} Wyo. (reg); Wyo. (sp); Retired
Majority →									R_{49} Wyo. (reg); Wyo. (sp); Retired
R_{39} Mass. Ran	R_{40} Mich. Ran	R_{41} Neb. (reg); Neb. (sp 2); Retired	R_{42} Neb. (sp 1); Retired	R_{43} Nev. (sp); Ran	R_{44} N.H. (reg); Ran	R_{45} N.H. (sp); Ran	R_{46} N.J. Retired	R_{47} Ore. Ran	R_{48} S.D. Ran
R_{38} Me. Ran	R_{37} Ky. Ran	R_{36} Kan. Ran	R_{35} Idaho; Ran	R_{34} Calif. (sp); Ran	R_{33}	R_{32}	R_{31}	R_{30}	R_{29}
R_{19}	R_{20}	R_{21}	R_{22}	R_{23}	R_{24}	R_{25}	R_{26}	R_{27}	R_{28}
R_{18}	R_{17}	R_{16}	R_{15}	R_{14}	R_{13}	R_{12}	R_{11}	R_{10}	R_{9}
		R_{1}	R_{2}	R_{3}	R_{4}	R_{5}	R_{6}	R_{7}	R_{8}

=== Results of the elections ===
		D_{1}	D_{2}	D_{3}	D_{4}	D_{5}	D_{6}	D_{7}	D_{8}
D_{18}	D_{17}	D_{16}	D_{15}	D_{14}	D_{13}	D_{12}	D_{11}	D_{10}	D_{9}
D_{19}	D_{20}	D_{21}	D_{22}	D_{23}	D_{24}	D_{25} Ala. Re-elected	D_{26} Ark. Re-elected	D_{27} Del. Re-elected	D_{28} Ga. Re-elected
D_{38} R.I. Re-elected	D_{37} Okla. Re-elected	D_{36} N.C. (sp 3); Elected (Note: Appointee elected)	D_{35} N.C. (reg); N.C. (sp 2); Hold	D_{34} N.M. Re-elected	D_{33} Mont. Re-elected	D_{32} Miss. Re-elected	D_{31} Minn. Re-elected	D_{30} La. Re-elected	D_{29} Ill. Re-elected
D_{39} S.C. Hold	D_{40} Tenn. Re-elected	D_{41} Texas; Re-elected	D_{42} Va. Re-elected	D_{43} W.Va. Re-elected	D_{44} Ky. Gain	D_{45} Mich. Gain	D_{46} Nev. (sp); Gain (Note: Appointee defeated)	D_{47} Ore. Gain	D_{48} Wyo. (reg); Wyo. (sp); Gain
Majority with Independent in caucus ↑									I_{1}
R_{39} Neb. (sp 2); Hold Neb. (reg); Hold	R_{40} Neb. (sp 1); Hold	R_{41} N.H. (reg); Re-elected	R_{42} N.H. (sp); Hold	R_{43} N.J. Hold	R_{44} S.D. Re-elected	R_{45} Colo. Gain	R_{46} Iowa; Gain	R_{47} Ohio (sp); Gain	I_{1}
R_{38} Mass. Re-elected	R_{37} Me. Re-elected	R_{36} Kan. Re-elected	R_{35} Idaho; Re-elected	R_{34} Calif. (sp); Elected	R_{33}	R_{32}	R_{31}	R_{30}	R_{29}
R_{19}	R_{20}	R_{21}	R_{22}	R_{23}	R_{24}	R_{25}	R_{26}	R_{27}	R_{28}
R_{18}	R_{17}	R_{16}	R_{15}	R_{14}	R_{13}	R_{12}	R_{11}	R_{10}	R_{9}
		R_{1}	R_{2}	R_{3}	R_{4}	R_{5}	R_{6}	R_{7}	R_{8}

Key:

D_{#}	Democratic
I_{#}	Independent
R_{#}	Republican

== Race summaries ==
=== Special elections during the 83rd Congress ===
In these special elections, the winners were seated during 1954 or before January 3, 1955; ordered by election date, then state, then class.

State	Incumbent			Results	Candidates
State	Senator	Party	Electoral history	Results	Candidates
California (Class 3)	Thomas Kuchel	Republican	1953 (Appointed)	Interim appointee elected November 2, 1954.	▌ ✓ Thomas Kuchel (Republican) 53.2%; ▌Sam Yorty (Democratic) 45.5%; ▌Isobel M. Cerney (Progressive) 1.3%
Nebraska (Class 1)	Samuel W. Reynolds	Republican	1954 (Appointed)	Interim appointee retired. New senator elected November 2, 1954. Republican hold.	▌ ✓ Roman Hruska (Republican) 60.9%; ▌James F. Green (Democratic) 39.1%
Nebraska (Class 2)	Eva Bowring	Republican	1954 (Appointed)	Interim appointee retired. New senator elected November 2, 1954. Winner was not elected to the next term; see below. Republican hold.	▌ ✓ Hazel Abel (Republican) 57.8%; ▌William H. Meier (Democratic) 42.2%
Nevada (Class 3)	Ernest S. Brown	Republican	1954 (Appointed)	Interim appointee lost election. New senator elected November 2, 1954. Democratic gain.	▌ ✓ Alan Bible (Democratic) 58.1%; ▌Ernest S. Brown (Republican) 41.9%
New Hampshire (Class 3)	Robert W. Upton	Republican	1953 (Appointed)	Interim appointee lost nomination. New senator elected November 2, 1954. Republican hold.	▌ ✓ Norris Cotton (Republican) 60.2%; ▌Stanley J. Betley (Democratic) 39.8%
North Carolina (Class 2)	Alton Lennon	Democratic	1953 (Appointed)	Interim appointee lost nomination. New senator elected November 2, 1954. Democratic hold. Winner also elected to next term; see below.	▌ ✓ W. Kerr Scott (Democratic); Unopposed
North Carolina (Class 3)	Sam Ervin	Democratic	1954 (Appointed)	Interim appointee elected November 2, 1954.	▌ ✓ Sam Ervin (Democratic); Unopposed
Ohio (Class 3)	Thomas A. Burke	Democratic	1953 (Appointed)	Interim appointee lost election. New senator elected November 2, 1954. Republican gain.	▌ ✓ George H. Bender (Republican) 50.1%; ▌Thomas A. Burke (Democratic) 49.9%
Wyoming (Class 2)	Edward D. Crippa	Republican	1954 (Appointed)	Interim appointee retired. New senator elected November 2, 1954. Winner also elected to the next term; see below. Democratic gain.	▌ ✓ Joseph C. O'Mahoney (Democratic) 51.6%; ▌William Henry Harrison III (Republican) 48.4%

=== Races leading to the 84th Congress ===
In these general elections, the winner was seated on January 3, 1955; ordered by state.

All of the elections involved the Class 2 seats.

State	Incumbent			Results	Candidates
State	Senator	Party	Electoral history	Results	Candidates
Alabama	John Sparkman	Democratic	1946 (special); 1948	Incumbent re-elected.	▌ ✓ John Sparkman (Democratic) 82.5%; ▌Junius Foy Guin Jr. (Republican) 17.5%
Arkansas	John L. McClellan	Democratic	1942; 1948	Incumbent re-elected.	▌ ✓ John L. McClellan (Democratic); Unopposed
Colorado	Edwin C. Johnson	Democratic	1936; 1942; 1948	Incumbent retired to run for Governor. Republican gain.	▌ ✓ Gordon Allott (Republican) 51.3%; ▌John A. Carroll (Democratic) 48.7%
Delaware	J. Allen Frear Jr.	Democratic	1948	Incumbent re-elected.	▌ ✓ J. Allen Frear Jr. (Democratic) 56.9%; ▌Herbert Warburton (Republican) 43.1%
Georgia	Richard Russell Jr.	Democratic	1932 (special); 1936; 1942; 1948	Incumbent re-elected.	▌ ✓ Richard Russell Jr. (Democratic); Unopposed
Idaho	Henry Dworshak	Republican	1946 (special); 1948 (Lost); 1949 (Appointed); 1950 (special)	Incumbent re-elected.	▌ ✓ Henry Dworshak (Republican) 62.8%; ▌Glen H. Taylor (Democratic) 37.2%
Illinois	Paul Douglas	Democratic	1948	Incumbent re-elected.	▌ ✓ Paul Douglas (Democratic) 53.6%; ▌Joseph T. Meek (Republican) 46.4%
Iowa	Guy Gillette	Democratic	1936 (special); 1938; 1944 (Lost); 1948	Incumbent lost re-election. Republican gain.	▌ ✓ Thomas E. Martin (Republican) 52.2%; ▌Guy Gillette (Democratic) 47.5%; ▌Ernest Seemann (Republicsons) 0.3%
Kansas	Andrew Frank Schoeppel	Republican	1948	Incumbent re-elected.	▌ ✓ Andrew Frank Schoeppel (Republican) 56.3%; ▌George McGill (Democratic) 41.8%; ▌David C. White (Prohibition) 1.8%
Kentucky	John Sherman Cooper	Republican	1946 (special); 1948 (Lost); 1952 (special)	Incumbent lost re-election. Democratic gain.	▌ ✓ Alben W. Barkley (Democratic) 54.5%; ▌John Sherman Cooper (Republican) 45.5%
Louisiana	Allen J. Ellender	Democratic	1936; 1942; 1948	Incumbent re-elected.	▌ ✓ Allen J. Ellender (Democratic); Unopposed
Maine	Margaret Chase Smith	Republican	1948	Incumbent re-elected.	▌ ✓ Margaret Chase Smith (Republican) 58.6%; ▌Paul A. Fullam (Democratic) 41.4%
Massachusetts	Leverett Saltonstall	Republican	1944 (special); 1948	Incumbent re-elected.	▌ ✓ Leverett Saltonstall (Republican) 50.5%; ▌Foster Furcolo (Democratic) 49.0%
Michigan	Homer S. Ferguson	Republican	1942; 1948	Incumbent lost re-election. Democratic gain.	▌ ✓ Patrick V. McNamara (Democratic) 50.8%; ▌Homer S. Ferguson (Republican) 48.9%
Minnesota	Hubert Humphrey	DFL	1948	Incumbent re-elected.	▌ ✓ Hubert Humphrey (DFL) 56.4%; ▌Val Bjornson (Republican) 42.1%
Mississippi	James Eastland	Democratic	1942; 1948	Incumbent re-elected.	▌ ✓ James Eastland (Democratic); Unopposed
Montana	James E. Murray	Democratic	1934 (special); 1936; 1942; 1948	Incumbent re-elected.	▌ ✓ James E. Murray (Democratic) 50.4%; ▌Wesley A. D'Ewart (Republican) 49.6%
Nebraska	Eva Bowring	Republican	1954 (appointed)	Interim appointee retired. Republican hold. Winner was not elected to finish the term; see above. Successor seated January 1, 1955.	▌ ✓ Carl Curtis (Republican) 61.1%; ▌Keith Neville (Democratic) 38.9%
New Hampshire	Styles Bridges	Republican	1936; 1942; 1948	Incumbent re-elected.	▌ ✓ Styles Bridges (Republican) 60.2%; ▌Gerard L. Morin (Democratic) 39.8%
New Jersey	Robert C. Hendrickson	Republican	1948	Incumbent retired. Republican hold.	▌ ✓ Clifford P. Case (Republican) 48.7%; ▌Charles R. Howell (Democratic) 48.5%
New Mexico	Clinton Anderson	Democratic	1948	Incumbent re-elected.	▌ ✓ Clinton Anderson (Democratic) 57.3%; ▌Edwin L. Mechem (Republican) 42.7%
North Carolina	Alton Lennon	Democratic	1953 (Appointed)	Interim appointee lost nomination. Democratic hold. Winner also elected to finish the term; see above.	▌ ✓ W. Kerr Scott (Democratic) 65.90%; ▌Paul C. West (Republican) 34.10%
Oklahoma	Robert S. Kerr	Democratic	1948	Incumbent re-elected.	▌ ✓ Robert S. Kerr (Democratic) 55.8%; ▌Fred M. Mock (Republican) 43.7%; Others: ▌George V. Fried (Independent) 0.3%; ▌George H. Brasier (Independent) 0.2%
Oregon	Guy Cordon	Republican	1944 (Appointed); 1944 (special); 1948	Incumbent lost re-election. Democratic gain.	▌ ✓ Richard L. Neuberger (Democratic) 50.2%; ▌Guy Cordon (Republican) 49.8%
Rhode Island	Theodore F. Green	Democratic	1936; 1942; 1948	Incumbent re-elected.	▌ ✓ Theodore F. Green (Democratic) 59.3%; ▌Walter I. Sundlun (Republican) 40.7%
South Carolina	Charles E. Daniel	Democratic	1954 (Appointed)	Interim appointee retired. Democratic hold. Incumbent then resigned December 23, 1954, to give successor preferential seniority. Winner appointed December 24 to finish the term.	▌ ✓ Strom Thurmond (Democratic) 63.1%; ▌Edgar Allan Brown (Democratic) 36.8%
South Dakota	Karl Mundt	Republican	1948; 1948 (Appointed)	Incumbent re-elected.	▌ ✓ Karl Mundt (Republican) 57.3%; ▌Kenneth Holum (Democratic) 42.7%
Tennessee	Estes Kefauver	Democratic	1948	Incumbent re-elected.	▌ ✓ Estes Kefauver (Democratic) 70.0%; ▌Tom Wall (Republican) 30.0%
Texas	Lyndon B. Johnson	Democratic	1948	Incumbent re-elected.	▌ ✓ Lyndon B. Johnson (Democratic) 84.6%; ▌Carlos G. Watson (Republican) 14.9%; ▌Fred Spangler (Constitution) 0.5%
Virginia	A. Willis Robertson	Democratic	1946 (special); 1948	Incumbent re-elected.	▌ ✓ A. Willis Robertson (Democratic) 79.9%; ▌Charles W. Lewis Jr. (Ind. Democratic) 10.7%; ▌Clarke T. Robb (Social Democratic) 9.4%
West Virginia	Matthew M. Neely	Democratic	1922; 1928 (Lost); 1930; 1936; 1941 (Resigned); 1948	Incumbent re-elected.	▌ ✓ Matthew M. Neely (Democratic) 54.8%; ▌Thomas Sweeney (Republican) 45.2%
Wyoming	Edward D. Crippa	Republican	1954 (Appointed)	Interim appointee retired. Democratic gain. Winner also elected to finish the term; see above.	▌ ✓ Joseph C. O'Mahoney (Democratic) 51.5%; ▌William Henry Harrison III (Republican) 48.5%

== Closest races ==
Twelve races had a margin of victory under 10%:

State	Party of winner	Margin
Ohio (special)	Republican (flip)	0.12%
New Jersey	Republican	0.19%
Oregon	Democratic (flip)	0.4% (Note: Oregon was the "tipping-point state".)
Montana	Democratic	0.8%
Massachusetts	Republican	1.5%
Michigan	Democratic (flip)	1.9%
Colorado	Republican (flip)	2.6%
Wyoming	Democratic (flip)	3.2%
Iowa	Republican (flip)	4.7%
California (special)	Republican	7.7%
Kentucky	Democratic (flip)	9.0%
West Virginia	Democratic	9.6%

== Alabama ==
1954 United States Senate election in Alabama
- November 2, 1954
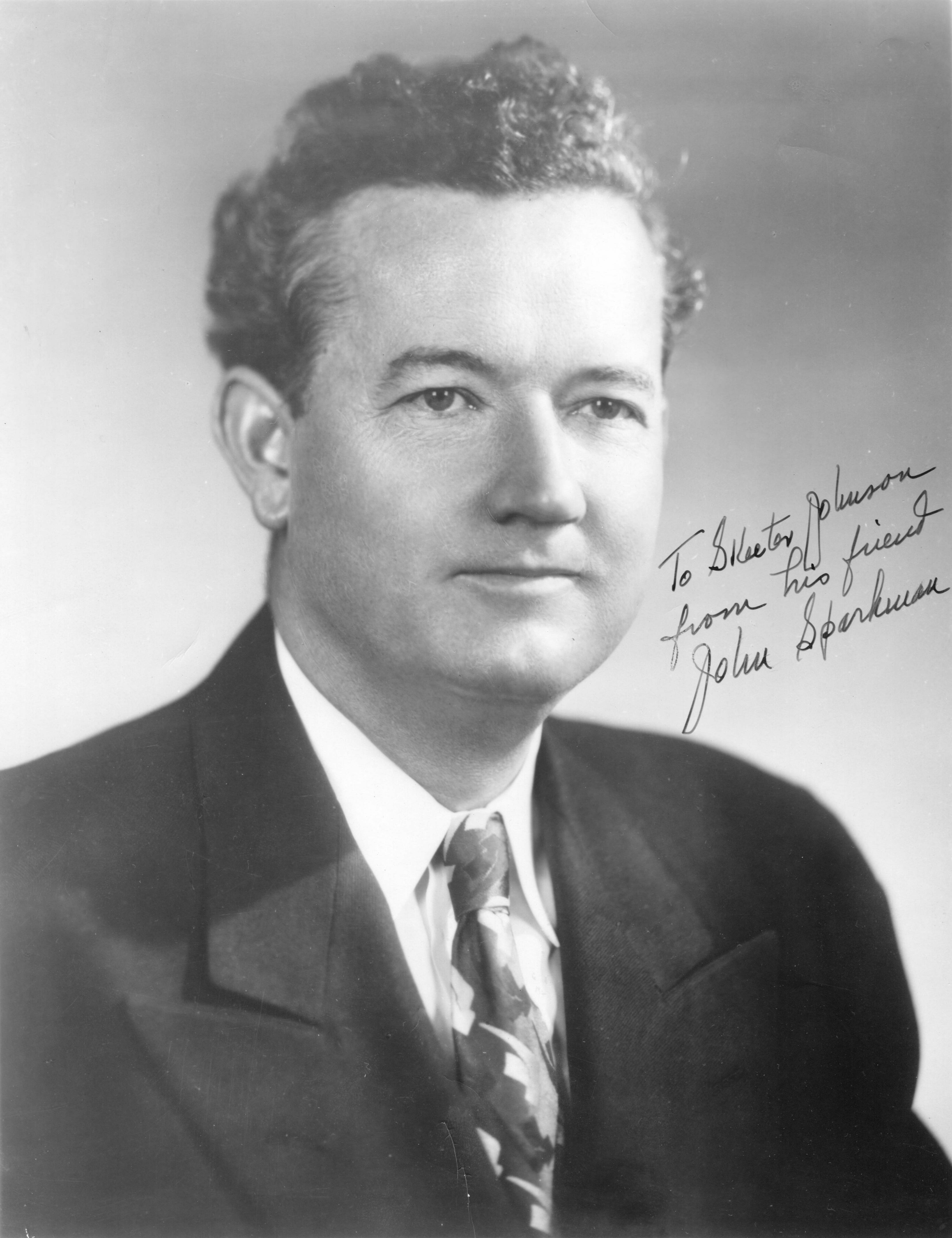

Nominee	John Sparkman	Junius Foy Guin Jr.
Party	Democratic	Republican
Popular vote	259,348	55,110
Percentage	82.48%	17.53%
- County results Sparkman: 50–60% 60–70% 70–80% 80–90% >90%
U.S. senator before election
John Sparkman
Democratic
Elected U.S. Senator
John Sparkman
Democratic

Alabama election
Party	Candidate	Votes	%
Democratic	John Sparkman (Incumbent)	259,348	82.47
Republican	J. Foy Guin Jr.	55,110	17.53
Majority		204,438	64.96
Turnout		314,458	
Democratic hold			

== Arkansas ==
1954 U.S. Senate Democratic primary in Arkansas
- July 27, 1954
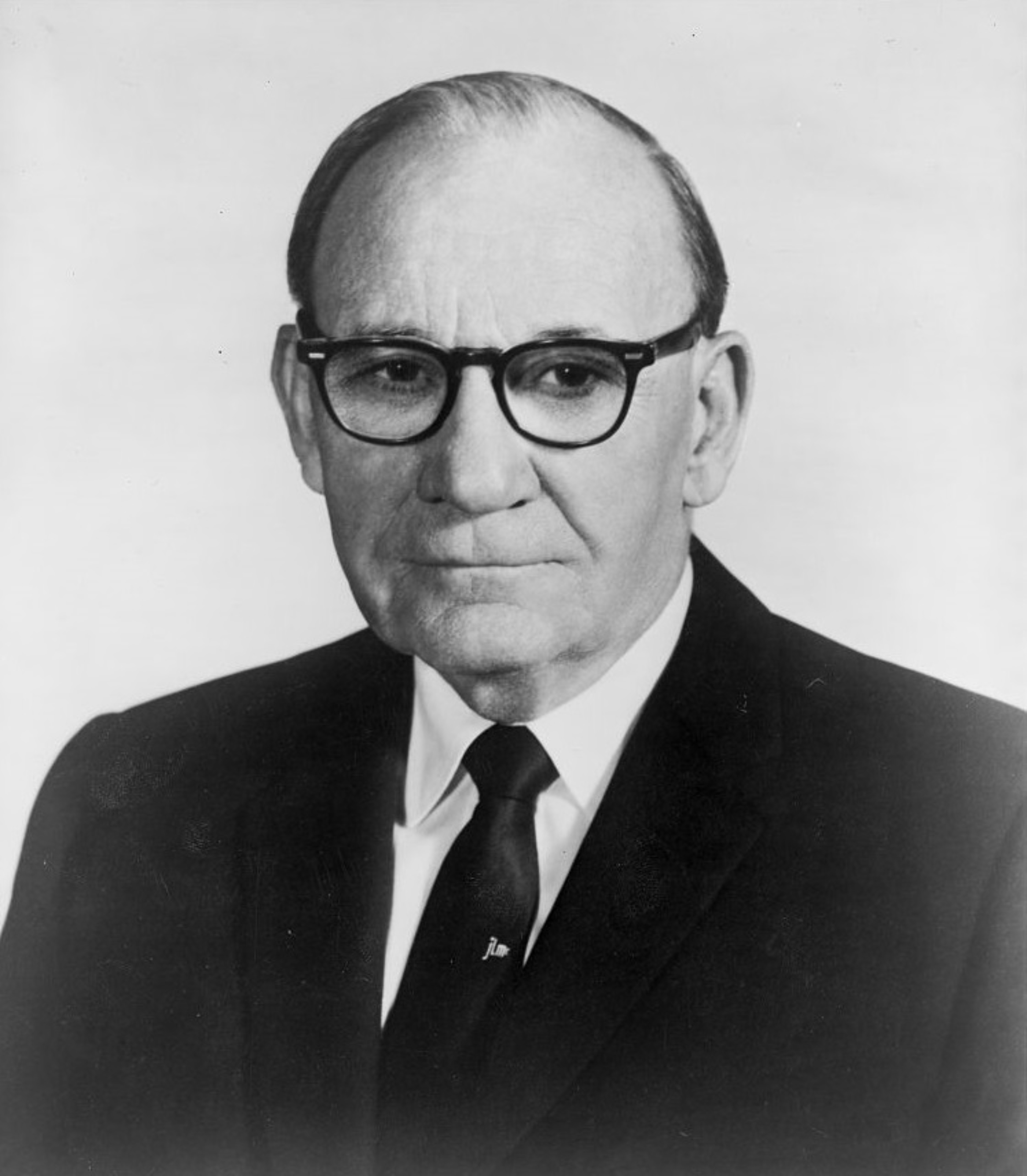

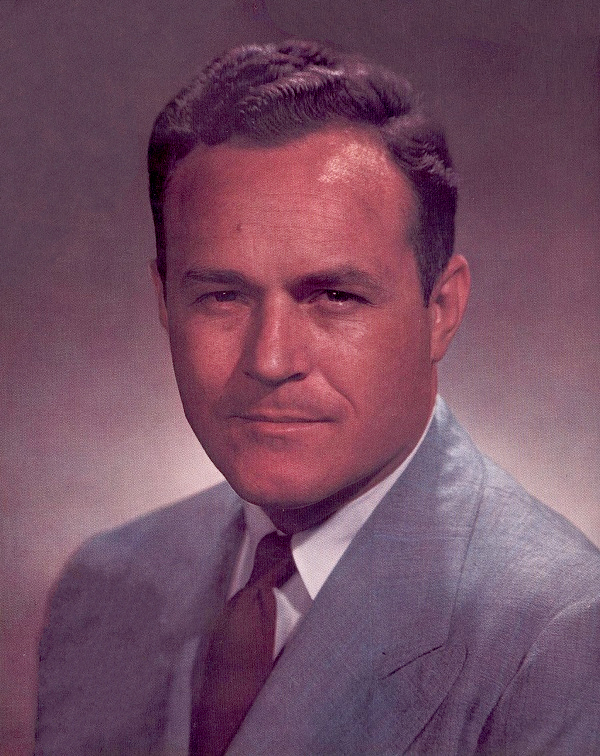
Nominee	John L. McClellan	Sid McMath
Party	Democratic	Democratic
Popular vote	164,905	127,941
Percentage	50.35%	39.06%
- County results McClellan: 40–50% 50–60% 60–70% 70–80% 80–90% McMath: 40–50% 50–60% 60–70% 70–80% 80–90%
U.S. senator before election
John L. McClellan
Democratic
Elected U.S. Senator
John L. McClellan
Democratic

Arkansas election
Party	Candidate	Votes	%
Democratic	John L. McClellan (Incumbent)	291,058	100
Democratic hold			

== California (special) ==
1954 United States Senate special election in California
- November 2, 1954
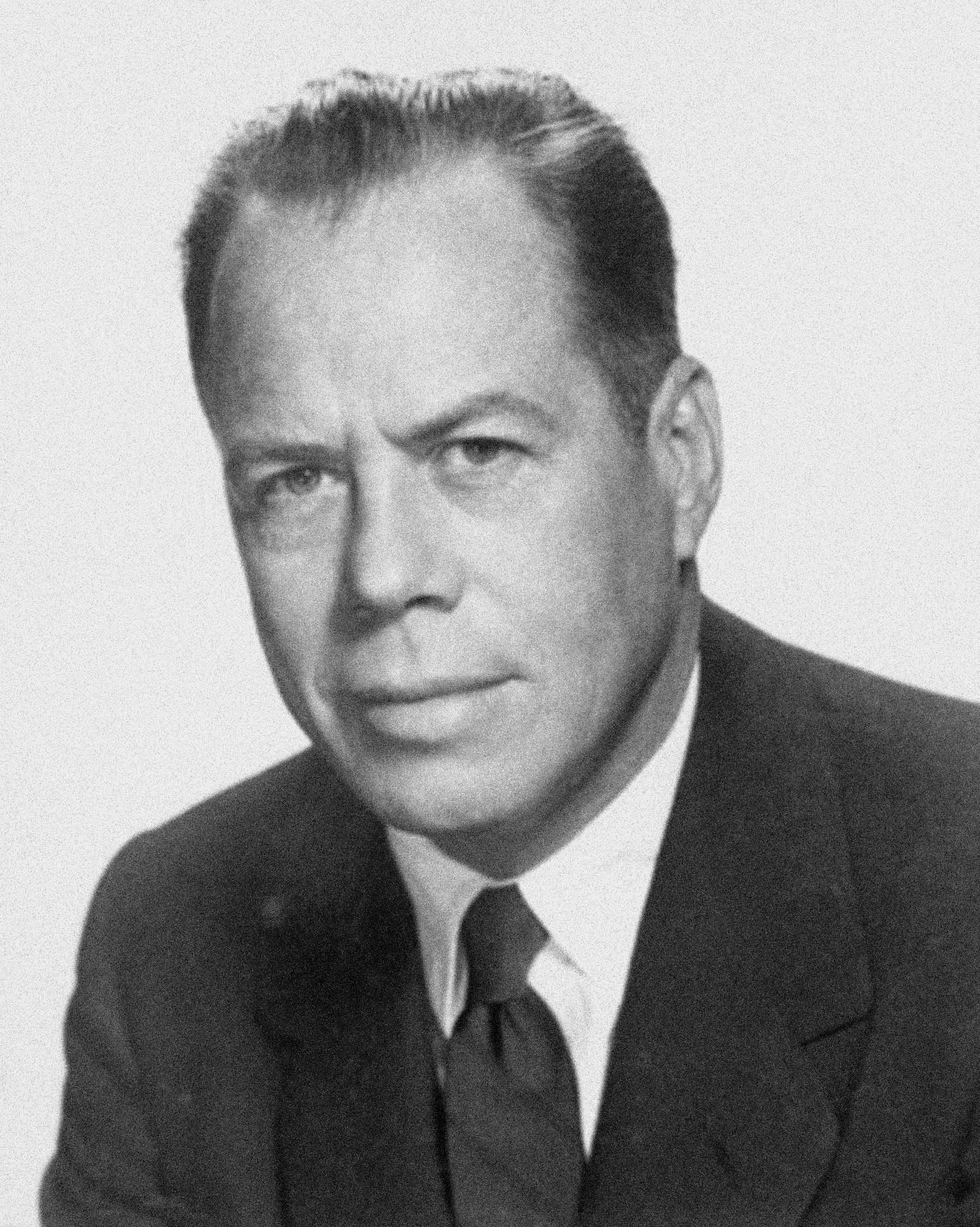

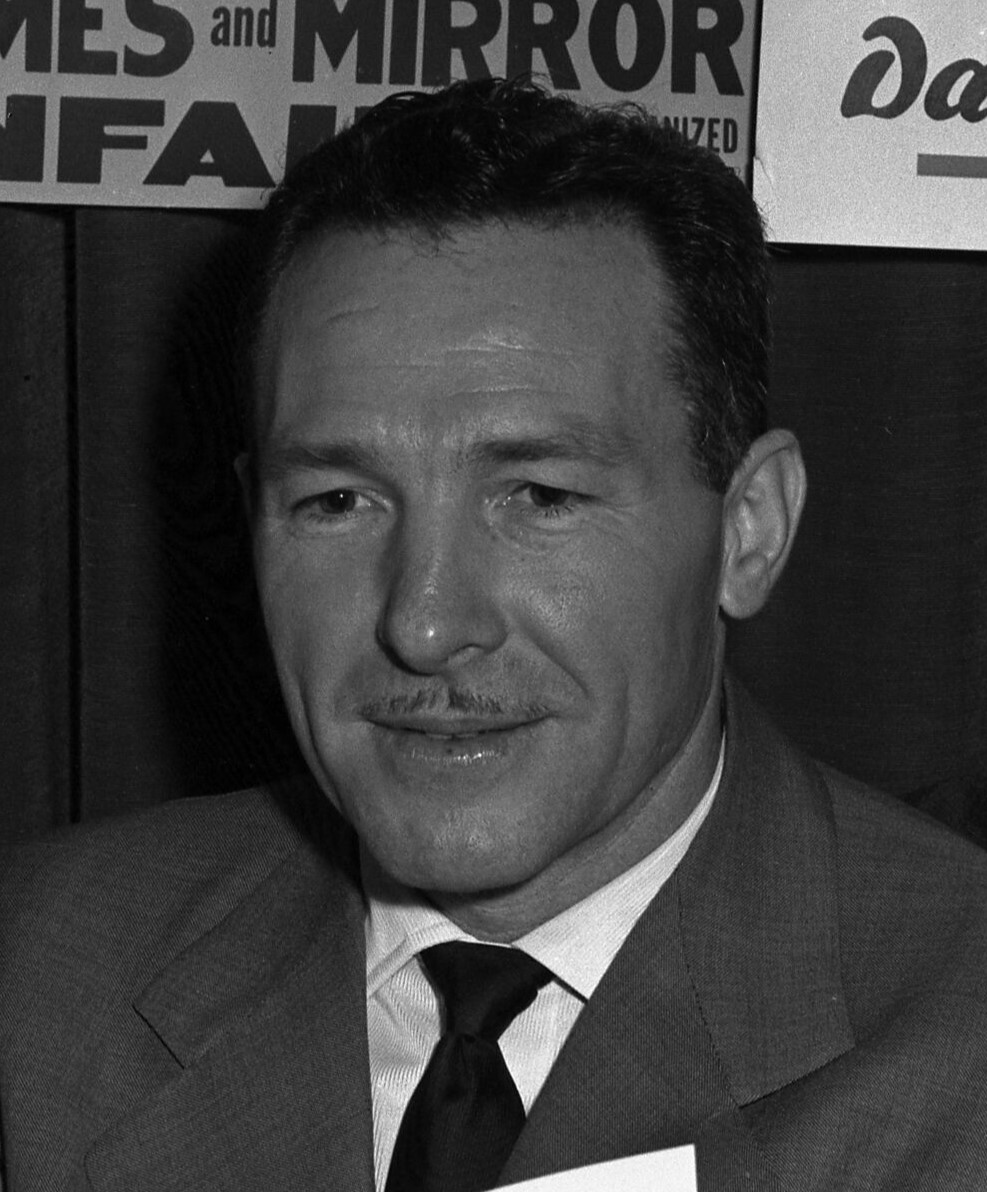
Nominee	Thomas Kuchel	Sam Yorty
Party	Republican	Democratic
Popular vote	2,090,836	1,788,071
Percentage	53.21%	45.50%
- County results: Thomas Kuchel: 50–60% 60–70% 70–80% Sam Yorty: 50–60%
U.S. senator before election
Thomas Kuchel
Republican
Elected U.S. Senator
Thomas Kuchel
Republican

Following the resignation of Richard Nixon to assume the vice presidency, Governor Earl Warren appointed Thomas Kuchel to Nixon's seat; Kuchel assumed the office on January 2, 1953.

California election
Party	Candidate	Votes	%
Republican	Thomas Kuchel (Incumbent)	2,090,836	53.2
Democratic	Sam Yorty	1,788,071	45.5
Independent–Progressive	Isobel M. Cerney	50,506	1.3
None	Scattering	255	nil
Majority		302,765	7.7
Turnout		3,929,668	
Republican hold			

== Colorado ==
1954 United States Senate election in Colorado
- November 2, 1954
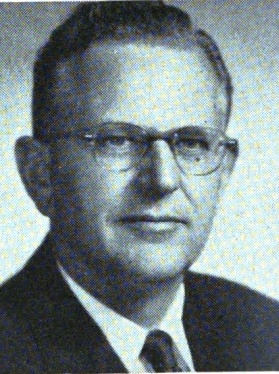

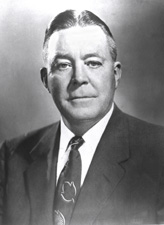
Nominee	Gordon Allott	John A. Carroll
Party	Republican	Democratic
Popular vote	248,502	235,686
Percentage	51.32%	48.68%
- County results Allott: 50–60% 60–70% Carroll: 50–60% 60–70%
U.S. senator before election
Edwin C. Johnson
Democratic
Elected U.S. Senator
Gordon Allott
Republican

Colorado election
Party	Candidate	Votes	%
Republican	Gordon Allott	248,502	51.32
Democratic	John A. Carroll	235,686	48.68
Majority		12,816	2.64
Turnout		484,188	
Republican gain from Democratic			

== Delaware ==
1954 United States Senate election in Delaware
- November 2, 1954
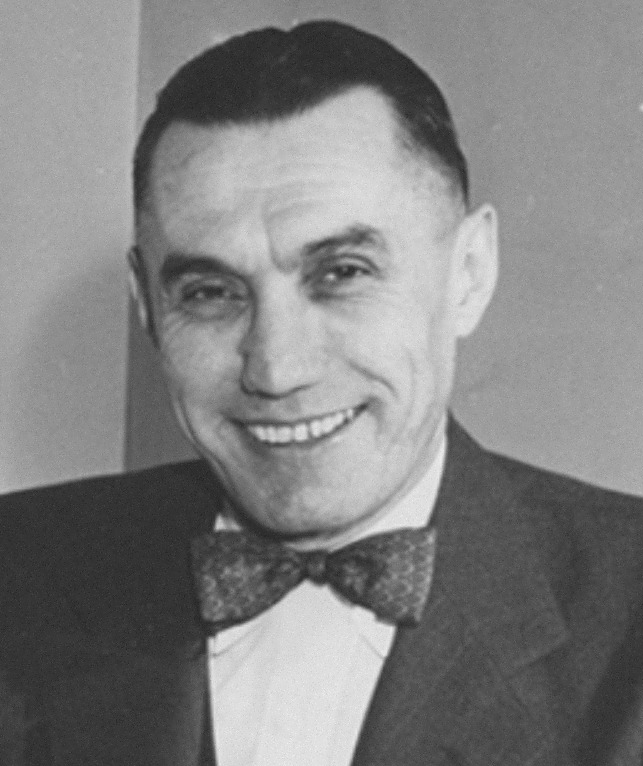

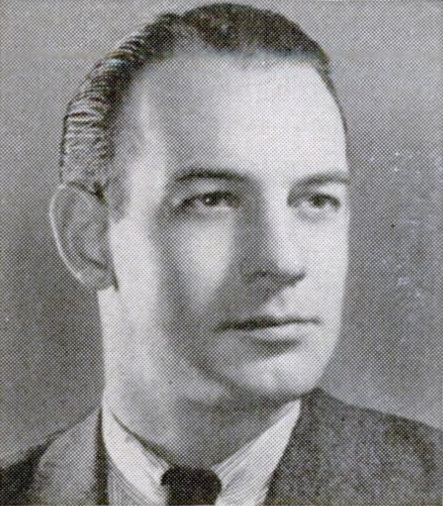
Nominee	J. Allen Frear Jr.	Herbert B. Warburton
Party	Democratic	Republican
Popular vote	82,511	62,389
Percentage	56.94%	43.06%
- County results Frear: 50–60% 60–70%
U.S. senator before election
J. Allen Frear Jr.
Democratic
Elected U.S. Senator
J. Allen Frear Jr.
Democratic

Delaware election
Party	Candidate	Votes	%
Democratic	J. Allen Frear (Incumbent)	82,511	56.94
Republican	Herbert B. Warburton	62,389	43.06
Majority		20,122	13.88
Turnout		144,900	
Democratic hold			

== Georgia ==
1954 U.S. Senate Democratic primary in Georgia
- September 8, 1954
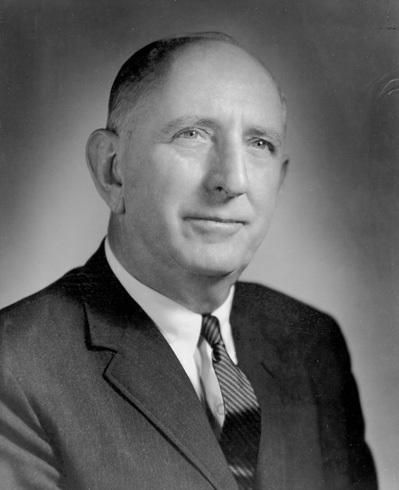
Nominee	Richard Russell Jr.
Party	Democratic
Electoral vote	410
Popular vote	619,129
Percentage	100%
- County results Russell: >90%
U.S. senator before election
Richard Russell Jr.
Democratic
Elected U.S. Senator
Richard Russell Jr.
Democratic

Georgia election
Party	Candidate	Votes	%
Democratic	Richard B. Russell (Incumbent)	333,917	99.99
None	Scattering	19	0.01
Majority		333,898	99.98
Turnout		333,936	
Democratic hold			

== Idaho ==
Idaho election
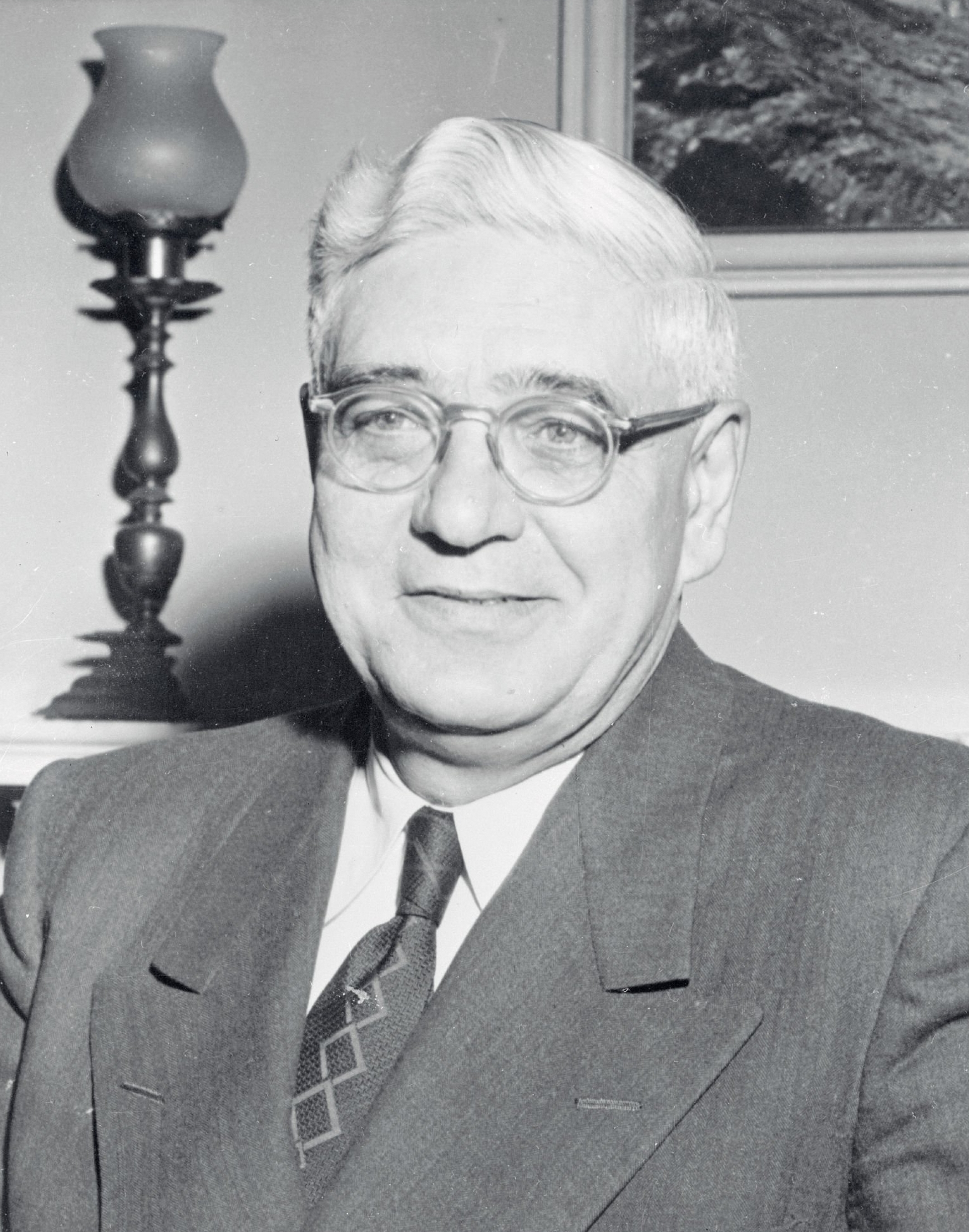

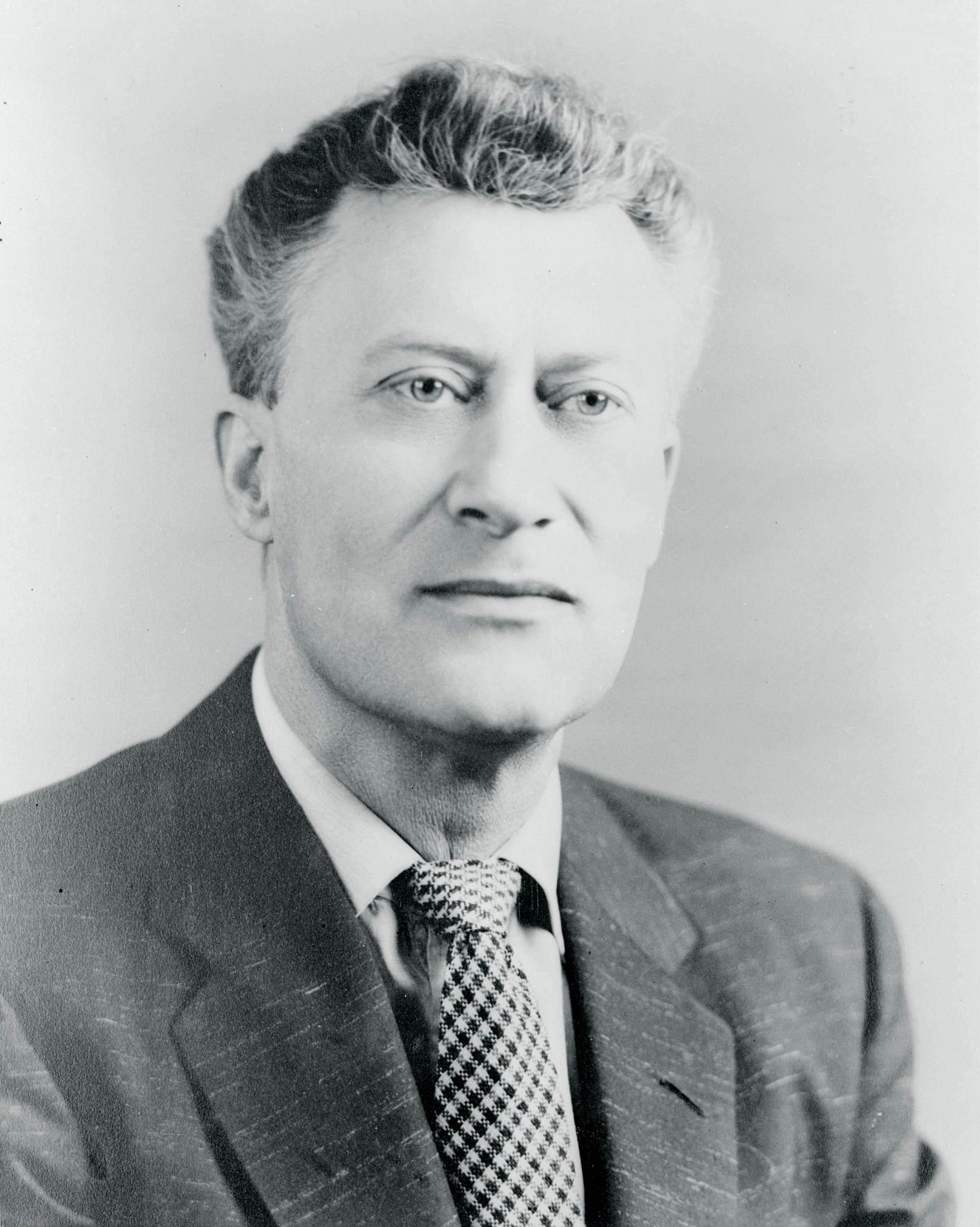
Nominee	Henry Dworshak	Glen H. Taylor
Party	Republican	Democratic
Popular vote	142,269	84,139
Percentage	62.84%	37.16%
- County results Dworshak: 50–60% 60–70% 70–80% Taylor: 50–60% 60–70%
U.S. senator before election
Henry Dworshak
Republican
Elected U.S. Senator
Henry Dworshak
Republican

In Idaho, Republican Incumbent Henry Dworshak defeated Glen H. Taylor, who had previously represented Idaho in the Senate from 1945 to 1951. Allegations of Communist ties were used against Taylor by Dworshak and other Republicans to win the election.

Idaho election
Party	Candidate	Votes	%
Republican	Henry Dworshak (Incumbent)	142,269	62.84%
Democratic	Glen H. Taylor	84,139	37.16%
Majority		58,130	25.68%
Turnout		226,408	
Republican hold			

== Illinois ==
1954 United States Senate election in Illinois
- November 2, 1954
- Turnout: 63.69%
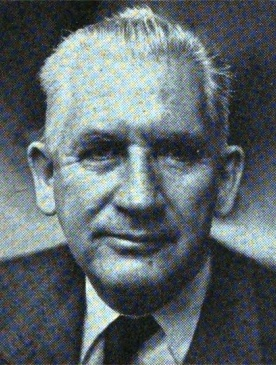

Nominee	Paul Douglas	Joseph T. Meek
Party	Democratic	Republican
Popular vote	1,804,338	1,563,683
Percentage	53.57%	46.43%
- County results Douglas: 50–60% 60–70% Meeks: 50–60% 60–70% 70–80%
U.S. senator before election
Paul Douglas
Democratic
Elected U.S. Senator
Paul Douglas
Democratic

Illinois election
Party	Candidate	Votes	%
Democratic	Paul H. Douglas (Incumbent)	1,804,338	53.57
Republican	Joseph T. Meek	1,563,683	46.43
Majority		240,655	7.14
Turnout		3,368,021	
Democratic hold			

== Iowa ==
1954 United States Senate election in Iowa
- November 2, 1954
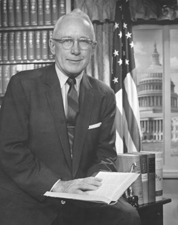

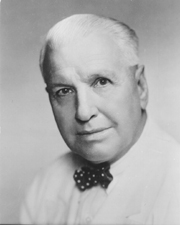
Nominee	Thomas E. Martin	Guy Gillette
Party	Republican	Democratic
Popular vote	442,409	402,712
Percentage	52.21%	47.53%
- County results Martin: 50–60% 60–70% 70–80% Gillette: 50–60% 60–70% Tie: 40–50%
U.S. senator before election
Guy Gillette
Democratic
Elected U.S. Senator
Thomas E. Martin
Republican

Iowa election
Party	Candidate	Votes	%
Republican	Thomas E. Martin	442,409	52.21
Democratic	Guy Gillette (Incumbent)	402,712	47.53
Republicsons	Ernest Seeman	2,234	0.26
Majority		39,697	4.68
Turnout		847,355	
Republican gain from Democratic			

== Kansas ==
1954 United States Senate election in Kansas
- November 2, 1954
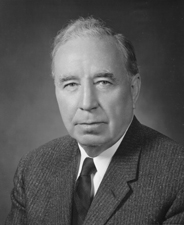

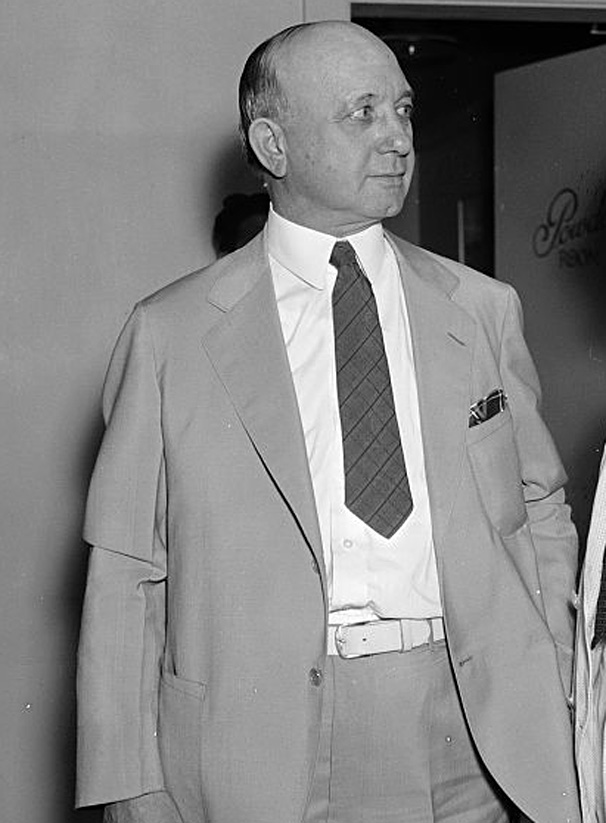
Nominee	Andrew F. Schoeppel	George McGill
Party	Republican	Democratic
Popular vote	348,144	258,575
Percentage	56.33%	41.84%
- County results Schoeppel: 40–50% 50–60% 60–70% 70–80% McGill: 50–60%
U.S. senator before election
Andrew F. Schoeppel
Republican
Elected U.S. Senator
Andrew F. Schoeppel
Republican

General election
Party	Candidate	Votes	%
Republican	Andrew Schoeppel (Incumbent)	348,144	56.33
Democratic	George McGill	258,575	41.84
Prohibition	David C. White	11,344	1.84
Majority		89,569	14.49
Turnout		618,063	
Republican hold			

== Kentucky ==
1954 United States Senate election in Kentucky
- November 2, 1954
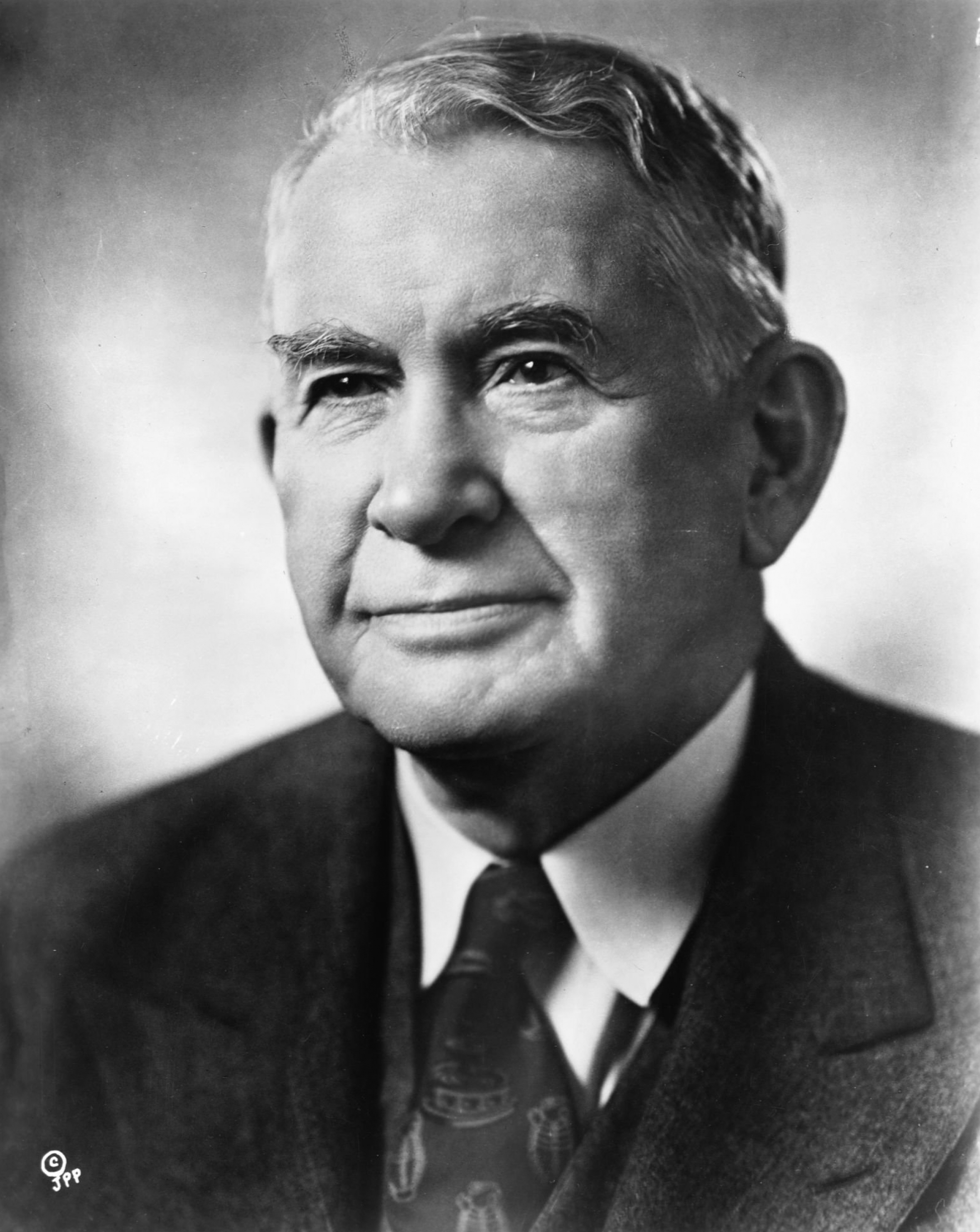

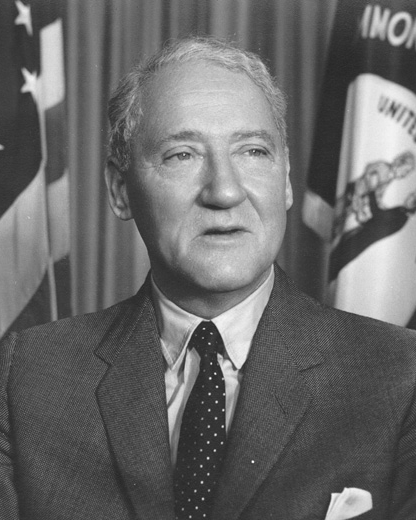
Nominee	Alben Barkley	John Sherman Cooper
Party	Democratic	Republican
Popular vote	434,109	362,948
Percentage	54.46%	45.54%
- County results Barkley: 50–60% 60–70% 70–80% 80–90% Cooper: 50–60% 60–70% 70–80% 80–90%
U.S. senator before election
John Sherman Cooper
Republican
Elected U.S. Senator
Alben Barkley
Democratic

Kentucky election
Party	Candidate	Votes	%
Democratic	Alben Barkley	434,109	54.46
Republican	John Sherman Cooper (Incumbent)	362,948	45.54
Majority		71,161	8.92
Turnout		797,057	
Democratic gain from Republican			

== Louisiana ==
1954 Democratic Senate primary election in Louisiana
- July 27, 1954
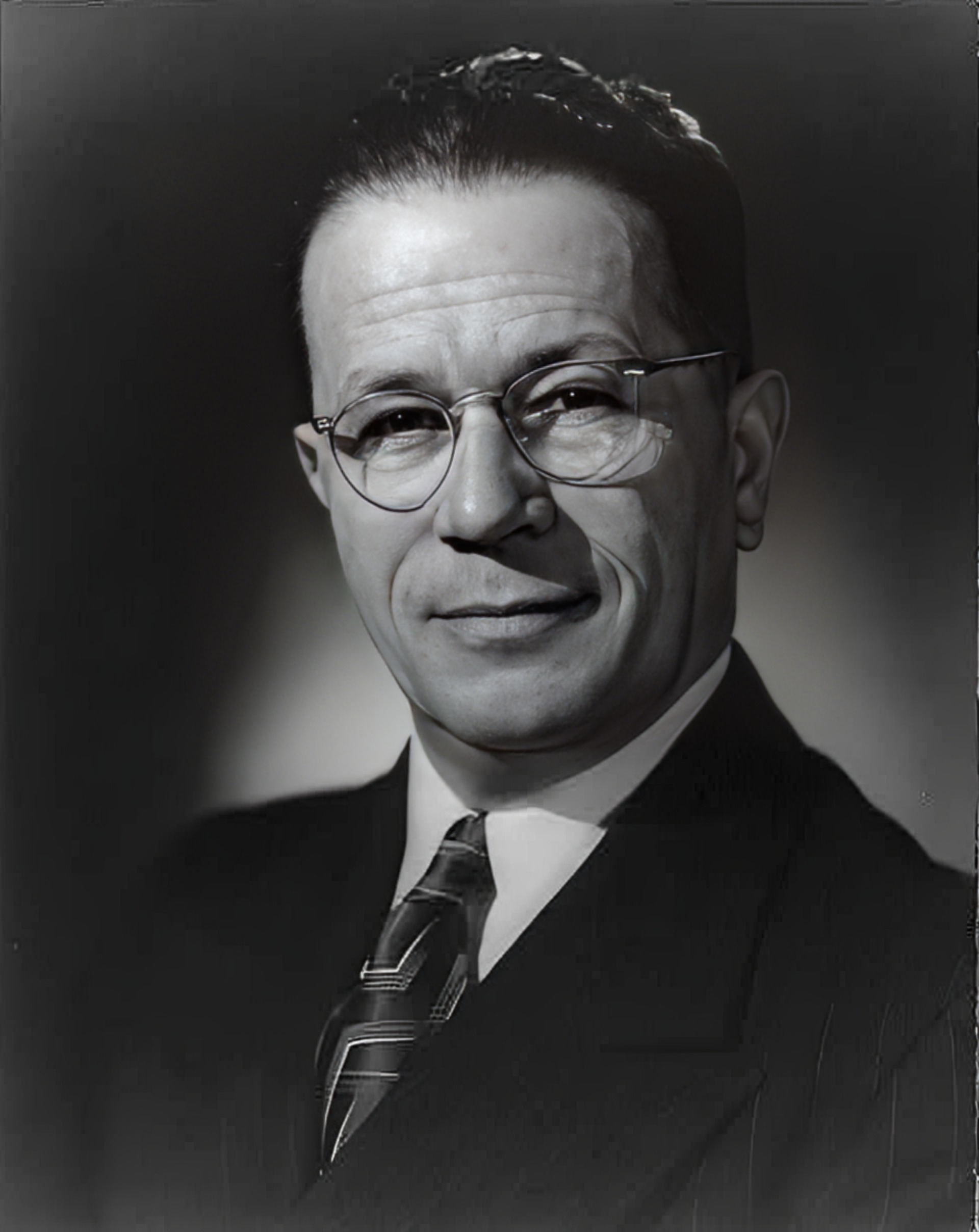

Nominee	Allen Ellender	Frank B. Ellis
Party	Democratic	Democratic
Popular vote	268,054	162,775
Percentage	59.15%	35.92%
- Parish results Ellender: 30–40% 50–60% 60–70% 70–80% 80–90% >90% Ellis: 50–60%
U.S. senator before election
Allen Ellender
Democratic
Elected U.S. Senator
Allen Ellender
Democratic

Louisiana election
Party	Candidate	Votes	%
Democratic	Allen J. Ellender (Incumbent)	207,115	100
Democratic hold			

== Maine ==
1954 United States Senate election in Maine
- September 13, 1954
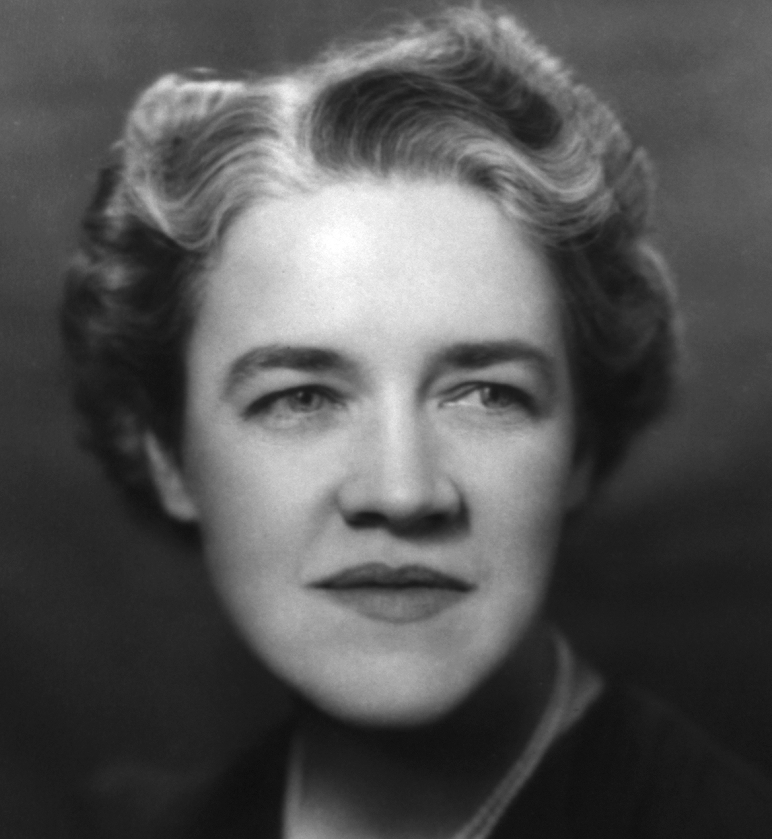

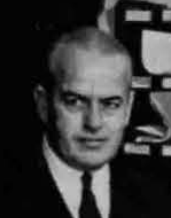
Nominee	Margaret Chase Smith	Paul Fullam
Party	Republican	Democratic
Popular vote	144,530	102,075
Percentage	58.61%	41.39%
- County results Smith: 50–60% 60–70% 70–80% Fullam: 50–60%
U.S. senator before election
Margaret Chase Smith
Republican
Elected U.S. Senator
Margaret Chase Smith
Republican

Maine election
Party	Candidate	Votes	%
Republican	Margaret Chase Smith (Incumbent)	144,530	58.61
Democratic	Paul A. Fullam	102,075	41.39
Majority		42,455	17.22
Turnout		246,605	
Republican hold			

== Massachusetts ==
1954 United States Senate election in Massachusetts
- November 2, 1954
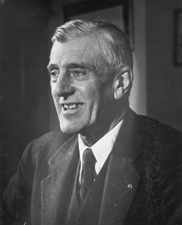

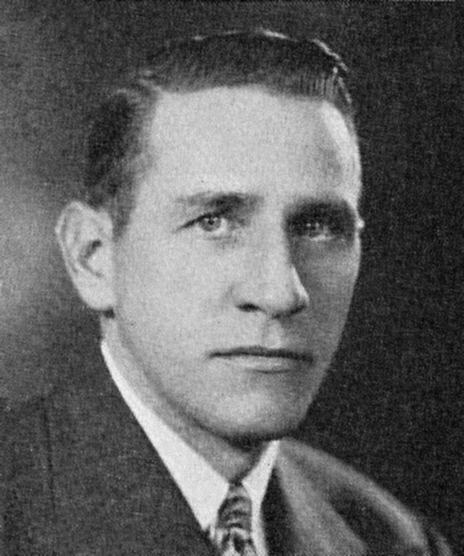
Nominee	Leverett Saltonstall	Foster Furcolo
Party	Republican	Democratic
Popular vote	956,605	927,899
Percentage	50.54%	49.03%

Saltonstall
50–60%
60–70%
70–80%
80–90%
90–100%
Furcolo
50–60%
60–70%
70–80%
Senator before election
Leverett Saltonstall
Republican
Elected Senator
Leverett Saltonstall
Republican

In Massachusetts, Republican Incumbent Leverett Saltonstall defeated his challengers.

Democrat Foster Furcolo (Treasurer and Receiver-General of Massachusetts since 1952 and member of the United States House of Representatives from Massachusetts's 2nd congressional district from 1949 to 1952) beat John I. Fitzgerald (former member of the Boston City Council and Democratic candidate for Senate in 1948) and Joseph L. Murphy (former member of the Massachusetts Senate).

Republican incumbent Leverett Saltonstall (United States senator since 1945 and Governor of Massachusetts from 1939 to 1945) was renominated. Other nominees included Socialist Workers Thelma Ingersoll (ran for Senate in 1952.) and Prohibition Harold J. Ireland (candidate for Treasurer and Receiver-General in 1948 and 1952).

Democratic primary
Party	Candidate	Votes	%
Democratic	Foster Furcolo	207,232	59.13
Democratic	Joseph L. Murphy	79,463	22.68
Democratic	John I. Fitzgerald	63,752	18.19

General election
Party	Candidate	Votes	%	±%
Republican	Leverett Saltonstall (Incumbent)	956,605	50.54	−2.41%
Democratic	Foster Furcolo	927,899	49.03	+2.60%
Socialist Labor	Thelma Ingersoll	5,353	0.28	−0.17%
Prohibition	Harold J. Ireland	2,832	0.15	−0.03%
None	Scattering	21	nil	
Majority		28,706	1.52	
Turnout		1,892,710		
Republican hold		Swing		

== Michigan ==
1954 United States Senate election in Michigan
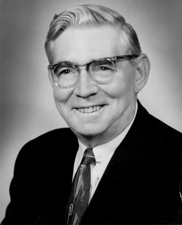

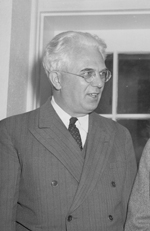
Nominee	Patrick V. McNamara	Homer S. Ferguson
Party	Democratic	Republican
Popular vote	1,088,550	1,049,420
Percentage	50.75%	48.93%
- County results McNamara: 50–60% 60–70% Ferguson: 50–60% 60–70% 70–80%
U.S. senator before election
Homer S. Ferguson
Republican
Elected U.S. Senator
Patrick V. McNamara
Democratic

Michigan election
Party	Candidate	Votes	%
Democratic	Patrick V. McNamara	1,088,550	50.75
Republican	Homer S. Ferguson (Incumbent)	1,049,420	48.93
Prohibition	Leroy M. Lowell	4,841	0.23
Socialist Labor	James Sim	1,126	0.05
Socialist Workers	Rita Shaw	902	0.04
None	Scattering	1	nil
Majority		39,130	1.82
Turnout		2,144,840	
Democratic gain from Republican			

== Minnesota ==
1954 United States Senate election in Minnesota
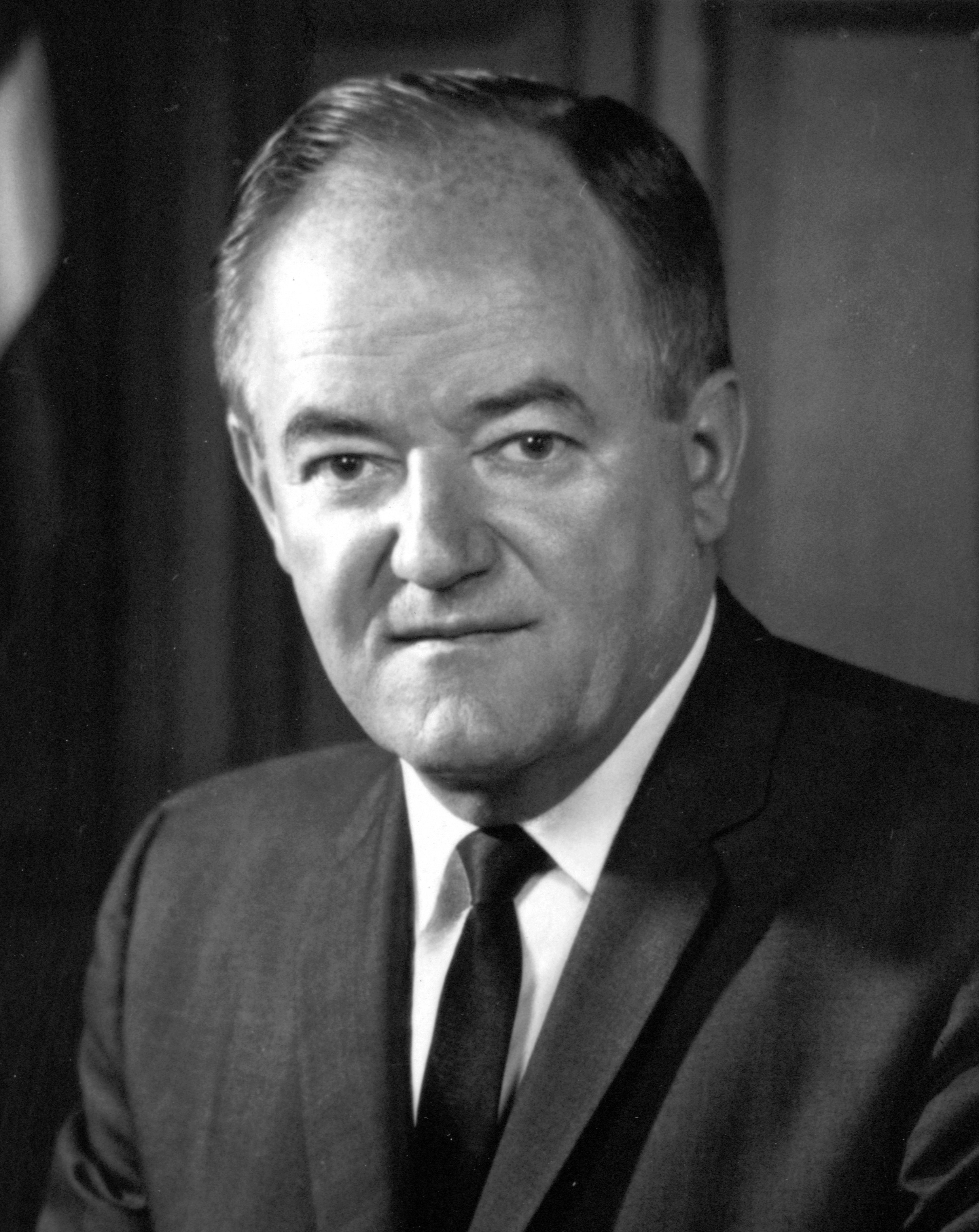

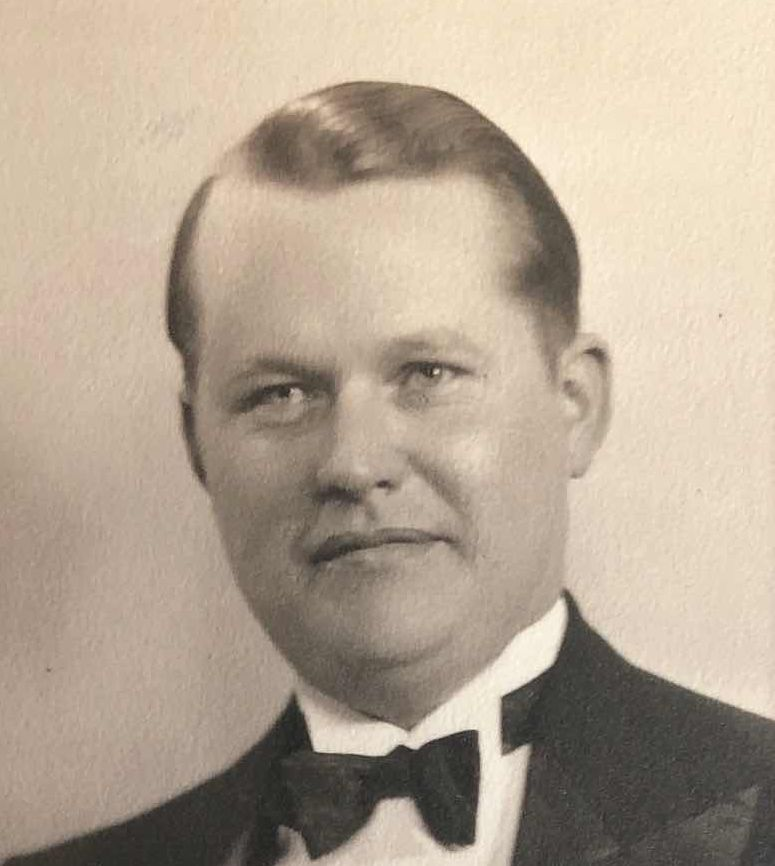
Nominee	Hubert H. Humphrey	Val Bjornson
Party	Democratic (DFL)	Republican
Popular vote	642,193	479,619
Percentage	56.39%	42.11%
- County results Humphrey: 50–60% 60–70% 70–80% Bjornson: 40–50% 50–60% 60–70%
U.S. senator before election
Hubert H. Humphrey
Democratic (DFL)
Elected U.S. Senator
Hubert H. Humphrey
Democratic (DFL)

Minnesota election
Party	Candidate	Votes	%
Democratic (DFL)	Hubert Humphrey (Incumbent)	642,193	56.38
Republican	Val Bjornson	479,619	42.11
Liberal Independent	Francis Patrick Ryan	12,457	1.09
Socialist Workers	Vincent R. Dunne	4,683	0.41
Majority		162,574	14.27
Turnout		1,138,952	
Democratic (DFL) hold			

== Mississippi ==
Mississippi election
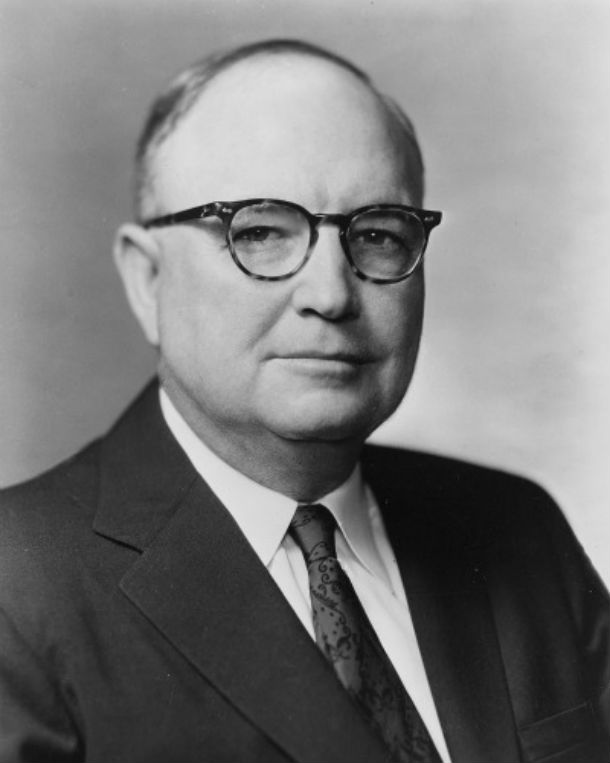

Nominee	James Eastland	James A. White
Party	Democratic	Republican
Popular vote	100,848	4,678
Percentage	95.6%	4.43%
- County results Eastland: 80–90% 90–100%
U.S. senator before election
James Eastland
Democratic
Elected U.S. senator
James Eastland
Democratic

Mississippi election
Party	Candidate	Votes	%
Democratic	James Eastland (Incumbent)	100,848	95.57
Republican	James A. White	4,678	4.43
Majority		96,070	91.14
Turnout		105,526	
Democratic hold			

== Montana ==
1954 United States Senate election in Montana
- November 2, 1954
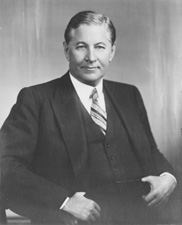

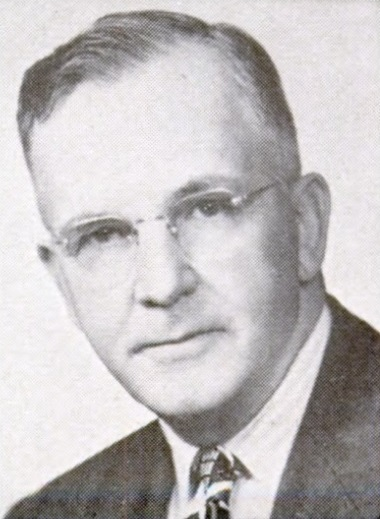
Nominee	James E. Murray	Wesley A. D'Ewart
Party	Democratic	Republican
Popular vote	114,591	112,863
Percentage	50.38%	49.62%
- County results Murray: 50–60% 60–70% D'Ewart: 50–60% 60–70% 70–80%
U.S. senator before election
James E. Murray
Democratic
Elected U.S. Senator
James E. Murray
Democratic

In Montana incumbent senator James E. Murray, who was first elected to the Senate in a special election in 1934 and was re-elected in 1936, 1942, and 1948, ran for re-election.

Murray won the Democratic primary against trivial opponents (farmer Ray E. Gulick and Sam G. Feezell).

Democratic Party primary results
Party	Candidate	Votes	%
Democratic	James E. Murray (Incumbent)	65,896	86.94
Democratic	Ray E. Gulick	4,961	6.55
Democratic	Sam G. Feezell	4,941	6.52
Total votes		75,798	100

Republican Wesley A. D'Ewart United States Congressman from Montana's 2nd congressional district beat Robert Yellowtail, former Superintendent of the Crow Indian Reservation, for the GOP nomination.

Republican Primary results
Party	Candidate	Votes	%
Republican	Wesley A. D'Ewart	49,964	82.36
Republican	Robert Yellowtail	10,705	17.64
Total votes		60,669	100

A contentious and close election ensued, but ultimately, Murray was able to narrowly win re-election over D'Ewart to a final term in the Senate.

Montana election
Party	Candidate	Votes	%	±%
Democratic	James E. Murray (Incumbent)	114,591	50.38	−6.27%
Republican	Wesley A. D'Ewart	112,863	49.62	+6.88%
Majority		1,728	0.76	−13.15%
Turnout		227,454		
Democratic hold		Swing		

== Nebraska ==
Nebraska had three Senate elections on the ballot. Both incumbents had died in the span of three months, leading to appointments and special elections.

=== Nebraska (special, class 1) ===
1954 United States Senate Class I special election in Nebraska
- November 2, 1954
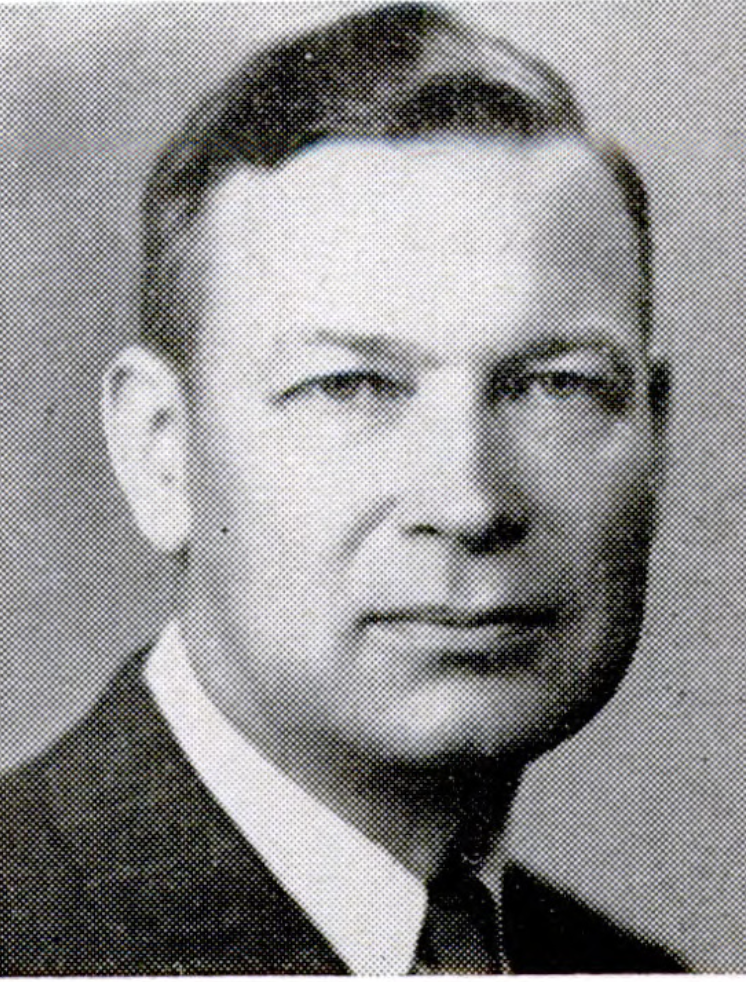

Nominee	Roman Hruska	James F. Green
Party	Republican	Democratic
Popular vote	250,341	160,881
Percentage	60.88%	39.12%
- County results Hruska: 50–60% 60–70% 70–80% Green: 50–60%
U.S. senator before election
Samuel W. Reynolds
Republican
Elected U.S. Senator
Roman Hruska
Republican

Incumbent Republican Hugh A. Butler died July 1, 1954, and governor Robert B. Crosby appointed Republican Samuel W. Reynolds on July 3 to continue the term. Reynolds did not run to finish the term, and Republican Roman Hruska won the seat in November to finish the term ending in 1959.

1954 United States Senate Class I special election in Nebraska
Party	Candidate	Votes	%	±%
Republican	Roman Hruska	250,341	60.88%	−2.69%
Democratic	James F. Green	160,881	39.12%	+2.70%
Write-in		3	0.00%	—
Majority		89,460	21.76%	−5.39%
Total votes		411,225	100.00%	
Republican hold				

=== Nebraska (special, class 2) ===
1954 United States Senate Class II special election in Nebraska
- November 2, 1954
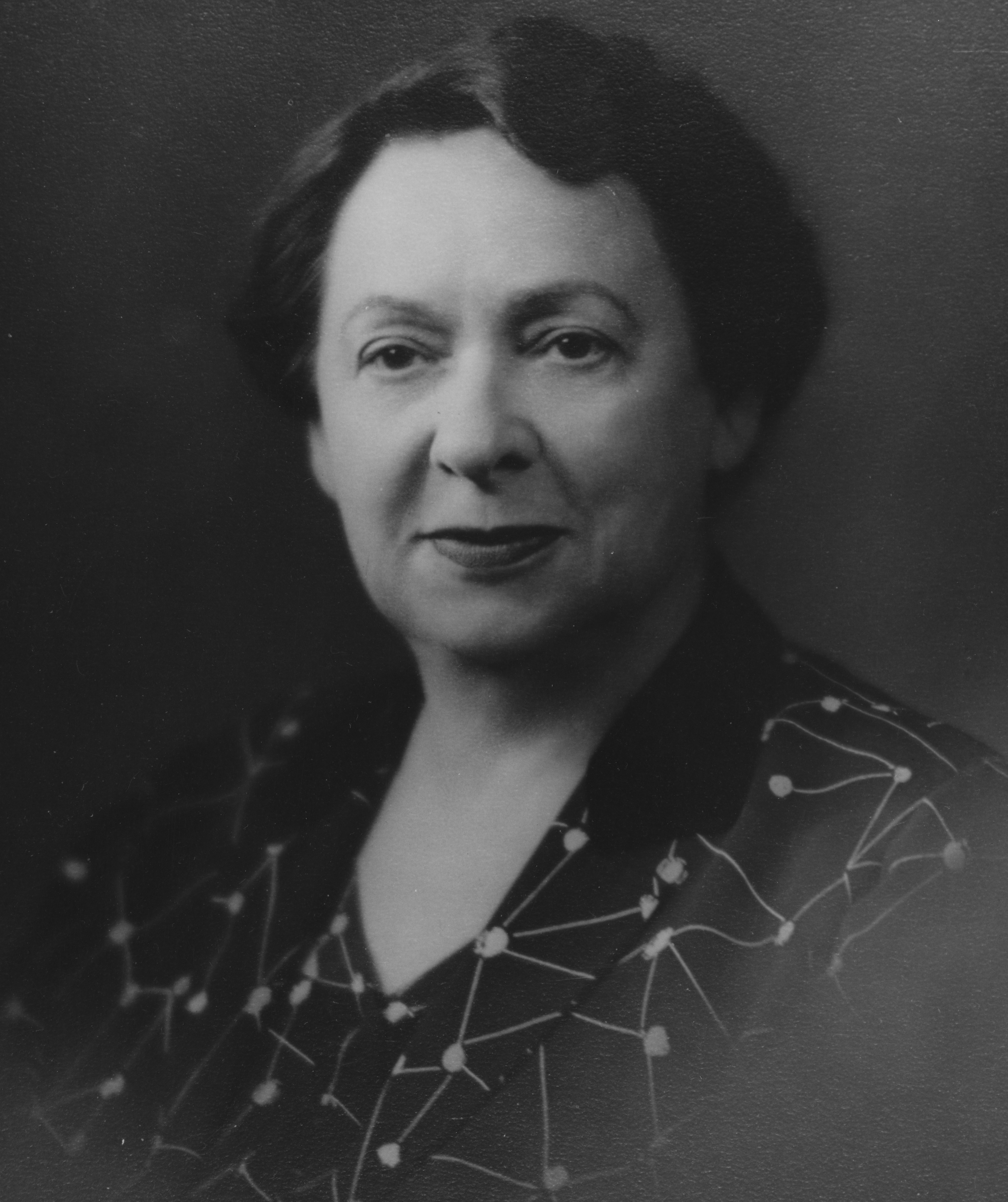

Nominee	Hazel Abel	William H. Meier
Party	Republican	Democratic
Popular vote	233,589	170,828
Percentage	57.76%	42.24%
- County results Abel: 50–60% 60–70% 70–80% Meier: 50–60% 60–70%
U.S. senator before election
Eva Bowring
Republican
Elected U.S. Senator
Hazel Abel
Republican

Second-term Republican Kenneth S. Wherry was re-elected in 1948, but died on November 29, 1951. Governor Val Peterson appointed Fred A. Seaton to fill the seat temporarily. After Seaton chose not to run to continue the term, former governor Dwight P. Griswold elected to fill the remaining two years of the term, but died April 12, 1954, and Republican Eva Bowring was appointed April 16 by governor Crosby to continue Wherry's term. In November, Republican Hazel Abel was elected to finish the term.

1954 United States Senate special election in Nebraska
Party	Candidate	Votes	%	±%
Republican	Hazel Abel	233,589	57.76%	−5.81%
Democratic	William H. Meier	170,828	42.24%	+5.82%
Write-in		5	0.00%	—
Majority		62,761	15.52%	−11.63%
Total votes		404,422	100.00%	
Republican hold				

=== Nebraska (regular) ===
1954 United States Senate election in Nebraska
- November 2, 1954
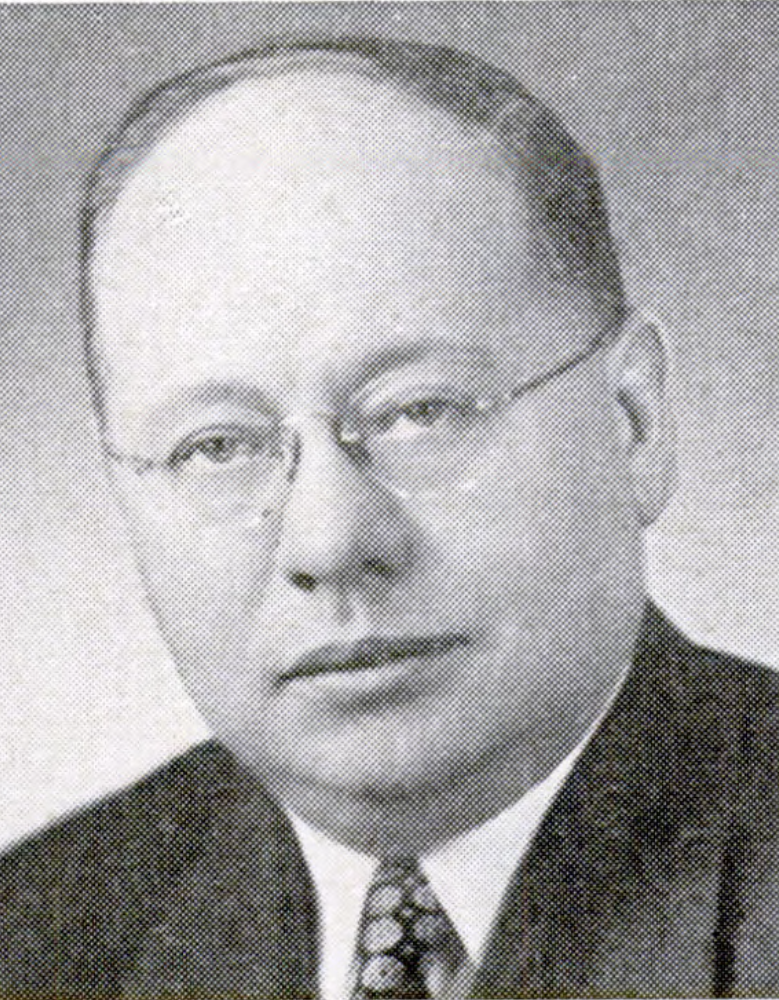

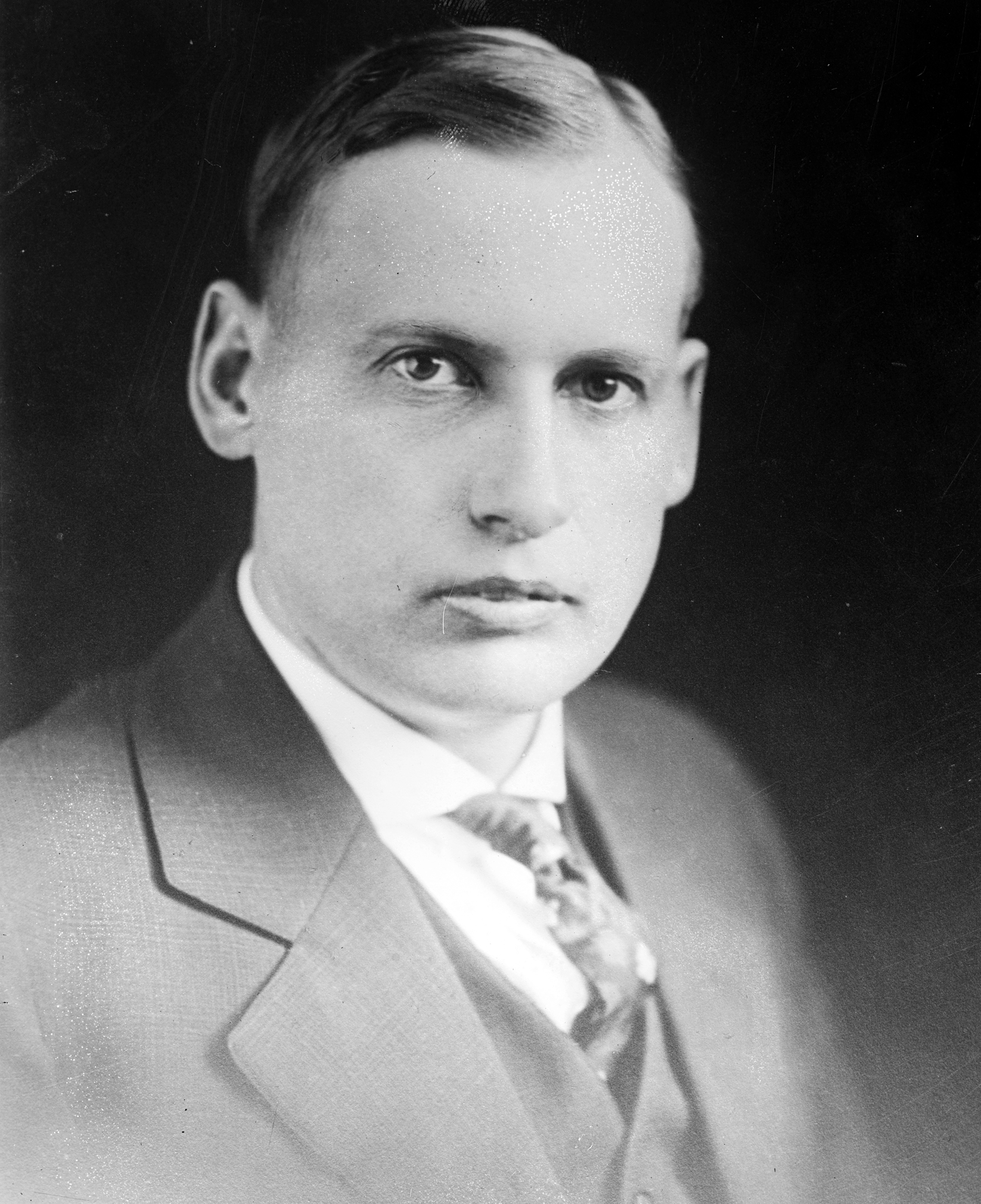
Nominee	Carl Curtis	Keith Neville
Party	Republican	Democratic
Popular vote	255,695	162,990
Percentage	61.07%	38.93%
- County results Curtis: 50–60% 60–70% 70–80% Neville: 50–60%
U.S. senator before election
Hazel Abel
Republican
Elected U.S. Senator
Carl Curtis
Republican

Although elected to finish the class 2 term, Abel did not run for the next term, and Republican Carl Curtis was elected in November to the next term.

1954 United States Senate election in Nebraska
Party	Candidate	Votes	%	±%
Republican	Carl Curtis	255,695	61.07%	−2.50%
Democratic	Keith Neville	162,990	38.93%	+2.51%
Write-in		6	0.00%	—
Majority		92,705	22.14%	−5.01%
Total votes		418,691	100.00%	
Republican hold				

On December 31, 1954, Abel resigned and Curtis was appointed January 1, 1955, two days ahead of his elected term.

== Nevada (special) ==
1954 United States Senate special election in Nevada
- November 2, 1954
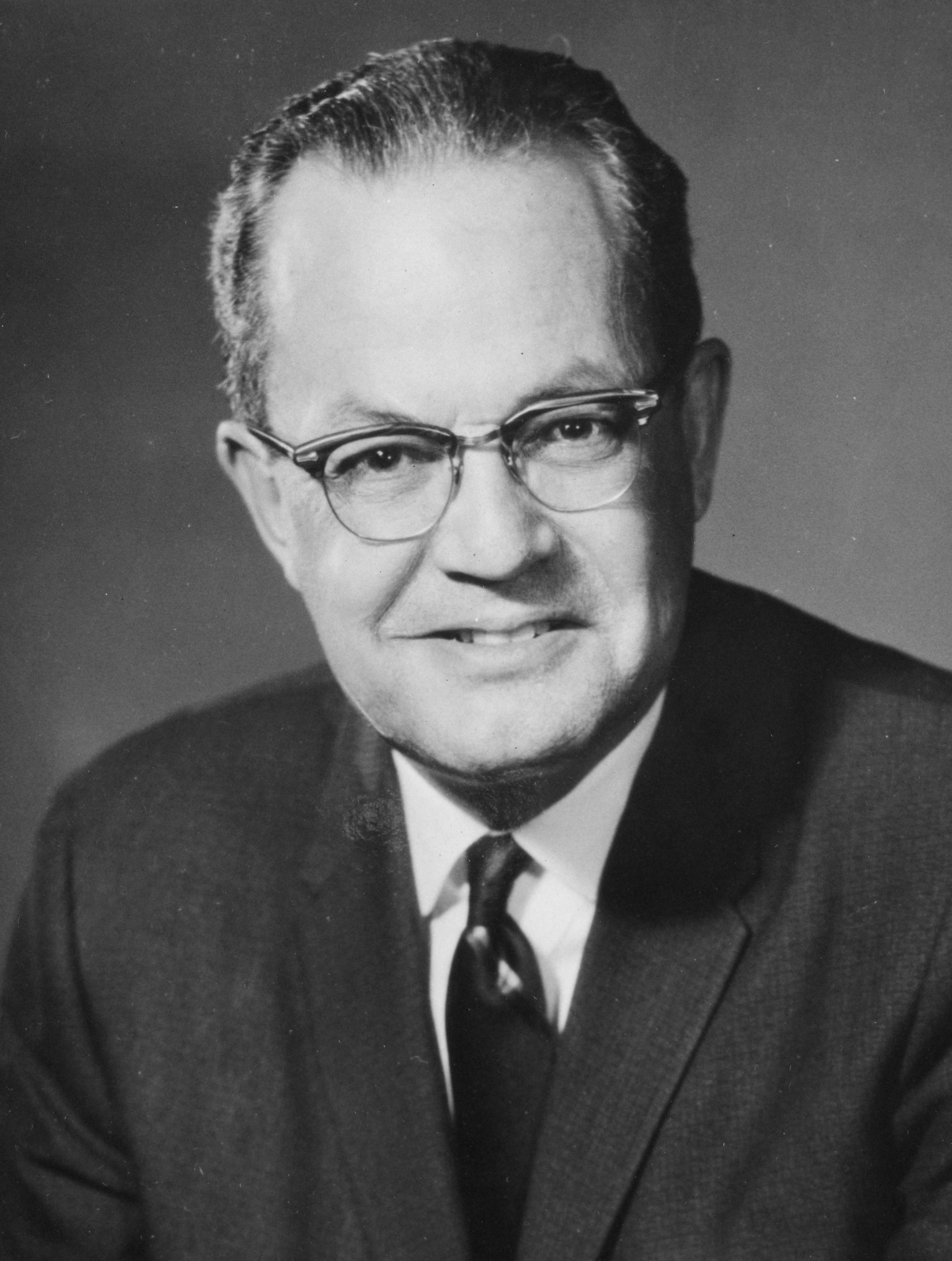

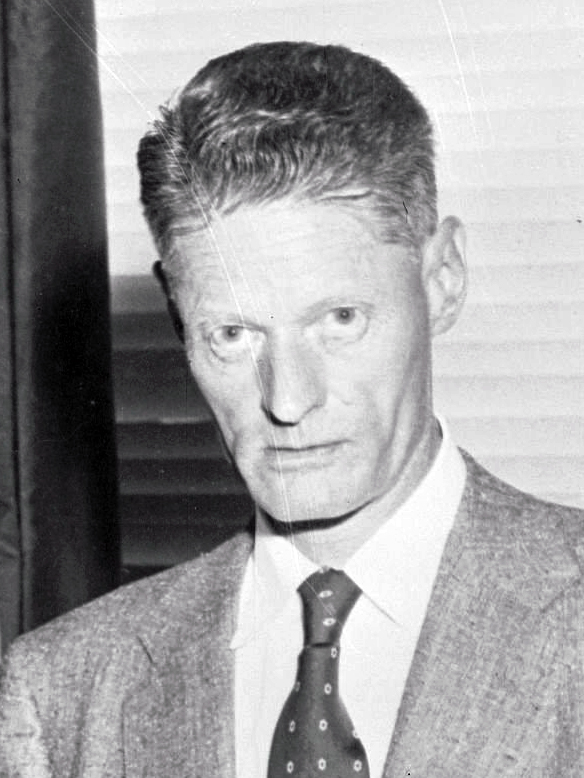
Nominee	Alan Bible	Ernest S. Brown
Party	Democratic	Republican
Popular vote	45,043	32,470
Percentage	58.11%	41.89%
- County results Bible: 50–60% 60–70% 70–80% Brown: 50–60%
U.S. senator before election
Ernest S. Brown
Republican
Elected U.S. Senator
Alan Bible
Democratic

Nevada election
Party	Candidate	Votes	%
Democratic	Alan Bible	45,043	58.11
Republican	Ernest S. Brown (Incumbent)	32,470	41.89
Majority		12,573	16.22
Turnout		77,513	
Democratic gain from Republican			

== New Hampshire ==
=== New Hampshire (regular) ===
1954 United States Senate election in New Hampshire
- November 2, 1954
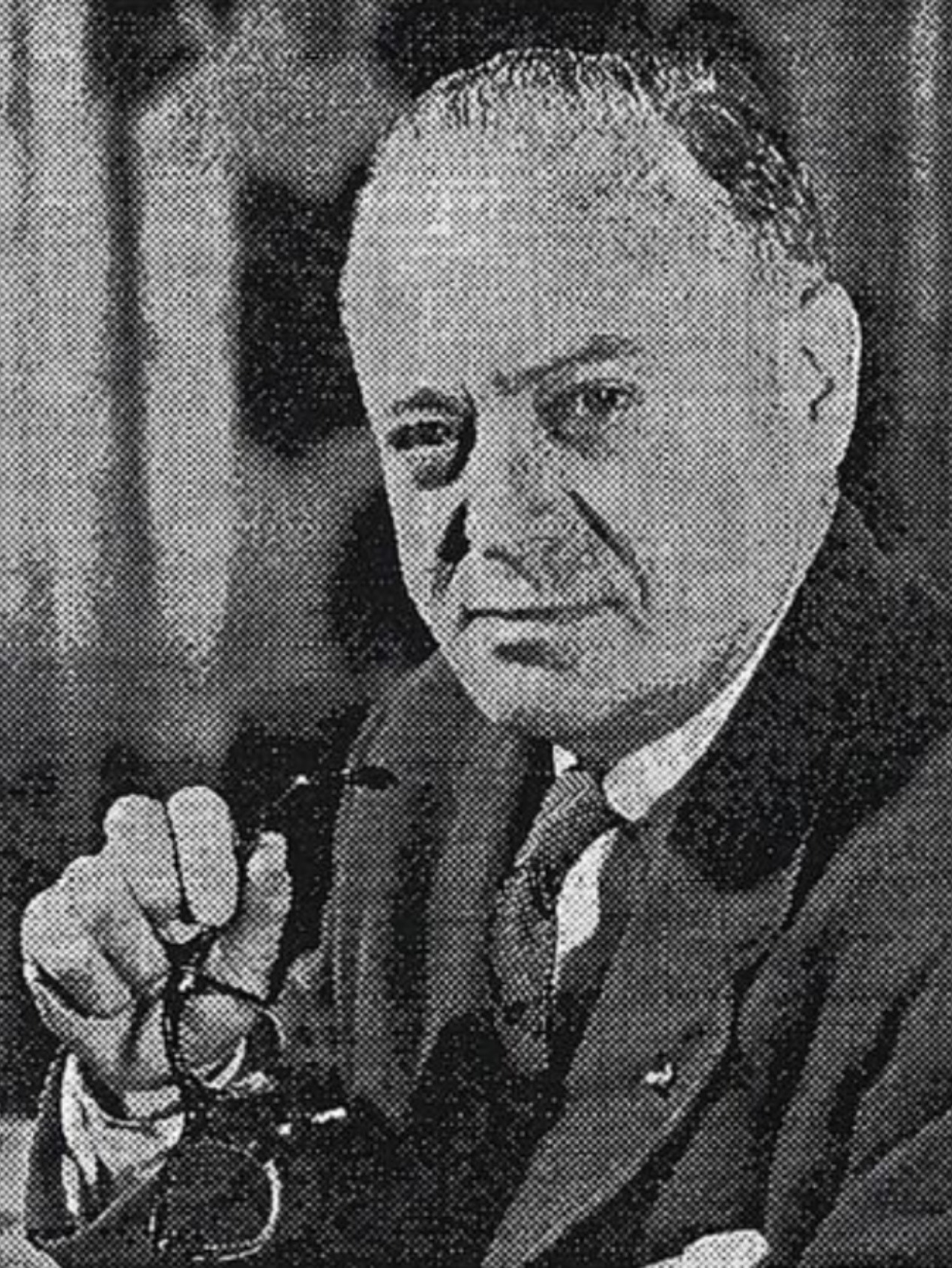

Nominee	Styles Bridges	Gerald L. Morin
Party	Republican	Democratic
Popular vote	117,150	77,386
Percentage	60.22%	39.78%
- Bridges: 50–60% 60–70% 70–80% 80–90% 90-100% Morin: 50–60% 60–70% 70–80%
U.S. senator before election
Styles Bridges
Republican
Elected U.S. Senator
Styles Bridges
Republican

New Hampshire election
Party	Candidate	Votes	%
Republican	Styles Bridges (Incumbent)	117,150	60.22
Democratic	Gerard L. Morin	77,386	39.78
Majority		39,764	20.44
Turnout		194,536	
Republican hold			

=== New Hampshire (special) ===
1954 United States Senate special election in New Hampshire
- November 2, 1954
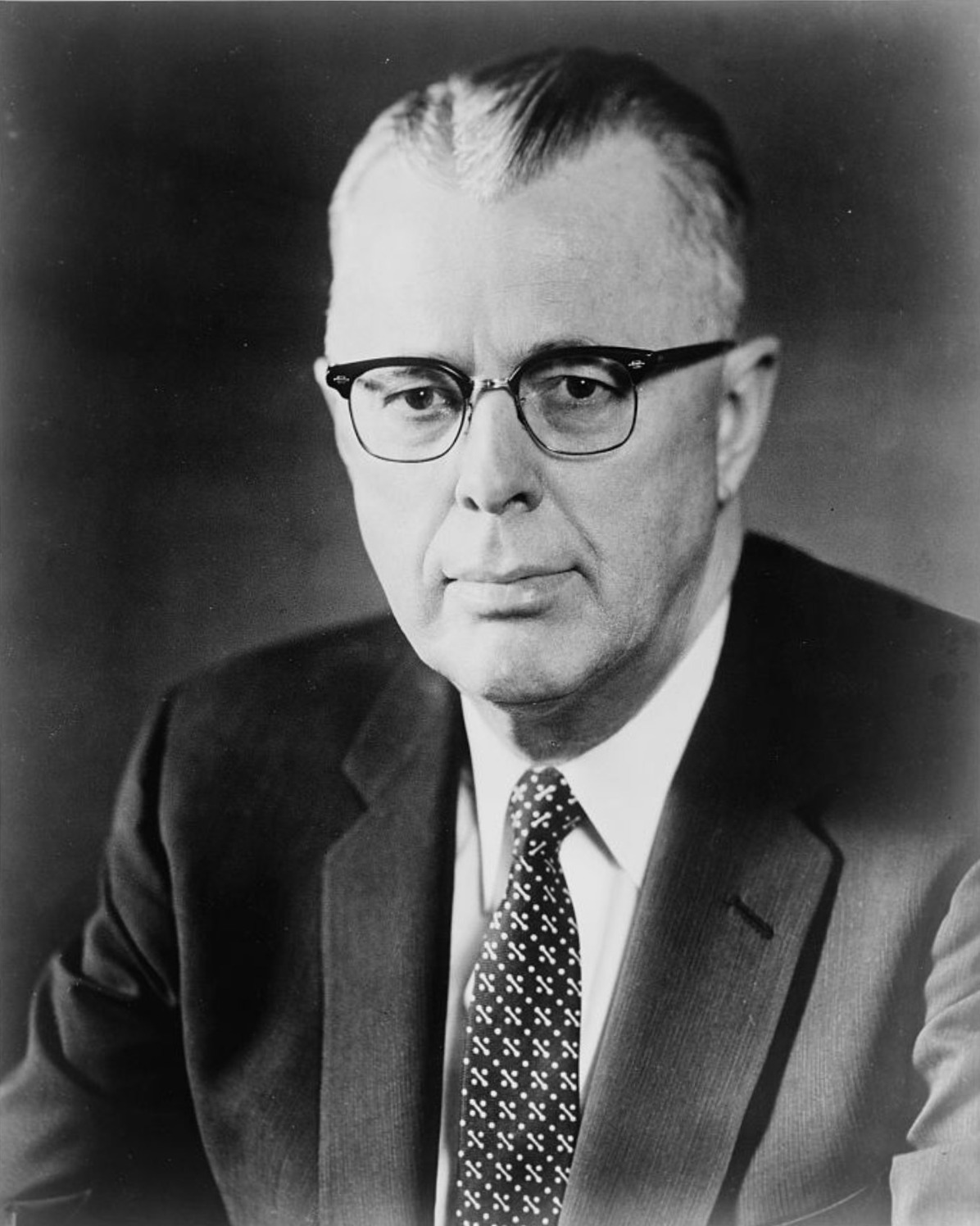

Nominee	Norris Cotton	Stanley J. Betley
Party	Republican	Democratic
Popular vote	114,068	75,490
Percentage	60.18%	39.82%
- Cotton: 50–60% 60–70% 70–80% 80–90% 90-100% Betley: 50–60% 60–70% 70–80% 80–90%
U.S. senator before election
Robert W. Upton
Republican
Elected U.S. Senator
Norris Cotton
Republican

New Hampshire election
Party	Candidate	Votes	%
Republican	Norris Cotton	114,068	60.18
Democratic	Stanley J. Betley	75,490	39.82
Majority		38,578	20.36
Turnout		189,558	
Republican hold			

== New Jersey ==
New Jersey election
- November 2, 1954
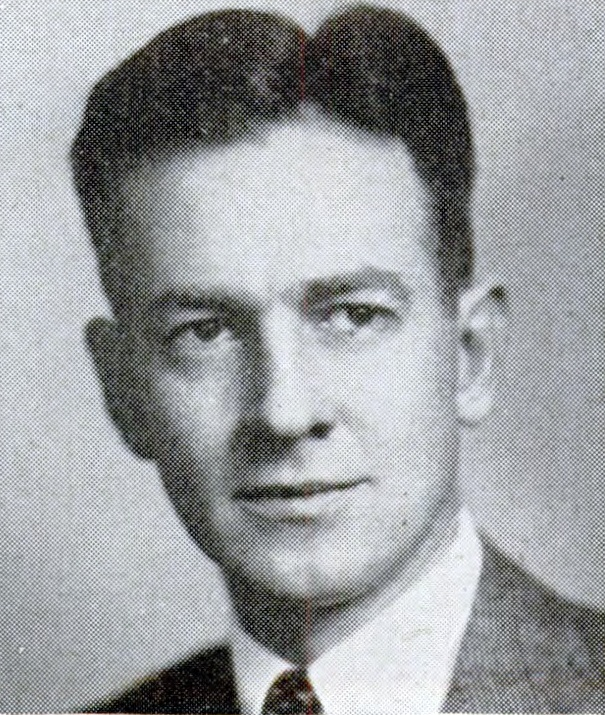

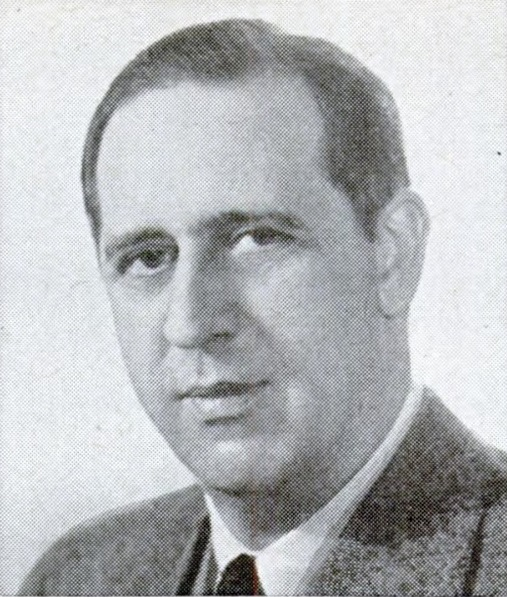
Nominee	Clifford P. Case	Charles R. Howell
Party	Republican	Democratic
Popular vote	861,528	858,158
Percentage	48.66%	48.47%
- County Results; Case: 40–50% 50–60% 60–70% Howell: 40–50% 50–60% 60–70%
U.S. senator before election
Robert C. Hendrickson
Republican
Elected U.S. Senator
Clifford P. Case
Republican

New Jersey election
Party	Candidate	Votes	%
Republican	Clifford Case	861,528	48.66
Democratic	Charles R. Howell	858,158	48.47
American Third	Henry Krajewski	35,421	2.00
Write-In	Fred A. Hartley	7,025	0.40
Socialist Labor	Albert Ronis	4,832	0.27
Socialist Workers	George Breitman	3,590	0.20
Majority		3,370	0.19
Turnout		1,770,554	
Republican hold			

== New Mexico ==
1954 United States Senate election in New Mexico
- November 2, 1954
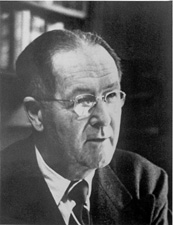

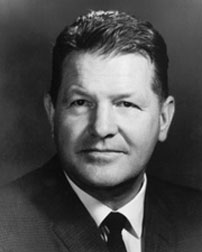
Nominee	Clinton Anderson	Edwin L. Mechem
Party	Democratic	Republican
Popular vote	111,351	83,671
Percentage	57.10%	42.90%
- County results Anderson: 50–60% 60–70% 70–80% Mechem 50–60%
U.S. senator before election
Clinton Anderson
Democratic
Elected U.S. Senator
Clinton Anderson
Democratic

New Mexico election
Party	Candidate	Votes	%
Democratic	Clinton P. Anderson (Incumbent)	111,351	57.10
Republican	Edwin L. Mechem	83,671	42.90
Majority		27,680	14.20
Turnout		195,022	
Democratic hold			

== North Carolina ==
Like Nebraska, North Carolina, had three elections on the ballot. Both senators had died during the 83rd Congress, leading to appointments and special elections.

=== North Carolina (special, class 2) ===
Democrat Willis Smith died June 26, 1953, and Democrat Alton A. Lennon was appointed July 10 to continue the term. In November, Lennon lost the nomination to Democrat W. Kerr Scott to finish the term. Scott took office November 29, 1954.

North Carolina class 2 special election
Party	Candidate	Votes	%
Democratic	W. Kerr Scott	420,268	100
Democratic hold			

=== North Carolina (regular) ===
1954 United States Senate election in North Carolina
- November 2, 1954
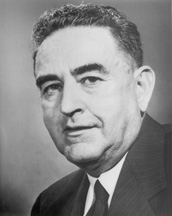

Nominee	W. Kerr Scott	Paul C. West
Party	Democratic	Republican
Popular vote	408,312	211,322
Percentage	65.90%	34.10%
- County results Scott: 50–60% 60–70% 70–80% 80–90% 90–100% West: 50–60% 60–70% 70–80%
Senator before election
Alton A. Lennon
Democratic
Elected Senator
W. Kerr Scott
Democratic

Democrat W. Kerr Scott was also elected to the next term, which would begin January 3, 1955.

North Carolina (class 2) general election
Party	Candidate	Votes	%
Democratic	W. Kerr Scott	408,312	65.90
Republican	Paul C. West	211,322	34.10
Majority		196,990	31.80
Turnout		619,634	
Democratic hold			

=== North Carolina (special, class 3) ===
Democrat Clyde R. Hoey died May 12, 1954, and Democrat Sam Ervin was appointed June 5 to continue the term. In November, Ervin was elected to finish the term.

North Carolina class 3 special election
Party	Candidate	Votes	%
Democratic	Samuel J. Ervin Jr. (Incumbent)	410,574	100
Democratic hold			

== Ohio (special) ==
1954 United States Senate special election in Ohio
- November 6, 1954
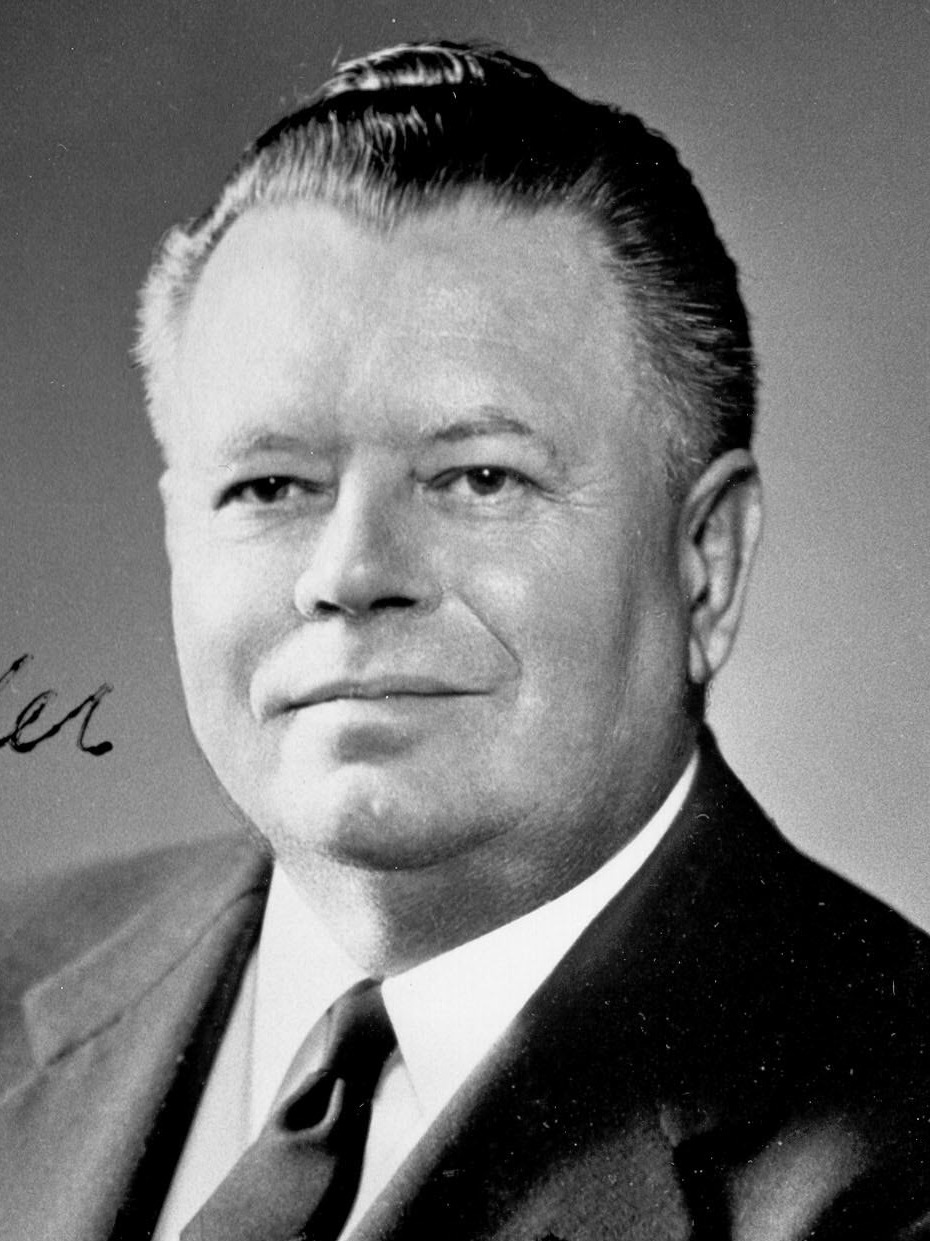

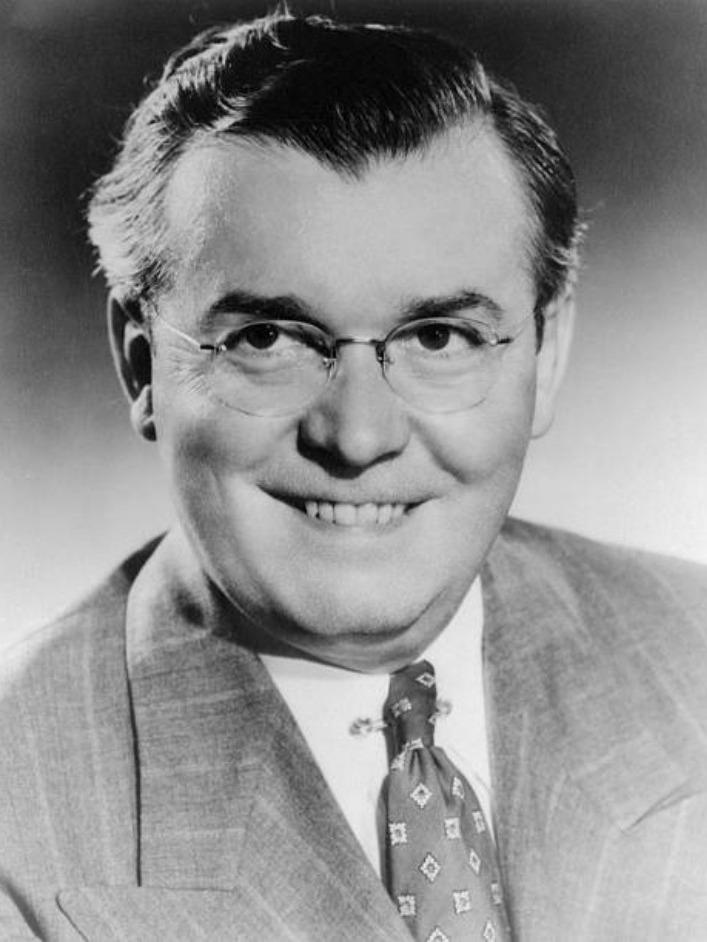
Nominee	George H. Bender	Thomas A. Burke
Party	Republican	Democratic
Popular vote	1,257,874	1,254,904
Percentage	50.06%	49.94%
- County results Bender: 50–60% 60–70% 70–80% Burke: 50–60% 60–70%
U.S. senator before election
Thomas A. Burke
Democratic
Elected U.S. Senator
George H. Bender
Republican

Ohio election
Party	Candidate	Votes	%
Republican	George H. Bender	1,257,874	50.06
Democratic	Thomas A. Burke (Incumbent)	1,254,904	49.94
Majority		2,970	0.12
Turnout		2,512,778	
Republican gain from Democratic			

== Oklahoma ==
1954 United States Senate election in Oklahoma
- November 2, 1954
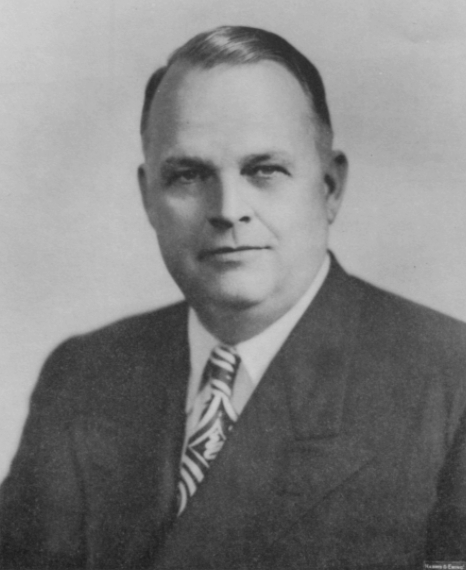

Nominee	Robert S. Kerr	Fred M. Mock
Party	Democratic	Republican
Popular vote	335,127	262,013
Percentage	55.84%	43.66%
- County results Kerr: 50–60% 60–70% 70–80% 80–90% Mock: 50–60% 60–70%
U.S. senator before election
Robert S. Kerr
Democratic
Elected U.S. Senator
Robert S. Kerr
Democratic

Oklahoma election
Party	Candidate	Votes	%
Democratic	Robert S. Kerr (Incumbent)	335,127	55.84
Republican	Fred M. Mock	262,013	43.66
Independent	George V. Fried	1,563	0.26
Independent	George H. Brasier	1,417	0.24
Majority		73,114	12.18
Turnout		600,120	
Democratic hold			

== Oregon ==
1954 United States Senate election in Oregon
- November 2, 1954
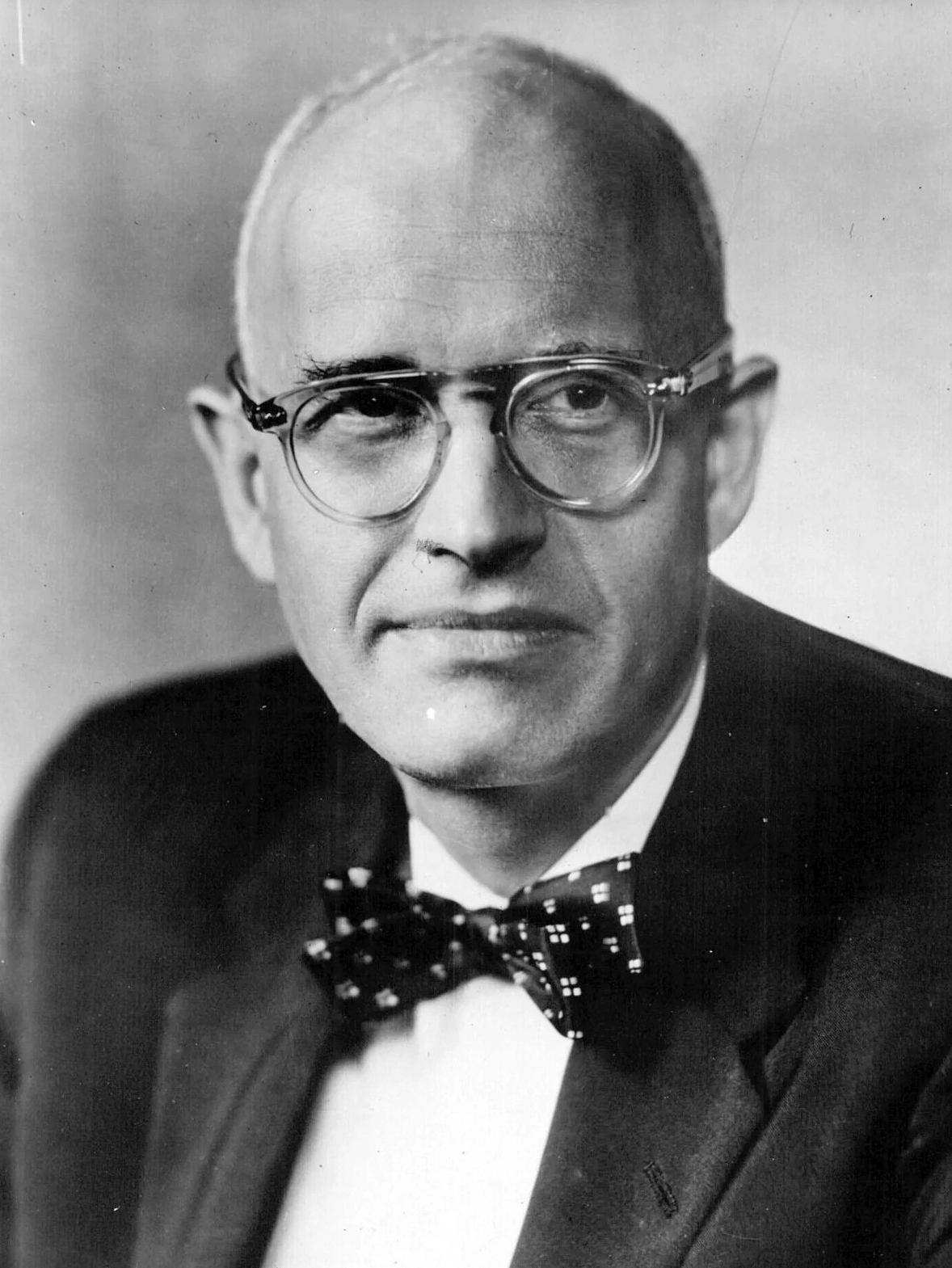

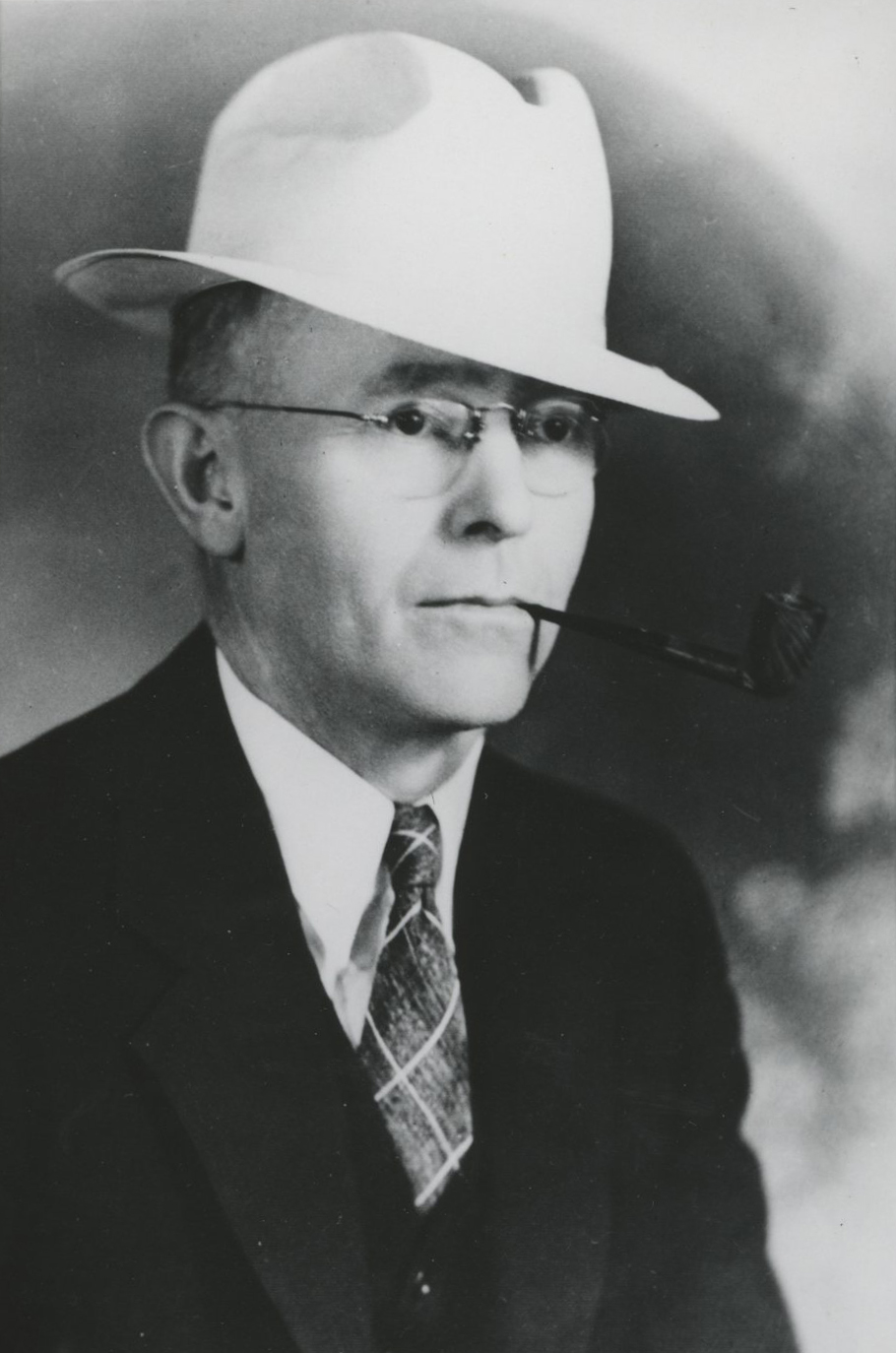
Nominee	Richard L. Neuberger	Guy Cordon
Party	Democratic	Republican
Popular vote	285,775	283,313
Percentage	50.22%	49.78%
- County results Neuberger: 50–60% 60–70% Cordon: 50–60% 60–70%
Senator before election
Guy Cordon
Republican
Elected Senator
Richard L. Neuberger
Democratic

Oregon election
Party	Candidate	Votes	%
Democratic	Richard L. Neuberger	285,775	50.22
Republican	Guy Cordon (Incumbent)	283,313	49.78
Majority		2,462	0.44
Turnout		569,088	
Democratic gain from Republican			

== Rhode Island ==
1954 United States Senate election in Rhode Island
- November 2, 1954
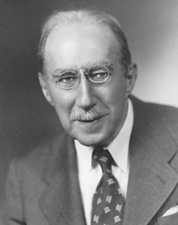

Nominee	Theodore F. Green	Walter I. Sundlun
Party	Democratic	Republican
Popular vote	193,654	132,970
Percentage	59.29%	40.71%
- Green: 50–60% 60–70% Sundlun: 50–60% 60–70%
U.S. senator before election
Theodore F. Green
Democratic
Elected U.S. Senator
Theodore F. Green
Democratic

Rhode Island election
Party	Candidate	Votes	%
Democratic	Theodore Francis Green (Incumbent)	193,654	59.29
Republican	Walter I. Sundlun	132,970	40.71
Majority		60,684	18.58
Turnout		326,624	
Democratic hold			

== South Carolina ==
1954 United States Senate election in South Carolina
- November 2, 1954
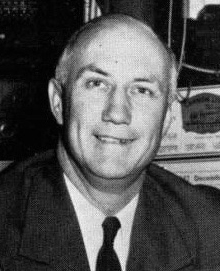

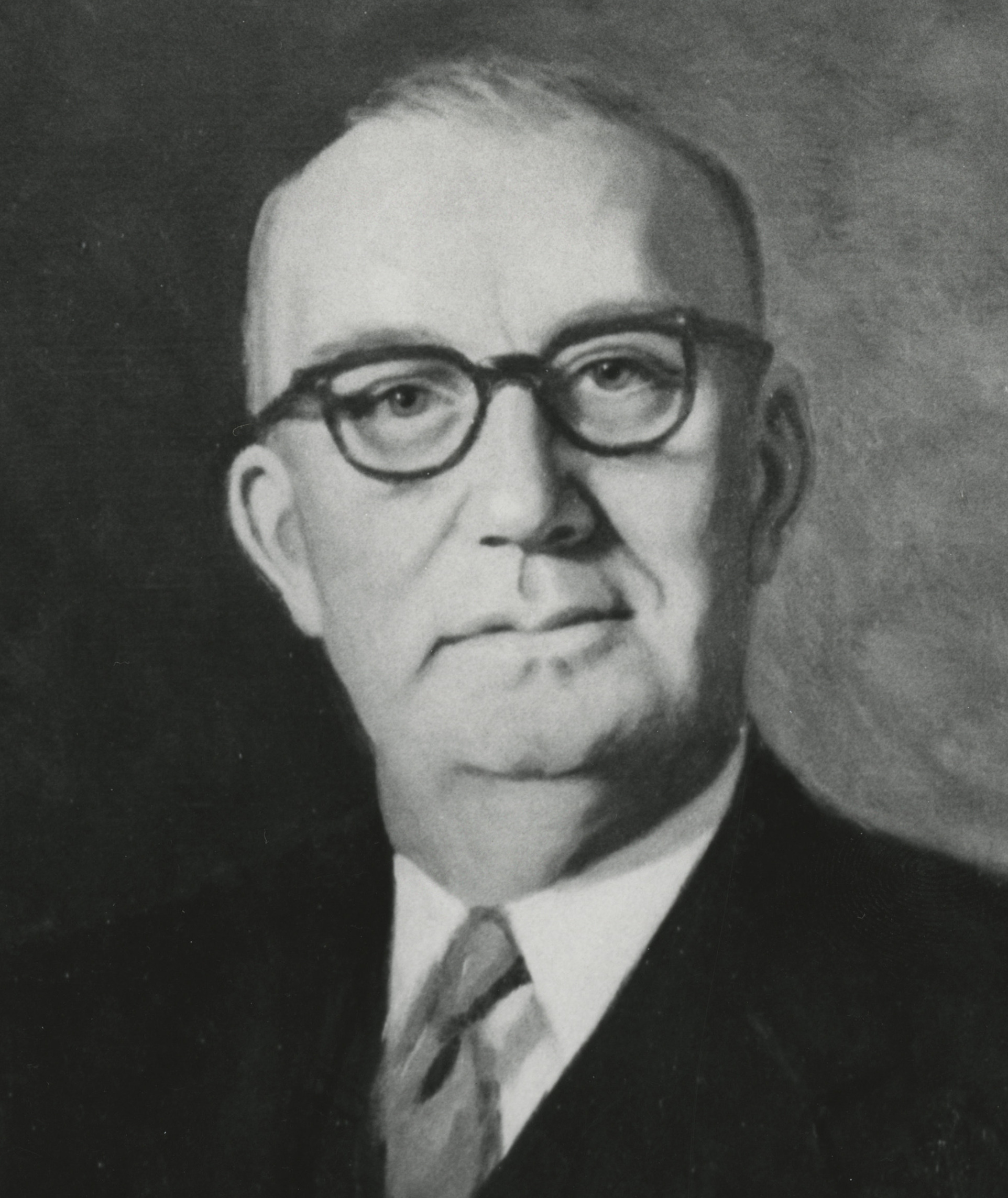
Candidate	Strom Thurmond	Edgar A. Brown
Party	Democratic	Democratic
Popular vote	143,444	83,525
Percentage	63.13%	36.76%
- Thurmond: 50–60% 60–70% 70–80% 80–90% Brown: 50–60% 60–70% >90%
U.S. senator before election
Charles E. Daniel
Democratic
Elected U.S. Senator
Strom Thurmond
Democratic

In South Carolina, Senator Burnet R. Maybank did not face a primary challenge in the summer and was therefore renominated as the Democratic Party's nominee for the election in the fall. However, his death on September 1 left the Democratic Party without a nominee and the executive committee decided to nominate state Senator Edgar A. Brown as their candidate for the election. Many South Carolinians were outraged by the party's decision to forgo a primary election and former Governor Strom Thurmond entered the race as a write-in candidate. He easily won the election and became the first U.S. senator to be elected by a write-in vote (William Knowland of California in 1946 was technically the first, but the ballots in that election were blank with no candidates listed, so essentially every candidate was running a write-in campaign).

Sitting Senator Burnet R. Maybank entered the 1954 contest without a challenge in the Democratic primary nor in the general election. His unexpected death on September 1 caused panic and confusion within the hierarchy of the state Democratic party because the state law required that a party's nominee be certified by September 3. Hours after Maybank's funeral, the state Democratic executive committee met in secret and chose state Senator Edgar A. Brown of Barnwell County as the party's nominee for the general election. Not only was Brown a part of the "Barnwell Ring", but he was also a member of the executive committee.

The state Democratic Party's decision to choose a candidate without holding a special primary election drew widespread criticism across the state. On September 3, The Greenville News ran an editorial advocating that a primary election be called and several newspapers across the state followed suit. At least six county Democratic committees repudiated the action by the state committee and called for a primary election. Despite repeated calls for a primary, the state executive committee voted against holding a primary because they did not think that there was enough time before the general election to hold a primary election.

Immediately after the executive committee voted against holding a primary election, former Governor Strom Thurmond and lumberman Marcus Stone announced their intention to run as Democratic write-in candidates. Thurmond and his supporters stated that the executive committee had several legal alternatives as opposed to the outright appointment of state Senator Brown. In addition, Thurmond promised that if he were elected he would resign in 1956 so that the voters could choose a candidate in the regular primary for the remaining four years of the term.

Thurmond received support from Governor James F. Byrnes and from those who backed his Presidential bid as a Dixiecrat in the 1948 Presidential election. Thurmond framed the race as a "moral issue: democracy versus committee rule" and his write-in campaign was repeatedly assisted by every newspaper in the state, except for those in Anderson. For instance, The News and Courier devoted its front page on November 2 to show voters a sample ballot and it also provided detailed instructions on how to cast a write-in vote. Not only that, but the newspaper also printed an editorial on the front page giving precise reasons why voters should vote for Thurmond instead of Brown.

On the other hand, Brown was supported by the Democratic party regulars and he also gained the endorsement of Senator Olin D. Johnston. Brown based his campaign entirely on the issue of party loyalty, stressing that Thurmond was a Republican ally because he had voted for President Eisenhower in 1952.

Marcus A. Stone, a lumberman in Florence and Dillon, was a candidate in previous Democratic primaries for governor and senator. He did very little campaigning for the general election.

South Carolina U.S. Senate Election, 1954
Party	Candidate	Votes	%	±%
Write-in	Strom Thurmond (Write-In)	143,444	63.13	+63.13
Democratic	Edgar A. Brown	83,525	36.76	−59.64
Write-in	Marcus Stone (Write-In)	240	0.11	+0.11
No party	Write-Ins	23	nil	nil
Majority		59,919	26.37	−66.43
Turnout		227,232		
Democratic hold				

== South Dakota ==
1954 United States Senate election in South Dakota
- November 2, 1954
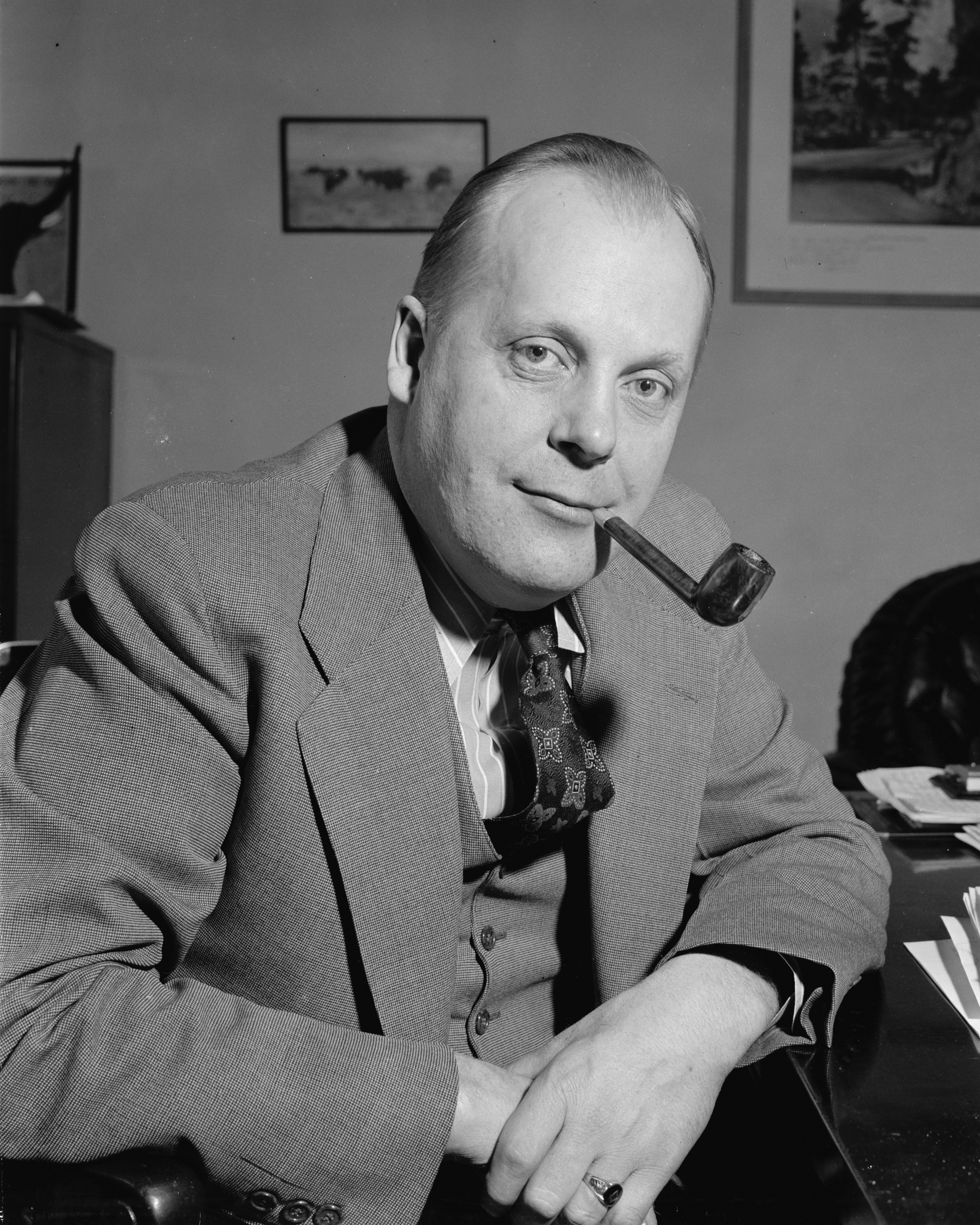
Nominee	Karl E. Mundt	Kenneth Holum
Party	Republican	Democratic
Popular vote	135,071	100,674
Percentage	57.30%	42.70%
- County results Mundt: 50–60% 60–70% 70–80% Holum: 50–60%
U.S. senator before election
Karl E. Mundt
Republican
Elected U.S. Senator
Karl E. Mundt
Republican

South Dakota election
Party	Candidate	Votes	%
Republican	Karl Mundt (Incumbent)	135,071	57.30
Democratic	Kenneth Holum	100,674	42.70
Majority		34,397	14.60
Turnout		235,745	
Republican hold			

== Tennessee ==
1954 United States Senate election in Tennessee
- November 2, 1954
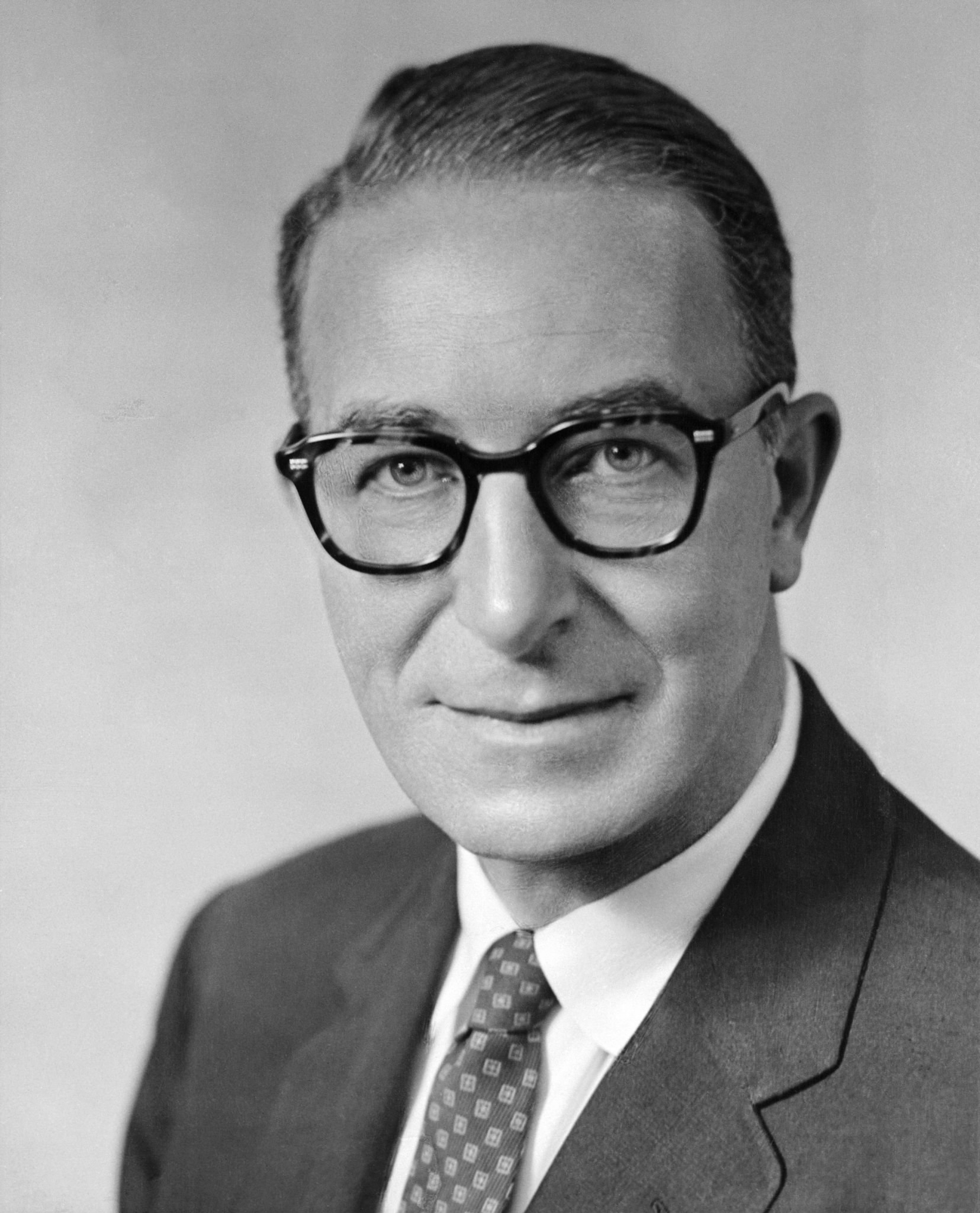

Nominee	Estes Kefauver	Thomas P. Wall Jr
Party	Democratic	Republican
Popular vote	249,121	106,971
Percentage	69.96%	30.04%
- Kefauver: 50–60% 60–70% 70–80% 80–90% >90% Wall Jr: 50–60% 60–70% 70–80%
Senator before election
Estes Kefauver
Democratic
Elected Senator
Estes Kefauver
Democratic

Tennessee election
Party	Candidate	Votes	%
Democratic	Estes Kefauver (Incumbent)	249,121	69.96
Republican	Thomas P. Wall Jr.	106,971	30.04
None	Write-Ins	2	nil
Majority		142,150	39.92
Turnout		356,094	
Democratic hold			

== Texas ==
1954 United States Senate election in Texas
- November 2, 1954
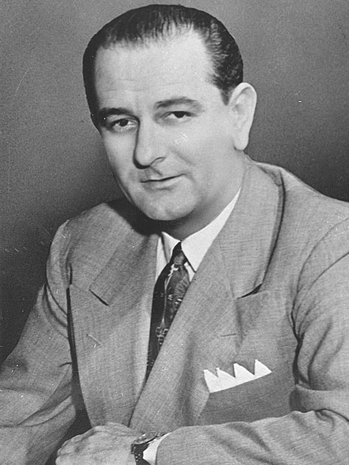

Nominee	Lyndon B. Johnson	Carlos Watson
Party	Democratic	Republican
Popular vote	538,417	95,033
Percentage	84.59%	14.93%
- Johnson: 50–60% 60–70% 70–80% 80–90% >90% Watson: 80–90%
U.S. senator before election
Lyndon B. Johnson
Democratic
Elected U.S. Senator
Lyndon B. Johnson
Democratic

Texas election
Party	Candidate	Votes	%
Democratic	Lyndon Johnson (Incumbent)	538,417	84.59
Republican	Carlos Watson	95,033	14.93
Constitution	Fred T. Spangler	3,025	0.48
Majority		443,384	69.66
Turnout		636,475	
Democratic hold			

== Virginia ==
1954 United States Senate election in Virginia
- November 2, 1954
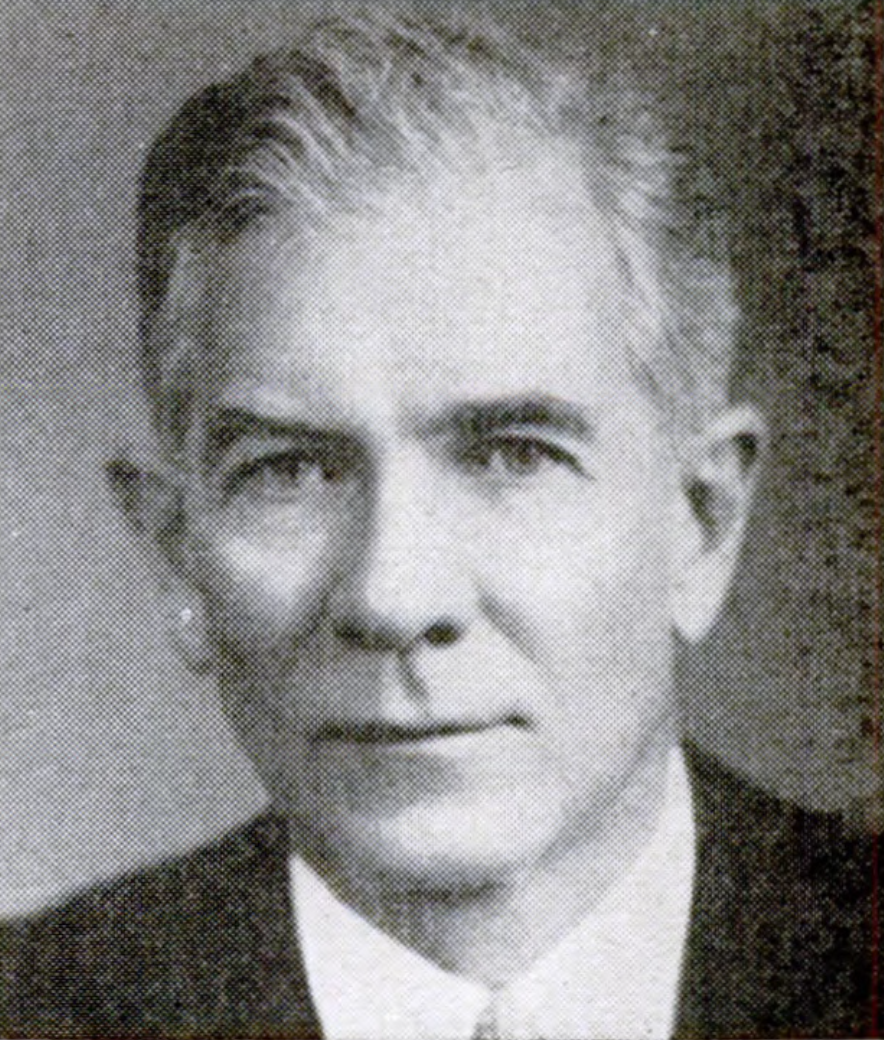

Nominee	Absalom Willis Robertson	Charles W. Lewis, Jr.	Clarke T. Robb
Party	Democratic	Independent Democrat	Independent
Popular vote	244,844	32,681	28,922
Percentage	79.88%	10.66%	9.44%
- County and independent city results Robertson: 50–60% 60–70% 70–80% 80–90% >90% Lewis: 40–50%
U.S. senator before election
Absalom Willis Robertson
Democratic
Elected U.S. Senator
Absalom Willis Robertson
Democratic

In Virginia, Democratic incumbent Senator A. Willis Robertson defeated Independent Democrat Charles Lewis and Social Democrat Clarke Robb and was re-elected to a third term in office.

Virginia election
Party	Candidate	Votes	%	±%
Democratic	A. Willis Robertson (Incumbent)	244,844	79.88	+14.14%
Independent Democratic	Charles W. Lewis Jr.	32,681	10.66	+10.66%
Social Democratic	Clarke T. Robb	28,922	9.44	+9.02%
Write-ins		63	0.02	+0.02%
Majority		212,163	69.22	+34.18%
Turnout		306,510		
Democratic hold		Swing		

== West Virginia ==
1954 United States Senate election in West Virginia
- November 2, 1954
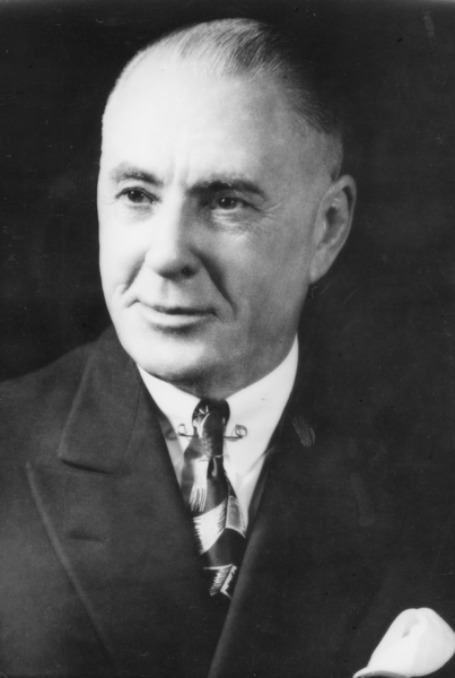

Nominee	Matthew M. Neely	Thomas Sweeney
Party	Democratic	Republican
Popular vote	325,263	268,066
Percentage	54.82%	45.18%
- County results Neely: 50–60% 60–70% 70–80% Sweeney: 50–60% 60–70% 70–80%
U.S. senator before election
Matthew M. Neely
Democratic
Elected U.S. Senator
Matthew M. Neely
Democratic

West Virginia election
Party	Candidate	Votes	%
Democratic	Matthew M. Neely (Incumbent)	325,263	54.82
Republican	Thomas Sweeney	268,066	45.18
Majority		57,197	9.64
Turnout		593,329	
Democratic hold			

== Wyoming ==
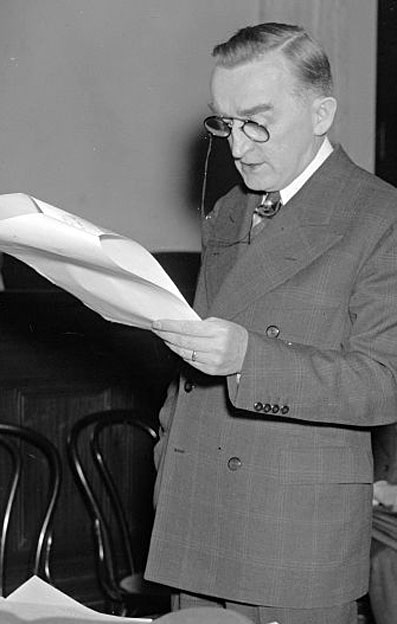
Senator Joseph C. O'Mahoney

There were two elections the same day to the same seat, due to the June 19, 1954, death of Democrat Lester C. Hunt. Both elections were won by Democratic former senator Joseph C. O'Mahoney.

=== Wyoming (special) ===
Republican Edward D. Crippa was appointed June 24, 1954, to continue the term, pending a November 2 special election.

Wyoming special election, November 2, 1954
Party	Candidate	Votes	%
Democratic	Joseph C. O'Mahoney	57,163	51.56
Republican	William Henry Harrison III	53,705	48.44
Majority		3,458	3.12
Turnout		110,868	
Democratic gain from Republican			

=== Wyoming (regular) ===
1954 United States Senate elections in Wyoming
- November 2, 1954
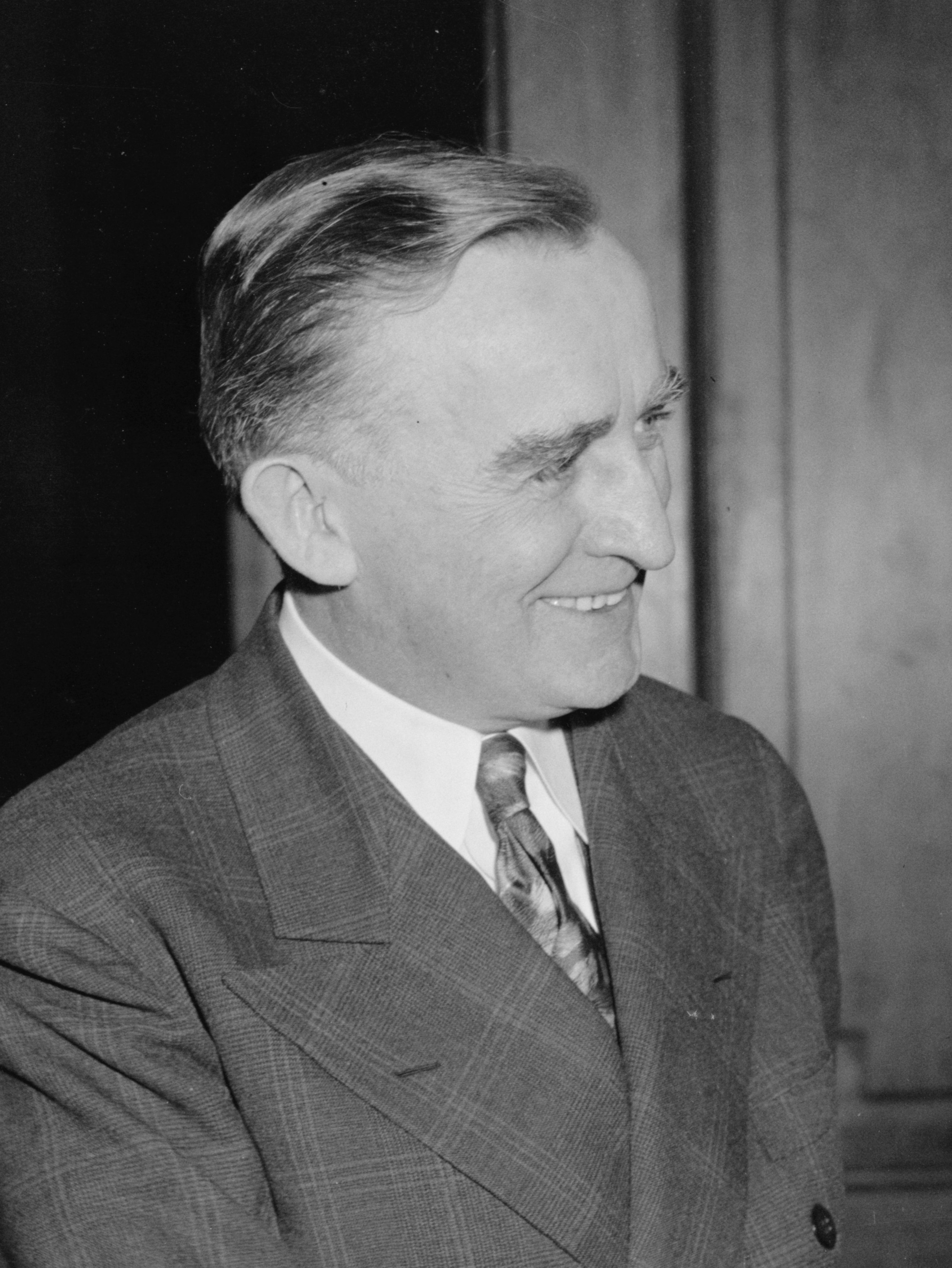

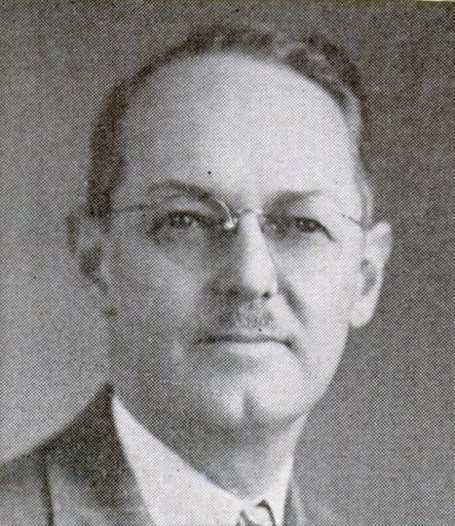
Nominee	Joseph C. O'Mahoney	William Henry Harrison III
Party	Democratic	Republican
Popular vote	57,845	54,407
Percentage	51.53%	48.47%
- County results O'Mahoney: 50–60% 60–70% 70–80% Harrison: 50–60% 60–70%
U.S. senator before election
Edward D. Crippa
Republican
Elected U.S. Senator
Joseph C. O'Mahoney
Democratic

Wyoming general election
Party	Candidate	Votes	%
Democratic	Joseph C. O'Mahoney	57,845	51.53
Republican	William Henry Harrison III	54,407	48.47
Majority		3,438	3.06
Turnout		112,252	
Democratic gain from Republican			

O'Mahoney would serve out the remainder of Hunt's term followed by this one term and then retire after 1960.

== See also ==
- 1954 United States elections
  - 1954 United States House of Representatives elections
- 83rd United States Congress
- 84th United States Congress

== Sources ==
- "A New Test For S.C. Voters". The News and Courier. November 2, 1954. p. 1A.
- "Brown Faces Thurmond In Write-In Race". The News and Courier. November 2, 1954. p. 1A.
- Lander, Ernest McPherson Jr. (1970). A History of South Carolina, 1865-1960. University of South Carolina Press. pp. 182–184. ISBN 0-87249-169-2.
- "Supplemental Report of the Secretary of State to the General Assembly of South Carolina." Reports and Resolutions of South Carolina to the General Assembly of the State of South Carolina. Volume I. Columbia, SC: 1955, pp. 4–5.
- U.S. Senate Biography of Strom Thurmond
