= 83rd =

83rd is the ordinal form of the number 83. 83rd or Eighty-third may also refer to:

- A fraction, 1/83, equal to one of 83 equal parts

== Geography ==
- 83rd meridian east, a line of longitude 83° east of Greenwich
- 83rd meridian west, a line of longitude 83° west of Greenwich
- 83rd parallel north, a circle of latitude that is 83° north of the Earth's equatorial plane, in the Arctic
- 83rd parallel south, a circle of latitude that is 83° south of the Earth's equatorial plane, in the Antarctic
- 83rd Street (disambiguation)

== Government ==
- 83rd Delaware General Assembly, a meeting of the Delaware Senate and the Delaware House of Representatives
- 83rd United States Congress, a meeting of the United States Senate and the United States House of Representatives
  - List of United States senators in the 83rd Congress
- Lindner ethics complaint of the 83rd Minnesota Legislative Session

== Military ==
- 83rd Group Army, People's Republic of China
- 83rd Brigade (disambiguation), several units
- 83rd Division (disambiguation), several units
- 83rd Regiment (disambiguation), several units
- 83rd Squadron (disambiguation), several units

== Other ==
- 83rd century
- 83rd century BC
- 83rd Academy Awards, a ceremony that honored the best films of 2010 in the United States and took place on February 27, 2011
- 83rd Grey Cup, the 1995 Canadian Football League championship game

== See also ==
- 83 (disambiguation)
- AD 83, the year 83 (LXXXIII) of the Julian calendar
