= List of United States representatives in the 83rd Congress =

This is a complete list of United States representatives during the 83rd United States Congress listed by seniority.

As an historical article, the districts and party affiliations listed reflect those during the 83rd Congress (January 3, 1953 – January 3, 1955). Seats and party affiliations on similar lists for other congresses will be different for certain members.

Seniority depends on the date on which members were sworn into office. Since many members are sworn in on the same day, subsequent ranking is based on previous congressional service of the individual and then by alphabetical order by the last name of the representative.

Committee chairmanship in the House is often associated with seniority. However, party leadership is typically not associated with seniority.

Note: The "*" indicates that the representative/delegate may have served one or more non-consecutive terms while in the House of Representatives of the United States Congress.

== U.S. House seniority list ==
U.S. House seniority
Rank	Representative	Party	District	Seniority date (Previous service, if any)	No.# of term(s)	Notes
1	Sam Rayburn	D	TX-04	March 4, 1913	21st term	Dean and Speaker of the House
2	Carl Vinson	D	GA-06	November 3, 1914	21st term	
3	Daniel A. Reed	R	NY-43	March 4, 1919	18th term	
4	Clarence Cannon	D	MO-09	March 4, 1923	16th term	
5	Emanuel Celler	D	NY-11	March 4, 1923	16th term	
6	Robert Crosser	D	OH-21	March 4, 1923; Previous service, 1913–1919.	19th term*	Left the House in 1955.
7	John Taber	R	NY-36	March 4, 1923	16th term	
8	Thomas A. Jenkins	R	OH-10	March 4, 1925	15th term	
9	Joseph William Martin Jr.	R	MA-14	March 4, 1925	15th term	
10	Edith Nourse Rogers	R	MA-05	June 30, 1925	15th term	
11	Clifford R. Hope	R	KS-05	March 4, 1927	14th term	
12	Charles A. Wolverton	R	NJ-01	March 4, 1927	14th term	
13	John William McCormack	D	MA-12	November 6, 1928	14th term	
14	Richard B. Wigglesworth	R	MA-13	November 6, 1928	14th term	
15	Jere Cooper	D	TN-08	March 4, 1929	13th term	
16	Wright Patman	D	TX-01	March 4, 1929	13th term	
17	Howard W. Smith	D	VA-08	March 4, 1931	12th term	
18	Brent Spence	D	KY-05	March 4, 1931	12th term	
19	Jesse P. Wolcott	R	MI-07	March 4, 1931	12th term	
20	Leo E. Allen	R	IL-16	March 4, 1933	11th term	
21	William M. Colmer	D	MS-06	March 4, 1933	11th term	
22	John D. Dingell Sr.	D	MI-15	March 4, 1933	11th term	
23	George Anthony Dondero	R	MI-18	March 4, 1933	11th term	
24	James P. Richards	D	SC-05	March 4, 1933	11th term	
25	Francis E. Walter	D	PA-15	March 4, 1933	11th term	
26	Paul Brown	D	GA-10	July 5, 1933	11th term	
27	Harold D. Cooley	D	NC-04	July 7, 1934	11th term	
28	August H. Andresen	R	MN-01	January 3, 1935; Previous service, 1925–1933.	14th term*	
29	Leslie C. Arends	R	IL-17	January 3, 1935	10th term	
30	Graham A. Barden	D	NC-03	January 3, 1935	10th term	
31	Charles A. Buckley	D	NY-24	January 3, 1935	10th term	
32	W. Sterling Cole	R	NY-37	January 3, 1935	10th term	
33	Edward J. Hart	D	NJ-14	January 3, 1935	10th term	Left the House in 1955.
34	Merlin Hull	R	WI-09	January 3, 1935; Previous service, 1929–1931.	11th term*	Died on May 17, 1953.
35	Clare Hoffman	R	MI-04	January 3, 1935	10th term	
36	George H. Mahon	D	TX-19	January 3, 1935	10th term	
37	Chauncey W. Reed	R	IL-14	January 3, 1935	10th term	
38	Dewey Jackson Short	R	MO-07	January 3, 1935; Previous service, 1929–1931.	11th term*	
39	Charles A. Halleck	R	IN-02	January 29, 1935	10th term	
40	Frank W. Boykin	D	AL-01	July 30, 1935	10th term	
41	Overton Brooks	D	LA-04	January 3, 1937	9th term	
42	Herman P. Eberharter	D	PA-28	January 3, 1937	9th term	
43	Noble Jones Gregory	D	KY-01	January 3, 1937	9th term	
44	Eugene James Keogh	D	NY-09	January 3, 1937	9th term	
45	Michael J. Kirwan	D	OH-19	January 3, 1937	9th term	
46	Noah M. Mason	R	IL-15	January 3, 1937	9th term	
47	William R. Poage	D	TX-11	January 3, 1937	9th term	
48	Edward Herbert Rees	R	KS-04	January 3, 1937	9th term	
49	Paul W. Shafer	R	MI-03	January 3, 1937	9th term	Died on August 17, 1954.
50	Harry R. Sheppard	D	CA-27	January 3, 1937	9th term	
51	Albert Thomas	D	TX-08	January 3, 1937	9th term	
52	Richard M. Simpson	R	PA-18	May 11, 1937	9th term	
53	Ralph A. Gamble	R	NY-26	November 2, 1937	9th term	
54	George M. Grant	D	AL-02	June 14, 1938	9th term	
55	Herman Carl Andersen	R	MN-07	January 3, 1939	8th term	
56	Homer D. Angell	R	OR-03	January 3, 1939	8th term	Left the House in 1955.
57	Clarence J. Brown	R	OH-07	January 3, 1939	8th term	
58	Joseph R. Bryson	D	SC-04	January 3, 1939	8th term	Died on March 10, 1953.
59	Robert B. Chiperfield	R	IL-19	January 3, 1939	8th term	
60	Cliff Clevenger	R	OH-05	January 3, 1939	8th term	
61	Carl Curtis	R	NE-01	January 3, 1939	8th term	Resigned on December 31, 1954.
62	Carl T. Durham	D	NC-06	January 3, 1939	8th term	
63	Ivor D. Fenton	R	PA-12	January 3, 1939	8th term	
64	Ezekiel C. Gathings	D	AR-01	January 3, 1939	8th term	
65	Louis E. Graham	R	PA-25	January 3, 1939	8th term	Left the House in 1955.
66	John Carl Hinshaw	R	CA-20	January 3, 1939	8th term	
67	Ben F. Jensen	R	IA-07	January 3, 1939	8th term	
68	Robert Kean	R	NJ-12	January 3, 1939	8th term	
69	Paul J. Kilday	D	TX-20	January 3, 1939	8th term	
70	Karl M. LeCompte	R	IA-04	January 3, 1939	8th term	
71	Thomas E. Martin	R	IA-01	January 3, 1939	8th term	Left the House in 1955.
72	John L. McMillan	D	SC-06	January 3, 1939	8th term	
73	Wilbur Mills	D	AR-02	January 3, 1939	8th term	
74	William F. Norrell	D	AR-06	January 3, 1939	8th term	
75	Henry O. Talle	R	IA-02	January 3, 1939	8th term	
76	John Martin Vorys	R	OH-12	January 3, 1939	8th term	
77	Albert Sidney Camp	D	GA-04	August 1, 1939	8th term	Died on July 24, 1954.
78	Clarence E. Kilburn	R	NY-33	February 13, 1940	8th term	
79	Clifford Davis	D	TN-09	February 14, 1940	8th term	
80	Frances P. Bolton	R	OH-22	February 27, 1940	8th term	
81	J. Harry McGregor	R	OH-17	February 27, 1940	8th term	
82	Herbert Covington Bonner	D	NC-01	November 5, 1940	8th term	
83	C. W. Bishop	R	IL-25	January 3, 1941	7th term	Left the House in 1955.
84	Gordon Canfield	R	NJ-08	January 3, 1941	7th term	
85	Paul Cunningham	R	IA-05	January 3, 1941	7th term	
86	Aime Forand	D	RI-01	January 3, 1941; Previous service, 1937–1939.	8th term*	
87	Oren Harris	D	AR-04	January 3, 1941	7th term	
88	Felix Edward Hébert	D	LA-01	January 3, 1941	7th term	
89	William S. Hill	R	CO-02	January 3, 1941	7th term	
90	Augustine B. Kelley	D	PA-21	January 3, 1941	7th term	
91	Joseph O'Hara	R	MN-02	January 3, 1941	7th term	
92	Percy Priest	D	TN-05	January 3, 1941	7th term	
93	L. Mendel Rivers	D	SC-01	January 3, 1941	7th term	
94	Earl Wilson	R	IN-09	January 3, 1941	7th term	
95	Lawrence H. Smith	R	WI-01	August 29, 1941	7th term	
96	Jamie Whitten	D	MS-02	November 4, 1941	7th term	
97	Thomas J. Lane	D	MA-07	December 30, 1941	7th term	
98	Cecil R. King	D	CA-17	August 25, 1942	7th term	
99	Thomas Abernethy	D	MS-01	January 3, 1943	6th term	
100	James C. Auchincloss	R	NJ-03	January 3, 1943	6th term	
101	William L. Dawson	D	IL-01	January 3, 1943	6th term	
102	Harris Ellsworth	R	OR-04	January 3, 1943	6th term	
103	Michael A. Feighan	D	OH-20	January 3, 1943	6th term	
104	Antonio M. Fernández	D	NM	January 3, 1943	6th term	
105	O. C. Fisher	D	TX-21	January 3, 1943	6th term	
106	Leon H. Gavin	R	PA-23	January 3, 1943	6th term	
107	Angier Goodwin	R	MA-08	January 3, 1943	6th term	Left the House in 1955.
108	Thomas S. Gordon	D	IL-08	January 3, 1943	6th term	
109	Harold Hagen	R	MN-09	January 3, 1943	6th term	Left the House in 1955.
110	Robert Hale	R	ME-01	January 3, 1943	6th term	
111	Brooks Hays	D	AR-05	January 3, 1943	6th term	
112	Charles B. Hoeven	R	IA-08	January 3, 1943	6th term	
113	Chester E. Holifield	D	CA-19	January 3, 1943	6th term	
114	Hal Holmes	R	WA-04	January 3, 1943	6th term	
115	Walt Horan	R	WA-05	January 3, 1943	6th term	
116	Justin L. Johnson	R	CA-11	January 3, 1943	6th term	
117	Walter Judd	R	MN-05	January 3, 1943	6th term	
118	Bernard W. Kearney	R	NY-32	January 3, 1943	6th term	
119	Ray Madden	D	IN-01	January 3, 1943	6th term	
120	Chester Earl Merrow	R	NH-01	January 3, 1943	6th term	
121	Arthur L. Miller	R	NE-04	January 3, 1943	6th term	
122	Tom J. Murray	D	TN-07	January 3, 1943	6th term	
123	James H. Morrison	D	LA-06	January 3, 1943	6th term	
124	Thomas J. O'Brien	D	IL-06	January 3, 1943; Previous service, 1933–1939.	9th term*	
125	Alvin O'Konski	R	WI-10	January 3, 1943	6th term	
126	Philip J. Philbin	D	MA-03	January 3, 1943	6th term	
127	John J. Phillips	R	CA-29	January 3, 1943	6th term	
128	Sid Simpson	R	IL-20	January 3, 1943	6th term	
129	Dean P. Taylor	R	NY-31	January 3, 1943	6th term	
130	Alvin F. Weichel	R	OH-13	January 3, 1943	6th term	Left the House in 1955.
131	Charles W. Vursell	R	IL-23	January 3, 1943	6th term	
132	W. Arthur Winstead	D	MS-05	January 3, 1943	6th term	
133	Clair Engle	D	CA-02	August 31, 1943	6th term	
134	Errett P. Scrivner	R	KS-02	September 14, 1943	6th term	
135	Samuel K. McConnell Jr.	R	PA-13	January 18, 1944	6th term	
136	George W. Andrews	D	AL-03	March 14, 1944	6th term	
137	John J. Rooney	D	NY-14	June 6, 1944	6th term	
138	John W. Byrnes	R	WI-08	January 3, 1945	5th term	
139	Clifford P. Case	R	NJ-06	January 3, 1945	5th term	Resigned on August 16, 1953.
140	Frank Chelf	D	KY-04	January 3, 1945	5th term	
141	Robert J. Corbett	R	PA-29	January 3, 1945; Previous service, 1939–1941.	6th term*	
142	James I. Dolliver	R	IA-06	January 3, 1945	5th term	
143	George Hyde Fallon	D	MD-04	January 3, 1945	5th term	
144	James G. Fulton	R	PA-27	January 3, 1945	5th term	
145	Ralph W. Gwinn	R	NY-27	January 3, 1945	5th term	
146	T. Millet Hand	R	NJ-02	January 3, 1945	5th term	
147	John W. Heselton	R	MA-01	January 3, 1945	5th term	
148	Henry J. Latham	R	NY-04	January 3, 1945	5th term	
149	John E. Lyle Jr.	D	TX-14	January 3, 1945	5th term	Left the House in 1955.
150	Gordon L. McDonough	R	CA-15	January 3, 1945	5th term	
151	Thomas E. Morgan	D	PA-26	January 3, 1945	5th term	
152	George Paul Miller	D	CA-08	January 3, 1945	5th term	
153	Adam Clayton Powell Jr.	D	NY-16	January 3, 1945	5th term	
154	Charles Melvin Price	D	IL-24	January 3, 1945	5th term	
155	Albert Rains	D	AL-05	January 3, 1945	5th term	
156	Dwight L. Rogers	D	FL-06	January 3, 1945	5th term	Died on December 1, 1954.
157	Robert L. F. Sikes	D	FL-03	January 3, 1945; Previous service, 1941–1944.	6th term*	
158	James William Trimble	D	AR-03	January 3, 1945	5th term	
159	John E. Fogarty	D	RI-02	February 7, 1945; Previous service, 1941–1944.	7th term*	
160	J. Vaughan Gary	D	VA-03	March 6, 1945	5th term	
161	Wesley A. D'Ewart	R	MT-02	June 5, 1945	5th term	Left the House in 1955.
162	A. Walter Norblad	R	OR-01	January 18, 1946	5th term	
163	Arthur G. Klein	D	NY-19	February 19, 1946; Previous service, 1941–1945.	7th term*	
164	Olin E. Teague	D	TX-06	August 24, 1946	5th term	
165	Burr Harrison	D	VA-07	November 5, 1946	5th term	
166	Thomas B. Stanley	D	VA-05	November 5, 1946	5th term	Resigned on February 3, 1953.
167	Carl Albert	D	OK-03	January 3, 1947	4th term	
168	John J. Allen Jr.	R	CA-07	January 3, 1947	4th term	
169	Laurie C. Battle	D	AL-09	January 3, 1947	4th term	Left the House in 1955.
170	John B. Bennett	R	MI-12	January 3, 1947; Previous service, 1943–1945.	5th term*	
171	John Blatnik	D	MN-08	January 3, 1947	4th term	
172	Hale Boggs	D	LA-02	January 3, 1947; Previous service, 1941–1943.	5th term*	
173	Norris Cotton	R	NH-02	January 3, 1947	4th term	Resigned on November 7, 1954.
174	Ernest K. Bramblett	R	CA-13	January 3, 1947	4th term	Left the House in 1955.
175	Omar Burleson	D	TX-17	January 3, 1947	4th term	
176	Frederic René Coudert Jr.	R	NY-17	January 3, 1947	4th term	
177	Paul B. Dague	R	PA-09	January 3, 1947	4th term	
178	James C. Davis	D	GA-05	January 3, 1947	4th term	
179	Charles B. Deane	D	NC-08	January 3, 1947	4th term	
180	Harold Donohue	D	MA-04	January 3, 1947	4th term	
181	Joe L. Evins	D	TN-04	January 3, 1947	4th term	
182	Katharine St. George	R	NY-28	January 3, 1947	4th term	
183	Porter Hardy Jr.	D	VA-02	January 3, 1947	4th term	
184	Donald L. Jackson	R	CA-16	January 3, 1947	4th term	
185	Jacob K. Javits	R	NY-21	January 3, 1947	4th term	Resigned on December 31, 1954.
186	Frank M. Karsten	D	MO-01	January 3, 1947	4th term	
187	Carroll D. Kearns	R	PA-24	January 3, 1947	4th term	
188	Kenneth Keating	R	NY-38	January 3, 1947	4th term	
189	Henderson Lovelace Lanham	D	GA-07	January 3, 1947	4th term	
190	Wingate H. Lucas	D	TX-12	January 3, 1947	4th term	Left the House in 1955.
191	Edward Tylor Miller	R	MD-01	January 3, 1947	4th term	
192	Otto Passman	D	LA-05	January 3, 1947	4th term	
193	James T. Patterson	R	CT-05	January 3, 1947	4th term	
194	Norris Poulson	R	CA-24	January 3, 1947; Previous service, 1943–1945.	5th term*	Resigned on June 11, 1953.
195	Prince Preston	D	GA-01	January 3, 1947	4th term	
196	R. Walter Riehlman	R	NY-35	January 3, 1947	4th term	
197	Antoni Sadlak	R	CT	January 3, 1947	4th term	
198	Hugh Scott	R	PA-06	January 3, 1947; Previous service, 1941–1945.	6th term*	
199	Wint Smith	R	KS-06	January 3, 1947	4th term	
200	Thor C. Tollefson	R	WA-06	January 3, 1947	4th term	
201	William M. Wheeler	D	GA-08	January 3, 1947	4th term	Left the House in 1955.
202	John Bell Williams	D	MS-04	January 3, 1947	4th term	
203	Joseph Franklin Wilson	D	TX-05	January 3, 1947	4th term	Left the House in 1955.
204	James E. Van Zandt	R	PA-20	January 3, 1947; Previous service, 1939–1943.	7th term*	
205	Robert E. Jones Jr.	D	AL-08	January 28, 1947	4th term	
206	Glenn Robert Davis	R	WI-02	April 22, 1947	4th term	
207	Russell V. Mack	R	WA-03	July 7, 1947	4th term	
208	Edward Garmatz	D	MD-03	July 15, 1947	4th term	
209	Kenneth M. Regan	D	TX-16	August 23, 1947	4th term	Left the House in 1955.
210	Clark W. Thompson	D	TX-09	August 23, 1947; Previous service, 1933–1935.	5th term*	
211	Ralph Harvey	R	IN-10	November 4, 1947	4th term	
212	William Moore McCulloch	R	OH-04	November 4, 1947	4th term	
213	Abraham J. Multer	D	NY-13	November 4, 1947	4th term	
214	Donald W. Nicholson	R	MA-09	November 18, 1947	4th term	
215	Watkins Moorman Abbitt	D	VA-04	February 17, 1948	4th term	
216	Paul C. Jones	D	MO-10	November 2, 1948	4th term	
217	Lloyd Bentsen	D	TX-15	December 4, 1948	4th term	Left the House in 1955.
218	Hugh Joseph Addonizio	D	NJ-11	January 3, 1949	3rd term	
219	Wayne N. Aspinall	D	CO-04	January 3, 1949	3rd term	
220	Cleveland M. Bailey	D	WV-03	January 3, 1949; Previous service, 1945–1947.	4th term*	
221	William A. Barrett	D	PA-01	January 3, 1949; Previous service, 1945–1947.	4th term*	
222	Charles Edward Bennett	D	FL-02	January 3, 1949	3rd term	
223	Richard Walker Bolling	D	MO-05	January 3, 1949	3rd term	
224	Usher L. Burdick	R	ND	January 3, 1949; Previous service, 1935–1945.	8th term*	
225	Frank E. Carlyle	D	NC-07	January 3, 1949	3rd term	
226	A. S. J. Carnahan	D	MO-08	January 3, 1949; Previous service, 1945–1947.	4th term*	
227	Richard Thurmond Chatham	D	NC-05	January 3, 1949	3rd term	
228	Earl Chudoff	D	PA-04	January 3, 1949	3rd term	
229	James J. Delaney	D	NY-07	January 3, 1949; Previous service, 1945–1947.	4th term*	
230	Isidore Dollinger	D	NY-23	January 3, 1949	3rd term	
231	Clyde Doyle	D	CA-23	January 3, 1949; Previous service, 1945–1947.	4th term*	
232	Carl Elliott	D	AL-07	January 3, 1949	3rd term	
233	Gerald Ford	R	MI-05	January 3, 1949	3rd term	
234	James B. Frazier Jr.	D	TN-03	January 3, 1949	3rd term	
235	James S. Golden	R	KY-08	January 3, 1949	3rd term	Left the House in 1955.
236	William T. Granahan	D	PA-02	January 3, 1949; Previous service, 1945–1947.	4th term*	
237	William J. Green Jr.	D	PA-05	January 3, 1949; Previous service, 1945–1947.	4th term*	
238	H. R. Gross	R	IA-03	January 3, 1949	3rd term	
239	Cecil M. Harden	R	IN-06	January 3, 1949	3rd term	
240	Wayne Hays	D	OH-18	January 3, 1949	3rd term	
241	Albert S. Herlong Jr.	D	FL-05	January 3, 1949	3rd term	
242	Richard W. Hoffman	R	IL-10	January 3, 1949	3rd term	
243	Charles R. Howell	D	NJ-04	January 3, 1949	3rd term	Left the House in 1955.
244	Benjamin F. James	R	PA-07	January 3, 1949	3rd term	
245	Edgar A. Jonas	R	IL-12	January 3, 1949	3rd term	Left the House in 1955.
246	Harold Lovre	R	SD-01	January 3, 1949	3rd term	
247	Peter F. Mack Jr.	D	IL-21	January 3, 1949	3rd term	
248	Fred Marshall	D	MN-06	January 3, 1949	3rd term	
249	Eugene McCarthy	D	MN-04	January 3, 1949	3rd term	
250	Morgan M. Moulder	D	MO-11	January 3, 1949	3rd term	
251	Charles P. Nelson	R	ME-02	January 3, 1949	3rd term	
252	George D. O'Brien	D	MI-13	January 3, 1949; Previous service, 1937–1939 and 1941–1947.	7th term**	
253	Harold Patten	D	AZ-02	January 3, 1949	3rd term	Left the House in 1955.
254	Carl D. Perkins	D	KY-07	January 3, 1949	3rd term	
255	James G. Polk	D	OH-06	January 3, 1949; Previous service, 1931–1941.	8th term*	
256	Louis C. Rabaut	D	MI-14	January 3, 1949; Previous service, 1935–1947.	9th term*	
257	George M. Rhodes	D	PA-14	January 3, 1949	3rd term	
258	Peter W. Rodino	D	NJ-10	January 3, 1949	3rd term	
259	Hubert B. Scudder	R	CA-01	January 3, 1949	3rd term	
260	Robert T. Secrest	D	OH-15	January 3, 1949; Previous service, 1933–1942.	8th term*	Resigned on September 26, 1954.
261	Harley Orrin Staggers	D	WV-02	January 3, 1949	3rd term	
262	Tom Steed	D	OK-04	January 3, 1949	3rd term	
263	James Patrick Sutton	D	TN-06	January 3, 1949	3rd term	Left the House in 1955.
264	Homer Thornberry	D	TX-10	January 3, 1949	3rd term	
265	Harold H. Velde	R	IL-18	January 3, 1949	3rd term	
266	Victor Wickersham	D	OK-06	January 3, 1949; Previous service, 1941–1947.	6th term*	
267	Roy Wier	D	MN-03	January 3, 1949	3rd term	
268	Gardner R. Withrow	R	WI-03	January 3, 1949; Previous service, 1931–1939.	7th term*	
269	Edwin E. Willis	D	LA-03	January 3, 1949	3rd term	
270	Sidney R. Yates	D	IL-09	January 3, 1949	3rd term	
271	Clement J. Zablocki	D	WI-04	January 3, 1949	3rd term	
272	Louis B. Heller	D	NY-08	February 15, 1949	3rd term	Resigned on July 21, 1954.
273	Franklin D. Roosevelt Jr.	D	NY-20	May 17, 1949	3rd term	Left the House in 1955.
274	John P. Saylor	R	PA-22	September 13, 1949	3rd term	
275	Edna F. Kelly	D	NY-10	November 8, 1949	3rd term	
276	John F. Shelley	D	CA-05	November 8, 1949	3rd term	
277	William B. Widnall	R	NJ-07	February 6, 1950	3rd term	
278	William H. Bates	R	MA-06	February 14, 1950	3rd term	
279	Edward J. Robeson Jr.	D	VA-01	May 2, 1950	3rd term	
280	Myron V. George	R	KS-03	November 7, 1950	3rd term	
281	Woodrow W. Jones	D	NC-11	November 7, 1950	3rd term	
282	E. Ross Adair	R	IN-04	January 3, 1951	2nd term	
283	William Hanes Ayres	R	OH-14	January 3, 1951	2nd term	
284	Howard Baker Sr.	R	TN-02	January 3, 1951	2nd term	
285	John V. Beamer	R	IN-05	January 3, 1951	2nd term	
286	Page Belcher	R	OK-01	January 3, 1951	2nd term	
287	George H. Bender	R	OH-23	January 3, 1951; Previous service, 1939–1949.	7th term*	Resigned on December 15, 1954.
288	Ellis Yarnal Berry	R	SD-02	January 3, 1951	2nd term	
289	Jackson Edward Betts	R	OH-08	January 3, 1951	2nd term	
290	Frank T. Bow	R	OH-16	January 3, 1951	2nd term	
291	William G. Bray	R	IN-07	January 3, 1951	2nd term	
292	Horace Seely-Brown Jr.	R	CT-02	January 3, 1951; Previous service, 1947–1949.	3rd term*	
293	Charles B. Brownson	R	IN-11	January 3, 1951	2nd term	
294	Hamer H. Budge	R	ID-02	January 3, 1951	2nd term	
295	Fred E. Busbey	R	IL-03	January 3, 1951; Previous service, 1943–1945 and 1947–1949.	4th term**	Left the House in 1955.
296	Alvin Bush	R	PA-17	January 3, 1951	2nd term	
297	John Chenoweth	R	CO-03	January 3, 1951; Previous service, 1941–1949.	6th term*	
298	Marguerite S. Church	R	IL-13	January 3, 1951	2nd term	
299	Shepard J. Crumpacker Jr.	R	IN-03	January 3, 1951	2nd term	
300	Thomas B. Curtis	R	MO-02	January 3, 1951	2nd term	
301	John J. Dempsey	D	NM	January 3, 1951; Previous service, 1935–1941.	5th term*	
302	James Devereux	R	MD-02	January 3, 1951	2nd term	
303	James G. Donovan	D	NY-18	January 3, 1951	2nd term	
304	William Jennings Bryan Dorn	D	SC-03	January 3, 1951; Previous service, 1947–1949.	3rd term*	
305	Sidney A. Fine	D	NY-22	January 3, 1951	2nd term	
306	Tic Forrester	D	GA-03	January 3, 1951	2nd term	
307	William H. Harrison	R	WY	January 3, 1951	2nd term	Left the House in 1955.
308	William E. Hess	R	OH-02	January 3, 1951; Previous service, 1929–1937 and 1939–1949.	11th term**	
309	Patrick J. Hillings	R	CA-25	January 3, 1951	2nd term	
310	Allan O. Hunter	R	CA-12	January 3, 1951	2nd term	Left the House in 1955.
311	John Jarman	D	OK-05	January 3, 1951	2nd term	
312	Charles J. Kersten	R	WI-05	January 3, 1951; Previous service, 1947–1949.	3rd term*	Left the House in 1955.
313	John C. Kluczynski	D	IL-05	January 3, 1951	2nd term	
314	William C. Lantaff	D	FL-04	January 3, 1951	2nd term	Left the House in 1955.
315	John Lesinski Jr.	D	MI-16	January 3, 1951	2nd term	
316	Thaddeus M. Machrowicz	D	MI-01	January 3, 1951	2nd term	
317	William E. McVey	R	IL-04	January 3, 1951	2nd term	
318	George Meader	R	MI-02	January 3, 1951	2nd term	
319	William E. Miller	R	NY-40	January 3, 1951	2nd term	
320	Albert P. Morano	R	CT-04	January 3, 1951	2nd term	
321	Walter M. Mumma	R	PA-16	January 3, 1951	2nd term	
322	Harold C. Ostertag	R	NY-39	January 3, 1951	2nd term	
323	Winston L. Prouty	R	VT	January 3, 1951	2nd term	
324	Edmund P. Radwan	R	NY-41	January 3, 1951	2nd term	
325	Frazier Reams	I	OH-09	January 3, 1951	2nd term	Left the House in 1955.
326	B. Carroll Reece	R	TN-01	January 3, 1951; Previous service, 1921–1931 and 1933–1947.	14th term**	
327	John J. Riley	D	SC-02	January 3, 1951; Previous service, 1945–1949.	4th term*	
328	Kenneth A. Roberts	D	AL-04	January 3, 1951	2nd term	
329	Byron G. Rogers	D	CO-01	January 3, 1951	2nd term	
330	Walter E. Rogers	D	TX-18	January 3, 1951	2nd term	
331	Timothy P. Sheehan	R	IL-11	January 3, 1951	2nd term	
332	Alfred Dennis Sieminski	D	NJ-13	January 3, 1951	2nd term	
333	Frank E. Smith	D	MS-03	January 3, 1951	2nd term	
334	William L. Springer	R	IL-22	January 3, 1951	2nd term	
335	Ruth Thompson	R	MI-09	January 3, 1951	2nd term	
336	William Van Pelt	R	WI-06	January 3, 1951	2nd term	
337	J. Ernest Wharton	R	NY-29	January 3, 1951	2nd term	
338	William R. Williams	R	NY-34	January 3, 1951	2nd term	
339	Sam Yorty	D	CA-26	January 3, 1951	2nd term	Left the House in 1955.
340	John C. Watts	D	KY-06	April 4, 1951	2nd term	
341	Elizabeth Kee	D	WV-05	July 17, 1951	2nd term	
342	Vera Buchanan	D	PA-30	July 24, 1951	2nd term	
343	Frank N. Ikard	D	TX-13	September 8, 1951	2nd term	
344	Clifford McIntire	R	ME-03	October 22, 1951	2nd term	
345	Joseph L. Carrigg	R	PA-10	November 6, 1951	2nd term	
346	Karl C. King	R	PA-08	November 6, 1951	2nd term	
347	Frank C. Osmers Jr.	R	NJ-09	November 6, 1951; Previous service, 1939–1943.	4th term*	
348	Paul F. Schenck	R	OH-03	November 6, 1951	2nd term	
349	Robert Dinsmore Harrison	R	NE-03	December 4, 1951	2nd term	
350	Leo W. O'Brien	D	NY-30	April 1, 1952	2nd term	
351	Garrett L. Withers	D	KY-02	August 2, 1952	2nd term	Died on April 30, 1953.
352	John Dowdy	D	TX-07	September 23, 1952	2nd term	
353	Hugh Quincy Alexander	D	NC-09	January 3, 1953	1st term	
354	Frank J. Becker	R	NY-03	January 3, 1953	1st term	
355	Alvin Morell Bentley	R	MI-08	January 3, 1953	1st term	
356	Edward Boland	D	MA-02	January 3, 1953	1st term	
357	Oliver P. Bolton	R	OH-11	January 3, 1953	1st term	
358	Edward J. Bonin	R	PA-11	January 3, 1953	1st term	Left the House in 1955.
359	Albert H. Bosch	R	NY-05	January 3, 1953	1st term	
360	Jack Brooks	D	TX-02	January 3, 1953	1st term	
361	Joel Broyhill	R	VA-10	January 3, 1953	1st term	
362	Robert Byrd	D	WV-06	January 3, 1953	1st term	
363	James A. Byrne	D	PA-03	January 3, 1953	1st term	
364	Courtney W. Campbell	D	FL-01	January 3, 1953	1st term	Left the House in 1955.
365	Elford Albin Cederberg	R	MI-10	January 3, 1953	1st term	
366	Kit Clardy	R	MI-06	January 3, 1953	1st term	Left the House in 1955.
367	William Clay Cole	R	MO-06	January 3, 1953; Previous service, 1943–1949.	4th term*	Left the House in 1955.
368	Robert Condon	D	CA-06	January 3, 1953	1st term	Left the House in 1955.
369	Sam Coon	R	OR-02	January 3, 1953	1st term	
370	Albert W. Cretella	R	CT-03	January 3, 1953	1st term	
371	Laurence Curtis	R	MA-10	January 3, 1953	1st term	
372	William A. Dawson	R	UT-02	January 3, 1953; Previous service, 1947–1949.	2nd term*	
373	Steven Derounian	R	NY-02	January 3, 1953	1st term	
374	Martin Dies Jr.	D	TX	January 3, 1953; Previous service, 1931–1945.	8th term*	
375	Thomas J. Dodd	D	CT-01	January 3, 1953	1st term	
376	Francis E. Dorn	R	NY-12	January 3, 1953	1st term	
377	Ed Edmondson	D	OK-02	January 3, 1953	1st term	
378	Paul A. Fino	R	NY-25	January 3, 1953	1st term	
379	Lawrence H. Fountain	D	NC-02	January 3, 1953	1st term	
380	Peter Frelinghuysen Jr.	R	NJ-05	January 3, 1953	1st term	
381	Samuel Friedel	D	MD-07	January 3, 1953	1st term	
382	Brady P. Gentry	D	TX-03	January 3, 1953	1st term	
383	Charles S. Gubser	R	CA-10	January 3, 1953	1st term	
384	Harlan Hagen	D	CA-14	January 3, 1953	1st term	
385	James A. Haley	D	FL-07	January 3, 1953	1st term	
386	Edgar W. Hiestand	R	CA-21	January 3, 1953	1st term	
387	Jeffrey Paul Hillelson	R	MO-04	January 3, 1953	1st term	Left the House in 1955.
388	Joseph F. Holt	R	CA-22	January 3, 1953	1st term	
389	Lester Holtzman	D	NY-06	January 3, 1953	1st term	
390	Craig Hosmer	R	CA-18	January 3, 1953	1st term	
391	Roman Hruska	R	NE-02	January 3, 1953	1st term	Resigned on November 8, 1954.
392	DeWitt Hyde	R	MD-06	January 3, 1953	1st term	
393	Charles R. Jonas	R	NC-10	January 3, 1953	1st term	
394	Victor A. Knox	R	MI-11	January 3, 1953	1st term	
395	Otto Krueger	R	ND	January 3, 1953	1st term	
396	Melvin Laird	R	WI-07	January 3, 1953	1st term	
397	Phil Landrum	D	GA-09	January 3, 1953	1st term	
398	George S. Long	D	LA-08	January 3, 1953	1st term	
399	Donald H. Magnuson	D	WA	January 3, 1953	1st term	
400	William S. Mailliard	R	CA-04	January 3, 1953	1st term	
401	Donald Ray Matthews	D	FL-08	January 3, 1953	1st term	
402	D. Bailey Merrill	R	IN-08	January 3, 1953	1st term	Left the House in 1955.
403	Lee Metcalf	D	MT-01	January 3, 1953	1st term	
404	Howard Shultz Miller	D	KS-01	January 3, 1953	1st term	Left the House in 1955.
405	Bob Mollohan	D	WV-01	January 3, 1953	1st term	
406	John E. Moss	D	CA-03	January 3, 1953	1st term	
407	Will E. Neal	R	WV-04	January 3, 1953	1st term	Left the House in 1955.
408	Charles G. Oakman	R	MI-17	January 3, 1953	1st term	Left the House in 1955.
409	Barratt O'Hara	D	IL-02	January 3, 1953; Previous service, 1949–1951.	2nd term*	
410	Tip O'Neill	D	MA-11	January 3, 1953	1st term	
411	Thomas Pelly	R	WA-01	January 3, 1953	1st term	
412	Gracie Pfost	D	ID-01	January 3, 1953	1st term	
413	John R. Pillion	R	NY-42	January 3, 1953	1st term	
414	Richard Harding Poff	R	VA-06	January 3, 1953	1st term	
415	John H. Ray	R	NY-15	January 3, 1953	1st term	
416	John J. Rhodes	R	AZ-01	January 3, 1953	1st term	
417	John M. Robsion Jr.	R	KY-03	January 3, 1953	1st term	
418	Gordon H. Scherer	R	OH-01	January 3, 1953	1st term	
419	Armistead Selden	D	AL-06	January 3, 1953	1st term	
420	George A. Shuford	D	NC-12	January 3, 1953	1st term	
421	Frank Small Jr.	R	MD-05	January 3, 1953	1st term	Left the House in 1955.
422	S. Walter Stauffer	R	PA-19	January 3, 1953	1st term	Left the House in 1955.
423	Douglas R. Stringfellow	R	UT-01	January 3, 1953	1st term	Left the House in 1955.
424	Leonor Sullivan	D	MO-03	January 3, 1953	1st term	
425	T. Ashton Thompson	D	LA-07	January 3, 1953	1st term	
426	James B. Utt	R	CA-28	January 3, 1953	1st term	
427	Stuyvesant Wainwright	R	NY-01	January 3, 1953	1st term	
428	William C. Wampler	R	VA-09	January 3, 1953	1st term	Left the House in 1955.
429	Herbert B. Warburton	R	DE	January 3, 1953	1st term	Left the House in 1955.
430	Jack Westland	R	WA-02	January 3, 1953	1st term	
431	Bob Wilson	R	CA-30	January 3, 1953	1st term	
432	Clarence Clifton Young	R	NV	January 3, 1953	1st term	
433	J. Arthur Younger	R	CA-09	January 3, 1953	1st term	
	J. L. Pilcher	D	GA-02	February 4, 1953	1st term	
	William M. Tuck	D	VA-05	April 14, 1953	1st term	
	Robert T. Ashmore	D	SC-04	June 2, 1953	1st term	
	James Bowler	D	IL-07	July 7, 1953	1st term	
	William Natcher	D	KY-02	August 1, 1953	1st term	
	Lester Johnson	D	WI-09	October 13, 1953	1st term	
	Harrison A. Williams	D	NJ-06	November 3, 1953	1st term	
	Glenard P. Lipscomb	R	CA-24	November 10, 1953	1st term	
	John James Flynt Jr.	D	GA-04	November 2, 1954	1st term	

== Delegates ==
Rank	Delegate	Party	District	Seniority date (Previous service, if any)	No.# of term(s)	Notes
1	Joseph Rider Farrington	R	HI	January 3, 1943	6th term	
2	Bob Bartlett	D	AK	January 3, 1945	5th term	
3	Antonio Fernós-Isern	D	PR	September 11, 1946	5th term	
	Mary Elizabeth Pruett Farrington	R	HI	August 4, 1954	1st term	

== See also ==
- 83rd United States Congress
- List of United States congressional districts
- List of United States senators in the 83rd Congress
