= J. Caleb Boggs =

American politician (1909–1993)

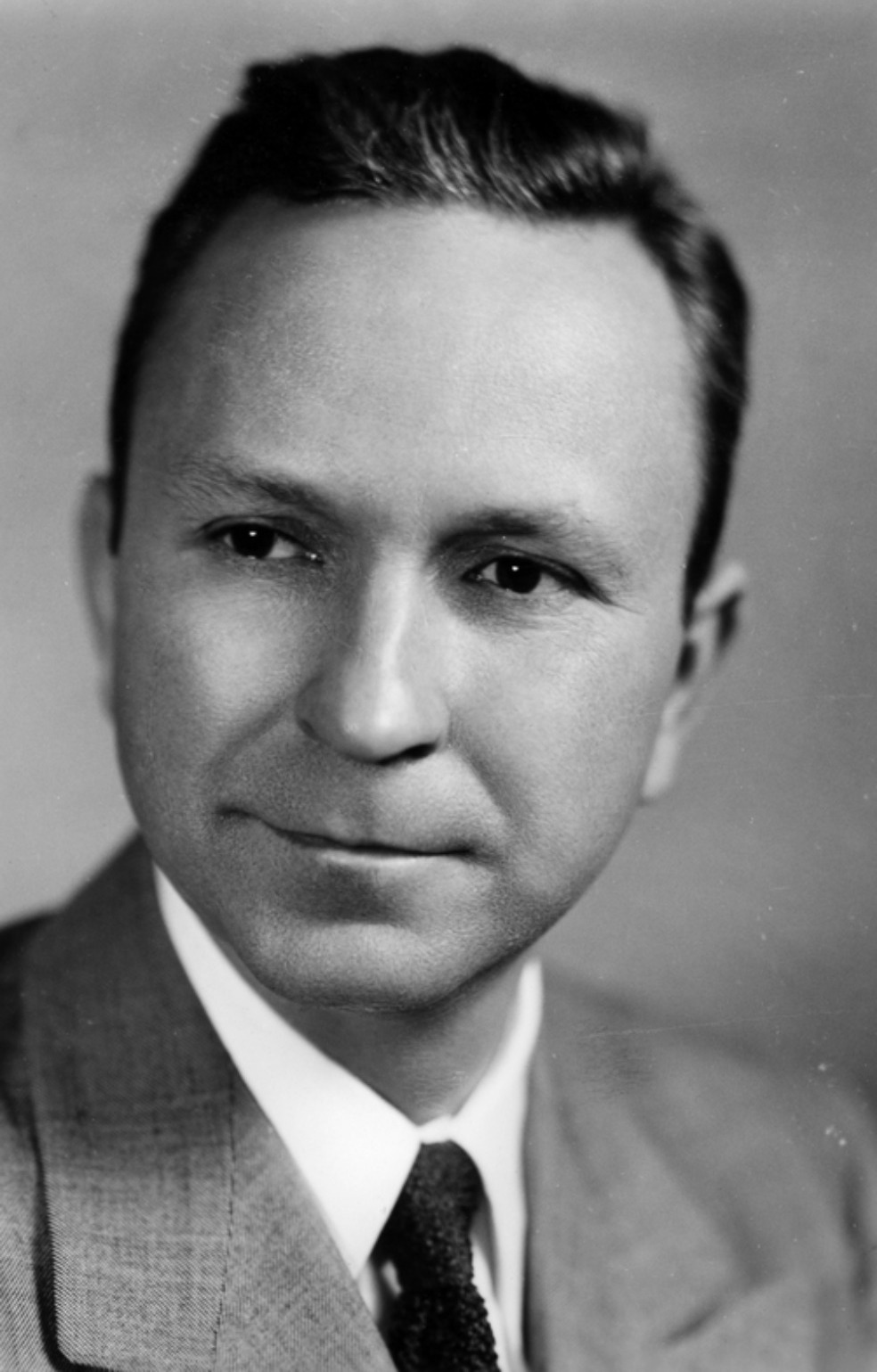
- Official portrait, 1947

United States Senator from Delaware
- In office January 3, 1961 – January 3, 1973
- Preceded by: J. Allen Frear Jr.
- Succeeded by: Joe Biden

Chair of the National Governors Association
- In office June 25, 1959 – June 26, 1960
- Preceded by: LeRoy Collins
- Succeeded by: Stephen McNichols

62nd Governor of Delaware
- In office January 20, 1953 – December 30, 1960
- Lieutenant: John W. Rollins; David P. Buckson
- Preceded by: Elbert N. Carvel
- Succeeded by: David P. Buckson

Member of the U.S. House of Representatives from Delaware's at-large district
- In office January 3, 1947 – January 3, 1953
- Preceded by: Philip A. Traynor
- Succeeded by: Herbert B. Warburton

Associate Judge of the New Castle County Family Court
- In office November 9, 1942 – January 3, 1947
- Preceded by: Billy Bickson
- Succeeded by: Johnathan Taylor

Personal details
- Born: James Caleb Boggs; May 15, 1909 Cheswold, Delaware, U.S.
- Died: March 26, 1993 (aged 83) Newark, Delaware, U.S.
- Resting place: Old Presbyterian Cemetery in Dover
- Party: Republican
- Spouse: Elizabeth Muir (m. 1931; died 1992)
- Children: 2
- Education: University of Delaware (BA); Georgetown University (LLB)

Military service
- Allegiance: United States
- Branch/service: United States Army
- Years of service: 1941–1946
- Rank: Colonel
- Unit: 6th Armored Division
- Battles/wars: World War II
- Awards: Campaign Stars (5); Legion of Merit; Bronze Star; Croix de Guerre

James Caleb Boggs (May 15, 1909 – March 26, 1993) was an American lawyer and politician from Claymont, Delaware. A Republican, he was commonly known by his middle name, Caleb, frequently shortened to Cale.

He was a veteran of World War II, and a member of the Republican Party, who served three terms as U.S. Representative from Delaware, two terms as Governor of Delaware, and two terms as U.S. Senator from Delaware. He lost re-election in 1972 to future 46th president of the United States Joe Biden.

== Early life and education ==
Boggs was born on May 15, 1909, at Cheswold, Delaware, the son of Edgar Jefferson and Lettie Vaughn Boggs. Boggs joined the Delaware National Guard in 1926 and became a reserve officer that year.

=== Family ===
In 1931, he married Elizabeth Muir; the couple had two children, and were members of the Methodist Church.

=== Education ===
He graduated from the University of Delaware in 1931 with an A.B. degree and later graduated from Georgetown Law School in 1937 with an LLB degree.

== Career ==
In 1938, he was admitted to the Delaware State Bar Association and began practicing law in Dover, Delaware.

During World War II, he served in the U.S. Army with the 6th Armored Division, fighting in Normandy, the Rhineland, the Ardennes, and central Europe. He earned five Campaign Stars, the Legion of Merit, the Bronze Star Medal with Oak Leaf Cluster, and the Croix de Guerre with palm from France.

=== U.S. House of Representatives ===
Boggs was appointed Associate Judge of the Family Court of New Castle County in 1946. He was elected to the U.S. House of Representatives in 1946, defeating incumbent Democratic U.S. Representative Philip A. Traynor. He was re-elected twice to the seat, defeating J. Carl McGuigan in 1948 and Henry M. Winchester in 1950. Boggs served in the U.S. House from January 3, 1947, to January 3, 1953.

=== Governor of Delaware ===
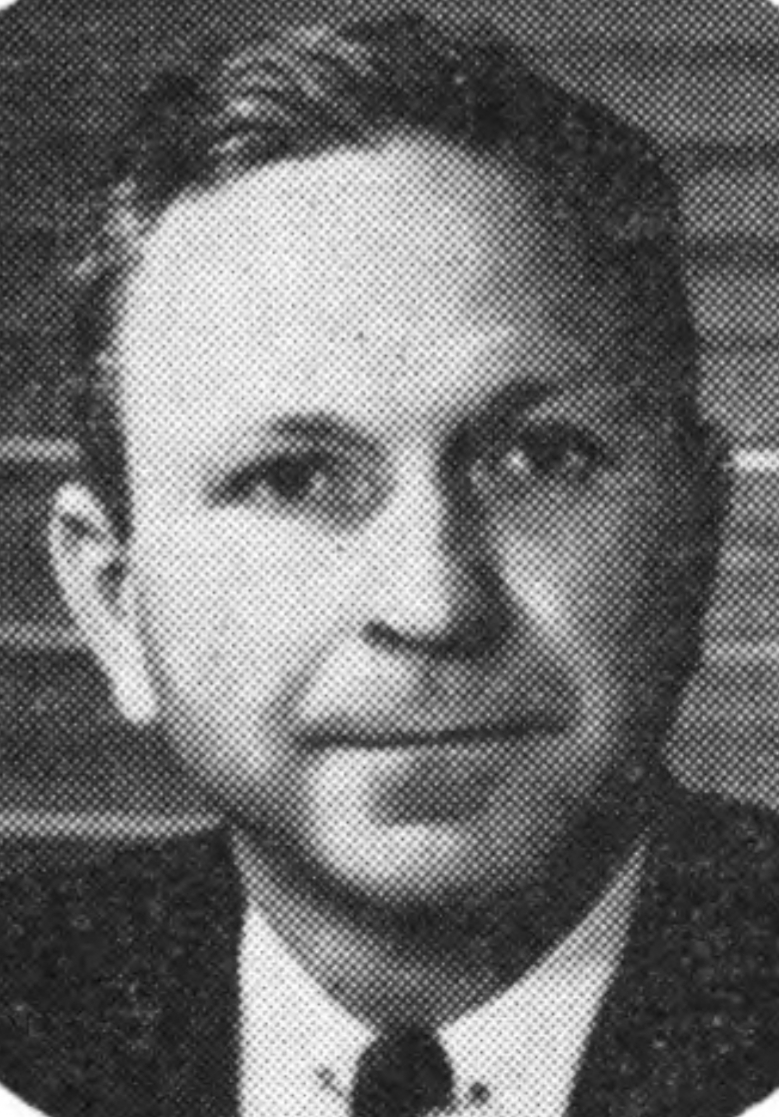
Boggs as governor

Boggs was elected Governor of Delaware in 1952, defeating incumbent Democratic Governor Elbert N. Carvel by 7,205 votes. He won a second term in 1956, defeating Democrat James Hoge Tyler McConnell by 6,918 votes. He served as governor from January 20, 1953, to December 30, 1960, when he resigned because of his upcoming U.S. Senate term. As governor, Boggs restructured governmental agencies and endorsed the merging of school districts and increasing teachers’ salaries. A prominent issue of his tenure was school desegregation; he was a proponent of the municipal home rule. On April 2, 1958, he signed the bill that ended capital punishment in Delaware.

=== United States Senator ===
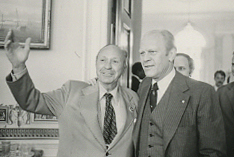
Boggs with President Gerald Ford

Boggs was elected to the U.S. Senate in 1960, narrowly defeating incumbent Democratic U.S. Senator J. Allen Frear Jr. by 2,784 votes, and becoming the only Republican to defeat an incumbent Democratic U.S. Senator that year. He won re-election in 1966, defeating Democrat James M. Tunnell Jr. by 30,005 votes — his widest margin of victory in any of his elections. He served from January 3, 1961, to January 3, 1973. Boggs voted in favor of the Civil Rights Acts of 1964 and 1968, as well as the 24th Amendment to the U.S. Constitution, the Voting Rights Act of 1965, and the confirmation of Thurgood Marshall to the U.S. Supreme Court.

Boggs lost his bid for a third term in 1972 to the future 47th Vice President and 46th President, Democrat Joe Biden, then a New Castle County councilman. Boggs was a reluctant candidate that year, being persuaded to run only to help avoid a divisive primary election. Biden waged an energetic campaign, questioning Boggs's age and ability, and went on to defeat Boggs by 3,162 votes. In his last years, Boggs lived in Wilmington, Delaware, where he continued to practice law until retiring in the early 1980s.

== Death and legacy ==
Boggs' health declined in his final years due to diabetes and cancer. His wife, Elizabeth, died on April 1, 1992, and he died just under a year later, on March 26, 1993, at Christiana Hospital in Newark, Delaware. He is buried in the Old Presbyterian Cemetery in Dover, on the grounds of the Delaware State Museum.

The J. Caleb Boggs Federal Building at 844 King Street in Wilmington, Delaware is named for him.

== List of General Assembly sessions ==
Delaware General Assembly (sessions while Governor)
Year	Assembly	Senate Majority	President pro tempore	House Majority	Speaker
1953–1954	117th	Republican	Thomas L. Johnson	Republican	Frank A. Jones
1955–1956	118th	Democratic	Charles G. Moore	Democratic	James R. Quigley
1957–1958	119th	Democratic	Lemuel Hickman	Democratic	Harry E. Mayhew
1959–1960	120th	Democratic	Allen J. Cook	Democratic	Sherman W. Tribbitt

== Elections ==
Election results
Year	Office	Subject	Party	Votes	%	Opponent	Party	Votes	%
1946	U.S. Representative	J. Caleb Boggs	Republican	63,516	56%	Philip A. Traynor	Democratic	49,105	44%
1948	U.S. Representative	J. Caleb Boggs	Republican	71,127	51%	J. Carl McGuigan	Democratic	68,909	49%
1950	U.S. Representative	J. Caleb Boggs	Republican	73,313	57%	Henry M. Winchester	Democratic	56,091	43%
1952	Governor	J. Caleb Boggs	Republican	88,977	52%	Elbert N. Carvel	Democratic	81,772	48%
1956	Governor	J. Caleb Boggs	Republican	91,965	52%	J. H. Tyler McConnell	Democratic	85,047	48%
1960	U.S. Senator	J. Caleb Boggs	Republican	98,874	51%	J. Allen Frear, Jr.	Democratic	96,090	49%
1966	U.S. Senator	J. Caleb Boggs	Republican	97,268	59%	James M. Tunnell, Jr.	Democratic	67,263	41%
1972	U.S. Senator	J. Caleb Boggs	Republican	112,844	49%	Joe Biden	Democratic	116,006	50%

== Bibliography ==
- Davis, Ned (2000). Charles L. Terry. Wilmington, Delaware: Delaware Heritage Press. LCCN 00133337. OCLC 47186751.
- Hoffecker, Carol E. (2000). Honest John Williams. Newark, Delaware: University of Delaware Press.
- Hoffecker, Carol E. (2004). Democracy in Delaware. Wilmington, Delaware: Cedar Tree Books. ISBN 1-892142-23-6.
- Martin, Roger A. (1984). History of Delaware Through its Governors. Wilmington, Delaware: McClafferty Press.
- Martin, Roger (1997). Elbert N. Carvel. Wilmington, Delaware: Delaware Heritage Press. ISBN 0-924117-08-7.
- Munroe, John A. (1993). History of Delaware. Newark, Delaware: University of Delaware Press. ISBN 0-87413-493-5.

== Images ==
- Hall of Governors Portrait Gallery; Portrait courtesy of Historical and Cultural Affairs, Dover.

U.S. House of Representatives
Preceded by Philip A. Traynor	Member of the U.S. House of Representatives from Delaware's at-large congressional district 1947–1953	Succeeded by Herbert B. Warburton
Party political offices
Preceded by Hyland George	Republican nominee for Governor of Delaware; 1952, 1956	Succeeded by John W. Rollins
Preceded by Herbert B. Warburton	Republican nominee for U.S. Senator from Delaware (Class 2); 1960, 1966, 1972	Succeeded by James H. Baxter Jr.
Political offices
Preceded by Elbert N. Carvel	Governor of Delaware; 1953–1960	Succeeded by David P. Buckson
Preceded by LeRoy Collins	Chair of the National Governors Association; 1959–1960	Succeeded by Stephen McNichols
U.S. Senate
Preceded by J. Allen Frear Jr.	U.S. Senator (Class 2) from Delaware; 1961–1973; Served alongside: John Williams, William Roth	Succeeded by Joe Biden
