= 1954 United States Senate election in Delaware =

- November 2, 1954
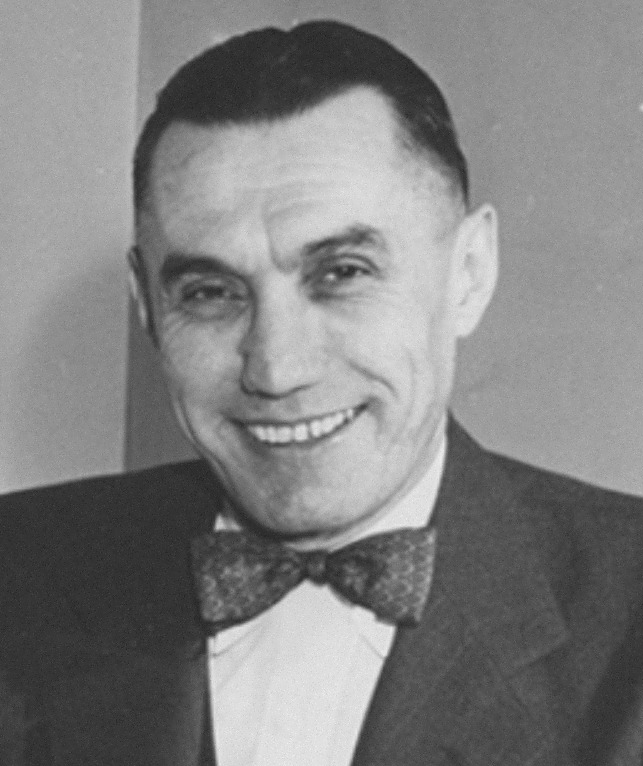

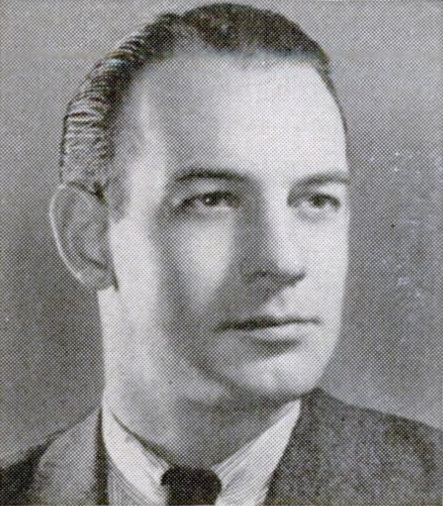
Nominee	J. Allen Frear Jr.	Herbert B. Warburton
Party	Democratic	Republican
Popular vote	82,511	62,389
Percentage	56.94%	43.06%
- County results Frear: 50–60% 60–70%
U.S. senator before election
J. Allen Frear Jr.
Democratic
Elected U.S. Senator
J. Allen Frear Jr.
Democratic

The 1954 United States Senate election in Delaware took place on November 2, 1954. Incumbent Democratic Senator J. Allen Frear Jr. won re-election to a second term.

== Nominations ==
Nominations were made by party conventions.

=== Democratic nomination ===
The Democratic convention was held on August 10, 1954, at Dover.

==== Candidates ====
- James M. Tunnell Jr., former justice of the Delaware Supreme Court
- J. Allen Frear Jr., incumbent U.S. Senator

==== Results ====
Democratic convention results
Party	Candidate	Votes	%
Democratic	J. Allen Frear Jr.	125¼	
Democratic	James M. Tunnell Jr.	84¾	
Total votes		210	

=== Republican nomination ===
The Republican convention was held on August 18, 1954, at the Capitol Theater, Dover.

==== Candidates ====
- Herbert Warburton, incumbent U.S. Representative, unanimously

==== Not placed in nomination ====
- Mrs. Vera G. Davis, former majority leader in the Delaware House of Representatives

== General election ==
=== Results ===
1954 United States Senate election in Delaware
Party	Candidate	Votes	%
Democratic	J. Allen Frear Jr. (Incumbent)	82,511	56.94
Republican	Herbert Warburton	62,389	43.06
Majority		20,122	13.88
Turnout		144,900	
Democratic hold			

== See also ==
- 1954 United States Senate elections
