= J83 =

J83 may refer to:

- Fairchild J83, a tubojet
- HMS Gleaner (J83), a minesweeper
- LNER Class J83, a tank locomotive
- Tridiminished rhombicosidodecahedron, a Johnson solid

== See also ==
- Shenyang J-8 III "Finback", a Chinese jet fighter plane, a variant of the MiG-21
- 83 (disambiguation)
- J (disambiguation)
