= James Tunnell =

James Tunnell may refer to:

- James M. Tunnell, American lawyer and politician
- James M. Tunnell Jr., his son, American judge and politician
- Jimi Tunnell, American guitarist and vocalist
