= Philip A. Traynor =

American politician

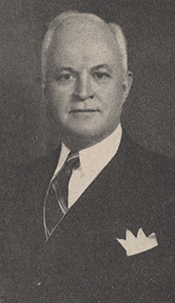

Member of the U.S. House of Representatives from Delaware's at-large district
- In office January 3, 1945 – January 3, 1947
- Preceded by: Earle D. Willey
- Succeeded by: J. Caleb Boggs
- In office January 3, 1941 – January 3, 1943
- Preceded by: George S. Williams
- Succeeded by: Earle D. Willey

Personal details
- Born: May 31, 1874 Wilmington, Delaware, US
- Died: December 5, 1962 (aged 88) Wilmington, Delaware, US
- Party: Democratic
- Education: University of Delaware
- Profession: Dentist

Philip Andrew Traynor (May 31, 1874 – December 5, 1962) was an American dentist and politician from Wilmington, in New Castle County, Delaware. He was a member of the Democratic Party and served two terms as U.S. Representative from Delaware.

== Early life and family ==
Traynor was born in Wilmington, Delaware. He attended the public schools, Goldey Business College, in Wilmington, and the University of Delaware at Newark. He graduated in 1895 from the dental department of the University of Pennsylvania at Philadelphia, and began the practice of dentistry in Wilmington.

== Professional and political career ==
Traynor was a member of the Delaware board of dentistry from 1918 until 1943, serving as its chairman after 1922. He was also vice president and member of the board of trustees of Ferris Industrial School for Boys from 1938 until 1942. He was elected to the U.S. House of Representatives in 1940, defeating incumbent Republican U.S. Representative George S. Williams. He lost his bid for a second term in 1942 to Republican, Earle D. Willey, but in a 1944 rematch defeated Willey, and returned to the U.S. House. Finally, he lost his bid for a third term to Republican J. Caleb Boggs, a New Castle County lawyer, and war veteran. Traynor served in the Democratic majority in the 77th and 79th Congress. He was in office from January 3, 1941, until January 3, 1943, and again from January 3, 1945, until January 3, 1947, during the administrations of U.S. presidents Franklin D. Roosevelt and Harry S. Truman.

== Death and legacy ==
Traynor died at Wilmington, and is buried in the Cathedral Cemetery there.

== Almanac ==
Elections are held the first Tuesday after November 1. U.S. Representatives take office January 3 and have a two-year term.

Public Offices
Office	Type	Location	Began office	Ended office	notes
U.S. Representative	Legislature	Washington	January 3, 1941	January 3, 1943	
U.S. Representative	Legislature	Washington	January 3, 1945	January 3, 1947	

United States Congressional service
Dates	Congress	Chamber	Majority	President	Committees	Class/District
1941–1943	77th	U.S. House	Democratic	Franklin D. Roosevelt		at-large
1945–1947	79th	U.S. House	Democratic	Harry S. Truman		at-large

Election results
Year	Office	Subject	Party	Votes	%	Opponent	Party	Votes	%
1940	U.S. Representative	Philip A. Traynor	Democratic	68,205	51%	George S. Williams	Republican	64,384	48%
1942	U.S. Representative	Philip A. Traynor	Democratic	38,791	46%	Earle D. Willey	Republican	45,376	54%
1944	U.S. Representative	Philip A. Traynor	Democratic	63,649	50%	Earle D. Willey	Republican	62,378	49%
1946	U.S. Representative	Philip A. Traynor	Democratic	49,105	44%	J. Caleb Boggs	Republican	63,516	56%

== Places with more information ==
- Delaware Historical Society; website; 505 North Market Street, Wilmington, Delaware 19801; (302) 655-7161.
- University of Delaware; Library website; 181 South College Avenue, Newark, Delaware 19717; (302) 831-2965.
- Newark Free Library 750 Library Ave., Newark, Delaware (302) 731-7550.

U.S. House of Representatives
Preceded by George S. Williams	Member of the U.S. House of Representatives from Delaware's at-large congressional district 1941–1943	Succeeded by Earle D. Willey
Preceded by Earle D. Willey	Member of the U.S. House of Representatives from Delaware's at-large congressional district 1945–1947	Succeeded by J. Caleb Boggs
