= William F. Allen (Delaware politician) =

American businessman and politician

Member of the U.S. House of Representatives from Delaware's at-large district
- In office January 3, 1937 – January 3, 1939
- Preceded by: J. George Stewart
- Succeeded by: George S. Williams

Member of the Delaware Senate
- In office 1925-1929

Personal details
- Born: William Franklin Allen; January 19, 1883 Seaford, Delaware, U.S.
- Died: June 14, 1946 (aged 63) Lewes, Delaware, U.S.
- Resting place: Odd Fellows Cemetery in Seaford, Delaware
- Party: Democratic
- Spouse: Mary Addie Davis
- Occupation: Businessman

William Franklin "Love Bird Bill" Allen (January 19, 1883 – June 14, 1946) was an American businessman and politician. He was a Democratic member of the Delaware General Assembly and the United States House of Representatives.

== Early life and family ==
Allen was born in Seaford, Delaware, son of Willard Franklin ("Frank") Allen and Mollie (Smith) Allen. His father was a foreman on the Pennsylvania Railroad for 40 years, retiring in 1921. Frank's oldest brother, William Asbury Allen, served in the Confederate army, 1861-1863.

Allen married Mary Addie Davis on April 16, 1906, in Marydel, Maryland. Her father, Robert A. Davis, owned several stores and was postmaster of the now-defunct town of Slaughter (near Hartly) in Kent County, Delaware. He served one term as a Republican (1888) in the General Assembly. Allen and his wife had three children; Franklyn, Robert, and Doris. They belonged to St. John's Methodist Episcopal Church in Seaford.

While in high school Allen began working for the Pennsylvania Railroad as a carpenter, and later advanced to become a ticket agent, telegrapher, and train dispatcher. From ca. 1905 until 1909 he was the station master at Marydel, Maryland. While living there, Allen launched his first business venture in 1905 when he and seven investors started the Marydel and Templeville Telephone Company. The next year he purchased his father-in-law's general merchandise store in Marydel which was thereafter operated by W. F. Allen & Co. He returned to Seaford in 1909 and after a few years quit the railroad to focus on his real estate brokerage business, which specialized in farmland. In 1914 he further diversified by starting the Allen Package Company, which employed about 50 men to make shipping containers for fruit, vegetables, and oysters. Two years later he added a canning factory in Blades to his growing portfolio. He formed a brokerage firm to buy fruit and vegetable produce throughout the Delmarva Peninsula. His office in Cape Charles, Virginia, reportedly shipped 1,500 carloads of potatoes each year. In 1927 he was granted a lucrative franchise by the Pure Oil Company of New York for the Delmarva Peninsula. In a biographical sketch published in 1929 Allen was said to be "one of Delaware's most interesting businessmen." He was "a self-made man and during his long business career has found it desirable to turn his hand to various occupations always with success, which has led to business expansion and work of a higher and more responsible plane."

In 1915 Allen's business and financial success led him to purchase one of Seaford's most distinguished residences. Located on High Street, the large frame house had been constructed in 1886 by Willie M. Ross, a son of Governor William H. Ross, the owner of a successful fertalizer business, a one-term state senator (1890-1894), and a Delaware state treasurer (1896-1898). Allen paid $5,250 for the house that Ross reportedly had spent $17,000 to build. After ten years, Allen removed the Queen Anne style porches and replaced them with imposing "colonial" porches with Ionic columns. The alterations were begun in April 1925 and were completed five months later.

== Political career ==
In 1914, during his first political campaign, Allen sought his party's nomination for representative to the General Assembly; he lost the primary by 54 votes. Two years later he was elected to the Seaford Board of Education and served as its vice president. That same year (1916) he ran for a seat in the state senate, but lost to Edward M. Brown by one vote. In 1920 he was a delegate to the Democratic National Convention in San Francisco.

Allen's third bid for statewide office proved successful: he was elected to the Delaware state senate in 1924. He served from 1925 to 1929, and was elected President pro tempore in 1927

A strong supporter of U.S. President Franklin D. Roosevelt and the New Deal, Allen sought his party's nomination for U. S. Senate in 1936. When his vigorous efforts failed at the state convention, the party nominated him instead for the state's lone seat in the U. S. House of Representatives. He was elected to Congress in 1936, defeating incumbent Republican U.S. Representative J. George Stewart. Allen lost his bid for a second term in 1938 to Republican George S. Williams, a businessman from Millsboro, Delaware. During his term, Allen was a member of the Democratic majority in the 75th Congress and served from January 3, 1937, until January 3, 1939, during the second administration of President Roosevelt.

While a member of Congress Allen supported efforts to construct a bridge over the Delaware River just below Wilmington. This project was opposed by Philadelphia shipping interests, which warned such a structure would restrict the size of ships entering the port of Philadelphia. In a committee hearing, Allen claimed he would do nothing to harm Philadelphia, that he loved Philadelphia, and that his wife did her shopping there—and he loved his wife. Yet, despite his love for Philadelphia he loved little Delaware more and this bridge was vital to its economic interests. According to family tradition, it was because Allen repeated the word "love" so often that he earned the nickname "Love Bird Bill." Pundits and cartoonists happily latched onto Allen's catchy new nickname. (See Gee Tee Maxwell's editorial cartoon, "About Time for Something to Hatch," Evening Journal (Wilmington, DE), August 2, 1938.)

At the end on his single term in the House, Allen resumed full-time work in his various businesses. In 1940, however, he again tried to secure the Democratic nomination for U. S. Senate. When that effort failed, he hastily formed a third party, the so-called "Liberal Democratic Party," on which to run. In that election Allen received only 2,547 votes, not enough to affect the outcome. This was his final run for public office.

== Death ==
Allen died at Beebe Hospital in Lewes and is interred at the Odd Fellows Cemetery in Seaford, Delaware.

== Electoral history ==
1936 United States House of Representatives election in Delaware
Party	Candidate	Votes	%
Democratic	William F. Allen	65,485	52%
Republican	J. George Stewart (incumbent)	55,664	44%
Republican	James A. Ellison	5,338	4%
Socialist	William A. Mayor	176	0.01%
Total votes		126,663	100%
Turnout			
Democratic gain from Republican			

1938 United States House of Representatives election in Delaware
Party	Candidate	Votes	%
Republican	George S. Williams	60,661	56%
Democratic	William F. Allen (incumbent)	46,989	43%
Republican	William J. Highfield	816	0.07%
Progressive Party (US, 1924)	Ralph L. Brown	105	0.01%
Total votes		108,571	100%
Turnout			
Republican gain from Democratic			

== Places with more information ==
- Delaware Historical Society; website; 505 North Market Street, Wilmington, Delaware 19801; (302) 655-7161.
- University of Delaware; Library website; 181 South College Avenue, Newark, Delaware 19717; (302) 831-2965.

U.S. House of Representatives
Preceded by J. George Stewart	Member of the U.S. House of Representatives from Delaware's at-large congressional district 1937–1939	Succeeded by George S. Williams
