= 83rd Brigade =

83rd Brigade may refer to:

== Armenia ==
- 83rd Motorized Rifle Brigade

== Russia ==
- 83rd Guards Air Assault Brigade

== Soviet Union ==
- 83rd Anti-Aircraft Rocket Brigade
- 83rd Aviation Brigade

== Spain ==
- 83rd Mixed Brigade

== United Kingdom ==
- 83rd Brigade (United Kingdom)
- 83rd Brigade, Royal Field Artillery, a British Army unit in World War I
- 83rd (Welsh) Brigade, Royal Field Artillery, a British Army unit after World War I

== See also ==
- 83rd Division (disambiguation)
- 83rd Regiment (disambiguation)
