= George S. Williams =

American politician (1877–1961)

Member of the U.S. House of Representatives from Delaware's at-large district
- In office January 3, 1939 – January 3, 1941
- Preceded by: William F. Allen
- Succeeded by: Philip A. Traynor

Treasurer of Delaware
- In office January 15, 1929 – January 15, 1933
- Governor: C. Douglass Buck

Mayor of Millsboro
- In office 1921–1927

Personal details
- Born: George Short Williams; October 21, 1877 Ocean View, Delaware, U.S.
- Died: November 22, 1961 (aged 84) Millsboro, Delaware, U.S.
- Resting place: Union Cemetery at Georgetown, Delaware
- Party: Republican
- Education: Dickinson College
- Occupation: Manager

George Short Williams (October 21, 1877 – November 22, 1961) was an American office administrator and politician from Millsboro in Sussex County, Delaware. A member of the Republican Party, Williams served one term as U.S. Representative from Delaware from 1939 to 1941. He previously served as Treasurer of Delaware.

== Early life and family ==
Williams was born in Ocean View, Delaware. He attended the public schools and Wilmington Conference Academy, in Dover, Delaware, and graduated from Dickinson College, in Carlisle, Pennsylvania, in 1900. He married Helen Mary Heinzer and they had three children together.

== Professional and political career ==
Williams was a high school instructor in Ironwood, Michigan, from 1902 until 1904. He then became engaged in the lumber business in Delaware and North Carolina from 1905 until 1923. He was also interested in banking. Williams was Mayor of Millsboro, Delaware, from 1921 until 1927, Treasurer of the State of Delaware from 1929 until 1933, President of the State Board of Education from 1927 until 1934, and deputy Motor Vehicle Commissioner from 1935 until 1937. In 1940 he was a delegate to the Republican National Convention.

=== Congress ===
Williams was elected to the U.S. House of Representatives in 1938, defeating incumbent Democrat U.S. Representative William F. Allen. He served in the Republican minority in the 76th Congress from January 3, 1939, until January 3, 1941, during the second administration of U.S. President Franklin D. Roosevelt, but lost his bid for a second term in 1940 to Democrat Philip A. Traynor.

=== Later career ===
Subsequently, he was the Delaware Motor Vehicle Commissioner from 1941 until 1946 and then was an administrative aide to U.S. Senator John J. Williams from 1947 until 1959.

== Death ==
Williams died at Millsboro, Delaware. He is buried in the Union Cemetery at Georgetown, Delaware, located at South Race Street.

== Electoral history ==
Elections are held the first Tuesday after November 1. The State Treasurer takes office the third Tuesday of January for a two-year term. U.S. Representatives take office January 3 and also have a two-year term.

Public offices
Office	Type	Location	Began office	Ended office	Notes
Mayor	Executive	Millsboro	1921	1923	
Mayor	Executive	Millsboro	1923	1925	
Mayor	Executive	Millsboro	1925	1927	
State Treasurer	Executive	Dover	January 15, 1929	January 15, 1931	
State Treasurer	Executive	Dover	January 15, 1931	January 15, 1933	
U.S. Representative	Legislature	Washington	January 3, 1939	January 3, 1941	

1938 United States House of Representatives election in Delaware
Party	Candidate	Votes	%
Republican	George S. Williams	60,661	56%
Democratic	William F. Allen (incumbent)	46,989	43%
Republican	William J. Highfield	816	0.07%
Progressive Party (United States, 1924–1934)	Ralph L. Brown	105	0.01%
Total votes		108,571	100%
Republican gain from Democratic			

1940 United States House of Representatives election in Delaware
Party	Candidate	Votes	%
Democratic	Philip A. Traynor	68,205	51%
Republican	George S. Williams (incumbent)	64,384	48%
Independent	Royden C. Caulk	816	0.06%
Total votes		133,405	100%
Democratic gain from Republican			

U.S. House of Representatives
Preceded by William F. Allen	Member of the U.S. House of Representatives from Delaware's at-large congressional district 1939–1941	Succeeded by Philip A. Traynor
