= List of United States senators in the 83rd Congress =

This is a complete list of United States senators during the 83rd United States Congress listed by seniority from January 3, 1953, to January 3, 1955.

Order of service is based on the commencement of the senator's first term. Behind this is former service as a senator (only giving the senator seniority within their new incoming class), service as vice president, a House member, a cabinet secretary, or a governor of a state. The final factor is the population of the senator's state.

Senators who were sworn in during the middle of the two-year congressional term (up until the last senator who was not sworn in early after winning the November 1954 election) are listed at the end of the list with no number.

In this Congress, Richard Russell Jr. was the most senior junior senator. Four senators held the distinction of being the most junior senior senator throughout this Congress: first, Prescott Bush from the start of the Congress until Clyde Hoey's death in May 1954; then Alton Lennon until July 1, 1954, until the death of Hugh Butler; then Eva Bowring until she vacated office on November 8, 1954; and finally Roman Hruska from his swearing in that day through the remainder of this Congress.

== Terms of service ==
Class	Terms of service of senators that expired in years
Class 2	Terms of service of senators that expired in 1955 (AL, AR, CO, DE, GA, IA, ID, IL, KS, KY, LA, MA, ME, MI, MN, MS, MT, NC, NE, NH, NJ, NM, OK, OR, RI, SC, SD, TN, TX, VA, WV, and WY.)
Class 3	Terms of service of senators that expired in 1957 (AL, AR, AZ, CA, CO, CT, FL, GA, ID, IL, IN, IA, KS, KY, LA, MD, MO, NC, ND, NH, NV, NY, OH, OK, OR, PA, SC, SD, UT, VT, WA, and WI.)
Class 1	Terms of service of senators that expired in 1959 (AZ, CA, CT, DE, FL, IN, MA, MD, ME, MI, MN, MO, MS, MT, ND, NE, NJ, NM, NV, NY, OH, PA, RI, TN, TX, UT, VA, VT, WA, WI, WV, and WY.)

== U.S. Senate seniority list ==
U.S. Senate seniority
Rank	Senator (party-state)	Seniority date	Other factors
1	Walter F. George (D-GA)	November 22, 1922	
2	Carl Hayden (D-AZ)	March 4, 1927	
3	Richard Russell, Jr. (D-GA)	January 12, 1933	
4	Harry F. Byrd, Sr. (D-VA)	March 4, 1933	Former governor
5	Pat McCarran (D-NV)	March 4, 1933	
6	James Murray (D-MT)	November 7, 1934	
7	Dennis Chavez (D-NM)	May 11, 1935	
8	Edwin C. Johnson (D-CO)	January 3, 1937	Former governor, Colorado 33rd in population (1930)
9	Theodore F. Green (D-RI)	January 3, 1937	Former governor, Rhode Island 37th in population (1930)
10	Styles Bridges (R-NH)	January 3, 1937	Former governor, New Hampshire 41st in population (1930)
11	Allen J. Ellender (D-LA)	January 3, 1937	
12	Joseph L. Hill (D-AL)	January 11, 1938	
13	Charles W. Tobey (R-NH)	January 3, 1939	Former representative
14	Robert A. Taft (R-OH)	January 3, 1939	Ohio 4th in population (1930)
15	Alexander Wiley (R-WI)	January 3, 1939	Wisconsin 13th in population (1930)
16	William Langer (R-ND)	January 3, 1941	Former governor
17	Harley M. Kilgore (D-WV)	January 3, 1941	West Virginia 27th in population (1930)
18	Hugh A. Butler (R-NE)	January 3, 1941	Nebraska 32nd in population (1930)
19	George Aiken (R-VT)	January 10, 1941	
20	Burnet R. Maybank (D-SC)	November 5, 1941	
21	Eugene D. Millikin (R-CO)	December 20, 1941	
22	James Eastland (D-MS)	January 3, 1943	Previously a senator
23	John Little McClellan (D-AR)	January 3, 1943	Former representative
24	Homer S. Ferguson (R-MI)	January 3, 1943	
25	Guy Cordon (R-OR)	March 4, 1944	
26	Howard A. Smith (R-NJ)	December 7, 1944	
27	Warren G. Magnuson (D-WA)	December 14, 1944	
28	J. William Fulbright (D-AR)	January 3, 1945	Former representative (2 years)
29	Clyde R. Hoey (D-NC)	January 3, 1945	Former representative (1 year, 2 months)
30	Bourke B. Hickenlooper (R-IA)	January 3, 1945	Former governor, Iowa 20th in population (1940)
31	Olin D. Johnston (D-SC)	January 3, 1945	Former governor, South Carolina 26th in population (1940)
32	Homer E. Capehart (R-IN)	January 3, 1945	Indiana 12th in population (1940)
33	Wayne Morse (I/D-OR)	January 3, 1945	Oregon 34th in population (1940)
34	Leverett Saltonstall (R-MA)	January 4, 1945	
35	Milton Young (R-ND)	March 12, 1945	
36	William F. Knowland (R-CA)	August 26, 1945	
37	Spessard Holland (D-FL)	September 24, 1946	
38	Ralph Flanders (R-VT)	November 1, 1946	
39	A. Willis Robertson (D-VA)	November 6, 1946	Former representative (13 years, 10 months)
40	John Sparkman (D-AL)	November 6, 1946	Former representative (9 years, 10 months)
41	William E. Jenner (R-IN)	January 3, 1947	Previously a senator
42	Edward Martin (R-PA)	January 3, 1947	Former governor, Pennsylvania 2nd in population (1940)
43	John W. Bricker (R-OH)	January 3, 1947	Former governor, Ohio 4th in population (1940)
44	Edward John Thye (R-MN)	January 3, 1947	Former governor, Minnesota 18th in population (1940)
45	Irving Ives (R-NY)	January 3, 1947	New York 1st in population (1940)
46	Joseph McCarthy (R-WI)	January 3, 1947	Wisconsin 13th in population (1940)
47	Arthur Vivian Watkins (R-UT)	January 3, 1947	Utah 40th in population (1940)
48	John J. Williams (R-DE)	January 3, 1947	Delaware 47th in population (1940)
49	George W. Malone (R-NV)	January 3, 1947	Nevada 48th in population (1940)
50	John C. Stennis (D-MS)	November 17, 1947	
51	Karl Mundt (R-SD)	December 31, 1948	Former representative
52	Russell B. Long (D-LA)	December 31, 1948	
53	Matthew M. Neely (D-WV)	January 3, 1949	Previously a senator (twice) (total tenure 15 years, 10 months)
54	Guy Mark Gillette (D-IA)	January 3, 1949	Previously a senator (8 years, 2 months)
55	Lyndon Johnson (D-TX)	January 3, 1949	Former representative (12 years)
56	Estes Kefauver (D-TN)	January 3, 1949	Former representative (10 years)
57	Margaret Chase Smith (R-ME)	January 3, 1949	Former representative (8 years, 7 months)
58	Clinton Anderson (D-NM)	January 3, 1949	Former representative (4 years, 5 months)
59	Robert S. Kerr (D-OK)	January 3, 1949	Former governor, Oklahoma 22nd in population (1940)
60	Andrew F. Schoeppel (R-KS)	January 3, 1949	Former governor, Kansas 29th in population (1940)
61	Lester C. Hunt (D-WY)	January 3, 1949	Former governor, Wyoming 46th in population (1940)
62	Paul Douglas (D-IL)	January 3, 1949	Illinois 3rd in population (1940)
63	Robert C. Hendrickson (R-NJ)	January 3, 1949	New Jersey 9th in population (1940)
64	Hubert Humphrey (D-MN)	January 3, 1949	Minnesota 18th in population (1940)
65	Joseph Frear, Jr. (D-DE)	January 3, 1949	Delaware 47th in population (1940)
66	Henry Dworshak (R-ID)	October 14, 1949	
67	Herbert H. Lehman (D-NY)	November 9, 1949	
68	Frank Carlson (R-KS)	November 27, 1950	Former representative (12 years)
69	Earle C. Clements (D-KY)	November 27, 1950	Former representative (3 years)
70	Willis Smith (D-NC)	November 27, 1950	
71	John O. Pastore (D-RI)	December 19, 1950	
72	Everett Dirksen (R-IL)	January 3, 1951	Former representative (16 years)
73	Francis H. Case (R-SD)	January 3, 1951	Former representative (14 years)
74	Almer Monroney (D-OK)	January 3, 1951	Former representative (12 years)
75	Thomas C. Hennings, Jr. (D-MO)	January 3, 1951	Former representative (6 years)
76	George Smathers (D-FL)	January 3, 1951	Former representative (4 years)
77	John M. Butler (R-MD)	January 3, 1951	Maryland 28th in population (1940)
78	Wallace F. Bennett (R-UT)	January 3, 1951	Utah 40th in population (1940)
79	Herman Welker (R-ID)	January 3, 1951	Idaho 43rd in population (1940)
80	James H. Duff (R-PA)	January 16, 1951	
81	John Sherman Cooper (R-KY)	November 5, 1952	Previously a senator
82	Charles E. Potter (R-MI)	November 5, 1952	Former representative
83	Dwight Griswold (R-NE)	November 5, 1952	Former governor
84	Prescott Bush (R-CT)	November 5, 1952	
85	Thomas Kuchel (R-CA)	January 2, 1953	
86	William A. Purtell (R-CT)	January 3, 1953	Previously a senator
87	Albert Gore, Sr. (D-TN)	January 3, 1953	Former representative (14 years)
88	Henry M. Jackson (D-WA)	January 3, 1953	Former representative (12 years)
89	James Glenn Beall (R-MD)	January 3, 1953	Former representative (10 years), Maryland 24th in population (1950)
90	Mike Mansfield (D-MT)	January 3, 1953	Former representative (10 years), Montana 42nd in population (1950)
91	John F. Kennedy (D-MA)	January 3, 1953	Former representative (6 years)
92	Frederick G. Payne (R-ME)	January 3, 1953	Former governor, Maine 35th in population (1950)
93	Frank A. Barrett (R-WY)	January 3, 1953	Former governor, Wyoming 48th in population (1950)
94	Price Daniel (D-TX)	January 3, 1953	Texas 6th in population (1950)
95	Stuart Symington (D-MO)	January 3, 1953	Missouri 12th in population (1950)
96	Barry Goldwater (R-AZ)	January 3, 1953	Arizona 37th in population (1950)
—	Alton Asa Lennon (D-NC)	July 10, 1953	
—	Robert W. Upton (R-NH)	August 14, 1953	
—	Thomas A. Burke (D-OH)	November 10, 1953	
—	Eva Bowring (D-NE)	April 16, 1954	
—	Sam Ervin (D-NC)	June 5, 1954	
—	Edward D. Crippa (R-WY)	June 24, 1954	
—	Samuel W. Reynolds (R-NE)	July 3, 1954	
—	Charles E. Daniel (D-SC)	September 6, 1954	
—	Ernest S. Brown (R-NV)	October 1, 1954	
—	Norris Cotton (R-NH)	November 8, 1954	Former representative (7 years, 10 months)
—	Roman Hruska (R-NE)	November 8, 1954	Former representative (1 year, 10 months)
—	Hazel Abel (R-NE)	November 8, 1954	
—	Joseph C. O'Mahoney (D-WY)	November 29, 1954	Previously a senator
—	W. Kerr Scott (D-NC)	November 29, 1954	
—	Alan Bible (D-NV)	December 2, 1954	
—	George H. Bender (R-OH)	December 16, 1954	
—	Strom Thurmond (I-SC)	December 24, 1954	
—	Carl Curtis (R-NE)	January 1, 1955	

The most senior senators by class were Harry F. Byrd Sr. (D-Virginia) from Class 1, Richard Russell Jr. (D-Georgia) from Class 2, and Walter F. George (D-Georgia) from Class 3. Russell was the most senior senator from his class being the junior senator from his state.

== See also ==
- 83rd United States Congress
- List of United States representatives in the 83rd Congress
