= Earle D. Willey =

American politician (1889–1950)

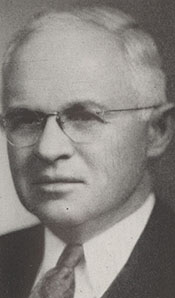

Member of the U.S. House of Representatives from Delaware's at-large district
- In office January 3, 1943 – January 3, 1945
- Preceded by: Philip A. Traynor
- Succeeded by: Philip A. Traynor

Personal details
- Born: July 21, 1889 Greenwood, Delaware, U.S.
- Died: March 17, 1950 (aged 60) Dover, Delaware, U.S.
- Party: Republican
- Education: George Washington University; Dickinson College
- Profession: Lawyer

Earle Dukes Willey (July 21, 1889 – March 17, 1950) was an American lawyer and politician from Dover, in Kent County, Delaware. He was a member of the Republican Party, and served as U.S. Representative from Delaware.

== Early life and family ==
Willey was born in Greenwood, Delaware. He attended the public schools and was graduated from Dickinson College in Carlisle, Pennsylvania, in 1911. He also attended the George Washington University Law School in Washington, D.C., and was admitted to the Delaware Bar in 1920.

== Professional and political career ==
Beginning as the principal of Greenwood High School from 1911 until 1915; Willey became secretary to U.S. Representative Thomas W. Miller in Washington, D.C., from 1915 until 1917 and state librarian from 1917 until 1921. Having been admitted to the bar, he was appointed deputy attorney general and prosecuting attorney for Kent County from 1921 until 1931, Judge of the Court of Common Pleas of Kent County from 1931 until 1939, and Judge of the juvenile court of Kent and Sussex counties from 1933 until 1939. Willey was Secretary of State from 1941 until 1943 and served as a trustee of the University of Delaware, of the Elizabeth W. Murphy School for Orphan Children, and of the State College for Colored Students.

Willey was an unsuccessful candidate for Lieutenant Governor of Delaware in 1940, being defeated by Democrat Isaac J. MacCollum. Two years later, in 1942, Willey was elected to the U.S. House of Representatives, defeating incumbent Democratic Representative Philip A. Traynor. He served in the Republican minority in the 78th Congress, and lost his bid for a second term in 1944 to his predecessor, Philip A. Traynor. Willey served from January 3, 1943, until January 3, 1945, during the administration of U.S. President Franklin D. Roosevelt. Following his term, he resumed the practice of law in Dover.

== Death and legacy ==
Willey died at Dover, Delaware, and is buried in the St. Johnstown Cemetery, near Greenwood, Delaware.

== Almanac ==
Elections are held the first Tuesday after November 1. U.S. Representatives take office January 3 and have a two-year term.

Public offices
Office	Type	Location	Began office	Ended office	Notes
Judge	Judiciary	Dover	1931	1939	Court of Common Pleas
Secretary of State of Delaware	Executive	Dover	January 15, 1941	January 3, 1943	
U.S. Representative	Legislature	Washington	January 3, 1943	January 3, 1945	

United States congressional service
Dates	Congress	Chamber	Majority	President	Committees	Class/District
1943–1945	78th	U.S. House	Democratic	Franklin D. Roosevelt		at-large

Election results
Year	Office	Subject	Party	Votes	%	Opponent	Party	Votes	%
1940	Lt. Governor	Earle D. Willey	Republican			Isaac J. MacCollum	Democratic		
1942	U.S. Representative	Earle D. Willey	Republican	45,376	54%	Philip A. Traynor	Democratic	38,791	46%
1944	U.S. Representative	Earle D. Willey	Republican	62,378	49%	Philip A. Traynor	Democratic	63,649	50%

== Places with more information ==
- Delaware Historical Society; website; 505 North Market Street, Wilmington, Delaware 19801; (302) 655-7161.
- University of Delaware; Library website; 181 South College Avenue, Newark, Delaware 19717; (302) 831-2965.
- Newark Free Library 750 Library Ave., Newark, Delaware (302) 731-7550.

Party political offices
Preceded by	Republican nominee for Lieutenant Governor of Delaware; 1940	Succeeded by Clayton A. Bunting
U.S. House of Representatives
Preceded by Philip A. Traynor	Member of the U.S. House of Representatives from Delaware's at-large congressional district January 3, 1943 – January 3, 1945	Succeeded by Philip A. Traynor
