= 1956 Delaware gubernatorial election =

- November 6, 1956
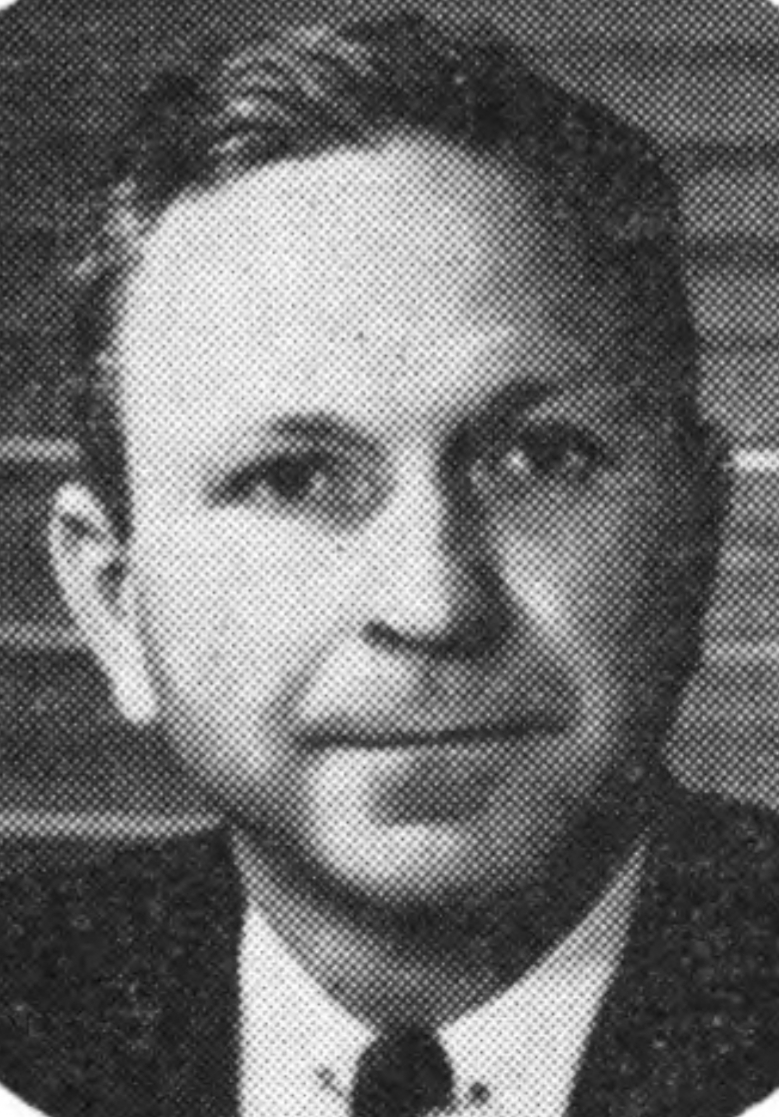

Nominee	J. Caleb Boggs	James Hoge Tyler McConnell
Party	Republican	Democratic
Popular vote	91,965	85,047
Percentage	51.95%	48.05%
- County results Boggs: 50–60% McConnell: 50–60%
Governor before election
J. Caleb Boggs
Republican
Elected Governor
J. Caleb Boggs
Republican

The 1956 Delaware gubernatorial election was held on November 6, 1956.

Incumbent Republican Governor J. Caleb Boggs defeated Democratic nominee James Hoge Tyler McConnell with 51.95% of the vote.

== Nominations ==
Nominations were made by party conventions.

=== Democratic nomination ===
The Democratic convention was held on August 30 at Dover.

==== Candidate ====
- J. H. Tyler McConnell, secretary of the Hercules Power Co., unanimous

=== Republican nomination ===
The Republican convention was held on August 29 at the Capitol Theater, Dover.

==== Candidate ====
- J. Caleb Boggs, incumbent Governor, unopposed

== General election ==
=== Results ===
1956 Delaware gubernatorial election
Party	Candidate	Votes	%	±%
Republican	J. Caleb Boggs (incumbent)	91,965	51.95%	
Democratic	J. H. Tyler McConnell	85,047	48.05%	
Majority		6,918	3.90%	
Turnout		177,012	100.00%	
Republican hold		Swing		

== Bibliography ==
- Gubernatorial Elections, 1787-1997. Washington, D.C.: Congressional Quarterly Inc. 1998. ISBN 1-56802-396-0.
- Glashan, Roy R. (1979). American Governors and Gubernatorial Elections, 1775-1978. Meckler Books. ISBN 0-930466-17-9.
