= 1966 United States Senate election in Delaware =

- November 8, 1966
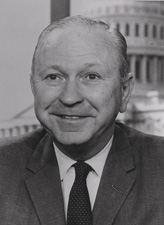

Nominee	J. Caleb Boggs	James M. Tunnell Jr.
Party	Republican	Democratic
Popular vote	97,268	67,263
Percentage	59.12%	40.88%
- County results Boggs: 50–60% 60–70%
U.S. senator before election
J. Caleb Boggs
Republican
Elected U.S. Senator
J. Caleb Boggs
Republican

The 1966 United States Senate election in Delaware took place on November 8, 1966. Incumbent Republican U.S. Senator J. Caleb Boggs was re-elected to a second term in office, defeating Democratic nominee James M. Tunnell Jr. As of 2024, this is the last time Republicans won Delaware's Class 2 Senate seat.

== General election ==
=== Candidates ===
- J. Caleb Boggs, incumbent U.S. Senator (Republican)
- James M. Tunnell Jr., former Justice of the Delaware Supreme Court and son of former Senator James M. Tunnell (Democratic)

=== Results ===
General election results
Party	Candidate	Votes	%	±%
Republican	J. Caleb Boggs (incumbent)	97,268	59.12%	▲8.41
Democratic	James M. Tunnell Jr.	67,263	40.88%	▼8.41
Total votes		164,531	100.00%	
Republican hold				

== See also ==
- 1966 United States Senate elections
