= 1952 Delaware gubernatorial election =

- November 4, 1952
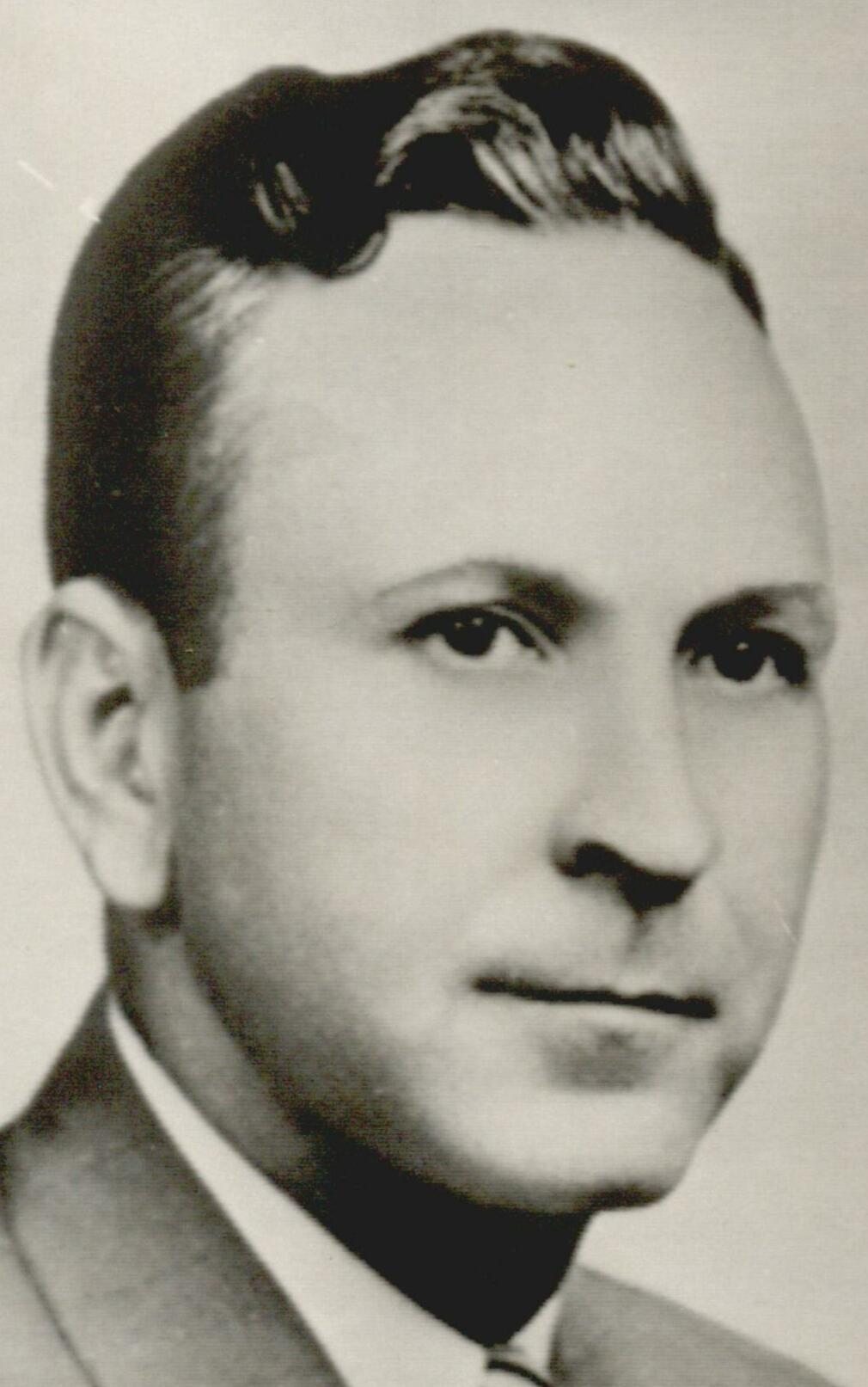

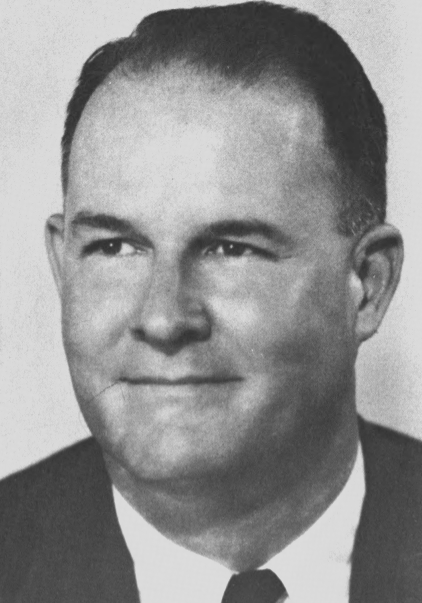
| Nominee | J. Caleb Boggs | Elbert N. Carvel |
| Party | Republican | Democratic |
| Popular vote | 88,977 | 81,772 |
| Percentage | 52.11% | 47.89% |
- County results Boggs: 50–60% Carvel: 50–60%
Governor before election
Elbert N. Carvel
Democratic
Elected Governor
J. Caleb Boggs
Republican

The 1952 Delaware gubernatorial election was held on November 4, 1952.

Incumbent Democratic Governor Elbert N. Carvel was defeated by Republican nominee J. Caleb Boggs, who won 52.11% of the vote.

== Nominations ==
Nominations were made by party conventions.

=== Democratic nomination ===
The Democratic convention was held on August 26 at Dover.

==== Candidate ====
- Elbert N. Carvel, incumbent governor, by acclamation

=== Republican nomination ===
The Republican convention was held on August 20 at Dover.

==== Candidate ====
- J. Caleb Boggs, U.S. representative for the at-large district, by acclamation

== General election ==
=== Results ===
1952 Delaware gubernatorial election
| Party | Candidate | Votes | % | ±% |
|---|---|---|---|---|
| Republican | J. Caleb Boggs | 88,977 | 52.11% | |
| Democratic | Elbert N. Carvel (incumbent) | 81,772 | 47.89% | |
| Majority | | 7,205 | 4.22% | |
| Turnout | | 170,749 | 100.00% | |
| Republican gain from Democratic | | Swing | | |

== Bibliography ==
- Gubernatorial Elections, 1787-1997. Washington, D.C.: Congressional Quarterly Inc. 1998. ISBN 1-56802-396-0.
- Glashan, Roy R. (1979). American Governors and Gubernatorial Elections, 1775-1978. Meckler Books. ISBN 0-930466-17-9.
