= 1960 United States Senate election in Delaware =

- November 8, 1960
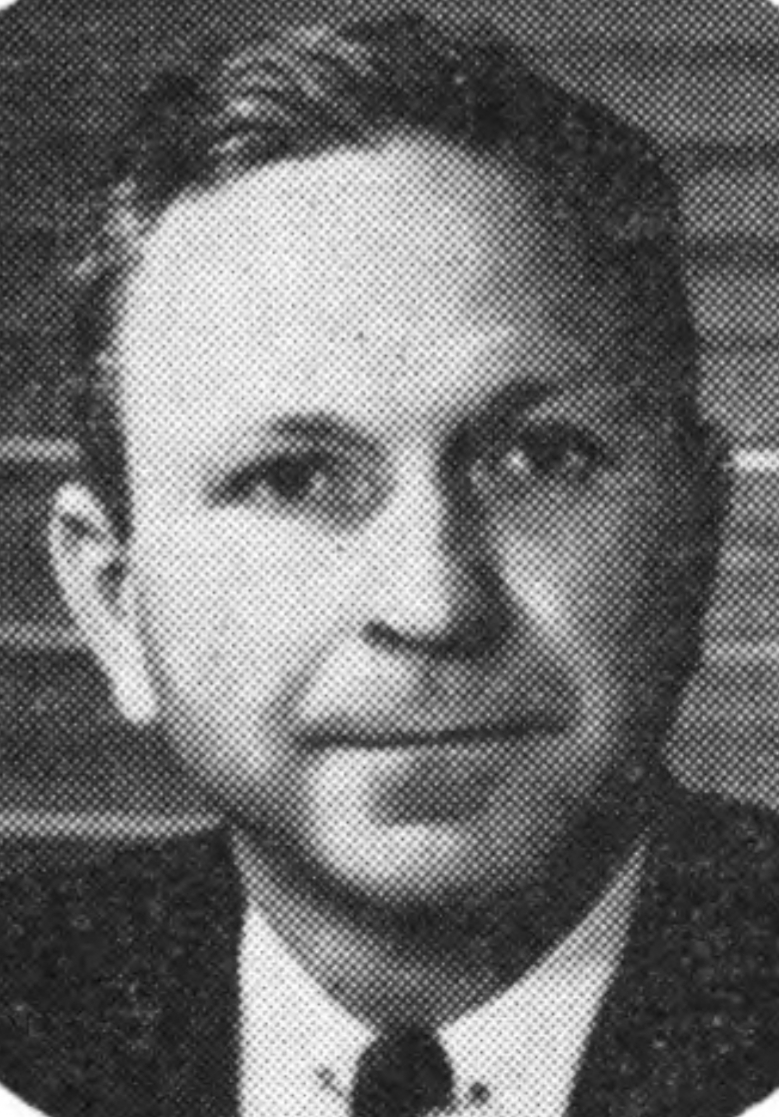

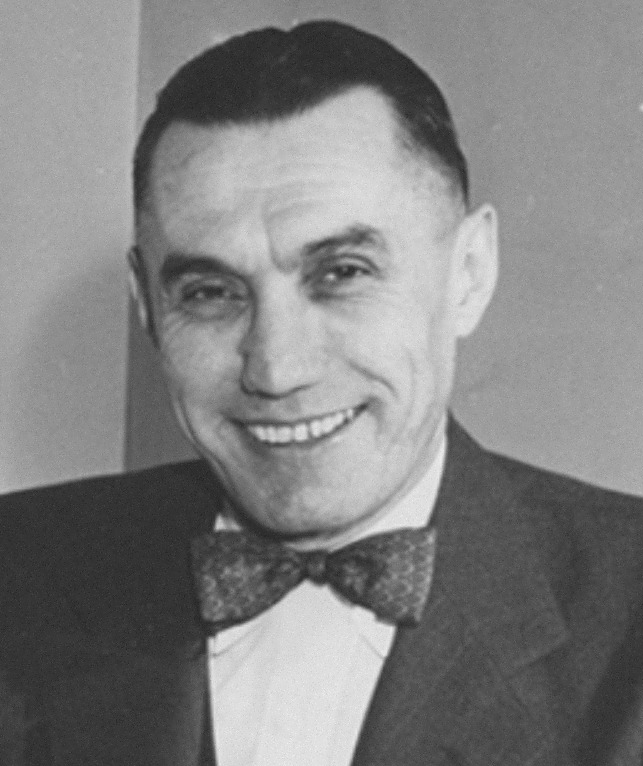
Nominee	J. Caleb Boggs	J. Allen Frear Jr.
Party	Republican	Democratic
Popular vote	98,874	96,090
Percentage	50.71%	49.29%
- County results Boggs: 50–60% Frear: 50–60%
U.S. senator before election
J. Allen Frear Jr.
Democratic
Elected U.S. Senator
J. Caleb Boggs
Republican

The 1960 United States Senate election in Delaware took place on November 8, 1960. Incumbent Democratic U.S. Senator J. Allen Frear Jr. ran for re-election to a third term in office, but was narrowly defeated by Republican Governor of Delaware J. Caleb Boggs.

== General election ==
=== Candidates ===
- J. Caleb Boggs, Governor of Delaware (Republican)
- J. Allen Frear Jr., incumbent U.S. Senator (Democratic)

=== Results ===
General election results
Party	Candidate	Votes	%	±%
Republican	J. Caleb Boggs	98,874	50.71%	▲7.65
Democratic	J. Allen Frear Jr. (inc.)	96,090	49.29%	▼7.65
Total votes		164,531	100.00%	
Republican gain from Democratic				

== See also ==
- 1960 United States Senate elections
