= 83 =

83 may refer to:

- 83 (number), the natural number following 82 and preceding 84
- one of the years 83 BC, AD 83, 1983, 2083
- 83 (film), a 2021 Indian Hindi film.
- "83", a song by John Mayer on his 2001 album Room for Squares
- '83, a combined-arms tactical first-person shooter game, successor to Rising Storm 2: Vietnam
- 83 Beatrix, a main-belt asteroid

== See also ==
- 83rd (disambiguation)
- List of highways numbered 83
