= 83rd Regiment =

83rd Regiment or 83rd Infantry Regiment may refer to:

- Royal Irish Regiment (1992), a unit of the British Army which carries on the lineage of the 83rd Ulster Defense Regiment
- 83rd Regiment of Foot (disambiguation), several units of the British Army
- 83rd Wallajahbad Light Infantry, a unit of the British Indian Army
- 83rd Field Artillery Regiment, United States
- 83rd Fighter Aviation Regiment, later Fighter-Bomber regiment, a unit of the Yugoslav Air Force

American Civil War regiments:

- 83rd Illinois Volunteer Infantry Regiment, a unit of the Union (Northern) Army
- 83rd Indiana Infantry Regiment, a unit of the Union (Northern) Army
- 83rd New York Volunteer Infantry Regiment, a unit of the Union (Northern) Army
- 83rd Ohio Infantry, a unit of the Union (Northern) Army
- 83rd Pennsylvania Infantry, a unit of the Union (Northern) Army

== See also ==
- 83rd Division (disambiguation)
- 83rd Squadron (disambiguation)
