= 83rd Division =

In military terms, 83rd Division or 83rd Infantry Division may refer to:

== Infantry divisions ==
- 83rd Infantry Division (People's Republic of China)
- 83rd Infantry Division (German Empire)
- 83rd Infantry Division (Wehrmacht), Germany
- 83rd Infantry Division (Russian Empire)
- 83rd Guards Motor Rifle Division, Soviet Union
- 83rd Guards Rifle Division, Soviet Union
- 83rd Mountain Rifle Division, Soviet Union
- 83rd Rifle Division, Soviet Union
- 83rd Infantry Division (United States)

== Cavalry divisions ==
- 83rd Cavalry Division, Soviet Union

== See also ==
- List of military divisions by number
- 83rd Brigade (disambiguation)
- 83rd Regiment (disambiguation)
- 83rd Squadron (disambiguation)
