= J. Allen Frear Jr. =

American politician (1903–1993)

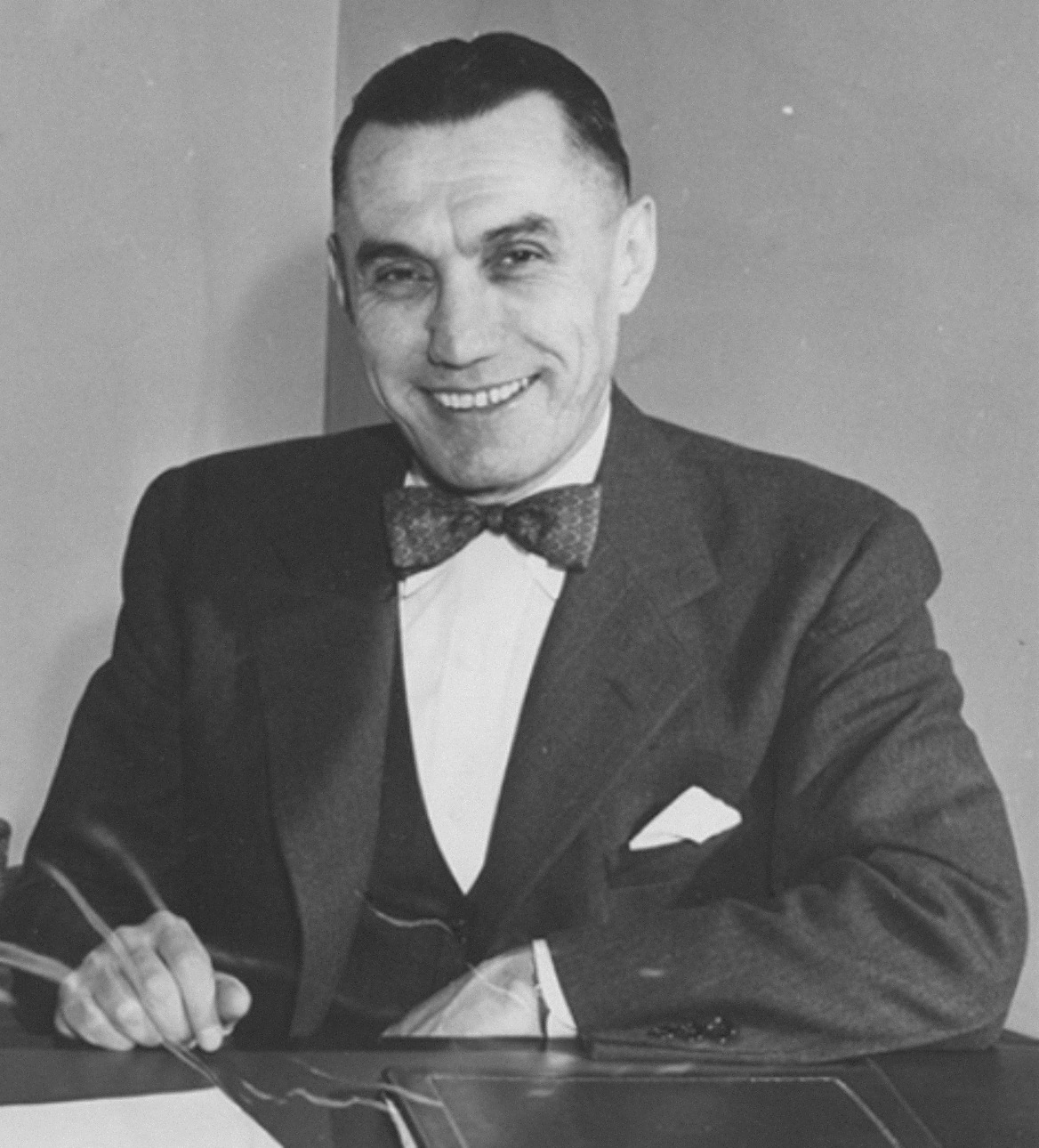

United States Senator from Delaware
- In office January 3, 1949 – January 3, 1961
- Preceded by: C. Douglass Buck
- Succeeded by: J. Caleb Boggs

Personal details
- Born: Joseph Allen Frear Jr. March 7, 1903 Kent County, Delaware, U.S.
- Died: January 15, 1993 (aged 89) Dover, Delaware, U.S.
- Party: Democratic
- Education: University of Delaware (BS)
- Occupation: Businessman

Military service
- Branch/service: United States Army
- Years of service: 1944–1946
- Rank: Major
- Battles/wars: World War II

Joseph Allen Frear Jr. (March 7, 1903 – January 15, 1993) was an American businessman and politician. A Democrat, he served as a United States senator from Delaware from 1949 to 1961. He was defeated for a third term by Republican Governor J. Caleb Boggs in 1960.

== Early life ==
J. Allen Frear was born on a farm near Rising Sun, in Kent County, Delaware, to Joseph Allen and Clara (née Lowber) Frear. His mother died in 1922, and his father subsequently married her brother's daughter. Frear was a distant relative of Robert E. Freer, who served as chairman of the Federal Trade Commission. One of three children, he received his early education at local public schools, and graduated from Caesar Rodney High School in 1920.

Frear studied at the University of Delaware in Newark, where he received a bachelor of science degree in agriculture in 1924. Following his graduation, he became operator of three farms and president of a retail business that distributed milk, fuel, farm machinery, and fertilizer. He served as commissioner of Delaware State College in Dover (1936–1941) and of the Delaware Old Age Welfare Commission (1938–1948). Also interested in banking, he was director (1938–1946) and chairman of the board (1946–1948) of the Federal Land Bank in Baltimore, Maryland. During World War II, he served as a major in the U.S. Army from 1944 to 1946. From 1947 to 1951, he was president of Kent General Hospital in Dover.

== Political career ==
Frear was elected to the U.S. Senate in 1948, defeating incumbent Republican Senator C. Douglass Buck in a close race. During this term, he served in the Democratic majority in the 81st and 82nd Congresses, and the Democratic minority in the 83rd Congress. He was again elected to the U.S. Senate in 1954, defeating Republican Representative Herbert B. Warburton by a wider than expected margin. During this term, he again served with the Democratic majority in the 84th, 85th, and 86th congresses. Frear did not sign the 1956 Southern Manifesto and voted in favor of the Civil Rights Act of 1960, while not voting on the Civil Rights Act of 1957.

Frear narrowly lost his bid for a third term in 1960 to Republican Governor J. Caleb Boggs. In all, he served in the Senate from January 3, 1949, to January 3, 1961. After he left the Senate, President John F. Kennedy appointed him to the Securities and Exchange Commission, where he served from 1961 until 1963. Later he resumed his career in business and banking.

== Death and legacy ==
Frear died at Dover and is buried in the Odd Fellows Cemetery at Camden, Delaware. The J. Allen Frear Federal Building at 300 South New Street in Dover is named in his honor. There is also an Allen Frear Elementary School in Camden.

Public offices
Office	Type	Location	Began office	Ended office	Notes
U.S. Senator	Legislature	Washington	January 3, 1949	January 3, 1955	
U.S. Senator	Legislature	Washington	January 3, 1955	January 3, 1961	

United States congressional service
Dates	Congress	Chamber	Majority	President	Committees	Class/District
1949–1951	81st	U.S. Senate	Democratic	Harry S. Truman		class 2
1951–1953	82nd	U.S. Senate	Democratic	Harry S. Truman		class 2
1953–1955	83rd	U.S. Senate	Republican	Dwight D. Eisenhower		class 2
1955–1957	84th	U.S. Senate	Democratic	Dwight D. Eisenhower		class 2
1957–1959	85th	U.S. Senate	Democratic	Dwight D. Eisenhower		class 2
1959–1961	86th	U.S. Senate	Democratic	Dwight D. Eisenhower		class 2

Election results
Year	Office	Subject	Party	Votes	%	Opponent	Party	Votes	%
1948	U.S. Senator	J. Allen Frear Jr.	Democratic	71,888	51%	C. Douglass Buck	Republican	68,246	48%
1954	U.S. Senator	J. Allen Frear Jr.	Democratic	82,511	57%	Herbert B. Warburton	Republican	62,389	43%
1960	U.S. Senator	J. Allen Frear Jr.	Democratic	96,090	49%	J. Caleb Boggs	Republican	98,874	51%

== Images ==
- Political and Historical Figures Portrait Gallery Portrait courtesy of Historical and Cultural Affairs, Dover.

Party political offices
Preceded by E. Ennalls Berl	Democratic Party nominee for United States Senator from Delaware (Class 2); 1948, 1954, 1960	Succeeded by James M. Tunnell Jr.
Political offices
U.S. Senate
Preceded by C. Douglass Buck	U.S. Senator (Class 2) from Delaware; 1949–1961; Served alongside: John J. Williams	Succeeded by J. Caleb Boggs
