= 83 Squadron =

83 Squadron or 83rd Squadron may refer to:

- No. 83 Squadron RAAF, a unit of the Royal Australian Air Force
- No. 83 Squadron RAF, a unit of the Royal Air Force
- VFA-83 (Strike Fighter Squadron 83), a unit of the United States Navy
- 83 Juno Beach Squadron, a Royal Canadian Air Cadet squadron

== See also ==
- 83rd Regiment (disambiguation)
- 83rd Division (disambiguation)
