= Lindner ethics complaint of the 83rd Minnesota Legislative Session =

2004 ethics complaint in the United States

In 2004 then State Rep. Keith Ellison (DFL-Minneapolis) and a group of fellow Democratic-Farmer-Labor members of the Minnesota State House of Representatives filed an ethics complaint against State Rep. Arlon Lindner (R-Corcoran) for a speech he made which Ellison alleged amounted to a denial that homosexuals were targeted by the Nazis and were killed during the Holocaust.

== Lindner as controversial figure ==
In early 2003 Ellison was among several DFL legislators who filed an ethics complaint against Rep. Arlon Lindner (R-Corcoran) representing House District 33A. At the time Lindner was already seen as controversial.

In 1997 as the case of Baehr v. Miike was progressing through the Hawaiian State Court system, Minnesotan social conservatives feared their state would recognize same-sex marriages performed there. They feared that the "Full Faith and Credit Clause" of the United States Constitution would require this, despite the Federal Defense of Marriage Act passed in 1996. In response a debate over banning gay and lesbian marriage occurred in the Minnesota Legislature. On the House floor Lindner claimed that allowing same-sex marriage would open the door to "a man marrying a child or a man marrying a dog." Openly gay State Rep. Karen Clark (whose partner, parents, and her partner's parents were attending the debate) expressed dismay at the comment. Lindner told her "I don't know why you felt that was insulting. I was trying to make a point, that we've got a norm of one man, one woman. Once we begin to deviate...what's to keep us from having to pass laws to allow a man to marry several women, or a man and a boy relationship -- and there are people who would like to have that. When we start changing that definition of marriage, that does open up the door to others who will say 'Why not us?'" He told Clark that while he saw her as "one of God's creations. ...I personally don't think the lifestyle you've chosen and other homosexuals have chosen is really good for you, your partner or society. ...I'm talking in general, the HIV/AIDS problem, other diseases. It probably affects more homosexual men. ...I don't know of any [heterosexual] couple, where they've been faithful to each other, a man and a woman, has any fear of any sexually transmitted disease unless they have to get a blood transfusion. ...you're living in sin." He also stated "I don't believe adoption of children by homosexual couples is in the best interests of children." (In 1997 Minnesota enacted the Marriage Protection Act defining marriage as a "civil contract between a man and a woman" and stating that "Lawful marriage may be contracted only between persons of the opposite sex".)

In May 2001 Lindner was outraged by the news that Tenzin Gyatso, 14th Dalai Lama was going to address the Minnesota Legislature. In an e-mail to House members he stated "As a Christian, I am offended that we would have the Dalai Lama come and speak to a joint meeting of our Minnesota Legislature. He claims to be a god-king, a leader of the Buddha religion, which historically has been considered a cult because of its anti-Biblical teachings concerning the one true Holy God, Creator of Heaven and earth and His Son, Jesus Christ. A Buddhist would say, 'Why the big fuss about abortion and euthanasia? After all, we are all reincarnated over and over again in many lives, so why the big deal about ending one?' These beliefs are incompatible with Christian principles, and those Christian principles are or have been the governing principles of American society. There is a public religious ethic that prevails in this country, Judeo-Christian, demanding a public adherence to that standard in terms of behavior rather than belief. The Judeo-Christian ethic is the moral and spiritual foundation of our Constitution, Bill of Rights and most of our laws and it has served us well. ...I for one will not be present on the morning of May 9."

By the 83rd Minnesota Legislative Session Lindner had already faced an ethics complaint before. This was a result of his reaction to the request of Rep. Paymar. His first complaint stemmed from a May 2000 incident after the Republican Party took control of the House and some members felt that the prayers opening the session were becoming too sectarian. "For many, things went too far when House leaders recently brought in a choir to open the day's session with a musical rendition of the Apostles' Creed." In light of this Rep. Michael Paymar (DFL-St. Paul) who is Jewish said "I would like to be part of that moment where a religious leader gets up before us and has a prayer. But I would like that to be non-denominational, and I would like it to be respectful of who I am." In response to his and others' concerns a rule was passed "requiring that in the future, prayer be non-denominational." In responding to Paymar, Lindner said "You know, we're told there's one God and one mediator between God and man. That man is Jesus Christ. And most of us here are Christians. And we shouldn't be left not able to pray in the name of our God....And if you don't like it, you may have to like it-Or just don't come. I don't come sometimes for some prayers here....We have that privilege, and you need to exercise it. But don't impose your irreligious left views on me." Rep. Matt Entenza (DFL-St. Paul), called on Lindner "to rethink his comments. When Lindner refused to reply, Entenza put forth a 'protest of dissent' petition asking the House Ethics Committee to reprimand Lindner. It was signed by 60 House members, including eight Republicans." Later "The ethics panel found the comments 'regrettable', but took no disciplinary action."

== Context of Lindner's remarks ==
In 1993 Minnesota passed a provision that added sexual orientation to the state's human rights law. The provision has been characterized by its supporters as protecting "gay and lesbian teachers and students from discrimination". In early 2003 Rep. Lindner claimed that the provision was a shield for the promotion of homosexuality, "In some of the schools, we've got children as young as three, in pre-school, on up through the years that are being taught homosexual practices. And it doesn't mean they're going to be homosexual, but unfortunately they hear about some of the sexual activities of the homosexual, and they're being told that it's safe and so forth and healthy, and it isn't." He claimed "parents have complained to the schools, and administrators have told them that there's nothing they can do because of state law." Lindner co-authored a bill to repeal this provision and worked to get it a hearing by a House committee. Meeting with homosexuals opposed to his bill Lindner stressed "I don't hate any of those people. I know they accuse me of hating and wanting all kind of terrible things to happen to them, but I don't hate any of them. I do love them. Actually this would benefit them if they were to leave that lifestyle or if they would maybe be more faithful to one partner, if it's got to be that way. But it's my understanding that gays have hundreds and even thousands of partners over a lifetime." His remarks were seen as offensive by many Minnesotan homosexuals who said "most gays and lesbians are in committed relationships." They also took issue with Lindner's suggestion that homosexuality is a lifestyle choice.

== Holocaust remarks ==
The complaint from Ellison and company came after Lindner made several comments he made on the floor of the House while he "introduced a bill that would repeal the state's pro-gay human rights amendment and remove sexual orientation from its hate-crimes law." Lindner said "Most of my life, when the word Holocaust was referred to, it usually referred to the Jewish suffering and death that occurred under the Nazi occupation. It's just been within the recent two or three years that it's been brought forward that homosexuals also suffered like that....It never happened. I was a child during World War II, and I've read a lot about World War II. It's just been recently that anyone's come out with this idea that homosexuals were persecuted to this extent. There's been a lot of rewriting of history."

== Response to Lindner's remarks ==
Linder's comments not only drew a response from members of the DFL, but also from Hinda Kibort, an 82-year-old Holocaust survivor who had lived in a concentration camp in Germany from 1941 to 1945. She said "[h]is obvious lack of knowledge concerning Nazi barbarity in World War II is appalling." She stated that the Nazis identified homosexuals in her camp with pink stars, and that "[u]nlike Lindner, I did not learn about World War II and the Nazi holocaust by reading books. I was in a concentration camp and can testify to the fact that homosexuals were indeed persecuted based on their sexuality."

Some of Lindner's critics invited him to join their upcoming trip to in Washington, D.C. for Holocaust Remembrance Day. Lindner said he would only consider the offer "if others pay for his trip and time off." Lindner claimed that "no one can fully know what happened 60 years ago..." and said "I just think it's strange that over 58, 60 years it's just willing to come out about that. We know there's been a lot of rewriting of history lately and in my mind that's possibly an area where that's happening."

== Lindner responds to the controversy ==
On March 10, 2004 Lindner complained that critics of his remarks were not focusing on the real motives of his bill and his speech. He said "that homosexuality, the rise in sexually transmitted diseases, and comprehensive sexual health education could prompt a future 'holocaust' in Minnesota". On the House floor he said, "[w]hat I am trying to prevent is the holocaust of our children getting STDs, AIDS, and various other diseases that are going to affect their lives. If you want to sit around here and wait until America becomes another African continent, well, then, you do that, but I'm going to do something about it." Whatever his intentions, Lindner's new remarks only managed to offend more Jews and Gays, while upsetting many African Americans within Minnesota. With respect to the accuracy of his claims that gays weren't targeted via death camps, Lindner said he was continuing his "research " on the issue.

== Ethics complaint is filed ==
Ellison, one of only two African-American state lawmakers at the time (the other being Rep. Neva Walker of District 61B), became the spokesman of the DFL group that filed with the Ethics Committee against Lindner. Besides Ellison the group consisted of Representatives Karen Clark, Frank Hornstein (whose mother is a Holocaust survivor), Margaret Anderson Kelliher, Neva Walker, Lyndon Carlson, Ron Latz, and House Minority Leader Matt Entenza. The complaint held "that when Lindner expressed his belief that homosexuals may not have been persecuted during the Nazi Holocaust, his conduct violated 'accepted norms of House behavior' and that his comments 'bring the House into dishonor or disrepute.'" Ellison stated that they sought "censure of Lindner and his removal as chair of the Economic Development and Tourism Division of the House Commerce, Jobs, and Economic Development Policy Committee." Ellison's group exhibited letters from out-of-state residents who said they cancelled vacation plans in Minnesota after learning of Lindner's comments. Ellison stated "There's a question mark hanging over the State Office Building. The question is 'Do the people of the state of Minnesota and the legislators that represent them share the viewpoint that people who were victims of Nazi persecution were in fact not victims of Nazi persecution?' Mr. Lindner has insulted not only the House but members of the community at large." The Session Weekly reported "'The fact of the matter is his conduct calls for discipline,' said Ellison, who added that a censure penalty does not prohibit Lindner from saying what he believes. 'It would just be a denunciation, a condemnation, of what he said.'" Ellison told Minnesota Public Radio "That question mark sitting over this building is whether we represent all the people of this state or not. And whether or not an elected official, a person who holds an election certificate can spout bigoted language, mean-spirited, untrue statements designed to injure members of the community and members of this body. That is the issue."

== Walker-Black letter ==
In the middle of the controversy about Lindner's remarks his lawyer sent a routine legal request for discovery to Rep. Neva Walker, an African-American DFL member from Minneapolis. The letter was addressed to her as "Walker-Black". Walker had never been married, didn't use a hyphenated name, and had never had the last name Black. It appeared as if someone forgot to remove the race notation before signing and sending out that letter. James Anderson, Lindner's lawyer, apologized to Walker saying it was a "simple mistake. I can tell you that the person typing the letter apparently looked at the file and put the words together wrong [from a form that listed her name by her race]." Walker said "I do believe it was an accident and somebody forgot to erase it. ...I am an elected official and I deserve respect, and that misprint is a lack of respect." The lawyer said "Basically, it's a tempest in a teapot," he said, adding that "some people are just hypersensitive if from a simple mistake they can call someone a racist." Walker responded, "It's easy to say that when you're not on the receiving of a racist comment, but racist attacks are emotionally and mentally draining. And I am far from sensitive. It takes a lot to offend me. ...Folks who are so focused on this issue don't realize that there is a pattern with this particular representative."

== Norm Coleman responds ==
On March 12, 2003 it was reported that then-US Senator Norm Coleman, who is Jewish, was calling on his fellow Minnesota Republicans to "reject" Lindner's "deplorable and historically inaccurate" view on the Holocaust.

== Minnesota House Republicans response ==
The Republicans in the Minnesota House dismissed the idea of speech being an ethics violation, maintaining "Lindner's comments were offensive, but Lindner has the right to say them." Republican House Speaker Steve Sviggum pointed out that "House Republicans didn't complain when Rep. Tom Rukavina, DFL-Virginia, called State Auditor Pat Awada, 'Osama Bin Awada'" when Awada proposed to curb local government aid. Sviggum said "everyone is entitled to First Amendment rights. 'At some point or another people have freedom of speech even though that speech may not be appropriate, politically correct or even the most wise speech.'" Sviggum said "I don't think that we want to take this to the ultimate end and put that chilling effect upon speech, upon feeling, upon values and principals that one has or doesn't have in this entire process." Lindner also invoked freedom of speech, saying "I still believe in the First Amendment -- that we're allowed to express our views and so forth -- and it's getting close to maybe not being able to do that, but while we can, I'm doing it." In their rebuttal the House Republicans also played a recording of Ellison's interview with a radio station. In the interview Ellison had said "People should feel free to express themselves as long as they don't violate the law. ...I would never invoke the powers of the state to restrict Arlon Lindner from expressing himself."

== Lindner versus charge of anti-Semitism ==
At the Ethics Committee hearing Holocaust survivor Hinda Kibort testified against Lindner, saying she saw him as a holocaust denier "Because if he denies a part of what happened, he denies the Holocaust. There is no way around that."

Lindner stressed that he was not denying Jewish suffering, believing the only way his comments could be construed that way was because they "were edited by Democrats". Lindner (who originally came to Minnesota from Texas to earn his Master of Divinity from Central Baptist Theological Seminary in Minneapolis) stressed his theological opposition to harming Jews, "As a Christian who believes the Bible is true, there has always been a special place in my heart and life for God's words about the Jewish people. In Genesis 12:3, the Lord says regarding the Jewish nation, 'I will bless them that bless thee and I will curse them that curse thee.' ...God has given us the Bible as our guide for living. The Bible teaches me homosexual activity is wrong, sinful, and harmful. ...The Jew shall always be my friend."

Lindner also denied he was being bigoted in his reference to Africa saying "he should have specified one African country that is being decimated by AIDS." He also claimed he would "continue his research on homosexuality in Nazi Germany to get all sides on this issue."

== Results of the complaint ==
A House Ethics Committee motion to censure Lindner failed in a 2-2 vote following party lines. After the motion failed Lindner "told reporters he stands by his comments. 'I certainly do,' he said. Asked whether he regretted saying them, Lindner responded 'not in the least.'" After the committee's decision and still upset with Lindner's comments, Bill English of the Coalition of Black Churches approached Lindner and told him he "offended an entire continent of people." He then called Lindner "a redneck", and the two argued over which one of them was intolerant.

Lindner's bill to remove state human rights protection for gays, lesbians, bisexual and transgender people did not get a committee hearing and was never brought up for a vote in the House. Governor Tim Pawlenty said he was "deeply troubled by Lindner's comments" adding "From my standpoint, his comments and perspective certainly do not reflect where the Republican Party is or should be." Pawlenty said he "wouldn't sign Lindner's proposed human rights repeal legislation as written." This despite "concerns about portions of the current law." (In his 2002 gubernatorial campaign Pawlenty called his 1993 vote as a freshman legislator, "to include sexual orientation in the human rights law, which prohibits certain forms of discrimination based on such factors as race, ethnicity, religion and disability status" as "the one vote he regrets.")

== United States Holocaust Museum exhibit ==
In late 2003 in response to the controversy over Lindner's comments the United States Holocaust Museum arranged for an unscheduled stop in Minneapolis for its "Nazi Persecutions of Homosexuals 1933-1945". The exhibit focused on Paragraph 175 of the German penal code (which banned sexual intimacy between members of the same gender) and "describes a purposeful effort by the Nazis that resulted in about 100,000 arrests, 50,000 imprisonments, an untold number of deaths in concentration camps and such things as forced castrations". While one news service claimed Lindner refused to attend another reported that he accepted "an invitation to tour the exhibition with Stephen Silberfarb, executive director of the Jewish Community Relations Council of Minnesota and the Dakotas" and said he was "looking forward to it". In that interview he claimed that what he had been misunderstood during the whole controversy "I said I didn't believe that homosexuals were persecuted to the same extent that Jewish people were. I was thinking more number-wise."

== Lindner and the 2004 elections ==
At the time Republicans said "any action will be taken by the voters in Lindner's district, who can decide whether to re-elect the six-term lawmaker." Lindner who had been serving District 32A in the Minnesota House of Representatives since 1993, was denied the Republican endorsement in the 2004 elections. Joyce Peppin who received the endorsement said it was because Lindner was "a flawed messenger for the conservative agenda...You can't change hearts and minds when you are constantly offending people". He then ran as an independent. In the general election the results were Joyce Peppin (R) 14,273 votes 53.8%, Caroll Holmstrom (D) 7,112 votes 26.8%, Arlon Lindner (I) 5,114 votes 19.3%; so Lindner failed in his re-election bid.

== Effect on Keith Ellison's 2006 campaign ==
=== Endorsement ===
During Minnesota's 2006 DFL primary for Minnesota's 5th District seat in the United States House of Representatives the Twin Cities-based publication American Jewish World endorsed Keith Ellison citing his work during the ethics complaint as one of their reasons. They wrote "Ellison acted as the lawyer for the House DFL caucus in an ethics proceeding against former representative Arlon Lindner, who contended that gays were not victims of Nazi oppression in the Holocaust. Ellison understands the importance of guarding against Holocaust denial and revisionism, and links the lessons of the Shoah to more recent cases of genocide in Rwanda and Darfur." The Ellison campaign called this an "extremely valued and valuable endorsement", and Ellison said "I am humbled, and just plain thrilled, by the confidence the American Jewish World has placed in my vision of a just future where there are no throw-away people and peace is our guiding principle. ...This is how we will win – by creating a powerful force of real people unified behind a passion for justice." The Minnesota Monitor described the endorsement's influence on the race as a "bombshell".

=== Criticizing Rumsfeld ===
During his 2006 campaign Ellison invoked the Lindner controversy when rebutting remarks of the Secretary of Defense.

On August 29, 2006 Sec. Donald Rumsfeld said "Over the next decades [1920s-30s], a sentiment took root that contended that if only the growing threats that had begun to emerge in Europe and Asia could be accommodated, then the carnage and the destruction of then-recent memory of World War I could be avoided. It was a time when a certain amount of cynicism and moral confusion set in among Western democracies. When those who warned about a coming crisis, the rise of fascism and Nazism, they were ridiculed or ignored. Indeed, in the decades before World War II, a great many argued that the fascist threat was exaggerated or that it was someone else's problem. Some nations tried to negotiate a separate peace, even as the enemy made its deadly ambitions crystal clear. It was, as Winston Churchill observed, a bit like feeding a crocodile, hoping it would eat you last. ...I recount that history because once again we face similar challenges in efforts to confront the rising threat of a new type of fascism. Today -- another enemy, a different kind of enemy -- has made clear its intentions with attacks in places like New York and Washington, D.C., Bali, London, Madrid, Moscow and so many other places. But some seem not to have learned history's lessons. ...With the growing lethality and the increasing availability of weapons, can we truly afford to believe that somehow, some way, vicious extremists can be appeased? Can folks really continue to think that free countries can negotiate a separate peace with terrorists?"

In his press release Ellison was outraged "on two counts – that Rumsfeld's comments are deeply un-American in their disrespect for the right of free speech, and are equally offensive for trivializing the evil of the Nazi regime, which manifested itself most tragically in the Holocaust of Jews and many others. ...As one of the leaders in the Minnesota House in the fight to censure then- Representative Arlon Lindner for remarks that were anti-Semitic, homophobic and denied aspects of the Holocaust, I take this comparison personally. All who care about preserving the truth about the Holocaust should decry a trivialization of this horrible injustice."
