= 83rd Street =

83rd Street may refer to:

== Chicago ==
- 83rd Street/Avalon Park station, on the Metra Electric main line
- 83rd Street/South Chicago station, on the Metra Electric South Chicago branch

== Elsewhere ==
- 83rd Street (Manhattan), New York City
