= Herbert Warburton =

American politician (1916–1983)

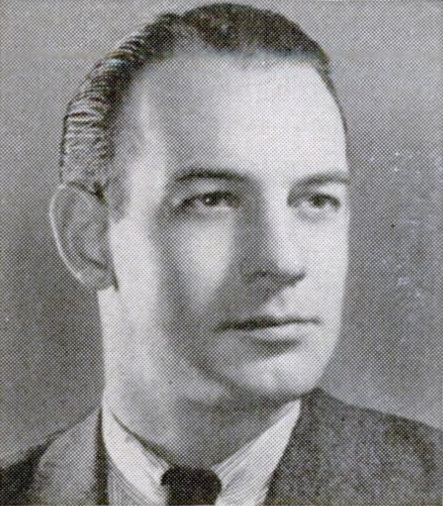
- From 1953's Pocket Congressional Directory of the 83rd Congress.

Member of the U.S. House of Representatives from Delaware's at-large district
- In office January 3, 1953 – January 3, 1955
- Preceded by: J. Caleb Boggs
- Succeeded by: Harris McDowell

Personal details
- Born: September 21, 1916 Wilmington, Delaware, US
- Died: July 30, 1983 (aged 66) Lewes, Delaware, US
- Party: Republican
- Education: University of Delaware; Dickinson School of Law
- Profession: Lawyer

Military service
- Allegiance: United States
- Branch/service: United States Army
- Years of service: 1941–1946
- Rank: Major
- Unit: 122nd Anti-Aircraft Artillery Battalion
- Battles/wars: World War II

Herbert Birchby Warburton (September 21, 1916 – July 30, 1983) was an American lawyer and politician from Wilmington, in New Castle County, Delaware, and Frankford, in Sussex County, Delaware. He was a veteran of World War II, and a member of the Republican Party, and served as U.S. Representative from Delaware.

== Early life and family ==
Warburton was born in Wilmington, Delaware. He attended the public schools of Wilmington and Reading, Pennsylvania, and graduated from the University of Delaware in Newark in 1938, and from Dickinson School of Law in Carlisle, Pennsylvania, in 1941.

An ROTC graduate from the University of Delaware, he was commissioned a second lieutenant, and began active army duty as first lieutenant of the One Hundred and Twenty-second Antiaircraft Battalion in September 1941. After graduation from the Command and General Staff School at Fort Leavenworth, Kansas, in September 1945, he served as a battalion commander until relieved from active duty as a major in December 1945.

== Professional and political career ==
Warburton was admitted to the Delaware Bar in absentia in 1942 and began a practice following his return from the Army in 1946. He served as city solicitor for Wilmington from 1949 until 1952. Warburton was elected to the U.S. House of Representatives in 1952, defeating Democrat Joseph J. Scannell. He served in the Republican majority in the 83rd Congress. In 1954 he did not seek another term in the U.S. House, but unsuccessfully sought the United States Senate seat of incumbent Democrat J. Allen Frear Jr. In all, Warburton served from January 3, 1953, until January 3, 1955, all but the first 17 days falling during the administration of U.S. President Dwight D. Eisenhower.

Following his congressional service, Warburton was appointed special assistant to United States Secretary of Labor, James P. Mitchell, from 1955 until 1957, general counsel for the Post Office Department from 1957 until 1961, and minority counsel to the U.S. House Government Operations subcommittee, serving there from 1961 to 1964. Subsequently, he became a resident of Frankford, Delaware, and was executive director of the American Orthotics and Prosthetics Association and the American Board for Certification in Orthotics and Prosthetics.

== Death and legacy ==
Warburton died in Lewes, Delaware.

== Almanac ==
Elections are held the first Tuesday after November 1. U.S. Representatives take office January 3 and have a two-year term.

Public offices
Office	Type	Location	Began office	Ended office	Notes
U.S. Representative	Legislature	Washington	January 3, 1953	January 3, 1955	

United States congressional service
Dates	Congress	Chamber	Majority	President	Committees	Class/District
1953–1955	83rd	U.S. House	Republican	Dwight D. Eisenhower		at-large

Election results
Year	Office	Subject	Party	Votes	%	Opponent	Party	Votes	%
1952	U.S. Representative	Herbert Warburton	Republican	88,285	52%	Joseph J. Scannell	Democratic	81,730	48%
1954	U.S. Senator	Herbert Warburton	Republican	62,389	43%	J. Allen Frear, Jr.	Democratic	82,511	57%

Party political offices
Preceded by C. Douglass Buck	Republican nominee for U.S. Senator from Delaware (Class 2); 1954	Succeeded by J. Caleb Boggs
U.S. House of Representatives
Preceded by J. Caleb Boggs	Member of the U.S. House of Representatives from Delaware's at-large congressional district January 3, 1953 – January 3, 1955	Succeeded by Harris McDowell
