= 83rd Regiment of Foot =

Three regiments of the British Army have been numbered the 83rd Regiment of Foot:

- 83rd Regiment of Foot (1757), raised in 1757, disbanded 1763, opposed the 1762 Spanish invasion of Portugal
- 83rd Regiment of Foot (Royal Glasgow Volunteers), raised in 1777, disbanded 1783
- 83rd (County of Dublin) Regiment of Foot, raised in 1793, amalgamated with the 86th (Royal County Down) Regiment of Foot to form the Royal Irish Rifles in 1881
