= James M. Tunnell Jr. =

American judge (1910–1986)

James Miller Tunnell Jr. (June 17, 1910 – January 10, 1986) was the Democratic Party nominee for United States Senator from Delaware in the 1966 United States Senate election in Delaware. He was the son of Senator James M. Tunnell. He served as a justice of the Delaware Supreme Court from 1951 to 1954. In 1951, when Delaware opted to establish a Supreme Court, Governor Elbert N. Carvel offered appointments to both Tunnell and Daniel F. Wolcott. According to Carvel, each "declared their unwillingness to serve if the other was chief justice", leading Carvel to appoint both as associate justices, and Clarence A. Southerland as chief justice.

Party political offices
| Preceded by J. Allen Frear Jr. | Democratic Party nominee for United States Senator from Delaware (Class 2); 1966 | Succeeded by Joe Biden |
