= 1948 United States Senate elections =

- November 2, 1948
- Class 2

33 of the 96 seats in the United States Senate 49 seats needed for a majority
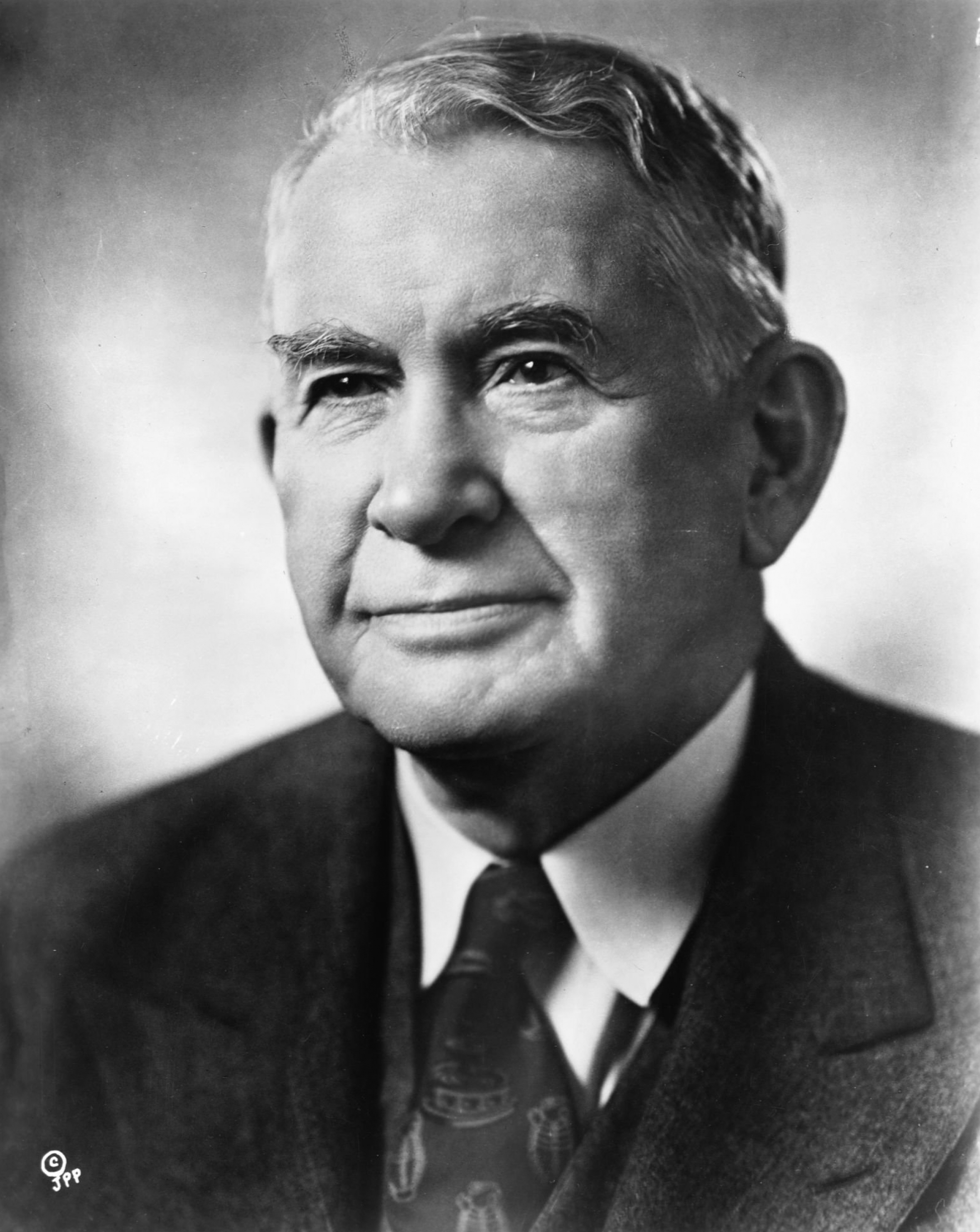

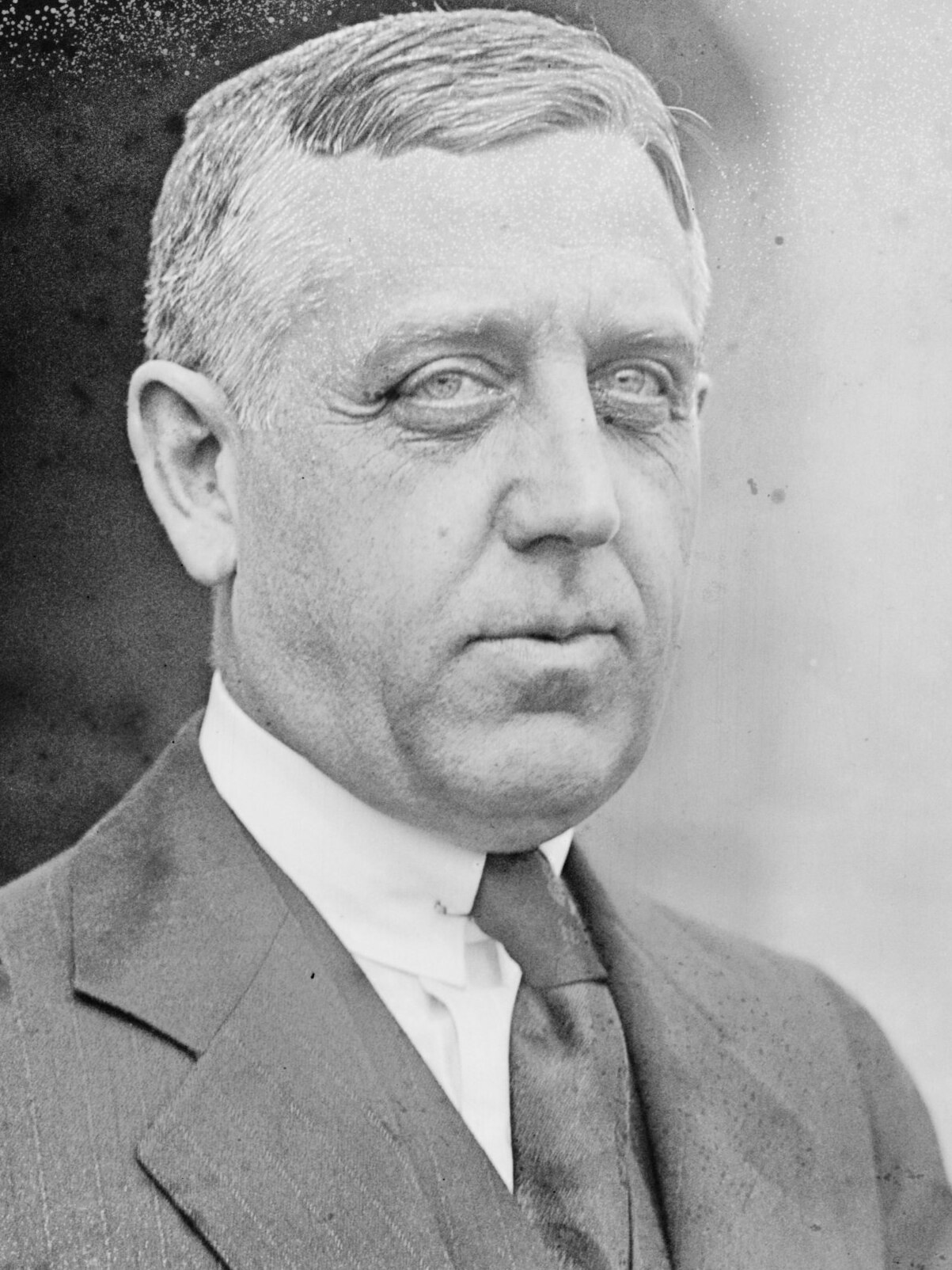
	Majority party	Minority party
Leader	Alben Barkley (retired upon being elected vice president)	Wallace White (retired)
Party	Democratic	Republican
Leader since	July 22, 1937	February 25, 1944
Leader's seat	Kentucky	Maine
Seats before	45	51
Seats after	54	42
Seat change	▲9	▼9
Popular vote	13,056,944	9,764,384
Percentage	56.5%	42.3%
Seats up	15	18
Races won	24	9
- Results of the elections: Democratic gain Democratic hold Republican hold No election Rectangular inset (Louisiana): both seats up for election
Majority Leader before election
Wallace White
Republican
Elected Majority Leader
Scott Lucas
Democratic

The 1948 United States Senate elections were held concurrently with the election of Democratic President Harry S. Truman for a full term. The 32 seats of Class 2 were contested in regular elections, and one special election was held to fill a vacancy. Truman campaigned against an "obstructionist" Congress that had blocked many of his initiatives, and additionally, the U.S. economy had recovered from the post-World War II Recession of 1945 by election day. The decline in government spending at the end of World War II had led to an enormous drop in gross domestic product, making this technically a recession. This was the result of demobilization and the shift from a wartime economy to a peacetime economy. The post-war years were unusual in a number of ways (unemployment was never high), and this era may be considered a "sui generis end-of-the-war recession".

Thus, Truman was rewarded with a Democratic gain of nine seats in the Senate, enough to give them control of the chamber. This was the first time since 1936 that Democrats posted a net gain of seats in the chamber.

== Results summary ==
↓
54	42
Democratic	Republican

Colored shading indicates party with largest share of that row.

Parties				Total
Parties	Democratic	Republican	Other	Total
Last elections (1946) Before these elections	45	51	0	96
Not up	30	33	0	63
Up	15	18	0	33
Class 2 (1942→1948)	14	18	0	32
Special: Class 3	1	0	—	1
Incumbent retired	3	5	—	8
Held by same party	3	4	—	7
Replaced by other party	▼1 Republican replaced by ▲1 Democrat		—	1
Result	4	4	0	8
Incumbent ran	12	13	—	25
Won re-election	10	5	—	17
Lost re-election	▼8 Republicans replaced by ▲8 Democrats		—	8
Lost renomination but held by same party	2	0	—	2
Result	20	5	0	25
Total elected	24	9	0	33
Net change	▲9	▼9	Steady	9
Nationwide vote	13,056,944	9,764,384	269,669	23,090,997
Share	56.55%	42.29%	1.17%	100%
Result	54	42	0	96

Source: Clerk of the U.S. House of Representatives

== Gains, losses, and holds ==
=== Retirements ===
Five Republicans and three Democrats retired instead of seeking re-election.

State	Senator	Replaced by
Kansas	Arthur Capper	Andrew Frank Schoeppel
Louisiana (special)	William C. Feazel	Russell B. Long
Maine	Wallace H. White	Margaret Chase Smith
New Jersey	Albert W. Hawkes	Robert C. Hendrickson
New Mexico	Carl Hatch	Clinton Anderson
Oklahoma	Edward H. Moore	Robert S. Kerr
South Dakota	Vera C. Bushfield	Karl Mundt
Texas	W. Lee O'Daniel	Lyndon B. Johnson

=== Defeats ===
Eight Republicans and two Democrats sought re-election but lost in the primary or general election.

State	Senator	Replaced by
Delaware	C. Douglass Buck	J. Allen Frear Jr.
Idaho	Henry Dworshak	Bert H. Miller
Illinois	C. Wayland Brooks	Paul Douglas
Iowa	George A. Wilson	Guy Gillette
Kentucky	John Sherman Cooper	Virgil Chapman
Minnesota	Joseph H. Ball	Hubert Humphrey
North Carolina	William B. Umstead	J. Melville Broughton
Tennessee	Tom Stewart	Estes Kefauver
West Virginia	Chapman Revercomb	Matthew M. Neely
Wyoming	Edward V. Robertson	Lester C. Hunt

=== Post election changes ===
State	Senator	Replaced by
Connecticut	Raymond E. Baldwin	William Benton
New York	Robert F. Wagner	John Foster Dulles
New York	John Foster Dulles	Herbert H. Lehman
North Carolina	J. Melville Broughton	Frank Porter Graham
Idaho	Bert H. Miller	Henry Dworshak
Kansas	Clyde M. Reed	Harry Darby
Kentucky	Alben W. Barkley	Garrett Withers
Rhode Island	J. Howard McGrath	Edward L. Leahy

== Change in composition ==
=== Before the elections ===
		D_{1}	D_{2}	D_{3}	D_{4}	D_{5}	D_{6}	D_{7}	D_{8}
D_{18}	D_{17}	D_{16}	D_{15}	D_{14}	D_{13}	D_{12}	D_{11}	D_{10}	D_{9}
D_{19}	D_{20}	D_{21}	D_{22}	D_{23}	D_{24}	D_{25}	D_{26}	D_{27}	D_{28}
D_{38} Mont. Ran	D_{37} Miss. Ran	D_{36} La. (sp); Retired	D_{35} La. (reg); Ran	D_{34} Ga. Ran	D_{33} Colo. Ran	D_{32} Ark. Ran	D_{31} Ala. Ran	D_{30}	D_{29}
D_{39} N.M. Retired	D_{40} N.C. (sp); N.C. (reg); Ran	D_{41} R.I. Ran	D_{42} S.C. Ran	D_{43} Tenn. Ran	D_{44} Texas; Retired	D_{45} Va. Ran	R_{51} Wyo. Ran	R_{50} W.Va. Ran	R_{49} S.D. Retired
Majority →									R_{49} S.D. Retired
R_{39} Ky. Ran	R_{40} Maine; Retired	R_{41} Mass. Ran	R_{42} Mich. Ran	R_{43} Minn. Ran	R_{44} Neb. Ran	R_{45} N.H. Ran	R_{46} N.J. Retired	R_{47} Okla. Retired	R_{48} Ore. Ran
R_{38} Kan. Retired	R_{37} Iowa; Ran	R_{36} Ill. Ran	R_{35} Idaho; Ran	R_{34} Del. Ran	R_{33}	R_{32}	R_{31}	R_{30}	R_{29}
R_{19}	R_{20}	R_{21}	R_{22}	R_{23}	R_{24}	R_{25}	R_{26}	R_{27}	R_{28}
R_{18}	R_{17}	R_{16}	R_{15}	R_{14}	R_{13}	R_{12}	R_{11}	R_{10}	R_{9}
		R_{1}	R_{2}	R_{3}	R_{4}	R_{5}	R_{6}	R_{7}	R_{8}

=== Election results ===
		D_{1}	D_{2}	D_{3}	D_{4}	D_{5}	D_{6}	D_{7}	D_{8}
D_{18}	D_{17}	D_{16}	D_{15}	D_{14}	D_{13}	D_{12}	D_{11}	D_{10}	D_{9}
D_{19}	D_{20}	D_{21}	D_{22}	D_{23}	D_{24}	D_{25}	D_{26}	D_{27}	D_{28}
D_{38} Mont. Re-elected	D_{37} Miss. Re-elected	D_{36} La. (sp); Hold	D_{35} La. (reg); Re-elected	D_{34} Ga. Re-elected	D_{33} Colo. Re-elected	D_{32} Ark. Re-elected	D_{31} Ala. Re-elected	D_{30}	D_{29}
D_{39} N.M. Hold	D_{40} N.C. (sp); N.C. (reg); Hold	D_{41} R.I. Re-elected	D_{42} S.C. Re-elected	D_{43} Tenn. Hold	D_{44} Texas; Hold	D_{45} Va. Re-elected	D_{46} Del. Gain	D_{47} Idaho; Gain	D_{48} Ill. Gain
Majority →									D_{49} Iowa; Gain
R_{39} N.H. Re-elected	R_{40} N.J. Hold	R_{41} Ore. Re-elected	R_{42} S.D. Hold	D_{54} Wyo. Gain	D_{53} W.Va. Gain	D_{52} Okla. Gain	D_{51} Minn. Gain	D_{50} Ky. Gain	D_{49} Iowa; Gain
R_{38} Neb. Re-elected	R_{37} Mich. Re-elected	R_{36} Mass. Re-elected	R_{35} Maine; Hold	R_{34} Kan. Hold	R_{33}	R_{32}	R_{31}	R_{30}	R_{29}
R_{19}	R_{20}	R_{21}	R_{22}	R_{23}	R_{24}	R_{25}	R_{26}	R_{27}	R_{28}
R_{18}	R_{17}	R_{16}	R_{15}	R_{14}	R_{13}	R_{12}	R_{11}	R_{10}	R_{9}
		R_{1}	R_{2}	R_{3}	R_{4}	R_{5}	R_{6}	R_{7}	R_{8}

Key:	D_{#} / Democratic; R_{#} / Republican

== Race summaries ==
=== Special elections during the 80th Congress ===
In these special elections, the winner was seated during 1948 or before January 3, 1949; ordered by election date.

State	Incumbent			Results	Candidates
State	Senator	Party	Electoral history	Results	Candidates
Louisiana (Class 3)	William C. Feazel	Democratic	1948 (Appointed)	Interim appointee retired. Winner elected November 2, 1948. Democratic hold.	▌ ✓ Russell B. Long (Democratic) 74.9%; ▌Clem S. Clarke (Republican) 25.1%
North Carolina (Class 2)	William B. Umstead	Democratic	1946 (Appointed)	Interim appointee lost nomination. Winner elected November 2, 1948. Democratic hold. Winner also elected to the next full term.	▌ ✓ J. Melville Broughton (Democratic); Unopposed

=== Elections leading to the next Congress ===
In these general elections, the winners were elected for the term beginning January 3, 1949; ordered by state.

All of the elections involved the Class 2 seats.

State	Incumbent			Results	Candidates
State	Senator	Party	Electoral history	Results	Candidates
Alabama	John Sparkman	Democratic	1946 (special)	Incumbent re-elected.	▌ ✓ John Sparkman (Democratic) 84.0%; ▌Paul G. Parsons (Republican) 16.0%
Arkansas	John L. McClellan	Democratic	1942	Incumbent re-elected.	▌ ✓ John L. McClellan (Democratic) 93.3%; ▌R. Walter Tucker (Independent) 6.7%
Colorado	Edwin C. Johnson	Democratic	1936; 1942	Incumbent re-elected.	▌ ✓ Edwin C. Johnson (Democratic) 66.8%; ▌Will Nicholson (Republican) 32.4%
Delaware	C. Douglass Buck	Republican	1942	Incumbent lost re-election. New senator elected. Democratic gain.	▌ ✓ J. Allen Frear Jr. (Democratic) 50.9%; ▌C. Douglass Buck (Republican) 48.3%
Georgia	Richard Russell Jr.	Democratic	1932 (special); 1936; 1942	Incumbent re-elected.	▌ ✓ Richard Russell Jr. (Democratic); Unopposed
Idaho	Henry Dworshak	Republican	1946 (special)	Incumbent lost re-election. New senator elected. Democratic gain.	▌ ✓ Bert H. Miller (Democratic) 50.0%; ▌Henry Dworshak (Republican) 48.5%
Illinois	C. Wayland Brooks	Republican	1940 (special); 1942	Incumbent lost re-election. New senator elected. Democratic gain.	▌ ✓ Paul Douglas (Democratic) 55.1%; ▌C. Wayland Brooks (Republican) 44.6%
Iowa	George A. Wilson	Republican	1942	Incumbent lost re-election. New senator elected. Democratic gain.	▌ ✓ Guy Gillette (Democratic) 57.8%; ▌George A. Wilson (Republican) 41.6%
Kansas	Arthur Capper	Republican	1918; 1924; 1930; 1936; 1942	Incumbent retired. New senator elected. Republican hold.	▌ ✓ Andrew Frank Schoeppel (Republican) 54.9%; ▌George McGill (Democratic) 42.7%
Kentucky	John Sherman Cooper	Republican	1946 (special)	Incumbent lost re-election. New senator elected. Democratic gain.	▌ ✓ Virgil Chapman (Democratic) 51.4%; ▌John Sherman Cooper (Republican) 48.3%
Louisiana	Allen J. Ellender	Democratic	1936; 1942	Incumbent re-elected.	▌ ✓ Allen J. Ellender (Democratic); Unopposed
Maine	Wallace H. White	Republican	1930; 1936; 1942	Incumbent retired. New senator elected. Republican hold.	▌ ✓ Margaret Chase Smith (Republican) 71.3%; ▌Adrian H. Scolten (Democratic) 28.7%
Massachusetts	Leverett Saltonstall	Republican	1944 (special)	Incumbent re-elected.	▌ ✓ Leverett Saltonstall (Republican) 53.0%; ▌John I. Fitzgerald (Democratic) 46.4%
Michigan	Homer S. Ferguson	Republican	1942	Incumbent re-elected.	▌ ✓ Homer S. Ferguson (Republican) 50.7%; ▌Frank Eugene Hook (Democratic) 48.5%
Minnesota	Joseph H. Ball	Republican	1940 (Appointed); 1942 (Retired); 1942	Incumbent lost re-election. New senator elected. Democratic–Farmer–Labor gain.	▌ ✓ Hubert Humphrey (DFL) 59.9%; ▌Joseph H. Ball (Republican) 39.7%
Mississippi	James Eastland	Democratic	1941 (Appointed); 1941 (Retired); 1942	Incumbent re-elected.	▌ ✓ James Eastland (Democratic); Unopposed
Montana	James E. Murray	Democratic	1934 (special); 1936; 1942	Incumbent re-elected.	▌ ✓ James E. Murray (Democratic) 56.7%; ▌Tom J. Davis (Republican) 42.7%
Nebraska	Kenneth S. Wherry	Republican	1942	Incumbent re-elected.	▌ ✓ Kenneth S. Wherry (Republican) 56.7%; ▌Terry Carpenter (Democratic) 43.3%
New Hampshire	Styles Bridges	Republican	1936; 1942	Incumbent re-elected.	▌ ✓ Styles Bridges (Republican) 58.1%; ▌Alfred E. Fortin (Democratic) 41.2%
New Jersey	Albert W. Hawkes	Republican	1942	Incumbent retired. New senator elected. Republican hold.	▌ ✓ Robert C. Hendrickson (Republican) 50.0%; ▌Archibald S. Alexander (Democratic) 47.3%
New Mexico	Carl Hatch	Democratic	1933 (Appointed); 1934 (special); 1936; 1942	Incumbent retired. New senator elected. Democratic hold.	▌ ✓ Clinton Anderson (Democratic) 57.2%; ▌Patrick J. Hurley (Republican) 42.4%
North Carolina	William B. Umstead	Democratic	1946 (Appointed)	Interim appointee lost nomination. New senator elected. Democratic hold. Winner also elected to finish the term, see above.	▌ ✓ J. Melville Broughton (Democratic) 70.7%; ▌John A. Wilkinson (Republican) 28.8%
Oklahoma	Edward H. Moore	Republican	1942	Incumbent retired. New senator elected. Democratic gain.	▌ ✓ Robert S. Kerr (Democratic) 62.3%; ▌Ross Rizley (Republican) 37.4%
Oregon	Guy Cordon	Republican	1944 (Appointed); 1944 (special)	Incumbent re-elected.	▌ ✓ Guy Cordon (Republican) 60.0%; ▌Manley J. Wilson (Democratic) 40.0%
Rhode Island	Theodore F. Green	Democratic	1936; 1942	Incumbent re-elected.	▌ ✓ Theodore F. Green (Democratic) 59.3%; ▌Thomas P. Hazard (Republican) 40.7%
South Carolina	Burnet R. Maybank	Democratic	1941 (special); 1942	Incumbent re-elected.	▌ ✓ Burnet R. Maybank (Democratic); Unopposed
South Dakota	Vera C. Bushfield	Republican	1948 (Appointed)	Interim appointee retired. New senator elected. Republican hold. Incumbent resigned December 26, 1948, and winner appointed December 31 to finish the term.	▌ ✓ Karl Mundt (Republican) 59.3%; ▌John A. Engel (Democratic) 40.7%
Tennessee	Tom Stewart	Democratic	1938 (special)	Incumbent lost re-nomination. New senator elected. Democratic hold.	▌ ✓ Estes Kefauver (Democratic) 65.3%; ▌B. Carroll Reece (Republican) 33.5%
Texas	W. Lee O'Daniel	Democratic	1941 (special); 1942	Incumbent retired. New senator elected. Democratic hold.	▌ ✓ Lyndon B. Johnson (Democratic) 66.2%; ▌Homa J. Porter (Republican) 32.9%; ▌Samuel N. Morris (Prohibition) 0.8%
Virginia	A. Willis Robertson	Democratic	1946 (special)	Incumbent re-elected.	▌ ✓ A. Willis Robertson (Democratic) 65.6%; ▌Robert H. Woods (Republican) 30.8%
West Virginia	Chapman Revercomb	Republican	1942	Incumbent lost re-election. New senator elected. Democratic gain.	▌ ✓ Matthew M. Neely (Democratic) 57.0%; ▌Chapman Revercomb (Republican) 43.0%
Wyoming	Edward V. Robertson	Republican	1942	Incumbent lost re-election. New senator elected. Democratic gain.	▌ ✓ Lester C. Hunt (Democratic) 57.1%; ▌Edward V. Robertson (Republican) 42.9%

== Closest races ==
Six races had a margin of victory under 10%:

State	Party of winner	Margin
Idaho	Democratic (flip)	1.5%
Michigan	Republican	2.2%
Delaware	Democratic (flip)	2.6%
New Jersey	Republican	2.7%
Kentucky	Democratic (flip)	3.1%
Massachusetts	Republican	6.6%

Wyoming was the tipping point state, with a margin of 14.2%.

== Alabama ==
1948 United States Senate election in Alabama
- November 2, 1948
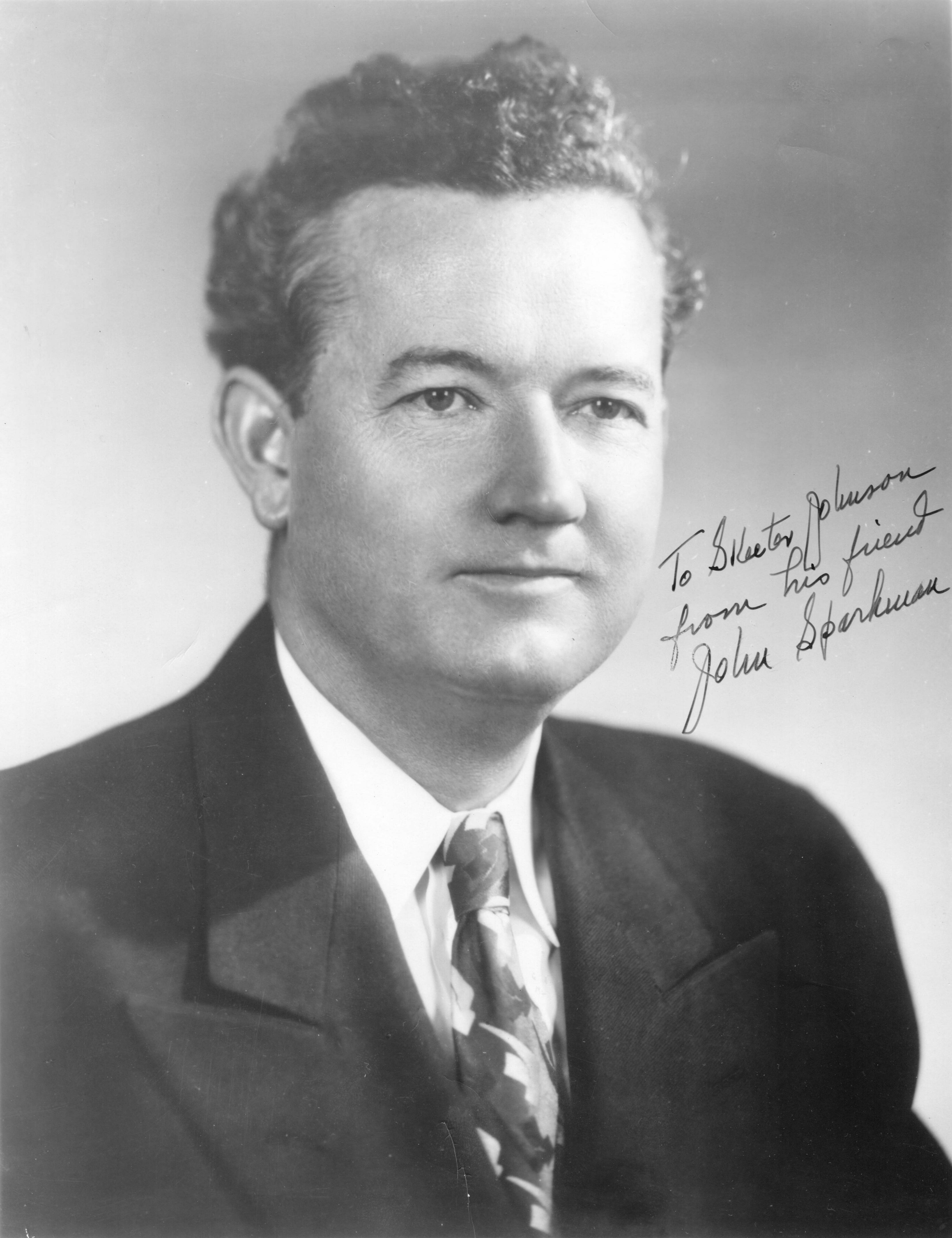

Nominee	John Sparkman	Paul G. Parsons
Party	Democratic	Republican
Popular vote	185,534	35,341
Percentage	84.00%	16.00%
- County results Sparkman: 50–60% 60–70% 70–80% 80–90% 90–100% Parsons: 50–60%
U.S. senator before election
John Sparkman
Democratic
Elected U.S. Senator
John Sparkman
Democratic

Alabama election
Party	Candidate	Votes	%
Democratic	John Sparkman (incumbent)	185,534	84.00%
Republican	Paul G. Parsons	35,341	16.00%
Majority		150,193	68.00%
Turnout		220,875	
Democratic hold			

== Arkansas ==
Senator John L. McClellan

Arkansas election
Party	Candidate	Votes	%
Democratic	John L. McClellan (incumbent)	216,401	93.19%
Independent	R. Walter Tucker	15,821	6.81%
Turnout		232,222	
Democratic hold			

== Colorado ==
1948 United States Senate election in Colorado
- November 2, 1948
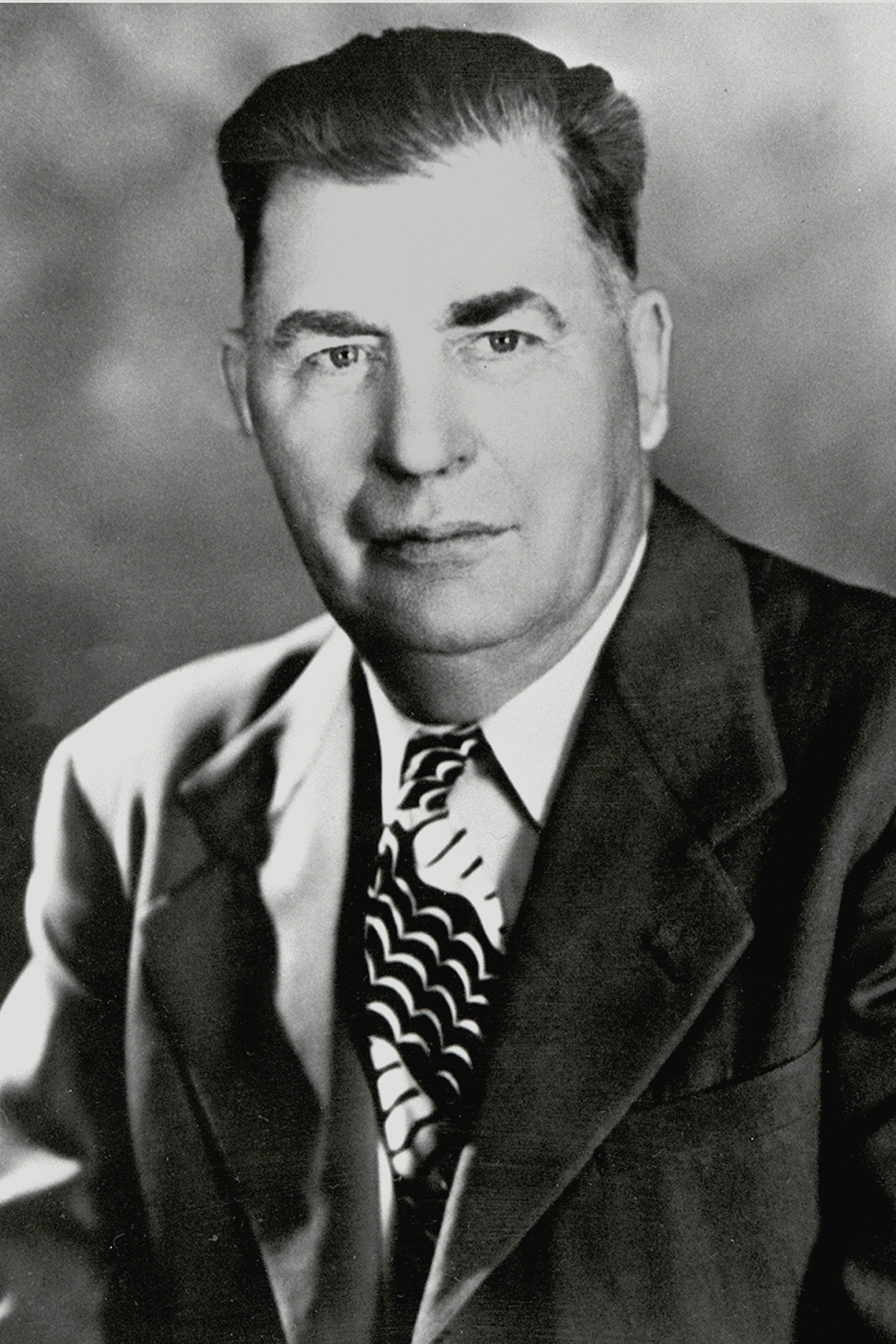

Nominee	Ed Johnson	Will Nicholson
Party	Democratic	Republican
Popular vote	340,719	165,059
Percentage	66.79%	32.36%
- County results Johnson: 50–60% 60–70% 70–80%
U.S. senator before election
Edwin C. Johnson
Democratic
Elected U.S. Senator
Edwin C. Johnson
Democratic

Colorado election
Party	Candidate	Votes	%
Democratic	Edwin C. Johnson (incumbent)	340,719	66.79%
Republican	Will Nicholson	165,069	32.36%
Progressive	Joe Gurule	2,981	0.58%
Socialist	Carle Whithead	1,352	0.27%
Majority		175,650	34.43%
Turnout		510,121	
Democratic hold			

== Delaware ==
1948 United States Senate election in Delaware
- November 2, 1948
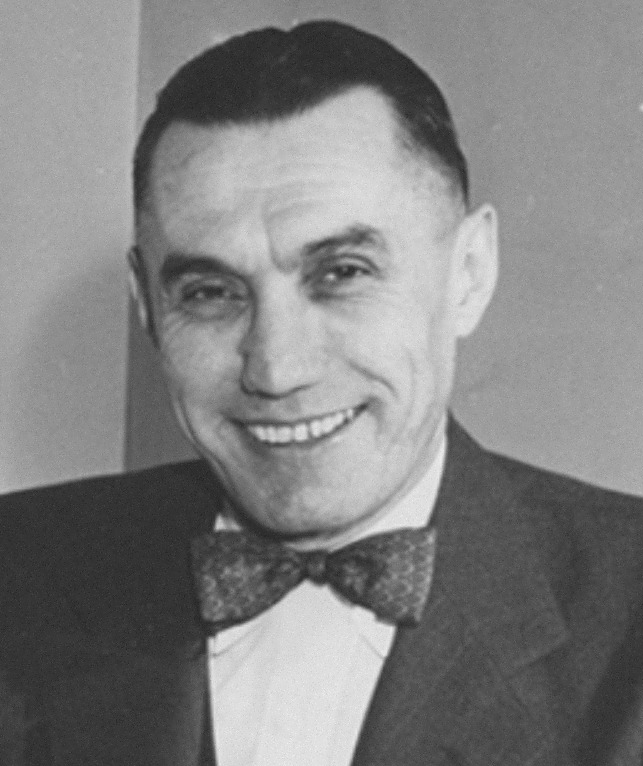

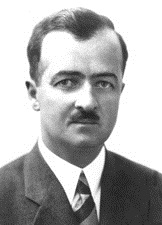
Nominee	J. Allen Frear Jr.	C. Douglass Buck
Party	Democratic	Republican
Popular vote	71,888	68,246
Percentage	50.85%	48.28%
- County results Frear: 50–60% Buck: 50–60%
U.S. senator before election
C. Douglass Buck
Republican
Elected U.S. Senator
J. Allen Frear Jr.
Democratic

Delaware election
Party	Candidate	Votes	%
Democratic	J. Allen Frear Jr.	71,888	50.85%
Republican	C. Douglass Buck (incumbent)	68,246	48.28%
Majority		3,642	2.57%
Turnout		141,362	
Democratic gain from Republican			

== Georgia ==
1948 U.S. Senate Democratic primary in Georgia
- September 8, 1948
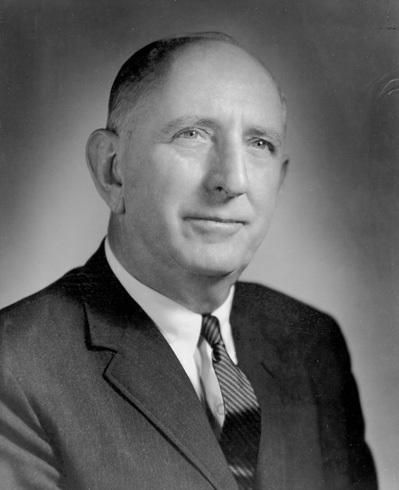
Nominee	Richard Russell Jr.
Party	Democratic
Electoral vote	410
Popular vote	703,048
Percentage	99.98%
- County results Russell: >90%
U.S. senator before election
Richard Russell Jr.
Democratic
Elected U.S. Senator
Richard Russell Jr.
Democratic

Georgia election
Party	Candidate	Votes	%
Democratic	Richard Russell Jr. (incumbent)	362,104	99.89%
Write-in	Larkin Marshall	388	0.11%
Write-in	Ellis Arnall	9	0.00%
Write-in	Roy Harris	2	0.00%
Write-in	Harry Sommers	1	0.00%
Majority		361,716	99.78%
Turnout		362,504	
Democratic hold			

== Idaho ==
1948 United States Senate election in Idaho
- November 2, 1948
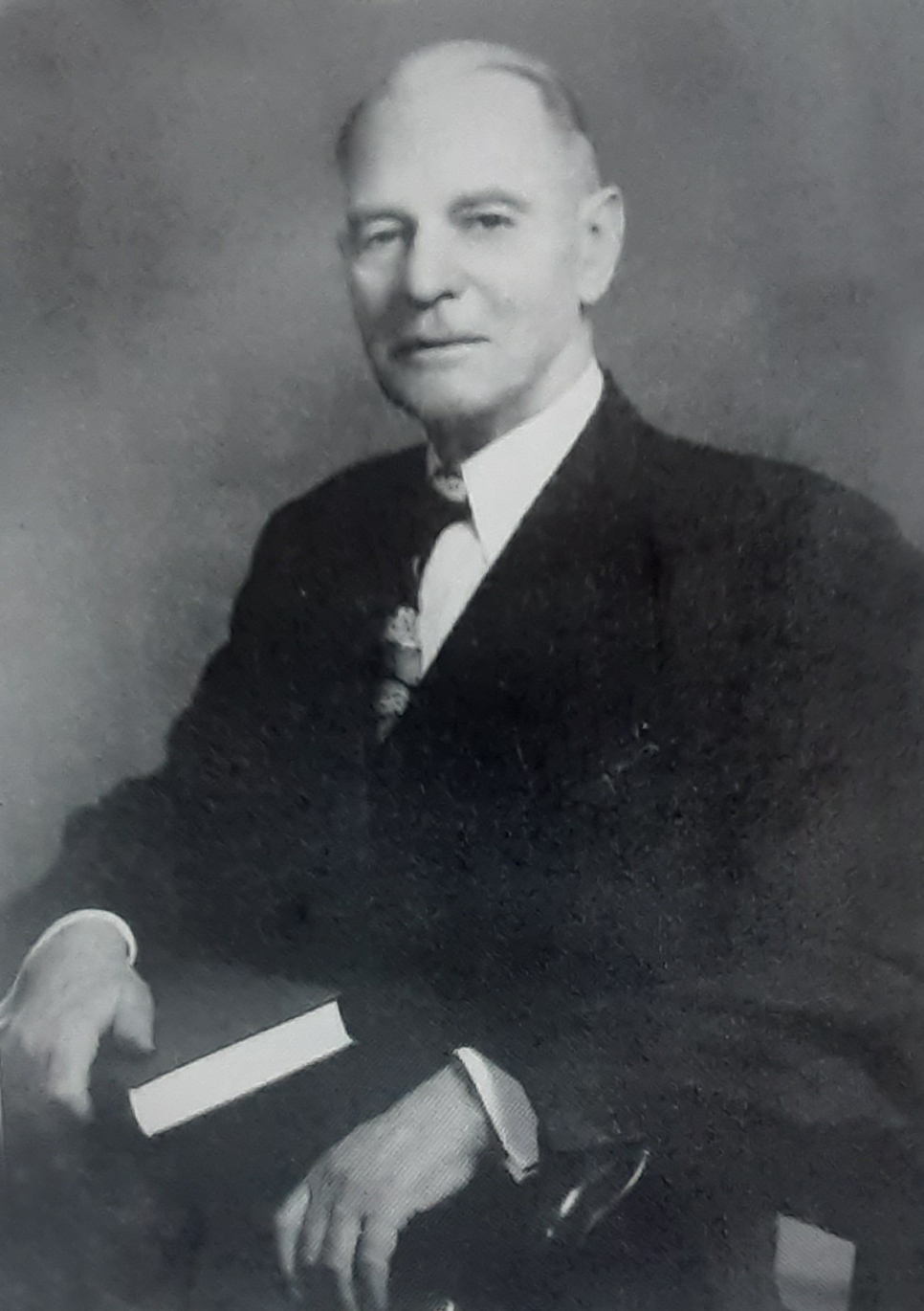

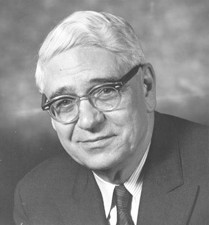
Nominee	Bert H. Miller	Henry Dworshak
Party	Democratic	Republican
Popular vote	107,000	103,868
Percentage	49.96%	48.49%
- County results Miller: 40–50% 50–60% 60–70% 70–80% Dworshak: 40–50% 50–60% 60–70%
U.S. senator before election
Henry Dworshak
Republican
Elected U.S. Senator
Bert H. Miller
Democratic

Democrat Bert H. Miller defeated incumbent Republican Henry Dworshak. As of 2024, this remains the only time that a Democrat won Idaho's Class 2 Senate seat. Dworshak was appointed back to this seat in October 1949 after Miller died earlier that month and served until he himself died in 1962.

Idaho election
Party	Candidate	Votes	%
Democratic	Bert H. Miller	107,000	49.96%
Republican	Henry Dworshak (incumbent)	103,868	48.49%
Progressive	John Derr	3,154	1.47%
Socialist	Paul Wengert	166	0.08%
Majority		3,132	1.47%
Turnout		214,188	
Democratic gain from Republican			

== Illinois ==
1948 United States Senate election in Illinois
- November 2, 1948
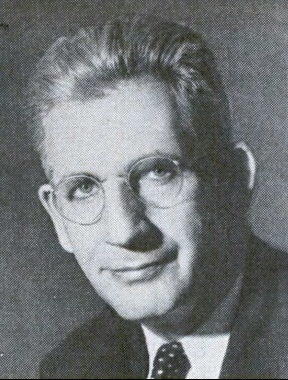

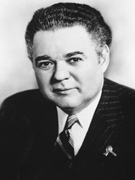
Nominee	Paul Douglas	Charles W. Brooks
Party	Democratic	Republican
Popular vote	2,147,754	1,740,026
Percentage	55.07%	44.61%
- County results Douglas: 40–50% 50–60% 60–70% Tie: 40–50% Brooks: 40–50% 50–60% 60–70% 70–80%
U.S. senator before election
Charles W. Brooks
Republican
Elected U.S. Senator
Paul Douglas
Democratic

Illinois election
Party	Candidate	Votes	%
Democratic	Paul Douglas	2,147,754	55.07%
Republican	Charles W. Brooks (incumbent)	1,740,026	44.61%
Prohibition	Enoch A. Holtwick	9,784	0.25%
Socialist Labor	Frank Schnur	2,693	0.07%
None	Write-in	28	0.00%
Majority		407,728	10.46%
Turnout		3,900,285	
Democratic gain from Republican			

== Iowa ==
1948 United States Senate election in Iowa
- November 2, 1948
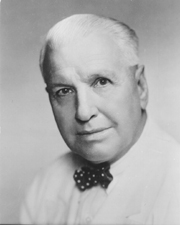

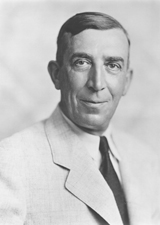
Nominee	Guy Gillette	George A. Wilson
Party	Democratic	Republican
Popular vote	578,226	415,778
Percentage	57.80%	41.56%
- County results Gillette: 40–50% 50–60% 60–70% Wilson: 50–60%
U.S. senator before election
George A. Wilson
Republican
Elected U.S. Senator
Guy Gillette
Democratic

Iowa election
Party	Candidate	Votes	%
Democratic	Guy Gillette	578,226	57.80%
Republican	George A. Wilson (incumbent)	415,778	41.56%
Progressive	Seymour Pitcher	3,387	0.34%
Prohibition	Z. Everett Kellum	2,580	0.26%
Socialist	Hugo Bockewitz	441	0.04%
Majority		162,448	16.24%
Turnout		1,000,412	
Democratic gain from Republican			

== Kansas ==
1948 United States Senate election in Kansas
- November 2, 1948
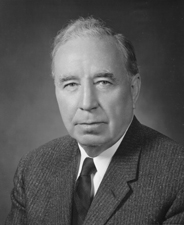

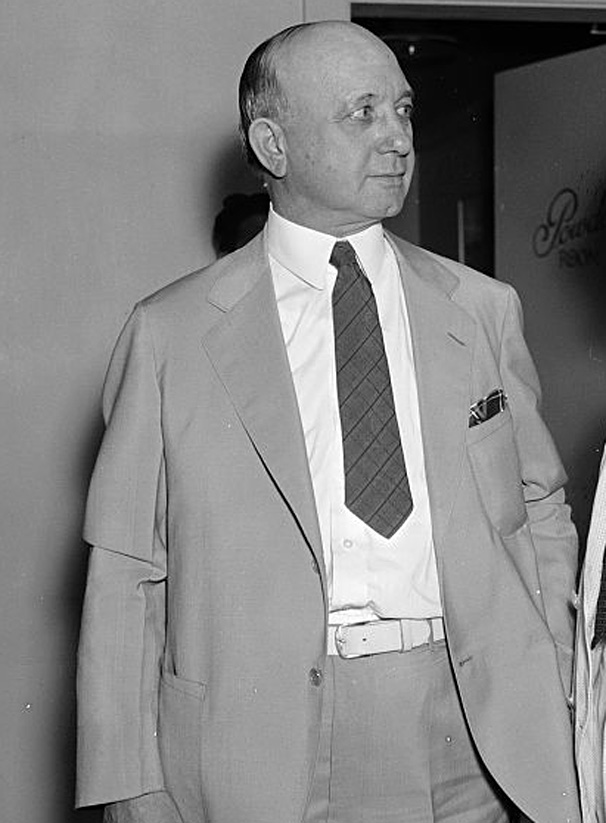
Nominee	Andrew Frank Schoeppel	George McGill
Party	Republican	Democratic
Popular vote	393,412	305,987
Percentage	54.92%	42.72%
- County results Schoeppel: 40–50% 50–60% 60–70% 70–80% McGill: 40–50% 50–60%
U.S. senator before election
Arthur Capper
Republican
Elected U.S. Senator
Andrew Frank Schoeppel
Republican

Kansas election
Party	Candidate	Votes	%
Republican	Andrew Frank Schoeppel	393,412	54.92%
Democratic	George McGill	305,987	42.72%
Prohibition	C. Floyd Hester	16,943	2.37%
Majority		87,425	12.20%
Turnout		716,342	
Republican hold			

== Kentucky ==
1948 United States Senate election in Kentucky
- November 2, 1948
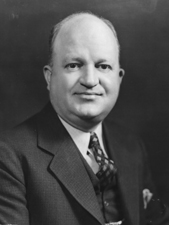

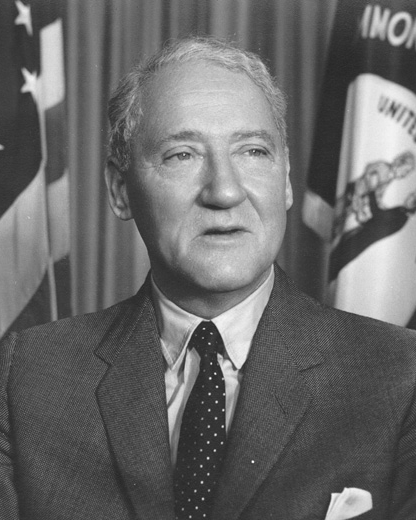
Nominee	Virgil Chapman	John Sherman Cooper
Party	Democratic	Republican
Popular vote	408,256	383,776
Percentage	51.39%	48.31%
- County results Chapman: 50–60% 60–70% 70–80% 80–90% Cooper: 40–50% 50–60% 60–70% 70–80% 80–90%
U.S. senator before election
John Sherman Cooper
Republican
Elected U.S. Senator
Virgil Chapman
Democratic

Kentucky election
Party	Candidate	Votes	%
Democratic	Virgil Chapman	408,256	51.39%
Republican	John Sherman Cooper (incumbent)	383,776	48.31%
Socialist	W. A. Standefur	1,232	0.16%
Progressive	H. G. Stanfield	924	0.12%
Socialist Labor	David R. Cox	254	0.03%
Write-in	John Y. Brown	26	0.00%
Write-in	O. G. Gaines	1	0.00%
Majority		24,480	3.08%
Turnout		794,469	
Democratic gain from Republican			

== Louisiana ==
=== Louisiana (regular) ===
1948 Democratic Senate primary election in Louisiana
- August 31, 1948
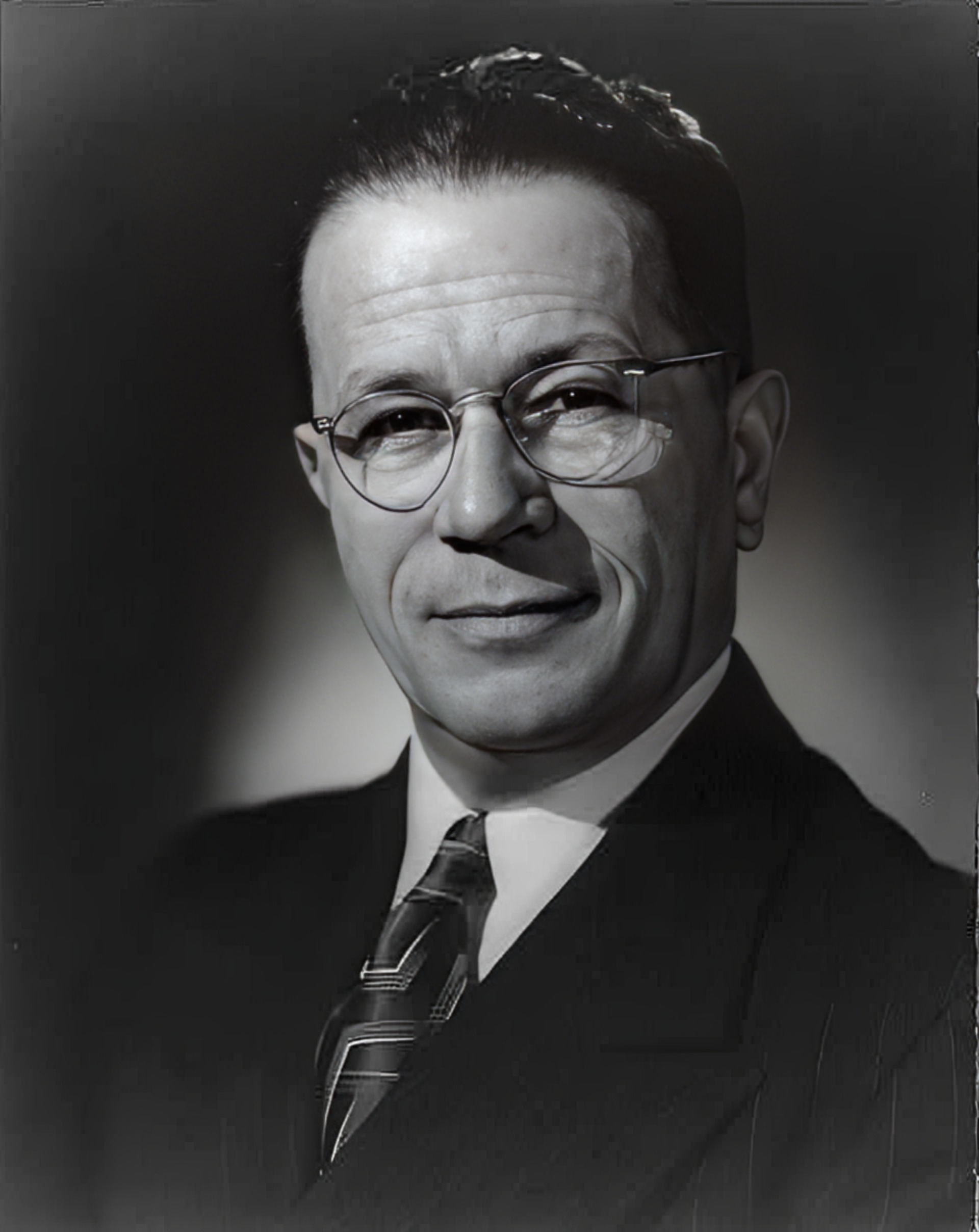

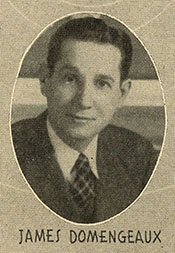

Nominee	Allen Ellender	James Domengeaux	Charles S. Gerth
Party	Democratic	Democratic	Democratic
Popular vote	284,293	119,459	57,047
Percentage	61.70%	25.92%	12.38%
- Parish results Ellender: 40–50% 50–60% 60–70% 70–80% >90%
U.S. senator before election
Allen Ellender
Democratic
Elected U.S. Senator
Allen Ellender
Democratic

Louisiana election
Party	Candidate	Votes	%
Democratic	Allen J. Ellender (incumbent)	330,115	100.00%
Independent	Maurice Eugene Clark	9	0.00%
Majority		330,106	100.00%
Turnout		330,124	
Democratic hold			

=== Louisiana (special) ===
1948 United States Senate special election in Louisiana
- November 2, 1948
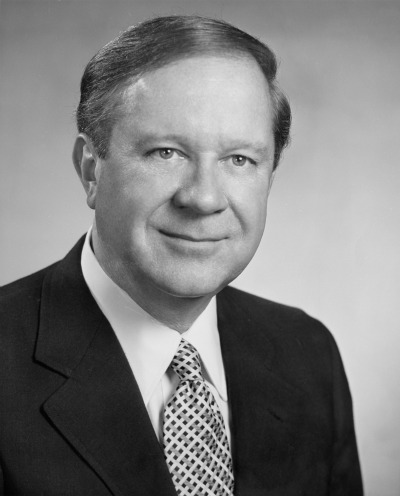
Nominee	Russell B. Long	Clem S. Clarke
Party	Democratic	Republican
Popular vote	306,336	102,331
Percentage	74.96%	25.04%
- Parish results Long: 50–60% 60–70% 70–80% 80–90% 90–100% Jenkins: 50–60%
U.S. senator before election
William C. Feazel
Democratic
Elected U.S. Senator
Russell B. Long
Democratic

1948 United States Senate special election in Louisiana
Party	Candidate	Votes	%
Democratic	Russell B. Long	306,336	74.96%
Republican	Clem S. Clarke	102,331	25.04%
Majority		204,005	49.92%
Turnout		408,667	
Democratic hold			

== Maine ==
1948 United States Senate election in Maine
- September 13, 1948
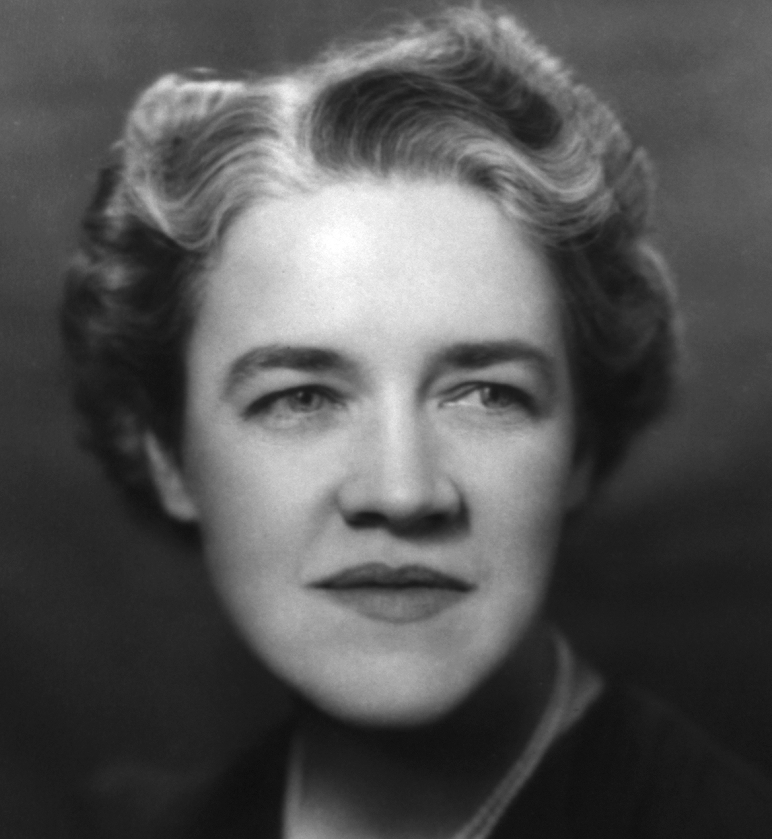

Nominee	Margaret Chase Smith	Adrian Scolten
Party	Republican	Democratic
Popular vote	159,182	64,074
Percentage	71.30%	28.70%
- County results Smith: 50–60% 60–70% 70–80% 80–90% >90%
U.S. senator before election
Wallace H. White Jr.
Republican
Elected U.S. Senator
Margaret Chase Smith
Republican

Maine election
Party	Candidate	Votes	%
Republican	Margaret Chase Smith	159,182	71.30%
Democratic	Adrian H. Scolten	64,074	28.70%
Majority		95,108	42.60%
Turnout		223,256	
Republican hold			

== Massachusetts ==
1948 United States Senate election in Massachusetts
- November 2, 1948
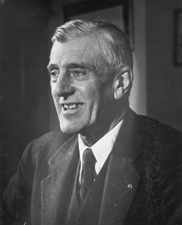

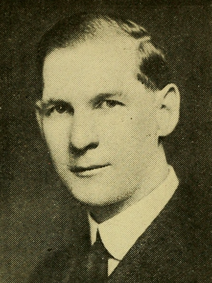
Nominee	Leverett Saltonstall	John I. Fitzgerald
Party	Republican	Democratic
Popular vote	1,088,475	954,398
Percentage	52.95%	46.43%
- Saltonstall: 50–60% 60–70% 70–80% 80–90% 90–100% Fitzgerald: 50–60% 60–70% 70–80%
Senator before election
Leverett Saltonstall
Republican
Elected Senator
Leverett Saltonstall
Republican

General election
Party	Candidate	Votes	%
Republican	Leverett Saltonstall (incumbent)	1,088,475	52.95%
Democratic	John I. Fitzgerald	954,398	46.42%
Socialist Labor	Henning A. Blomen	9,266	0.45%
Prohibition	E. Tallmadge Root	3,652	0.18%
None	Scattering	7	0.00%
Majority		134,077	6.53%
Turnout		2,055,798	
Republican hold			

== Michigan ==
1948 United States Senate election in Michigan
- November 2, 1948
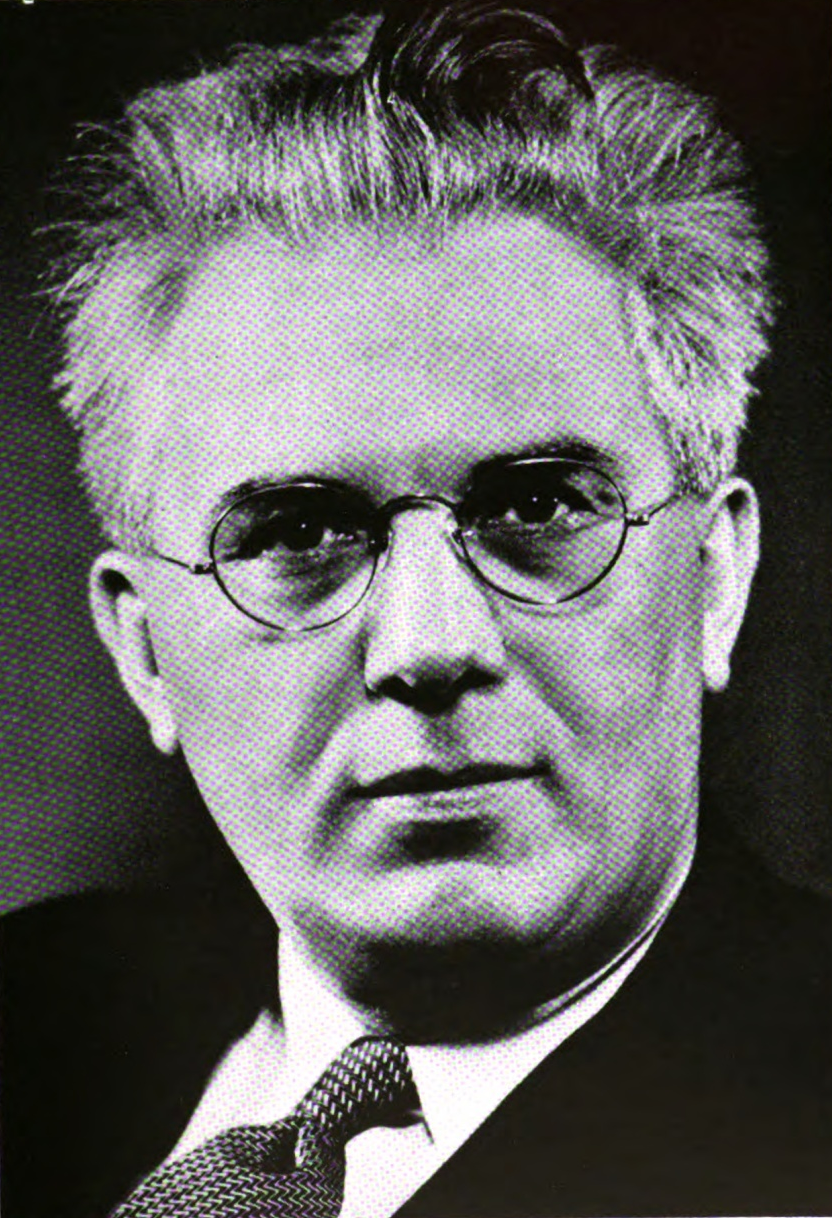

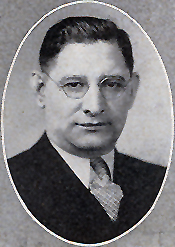
Nominee	Homer S. Ferguson	Frank E. Hook
Party	Republican	Democratic
Popular vote	1,045,156	1,000,329
Percentage	50.68%	48.51%
- County results Ferguson: 40–50% 50–60% 60–70% 70–80% 80–90% Hook: 50–60% 60–70%
U.S. senator before election
Homer S. Ferguson
Republican
Elected U.S. Senator
Homer S. Ferguson
Republican

Michigan election
Party	Candidate	Votes	%
Republican	Homer S. Ferguson (incumbent)	1,045,156	50.68%
Democratic	Frank E. Hook	1,000,329	48.51%
Prohibition	Harold A. Lindahl	12,146	0.59%
Socialist	Michael Magee	2,160	0.10%
Socialist Labor	Theos S. Grove	1,418	0.07%
Socialist Workers	Genora Dollinger	882	0.04%
None	Scattering	2.57%	0.00%
Majority		44,827	2.17%
Turnout		2,062,093	
Republican hold			

== Minnesota ==
1948 United States Senate election in Minnesota
- November 2, 1948
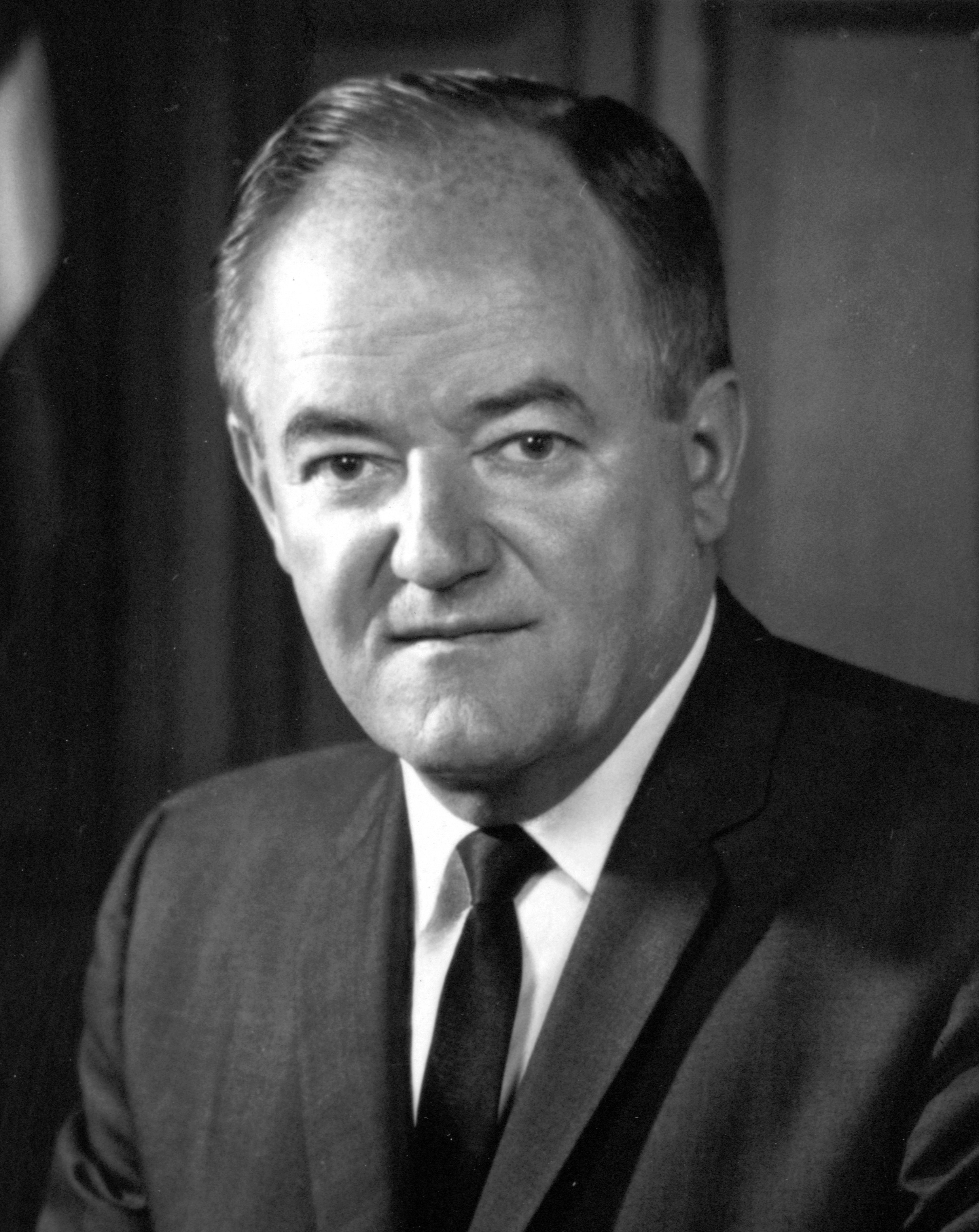

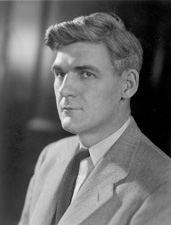
Nominee	Hubert H. Humphrey	Joseph H. Ball
Party	Democratic (DFL)	Republican
Popular vote	729,494	485,801
Percentage	59.78%	39.81%
- County results Humphrey: 50–60% 60–70% 70–80% Ball: 50–60% 60–70%
U.S. senator before election
Joseph H. Ball
Republican
Elected U.S. Senator
Hubert H. Humphrey
Democratic (DFL)

Minnesota election
Party	Candidate	Votes	%
Democratic (DFL)	Hubert Humphrey	729,494	59.78%
Republican	Joseph H. Ball (incumbent)	485,801	39.81%
Socialist Workers	Vincent R. Dunne	4,951	0.41%
None	Scattering	41.56%	0.00%
Majority		243,693	19.97%
Turnout		1,220,250	
Democratic (DFL) gain from Republican			

== Mississippi ==
Mississippi election
Party	Candidate	Votes	%
Democratic	James Eastland (incumbent)	151,478	100.00%
Democratic hold			

== Montana ==
1948 United States Senate election in Montana
- November 2, 1948
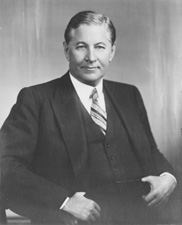

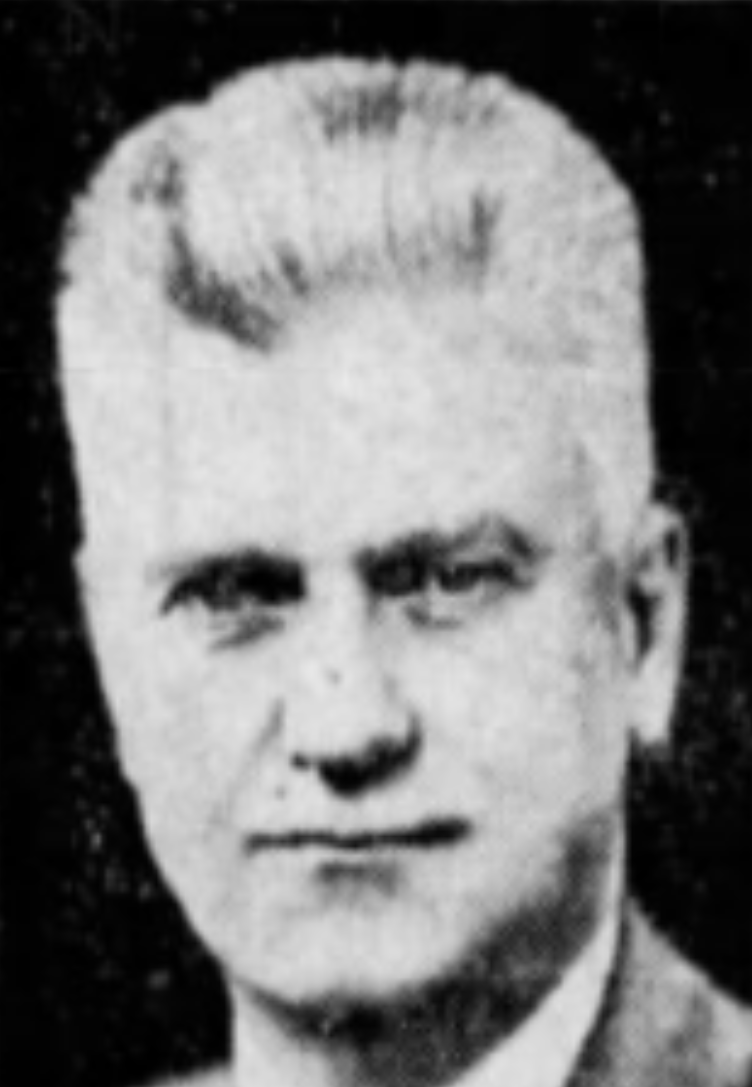
Nominee	James E. Murray	Tom J. Davis
Party	Democratic	Republican
Popular vote	125,193	94,458
Percentage	56.65%	42.74%
- County results Murray: 50–60% 60–70% Davis: 50–60% 60–70%
U.S. senator before election
James E. Murray
Democratic
Elected U.S. Senator
James E. Murray
Democratic

Incumbent United States Senator James E. Murray, who was first elected to the Senate in a special election in 1934 and was re-elected in 1936 and 1942, ran for re-election. After winning the Democratic primary, he faced Tom J. Davis, an attorney and the Republican nominee, in the general election. Following a narrow re-election in 1936, Murray significantly expanded his margin of victory and comfortably won re-election over Davis, winning his fourth term and his third full term in the Senate.

1948 United States Senate election in Montana
Party	Candidate	Votes	%
Democratic	James E. Murray (incumbent)	125,193	56.65%
Republican	Tom J. Davis	94,458	42.74%
Prohibition	C. S. Hanna	1,352	0.61%
Majority		30,735	13.91%
Turnout		221,003	
Democratic hold			

== Nebraska ==
1948 United States Senate election in Nebraska
- November 2, 1948
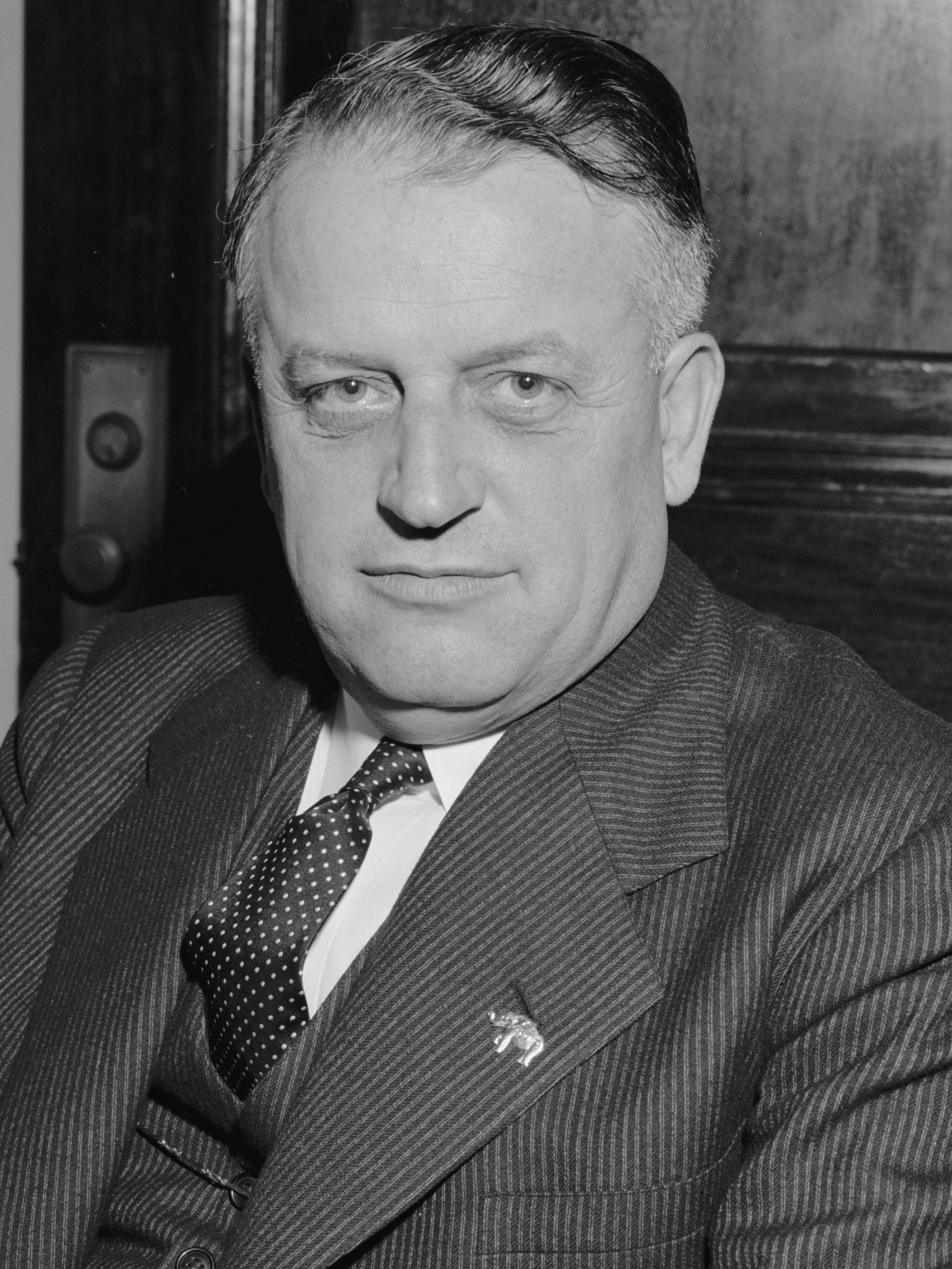

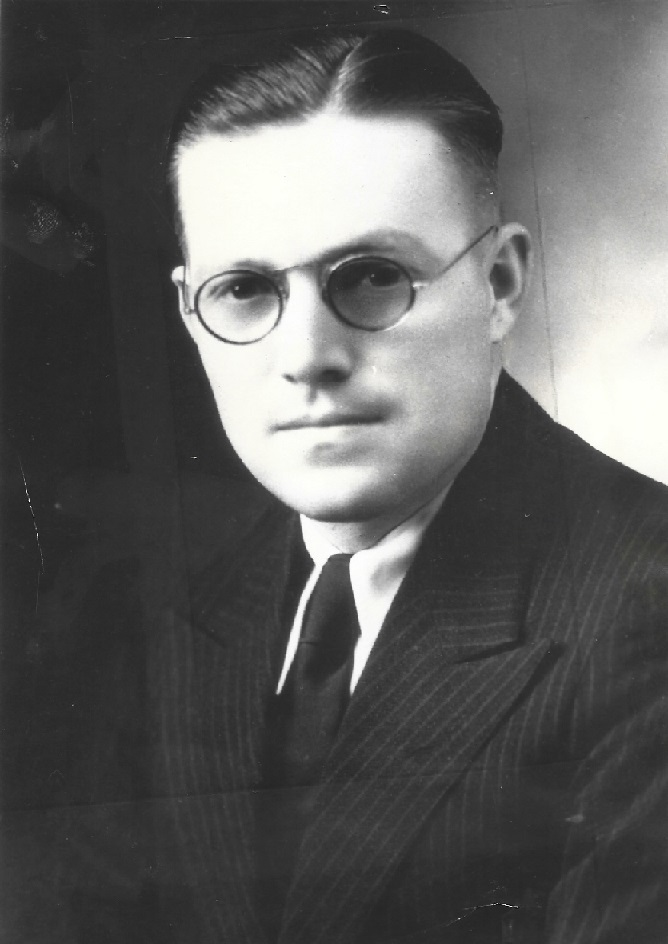
Nominee	Kenneth S. Wherry	Terry Carpenter
Party	Republican	Democratic
Popular vote	267,575	204,320
Percentage	56.67%	43.27%
- County results Wherry: 50–60% 60–70% 70–80% Carpenter: 50–60% 60–70%
U.S. senator before election
Kenneth S. Wherry
Republican
Elected U.S. Senator
Kenneth S. Wherry
Republican

Nebraska election
Party	Candidate	Votes	%
Republican	Kenneth S. Wherry (incumbent)	267,575	56.67%
Democratic	Terry Carpenter	204,320	43.27%
N/A	Scattering	261	0.06%
Majority		63,255	13.40%
Turnout		472,156	
Republican hold			

== New Hampshire ==
1948 United States Senate election in New Hampshire
- November 2, 1948
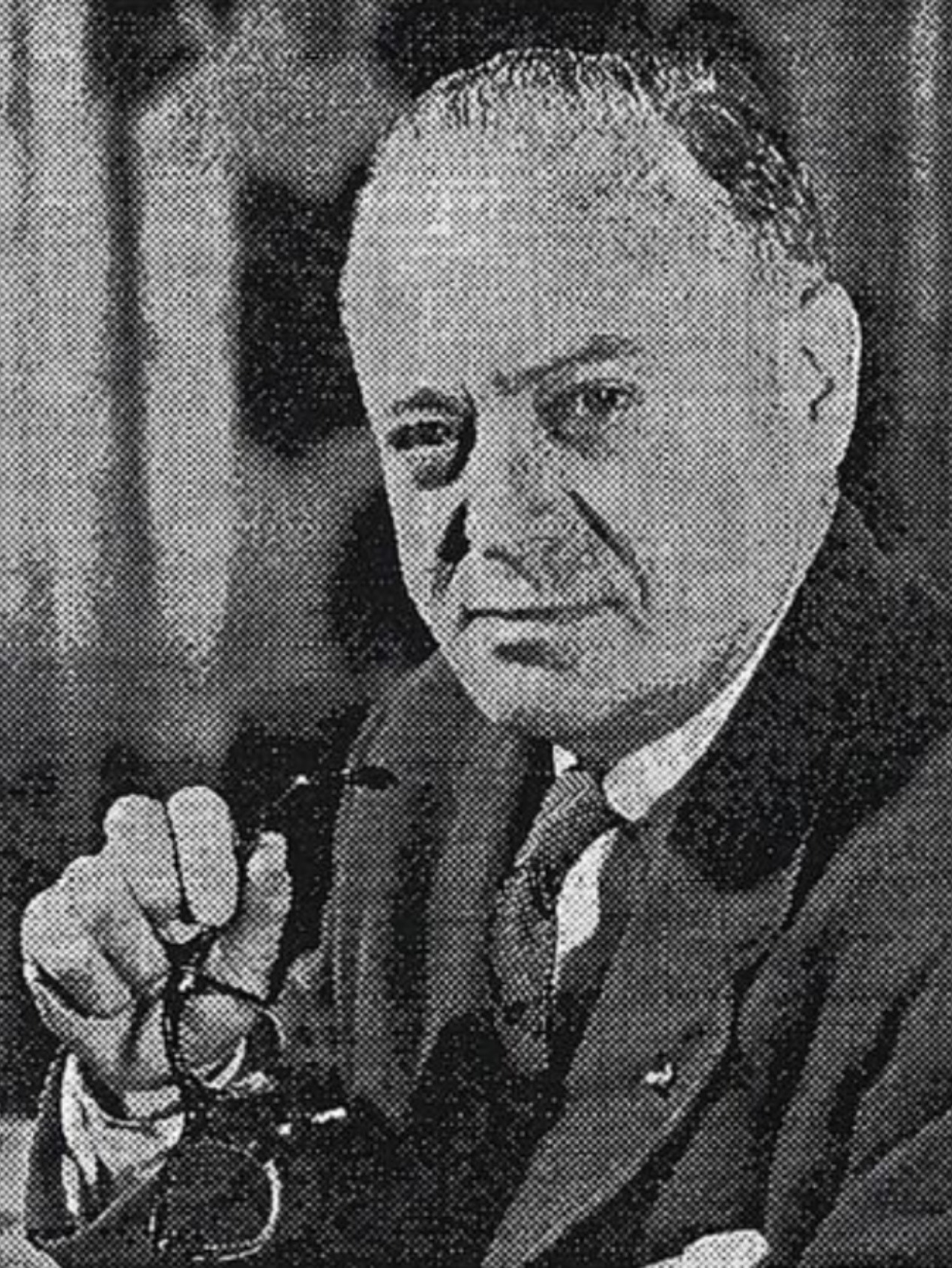

Nominee	Styles Bridges	Alfred E. Fortin
Party	Republican	Democratic
Popular vote	129,600	91,760
Percentage	58.14%	41.17%
- Bridges: 50–60% 60–70% 70–80% 80–90% 90-100% Fortin: 50–60% 60–70% 70–80%
U.S. senator before election
Styles Bridges
Republican
Elected U.S. Senator
Styles Bridges
Republican

New Hampshire election
Party	Candidate	Votes	%
Republican	Styles Bridges (incumbent)	129,600	58.14%
Democratic	Alfred E. Fortin	91,760	41.17%
Progressive	John G. Rideout	1,538	0.69%
Majority		37,840	16.97%
Turnout		222,898	
Republican hold			

== New Jersey ==
1948 United States Senate election in New Jersey
- November 2, 1948
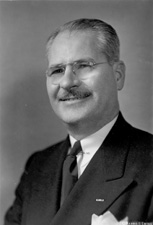
Nominee	Robert C. Hendrickson	Archibald S. Alexander
Party	Republican	Democratic
Popular vote	934,720	884,414
Percentage	49.99%	47.30%
- County results Hendrickson: 40–50% 50–60% 60–70% 70–80% Alexander: 40–50% 50–60% 60–70%
U.S. senator before election
Albert Hawkes
Republican
Elected U.S. Senator
Robert C. Hendrickson
Republican

New Jersey election
Party	Candidate	Votes	%
Republican	Robert C. Hendrickson	934,720	49.99%
Democratic	Archibald S. Alexander	884,414	47.30%
Progressive	James Imbrie	22,658	1.21%
Socialist	Rubye Smith	11,450	0.61%
Socialist Workers	George Breitman	8,076	0.43%
Prohibition	George W. Rideout	4,656	0.25%
Socialist Labor	George E. Bopp	3,908	0.21%
Majority		50,306	2.69%
Turnout		1,869,882	
Republican hold			

== New Mexico ==
1948 United States Senate election in New Mexico
- November 2, 1948
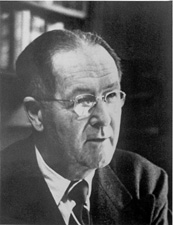

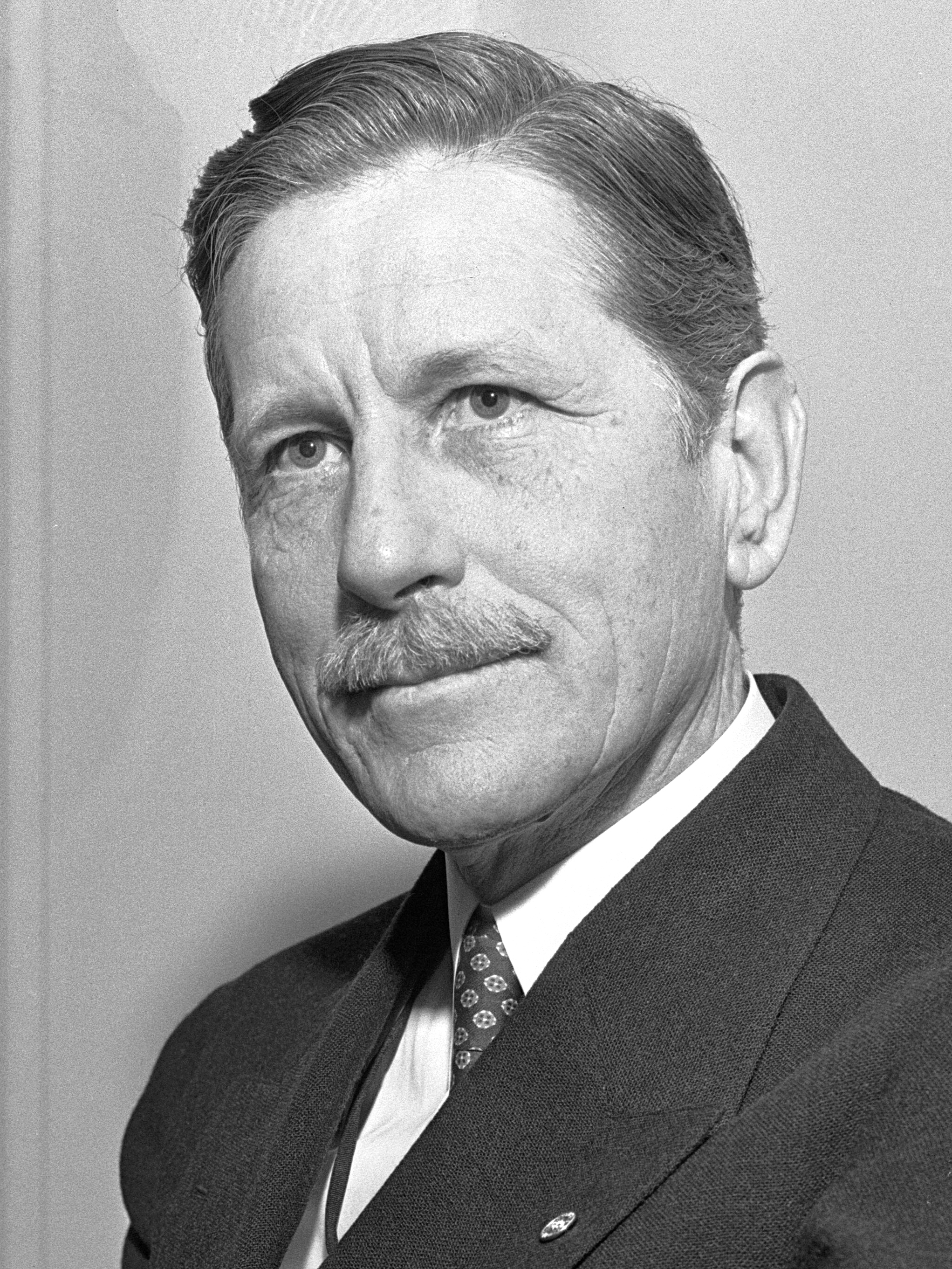
Nominee	Clinton Anderson	Patrick J. Hurley
Party	Democratic	Republican
Popular vote	108,269	80,226
Percentage	57.44%	42.40%
- County results Anderson: 50–60% 60–70% 70–80% 80–90% Hurley: 40–50% 50–60%
U.S. senator before election
Carl Hatch
Democratic
Elected U.S. Senator
Clinton Anderson
Democratic

New Mexico election
Party	Candidate	Votes	%
Democratic	Clinton Anderson	108,269	57.44%
Republican	Patrick J. Hurley	80,226	42.40%
Progressive	Brígido Provencio	705	0.37%
Majority		28,043	14.04%
Turnout		188,202	
Democratic hold			

== North Carolina ==
There were two elections to the same seat, due to the December 15, 1946 death of three-term Democrat Josiah Bailey. Democratic former Congressman William B. Umstead was appointed on December 18, 1946 to continue Bailey's term, pending a special election.

Umstead supported the conservative Taft–Hartley Act. The Democratic former Governor of North Carolina J. Melville Broughton was seen as a "rather liberal alternative" to Umstead. Broughton beat Umstead in the Democratic primaries and then won the general elections.

=== North Carolina (special) ===
North Carolina special Democratic primary election, May 29, 1948
Party	Candidate	Votes	%
Democratic	J. Melville Broughton	206,605	52.30%
Democratic	William B. Umstead (incumbent)	188,420	47.70%
Majority		18,196	4.60%

North Carolina special election, November 2, 1948
Party	Candidate	Votes	%
Democratic	J. Melville Broughton	534,917	100.00%
Democratic hold			

=== North Carolina (regular) ===
1948 United States Senate election in North Carolina
- November 2, 1948
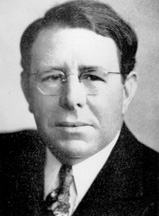

Nominee	J. Melville Broughton	John A. Wilkinson
Party	Democratic	Republican
Popular vote	540,762	220,307
Percentage	70.73%	28.81%
- County results Scott: 50–60% 60–70% 70–80% 80–90% 90–100% West: 50–60% 60–70% 70–80%
Senator before election
William B. Umstead
Democratic
Elected Senator
J. Melville Broughton
Democratic

North Carolina regular Democratic primary election, May 29, 1948
Party	Candidate	Votes	%
Democratic	J. Melville Broughton	207,981	53.10%
Democratic	William B. Umstead (incumbent)	183,865	46.90%
Majority		23,894	6.10%

North Carolina regular election, November 2, 1948
Party	Candidate	Votes	%
Democratic	J. Melville Broughton	540,762	70.73%
Republican	John A. Wilkinson	220,307	28.81%
Progressive	William T. Brown	3,490	0.46%
Majority		320,455	41.91%
Democratic hold			

Broughton was seated December 31, 1948, to finish the current term but died March 6, 1949, just after the new term began. His death led to another appointment (Democrat Frank Graham) in 1949 and subsequent special election in 1950 of Democrat Willis Smith. Smith also died during the term, leading to yet another appointment (Democrat Alton A. Lennon) and a 1954 special election (of Democrat W. Kerr Scott). In all, five senators held the seat during the 1949–1955 term.

== Oklahoma ==
1948 United States Senate election in Oklahoma
- November 2, 1948
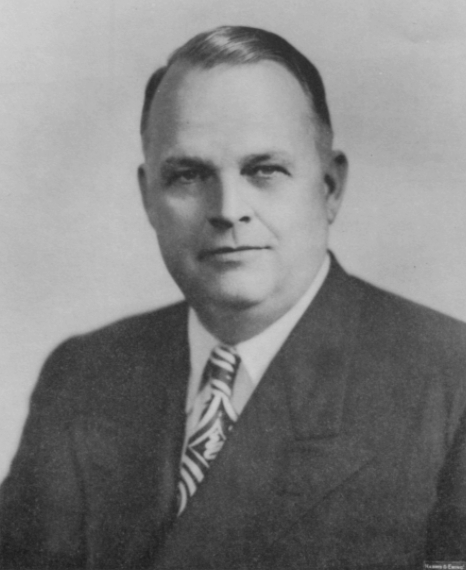

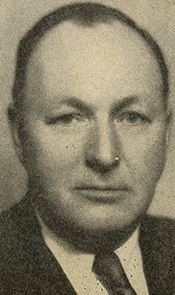
Nominee	Robert S. Kerr	Ross Rizley
Party	Democratic	Republican
Popular vote	441,654	265,169
Percentage	62.30%	37.40%
- County results Kerr: 40–50% 50–60% 60–70% 70–80% 80–90% >90% Rizley: 40–50% 50–60% 60–70%
U.S. senator before election
Edward H. Moore
Republican
Elected U.S. Senator
Robert S. Kerr
Democratic

Oklahoma election
Party	Candidate	Votes	%
Democratic	Robert S. Kerr	441,654	62.30%
Republican	Ross Rizley	265,169	37.40%
Independent	W. O. Pratt	2,108	0.30%
Majority		176,485	24.90%
Turnout		708,931	
Democratic gain from Republican			

== Oregon ==
1948 United States Senate election in Oregon
- November 2, 1948
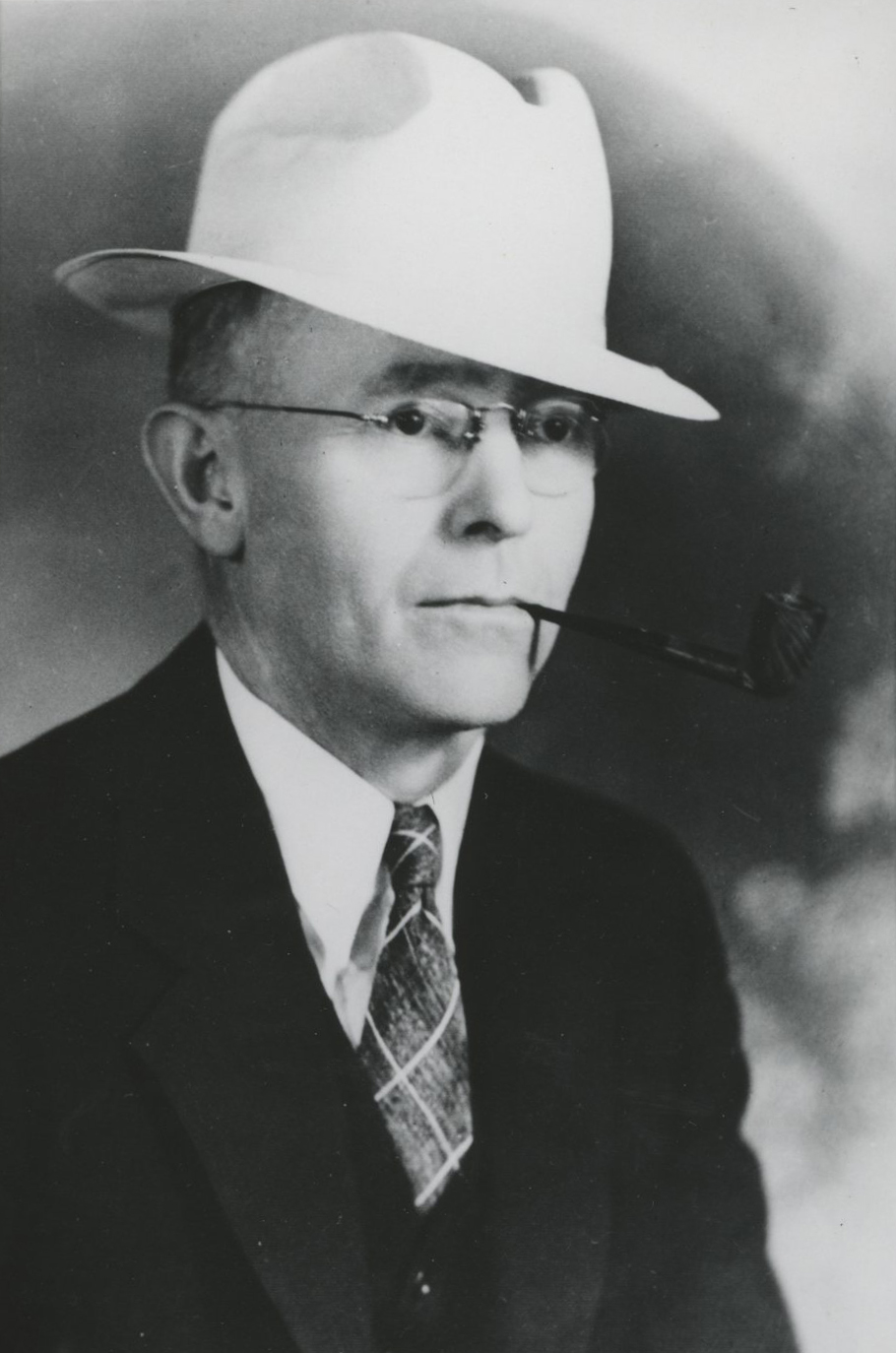
Nominee	Guy Cordon	Manley J. Wilson
Party	Republican	Democratic
Popular vote	299,295	199,275
Percentage	60.03%	39.97%
- County results Cordon: 50–60% 60–70% 70–80% Wilson: 50–60%
Senator before election
Guy Cordon
Republican
Elected Senator
Guy Cordon
Republican

Oregon election
Party	Candidate	Votes	%
Republican	Guy Cordon (incumbent)	299,295	60.03%
Democratic	Manley J. Wilson	199,275	39.97%
Majority		100,020	20.06%
Turnout		498,570	
Republican hold			

== Rhode Island ==
Rhode Island election
Party	Candidate	Votes	%
Democratic	Theodore F. Green (incumbent)	190,158	59.35%
Republican	Thomas P. Hazard	130,262	40.65%
Majority		59,896	18.70%
Turnout		320,420	
Democratic hold			

== South Carolina ==
1948 Democratic Senate primary in South Carolina
- August 10, 1948
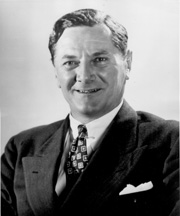

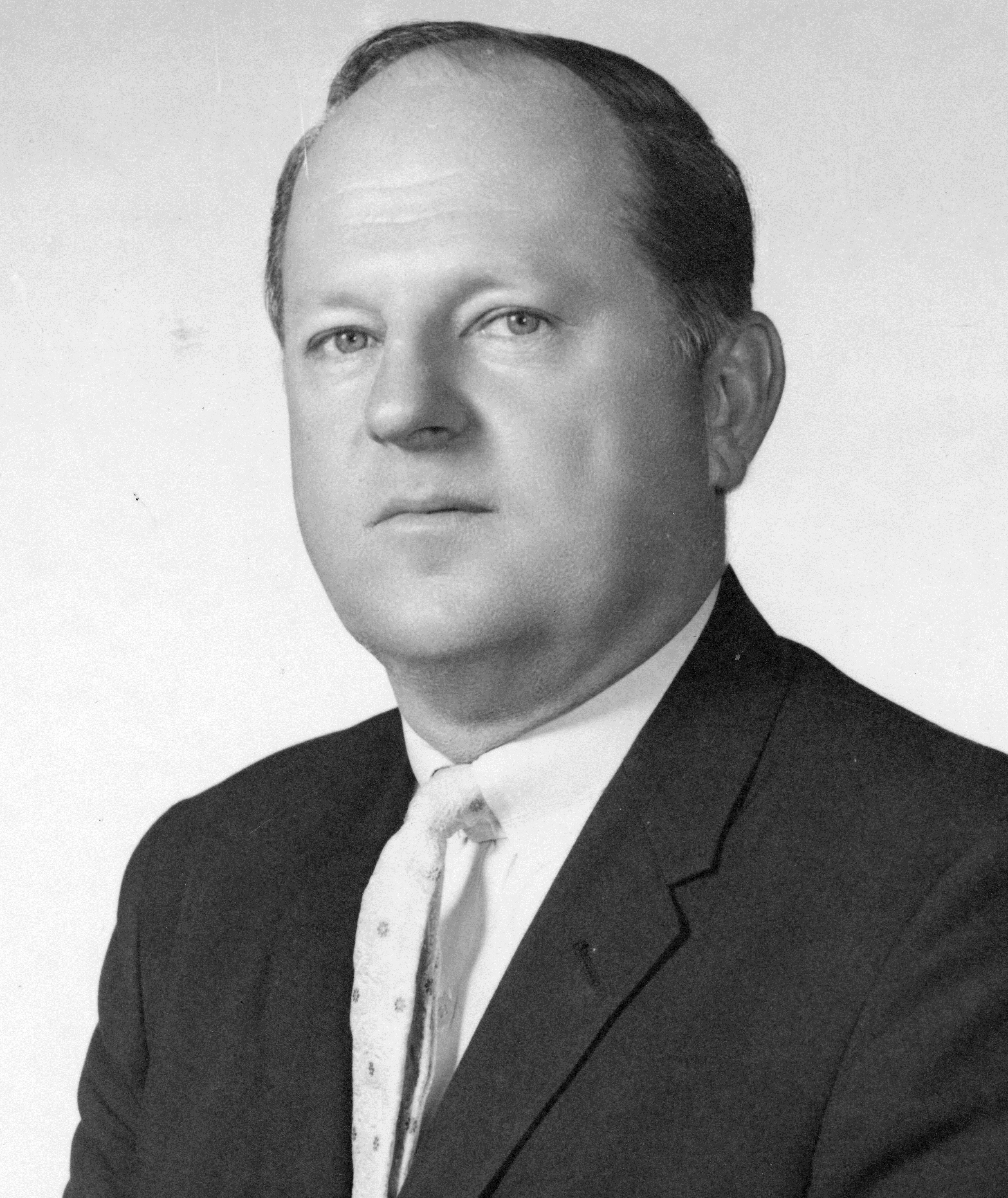
Nominee	Burnet R. Maybank	W.J. Bryan Dorn
Party	Democratic	Democratic
Popular vote	161,608	76,749
Percentage	51.63%	24.85%
Nominee	Neville Bennett	Alan Johnstone
Party	Democratic	Democratic
Popular vote	43,068	17,689
Percentage	13.48%	5.44%
- Results by county Maybank: 40–50% 50–60% 60–70% Dorn: 30–40% 40–50% 50–60% 60–70% Bennett: 80–90%
U.S. senator before election
Burnet R. Maybank
Democratic
Elected U.S. Senator
Burnet R. Maybank
Democratic

Senator Burnet R. Maybank was opposed in the Democratic primary by U.S. Representative William Jennings Bryan Dorn and three other candidates. Maybank obtained over 50% in the primary election on August 10 to avoid a runoff election.

Democratic primary
Candidate	Votes	%
Burnet R. Maybank	161,608	51.5
W.J. Bryan Dorn	76,749	24.4
Neville Bennett	43,068	13.7
Alan Johnstone	17,689	5.6
Marcus A. Stone	14,904	4.8

Since the end of Reconstruction in 1877, the Democratic Party had dominated the politics of South Carolina, and its statewide candidates were never seriously challenged. Maybank did not campaign for the general election, as there was no chance of defeat.

South Carolina U.S. Senate election, 1948
Party	Candidate	Votes	%
Democratic	Burnet R. Maybank (incumbent)	135,998	96.45%
Republican	J. Bates Gerald	5,008	3.55%
Majority		130,990	92.90
Turnout		141,006	
Democratic hold			

== South Dakota ==
1948 United States Senate election in South Dakota
- November 2, 1948
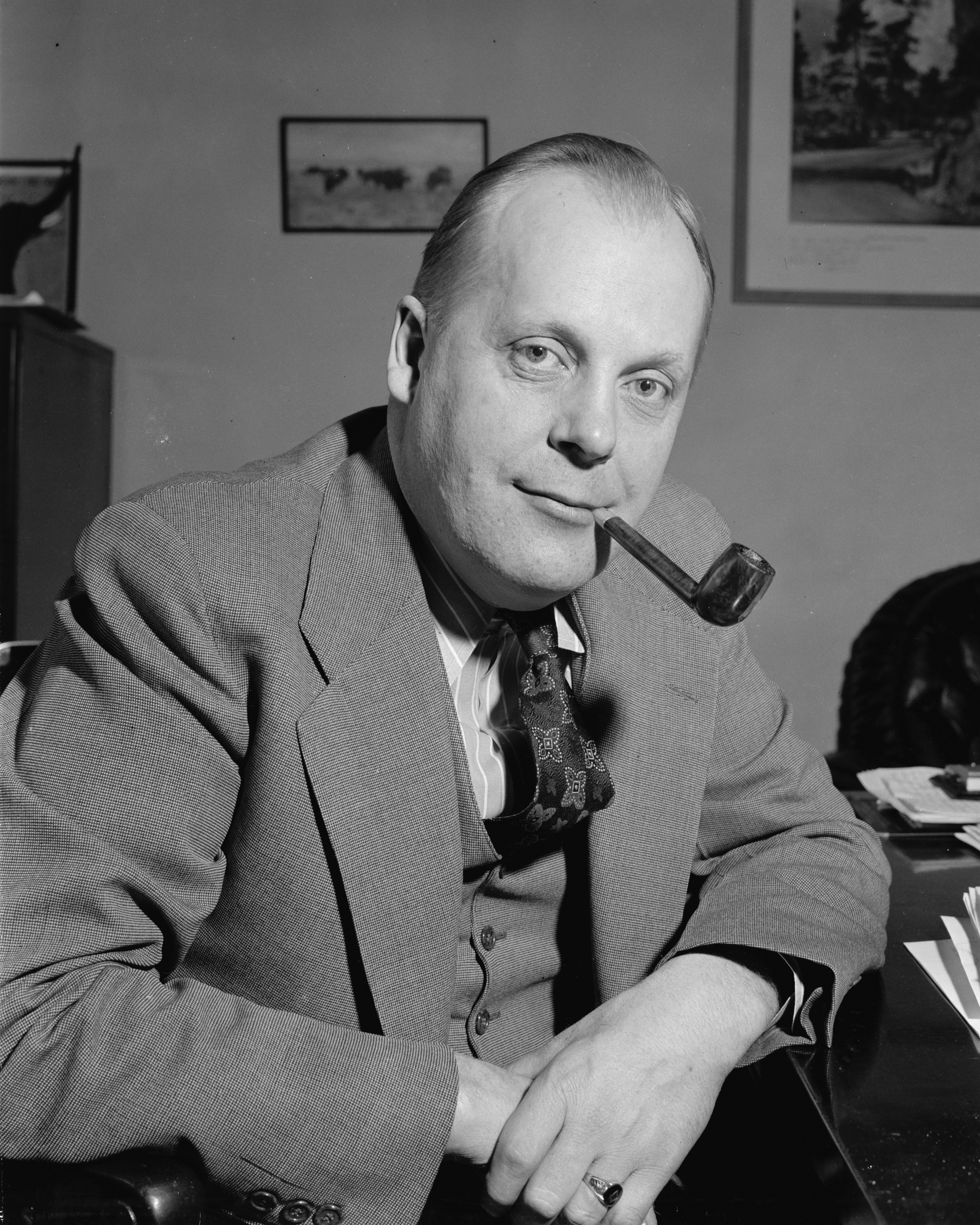
Nominee	Karl E. Mundt	John A. Engel
Party	Republican	Democratic
Popular vote	144,084	98,749
Percentage	59.33%	40.67%
- County results Mundt: 50–60% 60–70% 70–80% 80–90% Engel: 50–60% 60–70%
U.S. senator before election
Vera C. Bushfield
Republican
Elected U.S. Senator
Karl E. Mundt
Republican

South Dakota election
Party	Candidate	Votes	%
Republican	Karl E. Mundt	144,084	59.33%
Democratic	John A. Engel	98,749	40.67%
Majority		45,335	18.66%
Turnout		242,833	
Republican hold			

== Tennessee ==
1948 United States Senate election in Tennessee
- November 2, 1948
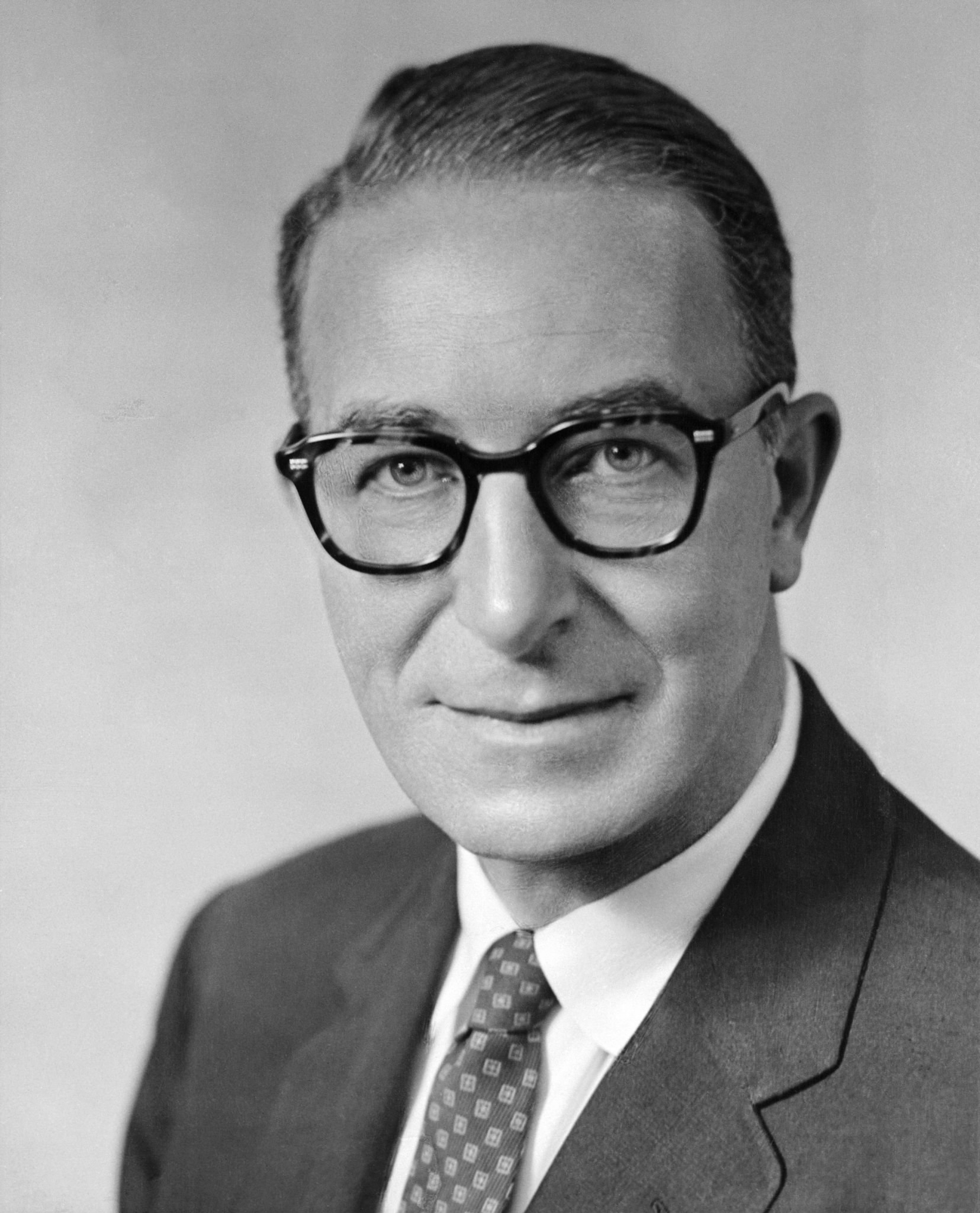

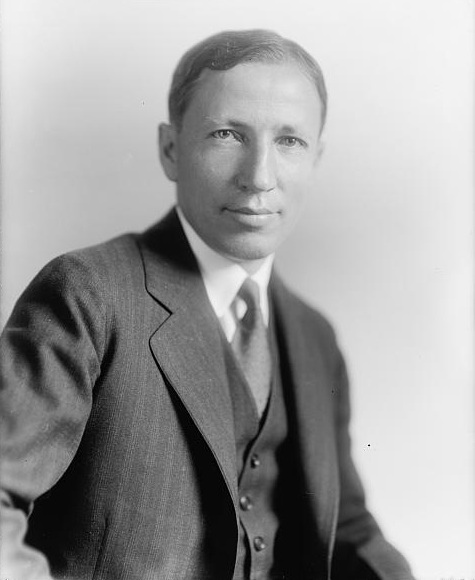
Nominee	Estes Kefauver	B. Carroll Reece
Party	Democratic	Republican
Popular vote	326,142	166,947
Percentage	65.33%	33.44%
- Results by county Kefauver: 40–50% 50–60% 60–70% 70–80% 80–90% 90–100% Reece: 40–50% 50–60% 60–70% 70–80% 80–90%
Senator before election
Tom Stewart
Democratic
Elected Senator
Estes Kefauver
Democratic

Tennessee election
Party	Candidate	Votes	%
Democratic	Estes Kefauver	326,142	65.33%
Republican	B. Carroll Reece	166,947	33.44%
Independent	John Randolph Neal Jr.	6,103	1.22%
None	Scattering	26	0.01%
Majority		159,195	31.89%
Turnout		499,218	
Democratic hold			

== Texas ==
1948 United States Senate election in Texas
- November 2, 1948
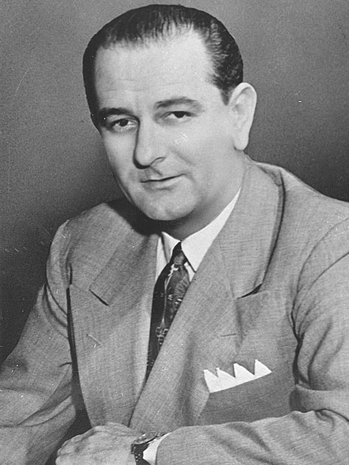

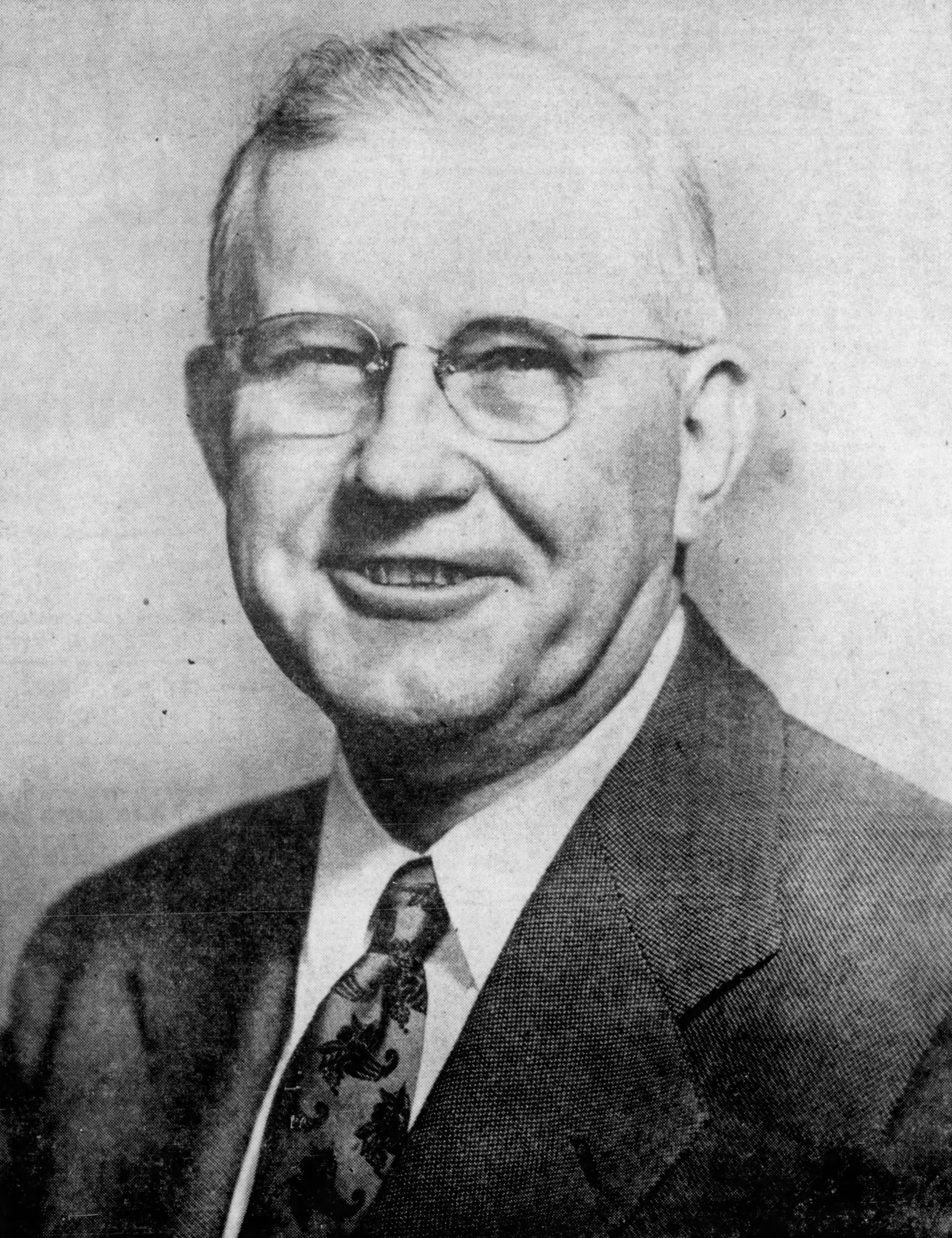
Nominee	Lyndon B. Johnson	Jack Porter
Party	Democratic	Republican
Popular vote	702,985	349,665
Percentage	66.22%	32.94%
- County results Johnson: 50–60% 60–70% 70–80% 80–90% >90% Porter: 40–50% 50–60% 60–70% 70–80% 80–90%
U.S. senator before election
W. Lee O'Daniel
Democratic
Elected U.S. Senator
Lyndon B. Johnson
Democratic

Incumbent Democrat W. Lee O'Daniel decided to retire rather than seek a second full term. Congressman Lyndon Johnson won the highly contested Democratic primary against former governor Coke Stevenson. Johnson went on to win the general election against Republican Jack Porter, but by a closer margin than usual for Texas Democrats.

Texas election
Party	Candidate	Votes	%
Democratic	Lyndon Johnson	702,985	66.22%
Republican	Jack Porter	349,665	32.94%
Prohibition	Samuel N. Morris	8,913	0.84%
Majority		353,320	33.28%
Turnout		1,061,563	
Democratic hold			

== Virginia ==
Virginia election
- November 2, 1948
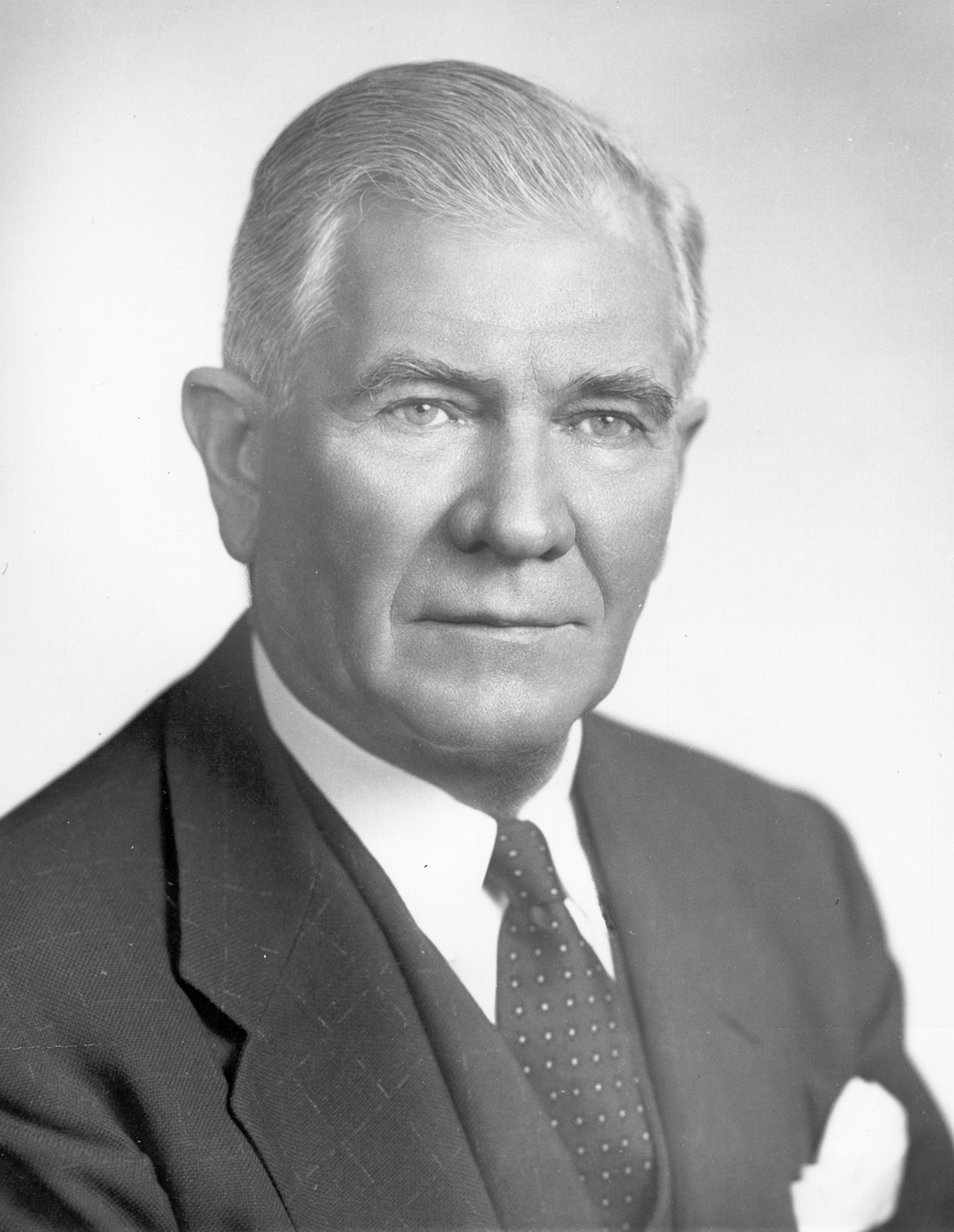

Nominee	A. Willis Robertson	Robert H. Woods
Party	Democratic	Republican
Popular vote	253,865	118,546
Percentage	65.7%	30.7%
- County and independent city results Robertson: 40–50% 50–60% 60–70% 70–80% 80–90% 90–100% Woods: 40–50% 50–60% 60–70%
U.S. senator before election
A. Willis Robertson
Democratic
Elected U.S. Senator
A. Willis Robertson
Democratic

Incumbent Democrat A. Willis Robertson defeated Republican Robert H. Woods and was re-elected to his first full term in office.

1948 United States Senate election in Virginia
Party	Candidate	Votes	%	±%
Democratic	A. Willis Robertson (incumbent)	253,865	65.74%	−2.41%
Republican	Robert H. Woods	118,546	30.70%	+1.68%
Independent	Howard Carwile	6,788	1.76%	
Progressive	Virginia Foster Durr	5,347	1.38%	+1.38%
Socialist	Clarke T. Robb	1,627	0.42%	−2.40%
Write-ins		5	<0.01%	
Majority		135,319	35.04%	−4.09%
Turnout		386,168		
Democratic hold		Swing		

== West Virginia ==
1948 United States Senate election in West Virginia
- November 2, 1948
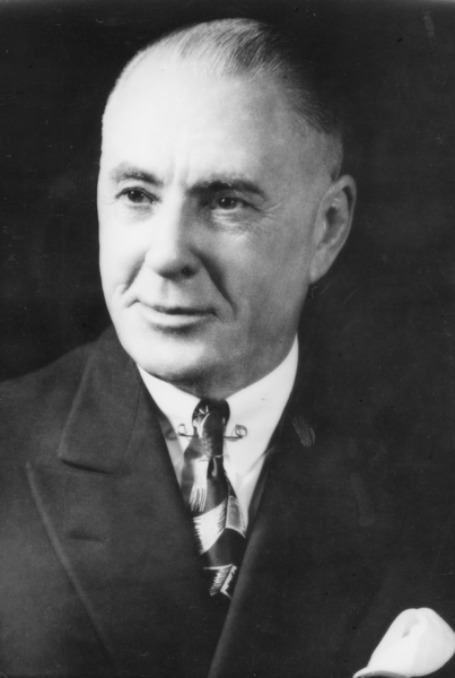

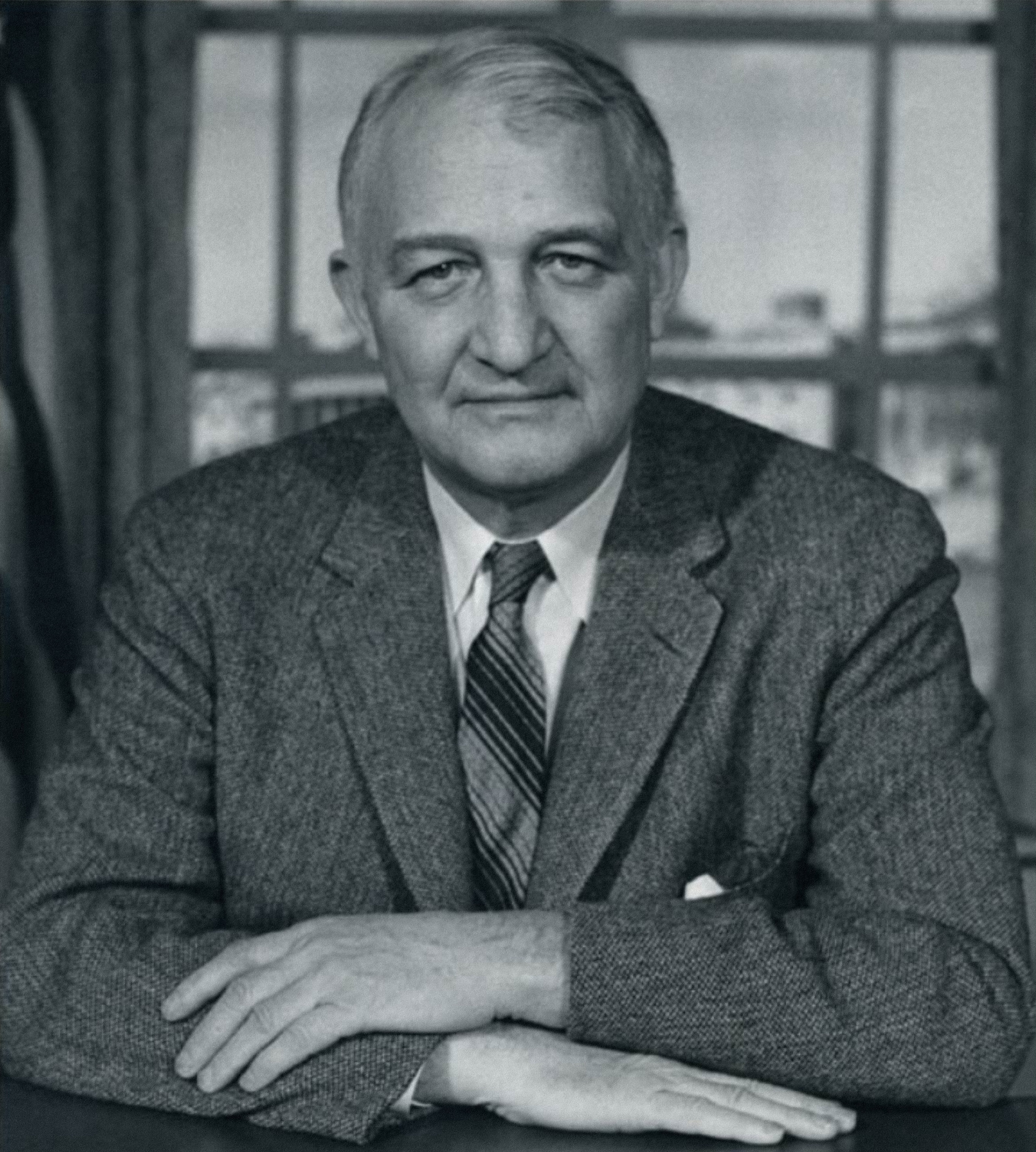
Nominee	Matthew M. Neely	Chapman Revercomb
Party	Democratic	Republican
Popular vote	435,354	328,534
Percentage	56.99%	43.01%
- County results Neely: 50–60% 60–70% 70–80% Revercomb: 50–60% 60–70% 70–80%
U.S. senator before election
Chapman Revercomb
Republican
Elected U.S. Senator
Matthew M. Neely
Democratic

West Virginia election
Party	Candidate	Votes	%
Democratic	Matthew M. Neely	435,354	56.99%
Republican	Chapman Revercomb (incumbent)	328,534	43.01%
Majority		106,810	13.98%
Turnout		763,888	
Democratic gain from Republican			

== Wyoming ==
1948 United States Senate election in Wyoming
- November 2, 1948
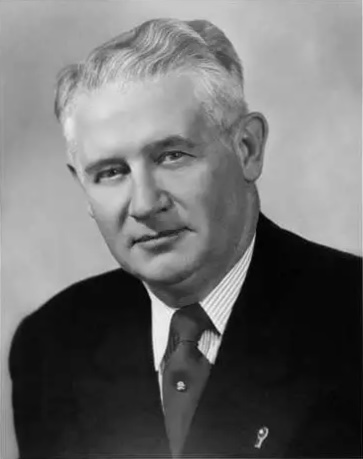

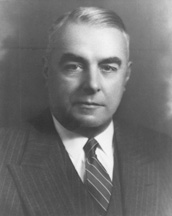
Nominee	Lester C. Hunt	Edward V. Robertson
Party	Democratic	Republican
Popular vote	57,953	43,527
Percentage	57.11%	42.89%
- County results Hunt: 50–60% 60–70% 70–80% Robertson: 50–60% 60–70%
U.S. senator before election
Edward V. Robertson
Republican
Elected U.S. Senator
Lester C. Hunt
Democratic

Wyoming election
Party	Candidate	Votes	%
Democratic	Lester C. Hunt	57,953	57.11%
Republican	Edward V. Robertson (incumbent)	43,527	42.89%
Majority		14,426	14.22%
Turnout		101,480	
Democratic gain from Republican			

|}

== See also ==
- 1948 United States elections
  - 1948 United States presidential election
  - 1948 United States House of Representatives elections
- 80th United States Congress
- 81st United States Congress

== Sources ==
- Zarnowitz, Victor (1996). Business Cycles: Theory, History, Indicators, and Forecasting. Chicago: University of Chicago Press. ISBN 978-0-226-97891-8.
