= 1948 United States Senate election in Alabama =

- November 2, 1948
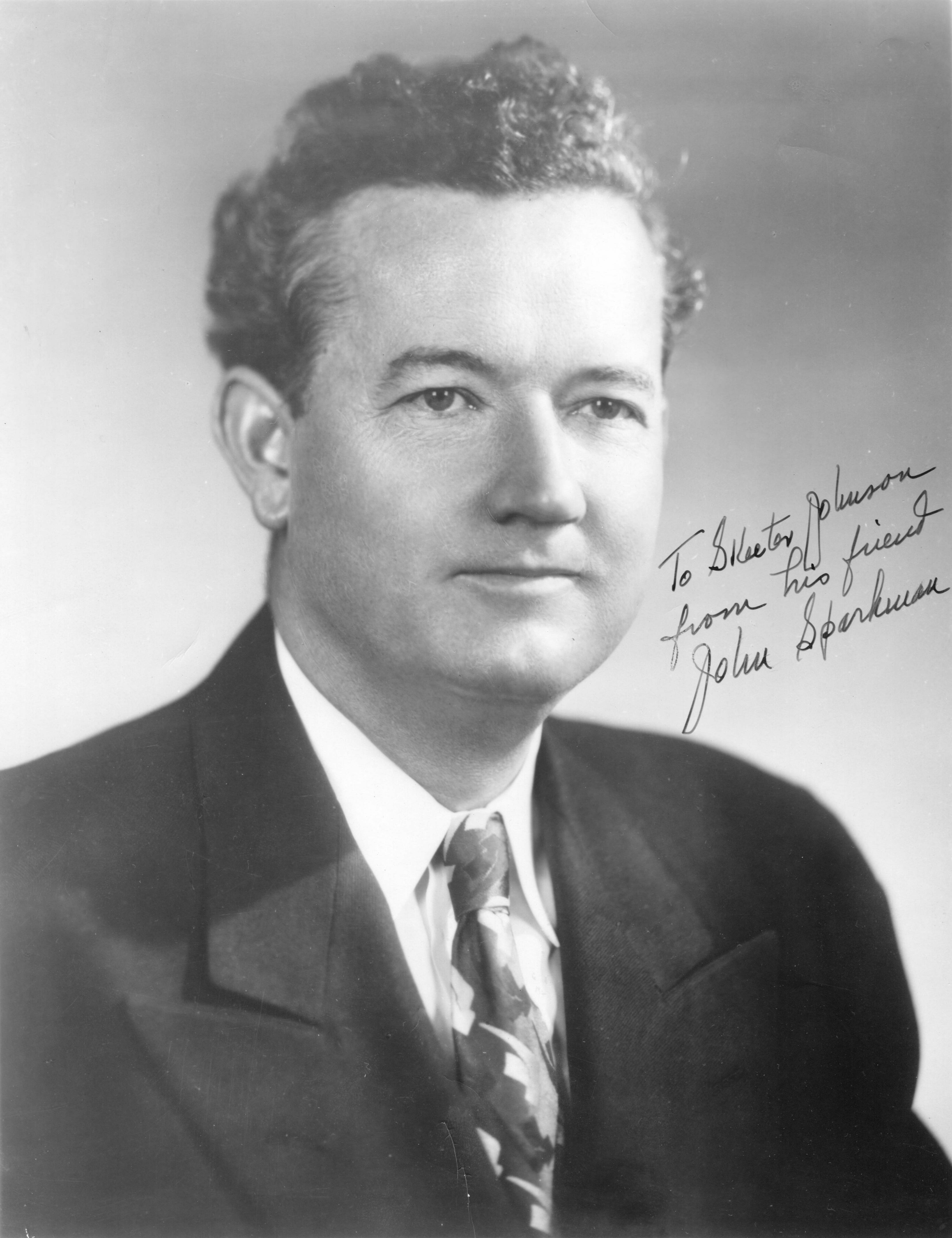

| Nominee | John Sparkman | Paul G. Parsons |
| Party | Democratic | Republican |
| Popular vote | 185,534 | 35,341 |
| Percentage | 84.00% | 16.00% |
- County results Sparkman: 60–70% 70–80% 80–90% >90% Parsons: 50–60%
U.S. senator before election
John Sparkman
Democratic
Elected U.S. Senator
John Sparkman
Democratic

The 1948 United States Senate election in Alabama was held on November 2, 1948.

Senator John Sparkman, who was first elected in 1946 to finish the incomplete term of John Bankhead II, was re-elected to a full term in office over Republican Paul Parsons.

== Democratic primary ==
=== Candidates ===
- Phil Hamm
- Thomas F. Harlin
- Thomas H. Maxwell
- Wallace Pruitt
- John Sparkman, incumbent Senator

=== Results ===
Primary results Sparkman: 50–60% 60–70% 70–80% 80–90% 90–100% Hamm: 60–70%

1948 Democratic U.S. Senate primary
| Party | Candidate | Votes | % |
|---|---|---|---|
| Democratic | John Sparkman (inc.) | 235,464 | 75.73% |
| Democratic | Phil Hamm | 61,308 | 19.72% |
| Democratic | Thomas H. Maxwell | 6,702 | 2.16% |
| Democratic | Wallace Pruitt | 4,483 | 1.44% |
| Democratic | Thomas F. Harlin | 2,972 | 0.96% |
| Total votes | | 310,929 | 100.00% |

== General election ==
=== Results ===
General election results
| Party | Candidate | Votes | % | ±% |
|---|---|---|---|---|
| Democratic | John Sparkman (inc.) | 185,534 | 84.00% | ▼16.00 |
| Republican | Paul G. Parsons | 35,341 | 16.00% | N/A |
| Total votes | | 220,875 | 100.00% | |

== See also ==
- 1948 United States Senate elections
