= Clem S. Clarke =

American politician (1897–1967)

Clement Steele Clarke
- Born: October 9, 1897; Marietta, Ohio, U.S.
- Died: March 28, 1967 (aged 69); Shreveport, Louisiana, U.S.
- Resting place: Greenwood Cemetery in Shreveport
- Education: Cornell University
- Occupation: Oilman
- Political party: Republican
- Spouse: Ellen Meng Lanham Clarke
- Children: 1

Clement Steele Clarke (October 9, 1897 – March 28, 1967) was an American politician from Shreveport, Louisiana, who was the first member of the Louisiana Republican Party to run for the United States Senate since implementation in 1914 of the Seventeenth Amendment to the United States Constitution. He lost the 1948 race to Democrat Russell B. Long, the older son of Huey Pierce Long Jr.

Clarke's first marriage was to Marjorie Terry, daughter of Dr. Roy A. Terry of Long Beach, California. The couple wed on July 13, 1934. The couple soon divorced, and Marjorie Clark married Donald Ballard on December 22, 1936.

Political offices
Preceded by Charles W. Page	Postmaster of Shreveport, Louisiana; 1926–1930	Succeeded by Carey P. Duncan
Party political offices
Preceded by None (1944)	Republican nominee for U.S. senator from Louisiana (Class 3); 1948 (special)	Succeeded by Charles Sidney Gerth (1950)
