= 1948 United States Senate election in Virginia =

- November 2, 1948
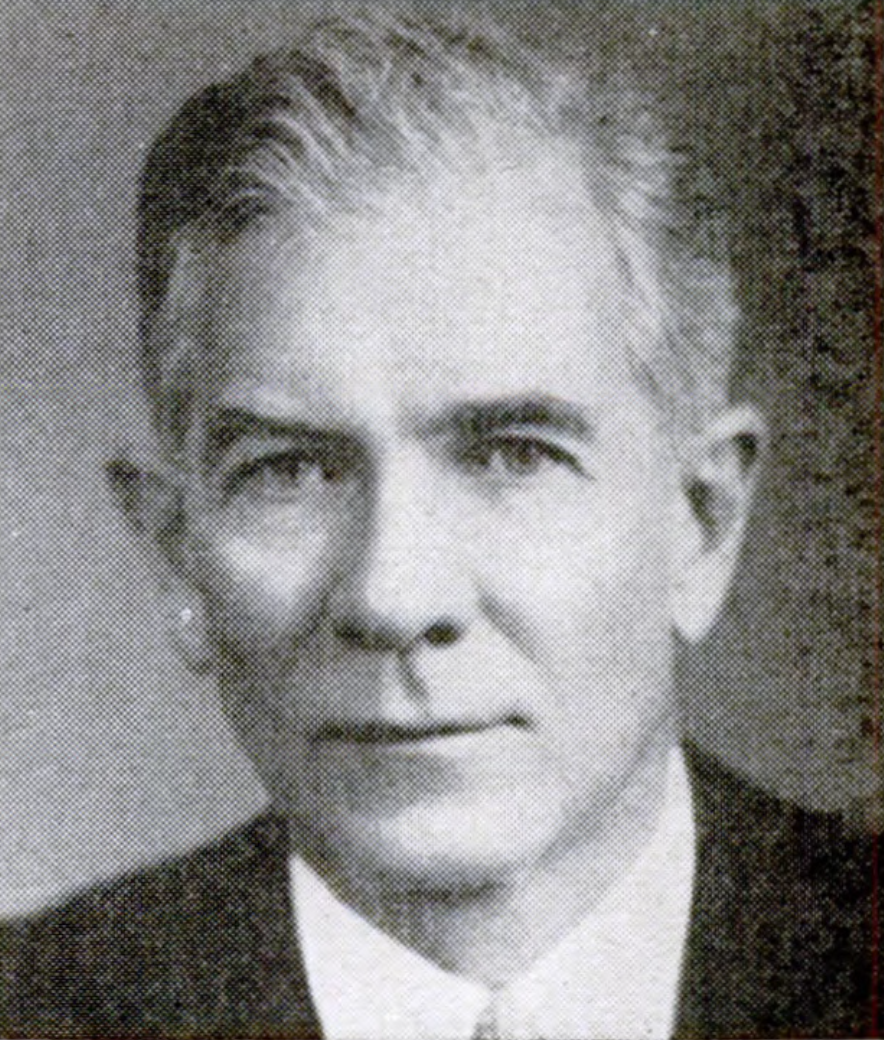

Nominee	Absalom Willis Robertson	Robert H. Woods
Party	Democratic	Republican
Popular vote	253,865	118,546
Percentage	65.74%	30.70%
- County and independent city results Robertson: 40–50% 50–60% 60–70% 70–80% 80–90% >90% Woods: 40–50% 50–60% 60–70%
U.S. senator before election
Absalom Willis Robertson
Democratic
Elected U.S. Senator
Absalom Willis Robertson
Democratic

The 1948 United States Senate election in Virginia was held on November 2, 1948. Incumbent Democratic Senator Absalom Willis Robertson defeated Republican Robert H. Woods and was re-elected to his first full term in office.

== Results ==
United States Senate election in Virginia, 1948
Party	Candidate	Votes	%	±%
Democratic	Absalom Willis Robertson (inc.)	253,865	65.74%	−2.41%
Republican	Robert H. Woods	118,546	30.70%	+1.68%
Independent	Howard Carwile	6,788	1.76%	
Progressive	Virginia Foster Durr	5,347	1.38%	+1.38%
Socialist	Clarke T. Robb	1,627	0.42%	−2.40%
Write-ins		5	<0.01%	
Majority		135,319	35.04%	−4.09%
Turnout		386,168		
Democratic hold				

== See also ==
- United States Senate elections, 1948 and 1949
