= 1946 United States Senate special election in Virginia =

- November 5, 1946
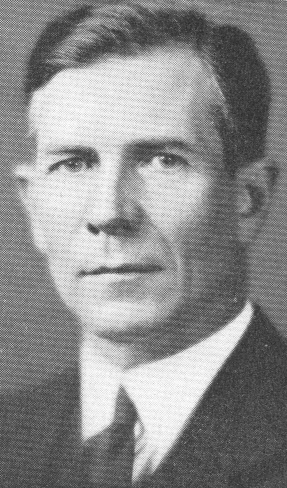

Nominee	A. Willis Robertson	Robert H. Woods
Party	Democratic	Republican
Popular vote	169,680	72,253
Percentage	68.15%	29.02%
- County and independent city results Robertson: 40–50% 50–60% 60–70% 70–80% 80–90% >90% Woods: 40–50% 50–60% 60–70%
U.S. senator before election
Thomas G. Burch
Democratic
Elected U.S. Senator
Absalom Willis Robertson
Democratic

The 1946 United States Senate special election in Virginia was held on November 5, 1946 to elect a United States Senator from Virginia to complete the unexpired term of Carter Glass, who died on office on May 28. Absalom Willis Robertson defeated Republican Robert H. Woods.

== Background ==
Incumbent United States Senator Carter Glass died in office on May 28, 1946. Governor of Virginia William M. Tuck appointed U.S. Representative Thomas G. Burch to fill the vacant seat until a successor could be duly elected to complete the remainder of Glass's unexpired term. Burch declined to run in the special election, which was scheduled for November 5, concurrent with the general election for Virginia's other United States Senate seat and seats in the United States House of Representatives.

== General election ==
=== Candidates ===
- A. Willis Robertson, U.S. Representative from Lexington (Democratic)
- Lawrence S. Wilkes (Socialist)
- Robert H. Woods (Republican)

=== Results ===
United States Senate special election in Virginia, 1946
Party	Candidate	Votes	%	±%
Democratic	Absalom Willis Robertson	169,680	68.15%	−22.93%
Republican	Robert H. Woods	72,253	29.02%	+29.02%
Socialist	Lawrence S. Wilkes	7,024	2.82%	−3.71%
Write-ins		5	<0.01%	
Majority		97,427	39.13%	−45.42%
Turnout		248,962		
Democratic hold				

== See also ==
- 1946 United States Senate elections
