= Raymond S. McKeough =

American politician

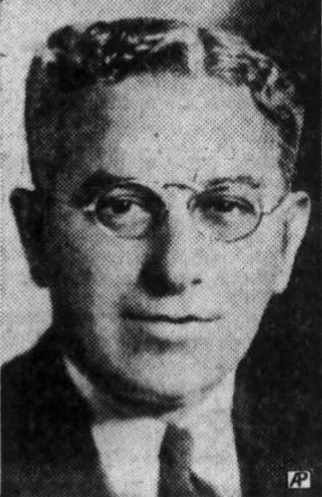
- The Rock Island Argus, February 6, 1942

Member of the U.S. House of Representatives from Illinois's 2nd district
- In office January 3, 1935 – January 3, 1943
- Preceded by: P. H. Moynihan
- Succeeded by: William A. Rowan

Personal details
- Born: April 29, 1888 Chicago, Illinois
- Died: December 16, 1979 (aged 91) Blue Island, Illinois
- Party: Democratic

Raymond Stephen McKeough (April 29, 1888 – December 16, 1979) was an American Democratic politician who served as a U.S. representative from Illinois from 1935 to 1943.

== Biography ==
McKeough was born in Chicago, Illinois. He graduated from the De La Salle Institute in 1905 and went to work in the Union Stock Yards. In 1909 he became a railroad clerk. He entered the securities industry in 1925 and was a broker from 1929 to 1934.

In 1934 McKeough won the Democratic nomination for Congress from Illinois' 2nd District. He was endorsed by the Cook County Democratic Party and its chairman Patrick Nash. McKeough served four two-year terms in this position.

In 1942, McKeough, already well-known statewide, decided to run for the United States Senate. His opponent in the Democratic primary was Paul Douglas, an economist and professor at the University of Chicago who had long been associated with "reform" politics. Douglas carried 99 of Illinois' 102 counties, but McKeough's Chicago-area majority was sufficient to overcome this and win the nomination. In November, however, McKeough lost to the incumbent Republican senator, Charles W. Brooks.

Soon after the end of his Congressional service, McKeough went to work for the Office of Price Administration, a World War II-era federal agency charged with the enforcement of wartime wage and price controls instituted to prevent inflation. He worked for this agency until January 1944. In October 1945, he was named to the United States Maritime Commission, serving on this body until 1950. He then served on the U.S. International Claims Commission from 1951 to 1953. In 1956, he worked briefly with the Great American Oil Company.

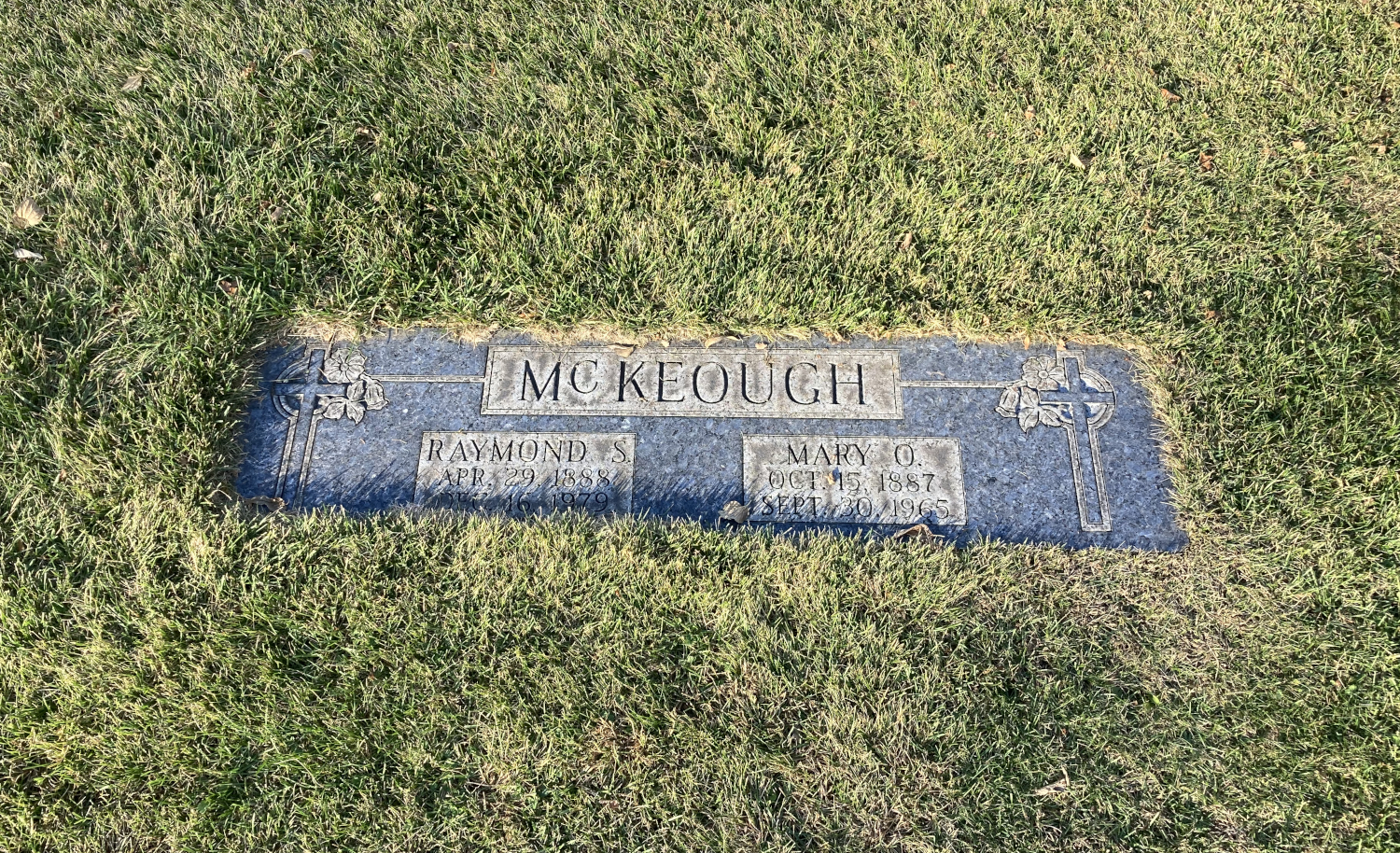
McKeough's grave at Saint Mary Catholic Cemetery

On December 3, 1956, McKeough embarked on what became his last stint in public service, as an assistant state's attorney. He held this position for exactly four years, retiring on December 3, 1960. After this, he engaged in the insurance business prior to his death in Blue Island, Illinois in 1979.

He was buried at Saint Mary Catholic Cemetery in Evergreen Park, Illinois.

Party political offices
Preceded by James M. Slattery	Democratic nominee for U.S. Senator from Illinois (Class 2); 1942	Succeeded by Paul Douglas
U.S. House of Representatives
Preceded by P. H. Moynihan	Member of the U.S. House of Representatives from Illinois's 2nd congressional district 1935–1943	Succeeded by William A. Rowan
