= 1940 United States Senate special election in Illinois =

- November 5, 1940
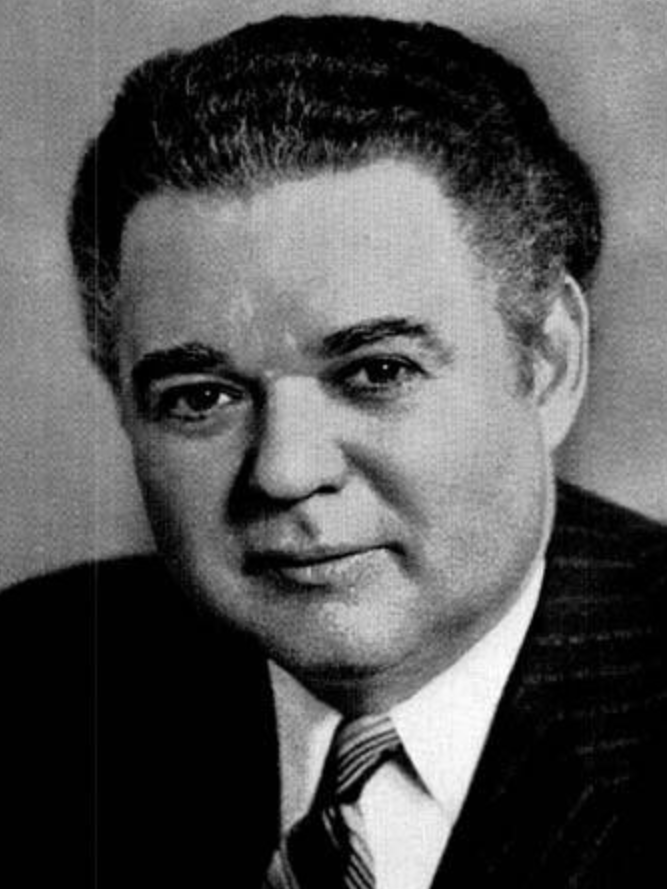

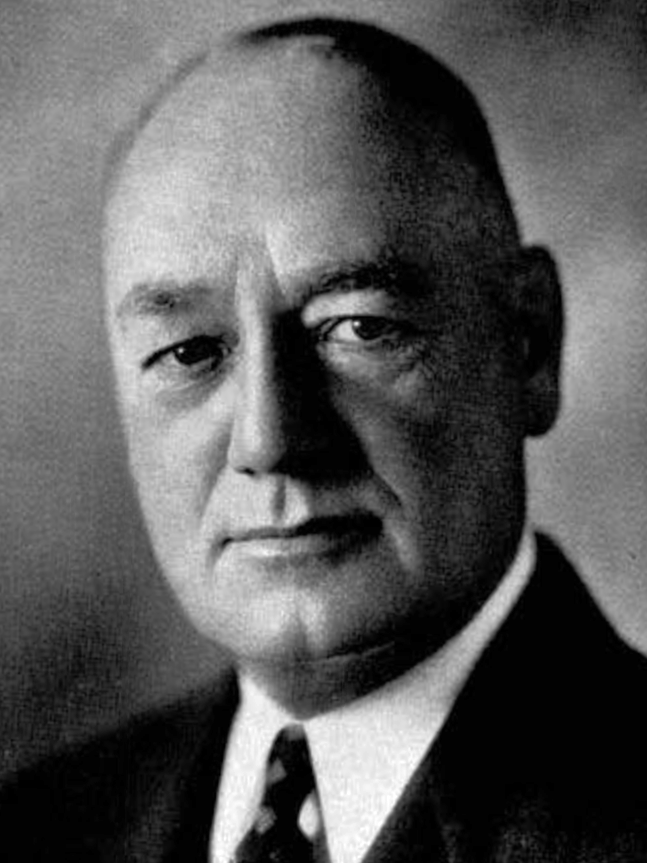
Nominee	C. Wayland Brooks	James M. Slattery
Party	Republican	Democratic
Popular vote	2,045,924	2,025,097
Percentage	50.07%	49.56%
- County results Brooks: 40–50% 50–60% 60–70% 70–80% Slattery: 50–60%
U.S. senator before election
James M. Slattery
Democratic
Elected U.S. senator
Charles W. Brooks
Republican

The 1940 United States Senate special election in Illinois took place on November 5, 1940. The election was triggered by the vacancy left by the death in office of Democrat J. Hamilton Lewis. After Lewis' death, James M. Slattery was appointed to fill the seat in the interim period until the individual elected in the special election would be sworn in. Slattery was the Democratic Party's nominee in the special election. He was defeated by Republican nominee C. Wayland Brooks. Brooks' father-in-law, Senator John Thomas of Idaho, also won a special election that same day and the two would serve in the Senate together until Thomas' death in 1945.

The primaries and general election coincided with those for other federal elections (president and House) and those for state elections.

Primaries were held April 9, 1940.

== Democratic primary ==
=== Candidates ===
- Benjamin S. Adamowski, State Representative from Chicago
- James M. Slattery, interim Senator and former chairman of the Illinois Commerce Commission

=== Results ===
Democratic primary
Party	Candidate	Votes	%
Democratic	James M. Slattery (incumbent)	796,036	60.89
Democratic	Benjamin S. Adamowski	511,231	39.11
Total votes		1,307,267	100

== Republican primary ==
=== Candidates ===
- C. Wayland Brooks, nominee for Governor in 1936
- Ralph E. Church, U.S. Representative from Evanston

=== Results ===
Republican primary
Party	Candidate	Votes	%
Republican	C. Wayland Brooks	618,857	59.61
Republican	Ralph E. Church	419,315	40.39
Total votes		1,038,172	100

== General election ==
1940 United States Senate special election in Illinois
Party	Candidate	Votes	%
Republican	C. Wayland Brooks	2,045,924	50.07
Democratic	James M. Slattery (incumbent)	2,025,097	49.56
Prohibition	Enoch A. Holtwick	3,844	0.21
Socialist	Clarence H. Mayer	2,281	0.16
Write-in		7	0.00
Majority		20,827	0.51
Turnout		4,086,179	
Republican gain from Democratic			

== See also ==
- 1940 United States Senate elections
