= Martin Bronfenbrenner =

American economist

- Born: December 2, 1914; Pittsburgh, Pennsylvania
- Died: June 2, 1997 (aged 82); Durham, North Carolina
- Spouse: Teruko Okuaki

Academic background
- Education: Washington University in St. Louis (B.A.); University of Chicago (Ph.D.)
- Thesis: Monetary Theory and General Equilibrium (1939)
- Doctoral advisor: Henry Schultz; Paul Douglas

Academic work
- School or tradition: Neoclassical economics
- Institutions: Duke University

Martin Bronfenbrenner (December 2, 1914 – June 2, 1997) was an American economist who served as William R. Kenan, Jr. Professor Emeritus of Economics at Duke University. His publications, including more than 250 scholarly papers and five books, cover a host of topics, including aggregate economics, income distribution, international economics, and Japan. His scholarship was recognized on several occasions, including his election as Fellow of the American Academy of Arts and Sciences, and as a Distinguished Fellow of the American Economic Association.

Bronfenbrenner received his B.A. from Washington University in St. Louis in 1934, and his doctorate from the University of Chicago in 1939 with a dissertation on Monetary Theory and General Equilibrium, nearly completed under the guidance of Henry Schultz before the latter's death.

He went on to teach at Roosevelt University, the University of Wisconsin–Madison (1947–1957), Michigan State University (1957–1959), the University of Minnesota (1959–1962) and Carnegie Mellon University (1962–1971), where he also served as department chair. He later taught at Aoyama Gakuin University in Tokyo, Japan from 1984 to 1990 and Duke University from 1971 to 1984, and from 1991 until his death.

== Relationships ==
He married Teruko Okuaki Bronfenbrenner and had two children.

== Selected publications ==
=== Books ===
- Academic Encounter (New York: Free Press, 1961)
- Is the Business Cycle Obsolete? (Editor; New York: Wiley, 1969)
- Long-Range Projections of the Japanese Economy, 1962-1975 (Santa Barbara: Technical Military Planning Operation, 1958)
- Income Distribution Theory (Chicago: Aldine, 1971)
- Tomioka Stories from the Japanese Occupation (Exposition Press, 1976)
- Macroeconomic Alternatives (AHM Publishing Co., 1979)
- Microeconomics (Boston: Houghton Mifflin, 1987)
- Here and There in Economics (Tokyo: Aoyama Gakuin University, 1988)

=== Articles ===
- Economics of the Socialist Countries: General Comment, in Berliner, J. S.; Kosta, H.; Hagoki, M. (eds.), Economics of the Socialist Countries (Tokyo: Maruzen, 1989), 193–196
- International Economics in Embryo, in Feiwel, G. (ed.), Joan Robinson and Modern Economic Theory (New York: New York University Press, 1989), 727-38
- Economy and Culture: The Case of U.S.-Japan Economic Relations: Commentary, in Hayashi, K. (ed.), The U.S.- Japanese Economic Relationship: Can It Be Improved? (New York, London: New York University Press,1989), 14–18
- A Bean-Brick Parable: "Consumer Sovereignty" Yet Again, Eastern Economic Journal (July-Sept. 1990), 265–70
- Economics as Dentistry, Southern Economic Journal (Jan. 1991), 599–605
- General Comments on the International Symposium on Making Economies More Efficient and More Equitable, in Mizoguchi, T. (ed.), Making Economies More Efficient and More Equitable: Factors Determining Income Distribution (Oxford, New York: Oxford University Press, 1991), 439–43
- Wisconsin 1947-1957—Reflections and Confessions: De Mortuis Nil Nisi Bolognam. In Lampman, R. (ed.), Economists at Wisconsin: 1892-1992 (Madison: University of Wisconsin, 1993), 130–38
- Review of: Nicholas Kaldor and the Real World, Journal of Economic Literature (Dec. 1994), 1864–66
- Maldistribution and Interdependent Utilities: Editorial, Journal of Income Distribution (1994–1995), 155–58
- Say's Law Extended: An Expository Approach, in Hoover, K.; Sheffrin, S. (eds.), Monetarism and the Methodology of Economics: Essays in Honor of Thomas Mayer (Brookfield, VT: Ashgate, 1995), 73–85
