= 1940 United States presidential election in Illinois =

- November 5, 1940

All 29 Illinois votes to the Electoral College

Nominee	Franklin D. Roosevelt	Wendell Willkie
Party	Democratic	Republican
Home state	New York	New York
Running mate	Henry A. Wallace	Charles L. McNary
Electoral vote	29	0
Popular vote	2,149,934	2,047,240
Percentage	50.97%	48.54%
County results
Roosevelt
40–50%
50–60%
Willkie
40–50%
50–60%
60–70%
70–80%
President before election
Franklin D. Roosevelt
Democratic
Elected President
Franklin D. Roosevelt
Democratic

The 1940 United States presidential election in Illinois took place on November 5, 1940, as part of the 1940 United States presidential election. State voters chose 29 representatives, or electors, to the Electoral College, who voted for president and vice president.

Illinois was won by incumbent President Franklin D. Roosevelt (D–New York), running with Secretary Henry A. Wallace, with 50.97% of the popular vote, against Wendell Willkie (R–New York), running with Minority Leader Charles L. McNary, with 48.54% of the popular vote.

== Primaries ==
The primaries and general elections coincided with those for other federal offices (Senate and House), as well as those for state offices.

=== Turnout ===
The total vote in the state-run primary elections (Democratic and Republican) was 2,365,144.

The total vote in the general election was 4,217,935. Both major parties held non-binding state-run preferential primaries on April 9.

=== Democratic ===
1940 Illinois Democratic presidential primary
- April 9, 1940
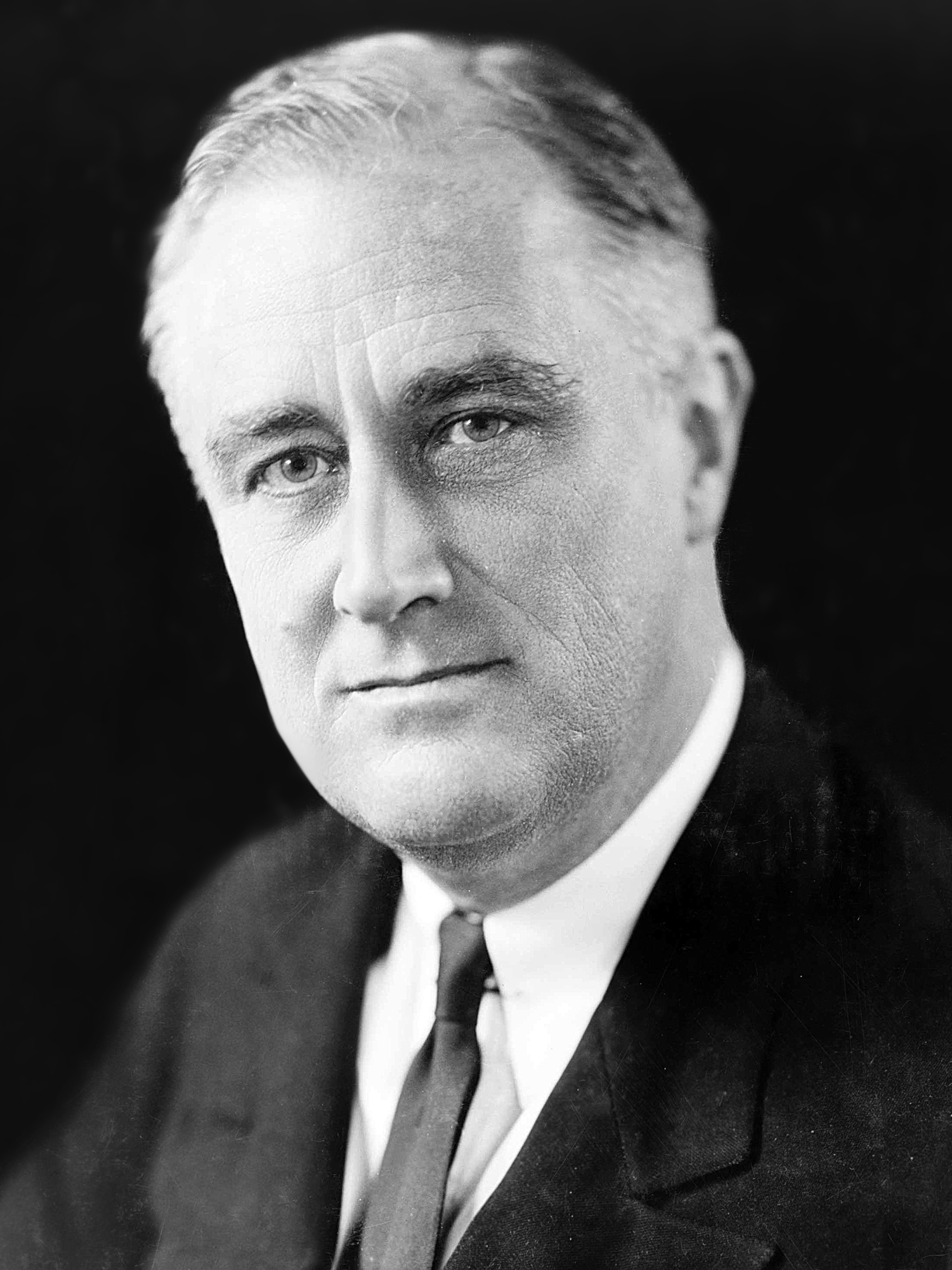

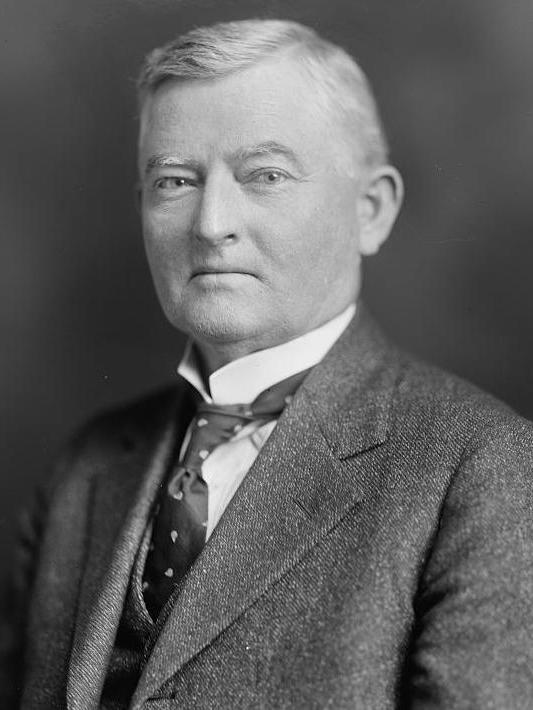
Candidate	Franklin D. Roosevelt	John Nance Garner
Home state	New York	Texas
Popular vote	1,176,531	190,801
Percentage	86.04%	13.95%

The 1940 Illinois Democratic presidential primary was held on April 9, 1940, in the U.S. state of Illinois as one of the Democratic Party's state primaries ahead of the 1940 presidential election.

The popular vote was a non-binding "beauty contest". Delegates were instead elected by direct votes by congressional district on delegate candidates.

1940 Illinois Democratic presidential primary
Candidate	Votes	%
Franklin D. Roosevelt	1,176,531	86.04
John Nance Garner	190,801	13.95
Scattering	35	0.00
Total	1,367,367	100

=== Republican ===
1940 Illinois Republican presidential primary
- April 9, 1940
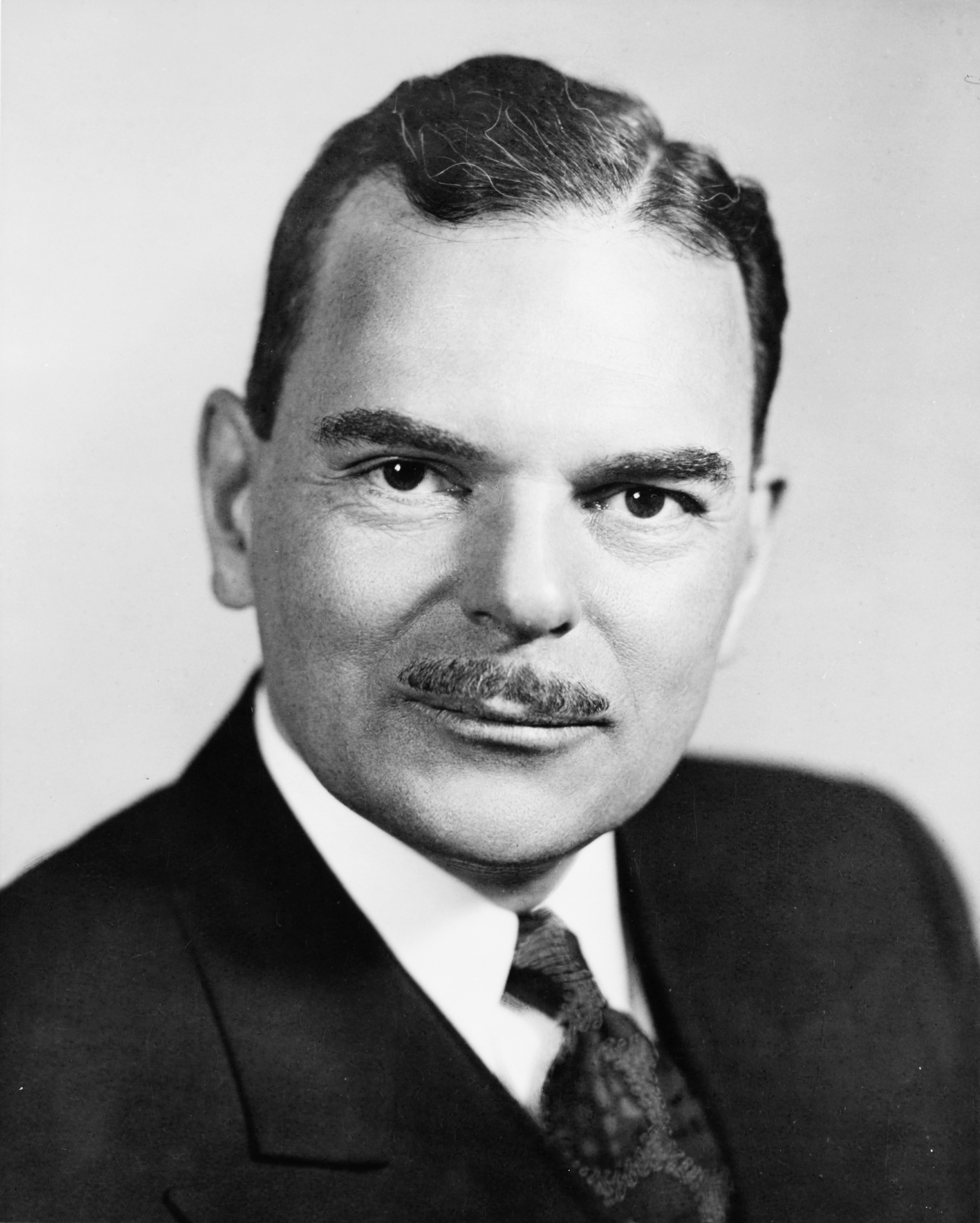
Candidate	Thomas E. Dewey
Home state	New York
Popular vote	997,225
Percentage	99.95%

The 1940 Illinois Republican presidential primary was held on April 9, 1940, in the U.S. state of Illinois as one of the Republican Party's state primaries ahead of the 1940 presidential election.

The preference vote was a "beauty contest". Delegates were instead selected by direct-vote in each congressional districts on delegate candidates.

1940 Illinois Republican presidential primary
Candidate	Votes	%
Thomas E. Dewey	997,225	99.95
Scattering	552	0.06
Total	997,777	100

== Results ==
1940 United States presidential election in Illinois
Party	Candidate	Votes	%
Democratic	Franklin D. Roosevelt (inc.)	2,149,934	50.97%
Republican	Wendell Willkie	2,047,240	48.54%
Socialist	Norman Thomas	10,914	0.26%
Prohibition	Roger W. Babson	9,190	0.22%
Write-in		657	0.02%
Total votes		4,217,935	100%

=== Results by county ===
County	Franklin Delano Roosevelt Democratic		Wendell Lewis Willkie Republican		Normal Mattoon Thomas Socialist		Various candidates Other parties		Margin		Total votes cast
County	#	%	#	%	#	%	#	%	#	%	Total votes cast
Adams	17,361	47.78%	18,480	50.86%	119	0.33%	373	1.03%	-1,119	-3.08%	36,333
Alexander	6,591	50.75%	6,260	48.20%	69	0.53%	68	0.52%	331	2.55%	12,988
Bond	3,376	40.75%	4,754	57.38%	20	0.24%	135	1.63%	-1,378	-16.63%	8,285
Boone	2,277	26.38%	6,330	73.33%	11	0.13%	14	0.16%	-4,053	-46.95%	8,632
Brown	2,478	53.31%	2,101	45.20%	1	0.02%	68	1.46%	377	8.11%	4,648
Bureau	8,274	38.29%	13,258	61.36%	46	0.21%	29	0.13%	-4,984	-23.07%	21,607
Calhoun	1,625	39.08%	2,516	60.51%	11	0.26%	6	0.14%	-891	-21.43%	4,158
Carroll	3,592	35.87%	6,398	63.90%	8	0.08%	15	0.15%	-2,806	-28.02%	10,013
Cass	4,854	51.55%	4,490	47.68%	30	0.32%	42	0.45%	364	3.87%	9,416
Champaign	17,563	46.04%	20,314	53.26%	165	0.43%	102	0.27%	-2,751	-7.21%	38,144
Christian	11,457	52.41%	10,255	46.91%	50	0.23%	100	0.46%	1,202	5.50%	21,862
Clark	4,807	44.36%	5,976	55.15%	5	0.05%	48	0.44%	-1,169	-10.79%	10,836
Clay	4,934	48.27%	5,185	50.72%	31	0.30%	72	0.70%	-251	-2.46%	10,222
Clinton	4,558	37.27%	7,582	62.00%	60	0.49%	30	0.25%	-3,024	-24.73%	12,230
Coles	11,409	51.83%	10,528	47.82%	29	0.13%	48	0.22%	881	4.00%	22,014
Cook	1,168,141	55.24%	938,454	44.38%	4,908	0.23%	3,304	0.16%	229,687	10.86%	2,114,807
Crawford	5,703	44.54%	7,036	54.95%	12	0.09%	54	0.42%	-1,333	-10.41%	12,805
Cumberland	3,091	47.92%	3,330	51.62%	11	0.17%	19	0.29%	-239	-3.70%	6,451
DeKalb	6,989	35.53%	12,577	63.95%	53	0.27%	49	0.25%	-5,588	-28.41%	19,668
DeWitt	5,052	47.78%	5,477	51.80%	14	0.13%	31	0.29%	-425	-4.02%	10,574
Douglas	4,513	44.99%	5,451	54.34%	31	0.31%	36	0.36%	-938	-9.35%	10,031
DuPage	18,923	31.51%	40,746	67.85%	307	0.51%	73	0.12%	-21,823	-36.34%	60,049
Edgar	6,713	45.42%	7,985	54.03%	22	0.15%	60	0.41%	-1,272	-8.61%	14,780
Edwards	1,770	34.16%	3,361	64.86%	23	0.44%	28	0.54%	-1,591	-30.70%	5,182
Effingham	5,988	49.88%	5,941	49.48%	27	0.22%	50	0.42%	47	0.39%	12,006
Fayette	7,286	48.85%	7,486	50.19%	30	0.20%	113	0.76%	-200	-1.34%	14,915
Ford	3,062	34.55%	5,770	65.11%	17	0.19%	13	0.15%	-2,708	-30.56%	8,862
Franklin	15,523	54.16%	12,936	45.14%	101	0.35%	100	0.35%	2,587	9.03%	28,660
Fulton	12,198	48.35%	12,816	50.80%	96	0.38%	118	0.47%	-618	-2.45%	25,228
Gallatin	3,293	55.54%	2,588	43.65%	18	0.30%	30	0.51%	705	11.89%	5,929
Greene	6,015	55.06%	4,840	44.30%	28	0.26%	42	0.38%	1,175	10.76%	10,925
Grundy	4,105	38.22%	6,593	61.38%	23	0.21%	20	0.19%	-2,488	-23.16%	10,741
Hamilton	3,691	47.64%	4,005	51.69%	24	0.31%	28	0.36%	-314	-4.05%	7,748
Hancock	6,688	41.90%	9,108	57.06%	24	0.15%	141	0.88%	-2,420	-15.16%	15,961
Hardin	1,974	45.56%	2,333	53.84%	10	0.23%	16	0.37%	-359	-8.29%	4,333
Henderson	1,977	37.44%	3,264	61.81%	17	0.32%	23	0.44%	-1,287	-24.37%	5,281
Henry	10,481	40.86%	14,971	58.37%	123	0.48%	73	0.28%	-4,490	-17.51%	25,648
Iroquois	7,036	38.68%	11,047	60.73%	15	0.08%	93	0.51%	-4,011	-22.05%	18,191
Jackson	9,600	44.22%	11,980	55.19%	65	0.30%	63	0.29%	-2,380	-10.96%	21,708
Jasper	3,689	47.20%	4,082	52.23%	10	0.13%	34	0.44%	-393	-5.03%	7,815
Jefferson	10,887	55.22%	8,692	44.09%	38	0.19%	98	0.50%	2,195	11.13%	19,715
Jersey	3,692	47.99%	3,958	51.44%	27	0.35%	17	0.22%	-266	-3.46%	7,694
Jo Daviess	3,864	34.52%	7,285	65.09%	23	0.21%	20	0.18%	-3,421	-30.57%	11,192
Johnson	2,254	36.99%	3,827	62.80%	4	0.07%	9	0.15%	-1,573	-25.81%	6,094
Kane	25,676	37.81%	41,949	61.77%	222	0.33%	67	0.10%	-16,273	-23.96%	67,914
Kankakee	13,716	45.97%	15,998	53.62%	61	0.20%	63	0.21%	-2,282	-7.65%	29,838
Kendall	1,978	31.92%	4,200	67.79%	10	0.16%	8	0.13%	-2,222	-35.86%	6,196
Knox	12,597	41.68%	17,459	57.77%	116	0.38%	52	0.17%	-4,862	-16.09%	30,224
Lake	24,965	39.34%	38,242	60.26%	203	0.32%	51	0.08%	-13,277	-20.92%	63,461
LaSalle	29,704	53.62%	25,296	45.66%	207	0.37%	192	0.35%	4,408	7.96%	55,399
Lawrence	5,625	47.54%	6,061	51.22%	28	0.24%	119	1.01%	-436	-3.68%	11,833
Lee	6,005	34.74%	11,228	64.96%	26	0.15%	26	0.15%	-5,223	-30.22%	17,285
Livingston	7,722	35.61%	13,909	64.14%	30	0.14%	25	0.12%	-6,187	-28.53%	21,686
Logan	6,753	42.94%	8,929	56.78%	20	0.13%	23	0.15%	-2,176	-13.84%	15,725
Macon	27,589	57.64%	19,998	41.78%	88	0.18%	189	0.39%	7,591	15.86%	47,864
Macoupin	14,356	52.00%	13,000	47.08%	180	0.65%	74	0.27%	1,356	4.91%	27,610
Madison	44,803	59.01%	30,445	40.10%	508	0.67%	173	0.23%	14,358	18.91%	75,929
Marion	13,807	56.41%	10,461	42.74%	60	0.25%	148	0.60%	3,346	13.67%	24,476
Marshall	3,343	42.26%	4,527	57.23%	30	0.38%	10	0.13%	-1,184	-14.97%	7,910
Mason	4,416	49.08%	4,541	50.47%	18	0.20%	23	0.26%	-125	-1.39%	8,998
Massac	2,813	37.14%	4,722	62.34%	16	0.21%	23	0.30%	-1,909	-25.20%	7,574
McDonough	5,783	35.66%	10,326	63.67%	26	0.16%	82	0.51%	-4,543	-28.01%	16,217
McHenry	6,170	27.07%	16,480	72.30%	125	0.55%	20	0.09%	-10,310	-45.23%	22,795
McLean	18,024	44.87%	21,865	54.44%	127	0.32%	150	0.37%	-3,841	-9.56%	40,166
Menard	2,894	44.81%	3,531	54.68%	16	0.25%	17	0.26%	-637	-9.86%	6,458
Mercer	3,830	37.53%	6,336	62.09%	20	0.20%	18	0.18%	-2,506	-24.56%	10,204
Monroe	2,826	37.17%	4,754	62.54%	20	0.26%	2	0.03%	-1,928	-25.36%	7,602
Montgomery	9,654	47.50%	10,497	51.65%	85	0.42%	89	0.44%	-843	-4.15%	20,325
Morgan	9,082	47.10%	10,137	52.57%	21	0.11%	43	0.22%	-1,055	-5.47%	19,283
Moultrie	3,696	50.13%	3,636	49.32%	7	0.09%	34	0.46%	60	0.81%	7,373
Ogle	4,833	28.87%	11,838	70.71%	28	0.17%	43	0.26%	-7,005	-41.84%	16,742
Peoria	42,009	54.40%	34,911	45.21%	176	0.23%	125	0.16%	7,098	9.19%	77,221
Perry	6,539	47.26%	7,243	52.35%	24	0.17%	31	0.22%	-704	-5.09%	13,837
Piatt	3,564	43.68%	4,564	55.94%	7	0.09%	24	0.29%	-1,000	-12.26%	8,159
Pike	7,676	53.15%	6,619	45.83%	19	0.13%	127	0.88%	1,057	7.32%	14,441
Pope	1,499	33.84%	2,914	65.78%	9	0.20%	8	0.18%	-1,415	-31.94%	4,430
Pulaski	3,456	42.75%	4,589	56.76%	18	0.22%	22	0.27%	-1,133	-14.01%	8,085
Putnam	1,195	40.03%	1,778	59.56%	8	0.27%	4	0.13%	-583	-19.53%	2,985
Randolph	7,802	45.32%	9,333	54.21%	54	0.31%	26	0.15%	-1,531	-8.89%	17,215
Richland	4,335	45.89%	5,022	53.17%	13	0.14%	76	0.80%	-687	-7.27%	9,446
Rock Island	35,240	57.67%	25,629	41.95%	132	0.22%	100	0.16%	9,611	15.73%	61,101
Saline	10,692	50.02%	10,567	49.43%	37	0.17%	81	0.38%	125	0.58%	21,377
Sangamon	31,943	47.23%	35,464	52.44%	111	0.16%	110	0.16%	-3,521	-5.21%	67,628
Schuyler	3,404	50.04%	3,318	48.77%	12	0.18%	69	1.01%	86	1.26%	6,803
Scott	2,492	48.87%	2,585	50.70%	9	0.18%	13	0.25%	-93	-1.82%	5,099
Shelby	7,704	50.69%	7,250	47.71%	68	0.45%	175	1.15%	454	2.99%	15,197
St. Clair	53,482	59.50%	35,998	40.05%	291	0.32%	120	0.13%	17,484	19.45%	89,891
Stark	1,818	34.79%	3,393	64.94%	1	0.02%	13	0.25%	-1,575	-30.14%	5,225
Stephenson	8,911	38.67%	14,040	60.92%	49	0.21%	45	0.20%	-5,129	-22.26%	23,045
Tazewell	17,624	58.44%	12,419	41.18%	52	0.17%	64	0.21%	5,205	17.26%	30,159
Union	5,804	53.74%	4,915	45.51%	45	0.42%	36	0.33%	889	8.23%	10,800
Vermilion	22,891	49.50%	23,059	49.87%	62	0.13%	230	0.50%	-168	-0.36%	46,242
Wabash	4,187	52.57%	3,659	45.94%	6	0.08%	113	1.42%	528	6.63%	7,965
Warren	4,878	38.30%	7,790	61.17%	11	0.09%	56	0.44%	-2,912	-22.87%	12,735
Washington	3,479	37.73%	5,701	61.82%	22	0.24%	20	0.22%	-2,222	-24.09%	9,222
Wayne	5,569	45.68%	6,556	53.77%	23	0.19%	44	0.36%	-987	-8.10%	12,192
White	5,909	51.41%	5,459	47.50%	70	0.61%	55	0.48%	450	3.92%	11,493
Whiteside	7,356	31.65%	15,752	67.77%	90	0.39%	44	0.19%	-8,396	-36.12%	23,242
Will	29,442	47.53%	32,291	52.13%	176	0.28%	37	0.06%	-2,849	-4.60%	61,946
Williamson	14,645	50.12%	14,433	49.40%	67	0.23%	72	0.25%	212	0.73%	29,217
Winnebago	28,061	47.46%	30,683	51.89%	178	0.30%	205	0.35%	-2,622	-4.43%	59,127
Woodford	4,314	39.43%	6,575	60.09%	20	0.18%	33	0.30%	-2,261	-20.66%	10,942
Totals	2,149,934	50.97%	2,047,240	48.54%	10,914	0.26%	9,847	0.23%	102,694	2.43%	4,217,935

==== Counties that flipped from Democratic to Republican ====
- Woodford
- Winnebago
- Adams
- Calhoun
- Champaign
- Clark
- Clay
- Clinton
- Crawford
- Cumberland
- DeWitt
- Douglas
- Fayette
- Franklin
- Edwards
- Iroquois
- Hamilton
- Hancock
- Jasper
- Jersey
- Kankakee
- Lawrence
- Marshall
- Mason
- McLean
- Menard
- Monroe
- Morgan
- Montgomery
- Perry
- Piatt
- Pulaski
- Randolph
- Putnam
- Richland
- Stephenson
- Sangamon
- Scott
- Vermilion
- Will
- Wayne

== See also ==
- United States presidential elections in Illinois
