= William A. Rowan =

American politician (1882–1961)

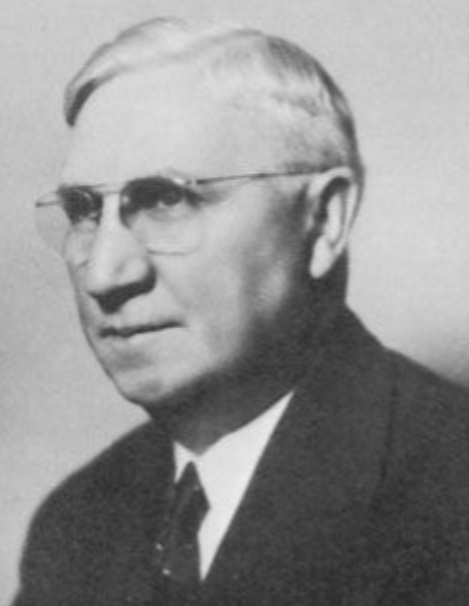

United States Comptroller of Customs at Chicago
- In office 1947–1953

Member of the U.S. House of Representatives from Illinois's 2nd district
- In office January 3, 1943 – January 3, 1947
- Preceded by: Raymond S. McKeough
- Succeeded by: Richard B. Vail

Member of the Chicago City Council from the 10th ward
- In office 1927–1942
- Preceded by: Ernest M. Cross
- Succeeded by: William J. Pieczynski

Personal details
- Born: November 24, 1882 Chicago, Illinois
- Died: May 31, 1961 (aged 78) Chicago, Illinois
- Party: Democratic

William A. Rowan (November 24, 1882 – May 31, 1961) of Chicago was an American politician who served as a U.S. representative from Illinois from 1943 to 1947. He previously served as a member of the Chicago City Council from 1927 to 1942. He was a resident of Chicago's East Side community.

He graduated from St. Patrick Grade School and St. Patrick High School and attended the University of Chicago. He was employed in a steel plant after graduation. He was associated with a daily community newspaper in Chicago, becoming city editor and editor, 1907–1927. William A. Rowan served as alderman of the Tenth Ward of Chicago from 1927 to 1942, and also as an Illinois Representative to The Seventy-Eighth and Seventy-Ninth U.S. Congresses. He was an unsuccessful candidate for reelection in 1946 to the Eightieth Congress.

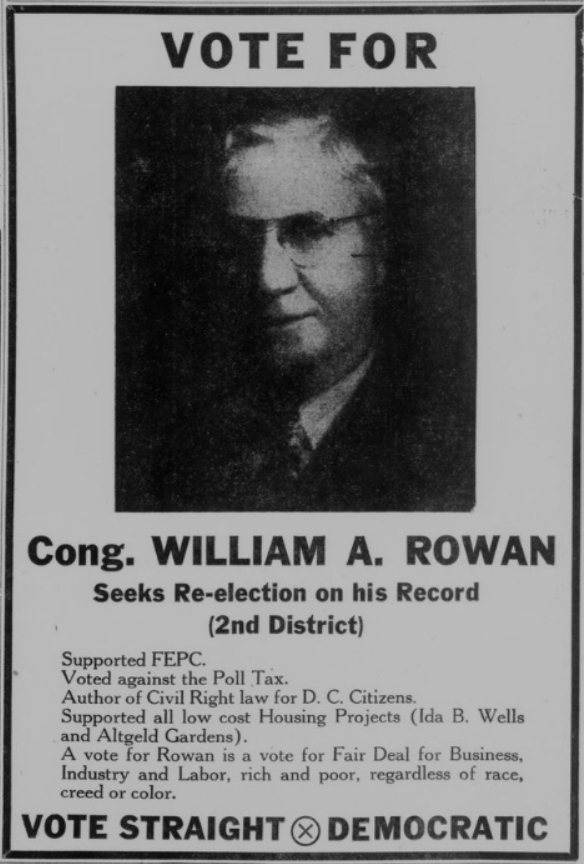
Political Newspaper Ad for Congressman William A Rowan

He was appointed United States Comptroller of Customs at Chicago, on January 21, 1947, in which capacity he served until 1953. While in office, he championed legislation aimed at improving the health, welfare, education, and recreational areas for children; a park serving East Side Chicago is dedicated in his honor.

Rowan was married to Mary Isabel Dunne, together they raised 5 children: Miriam, Richard, Patricia, and William Jr. He was interred in Holy Sepulchre Cemetery, Worth, Illinois.

U.S. House of Representatives
Preceded by Raymond S. McKeough	Member of the U.S. House of Representatives from Illinois's 2nd congressional district 1943–1947	Succeeded by Richard B. Vail
