= P. H. Moynihan =

American politician

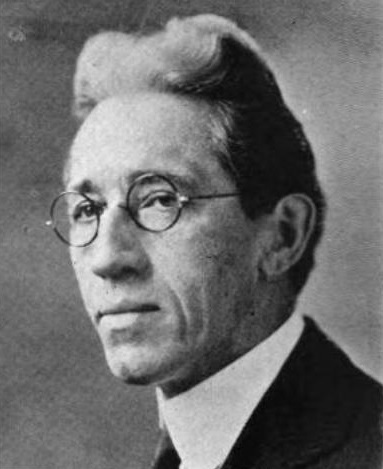
- From 1922's Official Reference Book of the Press Club of Chicago

Member of the U.S. House of Representatives from Illinois's 2nd district
- In office March 4, 1933 – January 3, 1935
- Preceded by: Morton D. Hull
- Succeeded by: Raymond S. McKeough

Member of the Chicago City Council from the 8th ward
- In office 1901–1909

Personal details
- Born: September 25, 1869 Chicago, Illinois, U.S.
- Died: May 20, 1946 (aged 76) Chicago, Illinois, U.S.
- Resting place: Mount Olivet Cemetery
- Party: Republican

Patrick Henry Moynihan (September 25, 1869 – May 20, 1946) was an American businessman and politician from Chicago, Illinois. A Republican, he was most notable for his service representing the 2nd district of Illinois in the United States House of Representatives from 1933 to 1935.

== Biography ==
Moynihan was born in Chicago on September 25, 1869, the son of John Moynihan and Selah (O'Donnell) Moynihan. He attended the public schools of Chicago and the city's St. Patrick's High School and became active in publishing and printing as a typesetter, and worked his way up to president of the Calumet Publishing Company. He later became vice president of the Calumet Coal Company, one of the largest in the Chicago area. Moynihan's additional business interests included serving as president of the Hiawatha Phonograph Company. In addition, he also served as president of the South Chicago Businessmen's Club.

A Republican, from 1901 to 1909, Moynihan was a member of the Chicago Board of Aldermen. From 1921 to 1929 he was a member of the Illinois Commerce Commission, and he was the commission chairman from 1928 to 1929.

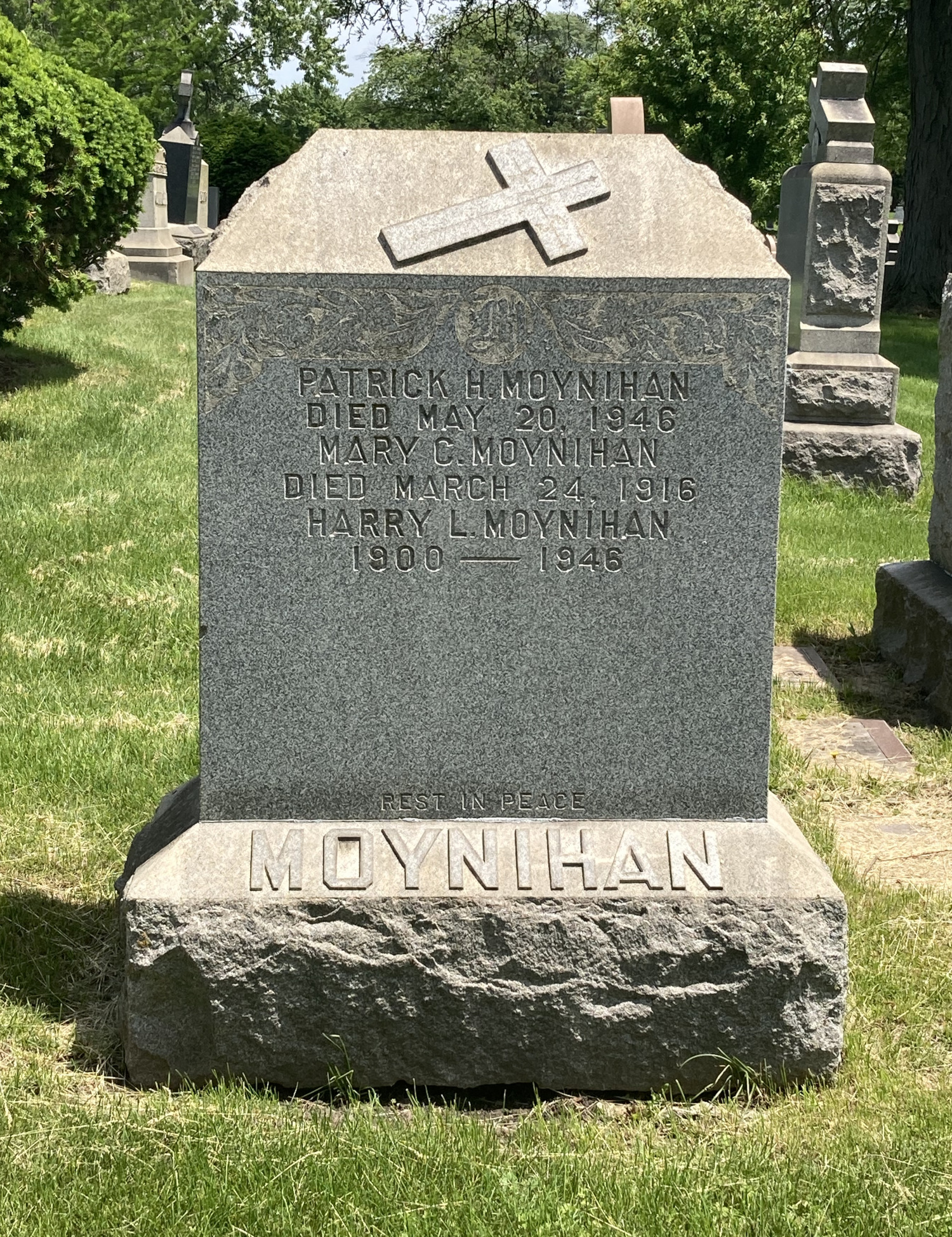
Moynihan's grave at Mount Olivet Cemetery

In 1932 Moynihan was elected to the United States House of Representatives. He served in the 73rd Congress (March 4, 1933 to January 3, 1935). Moynihan was an unsuccessful candidate for reelection in 1934, and for election in 1936 and 1940.

After leaving Congress, Moynihan returned to his Chicago business interests. He died in Chicago on May 20, 1946. Moynihan was buried at Mount Olivet Cemetery in Chicago.

U.S. House of Representatives
Preceded by Morton D. Hull	Member of the U.S. House of Representatives from Illinois's 2nd congressional district 1933–1935	Succeeded by Raymond S. McKeough
