= 1942 United States Senate election in Illinois =

- November 3, 1942
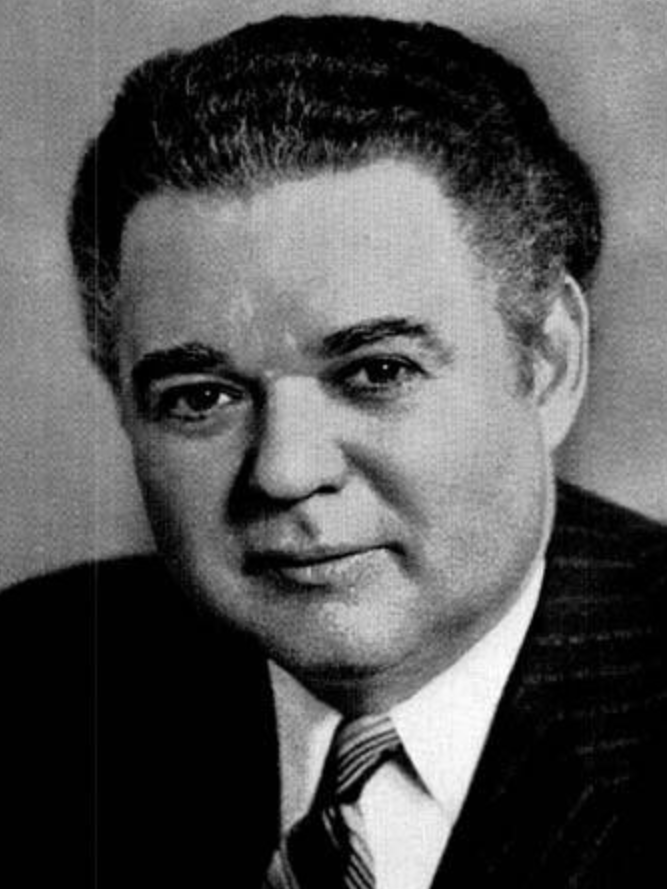

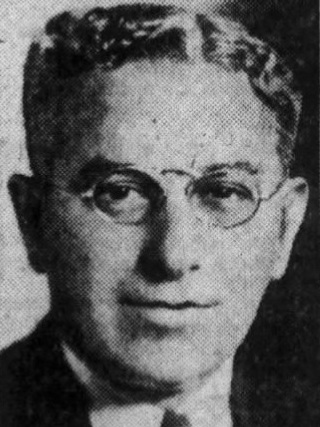
Nominee	Charles W. Brooks	Raymond S. McKeough
Party	Republican	Democratic
Popular vote	1,582,887	1,380,011
Percentage	53.24%	46.41%
- County results Brooks: 50–60% 60–70% 70–80% 80–90% McKeough: 50–60%
U.S. senator before election
Charles W. Brooks
Republican
Elected U.S. senator
Charles W. Brooks
Republican

The 1942 United States Senate election in Illinois took place on November 3, 1942. Incumbent Republican Charles W. Brooks was reelected.

The primaries and general election coincided with those for House and those for state elections.

Primaries were held April 14, 1942.

== Democratic primary ==
=== Candidates ===
- Lawrence Joseph Sarsfield Daly, perennial candidate
- Paul Douglas, Chicago Alderman
- Raymond S. McKeough, U.S. Representative from Chicago

=== Results ===
Democratic primary
Party	Candidate	Votes	%
Democratic	Raymond S. McKeough	578,231	63.90
Democratic	Paul Douglas	284,210	31.41
Democratic	Lar Daly	42,418	4.69
Write-in		1	0.00
Total votes		904,860	100

== Republican primary ==
Republican primary
Party	Candidate	Votes	%
Republican	C. Wayland Brooks (incumbent)	696,024	80.41
Republican	Warren Wright	142,025	16.41
Republican	William J. Baker	27,571	3.19
Write-in		1	0.00
Total votes		865,621	100

== General election ==
1942 United States Senate election in Illinois
Party	Candidate	Votes	%
Republican	Charles W. Brooks (incumbent)	1,582,887	53.24
Democratic	Raymond S. McKeough	1,380,011	46.41
Prohibition	Enoch A. Holtwick	10,331	0.35
Write-in		32	0.00
Majority		202,876	6.83
Turnout		2,973,261	
Republican hold			

== See also ==
- 1942 United States Senate elections
