= James M. Slattery =

American politician

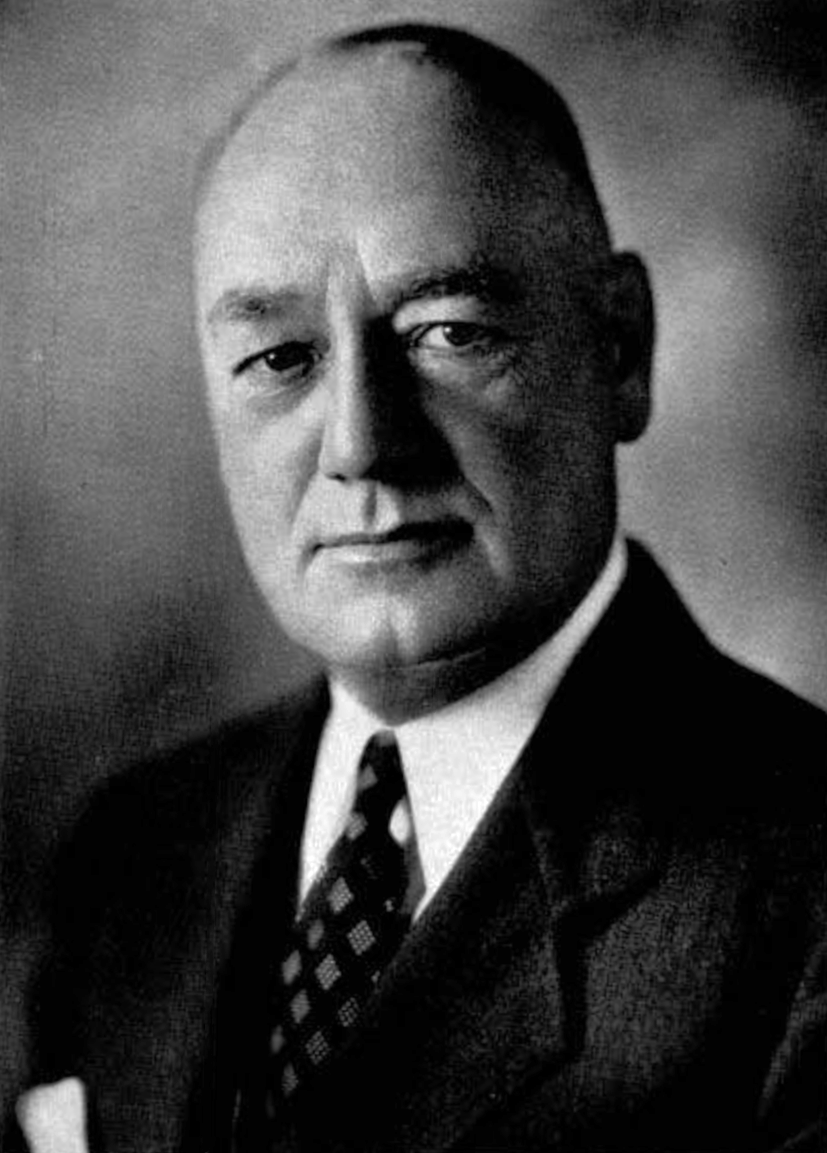

United States Senator from Illinois
- In office April 14, 1939 – November 21, 1940
- Appointed by: Henry Horner
- Preceded by: James Hamilton Lewis
- Succeeded by: Charles W. Brooks

Personal details
- Born: July 29, 1878 Chicago, Illinois, U.S.
- Died: August 28, 1948 (aged 70) Lake Geneva, Wisconsin, U.S.
- Party: Democratic

James Michael Slattery (July 29, 1878 – August 28, 1948) was a United States senator from Illinois.

Born in Chicago, he attended parochial schools and St. Ignatius College (now known as Loyola University Chicago). He was employed as a secretary with the building departments of the city of Chicago in 1905, and graduated from Illinois College of Law at Chicago in 1908. He was admitted to the bar that year and commenced practice in Chicago, and was a member of the Illinois College of Law faculty from 1909 to 1912. He was superintendent of public service of Cook County, Illinois from 1910 to 1912 and was secretary of Webster College of Law in Chicago from 1912 to 1914. He was counsel for the Lincoln Park Commission in 1933 and 1934 and for the Chicago Park District, 1934 to 1936.

He was chairman of the Illinois Commerce Commission from 1936 to 1939. In 1939, Henry Horner rushed back to Illinois from Florida, to prevent political rival and acting Governor John Henry Stelle from appointing the late J. Hamilton Lewis's successor. Slattery served from April 14, 1939, to November 21, 1940, when a duly elected successor qualified. Slattery was an unsuccessful candidate in the special election to fill the vacancy, and resumed the practice of law in Chicago. He died at his summer home at Lake Geneva, Wisconsin and was interred in Calvary Cemetery, Evanston, Illinois.

Party political offices
Preceded by J. Hamilton Lewis	Democratic nominee for U.S. Senator from Illinois (Class 2); 1940	Succeeded by Raymond S. McKeough
U.S. Senate
Preceded by J. Hamilton Lewis	U.S. senator from Illinois; 1939–1940	Succeeded by Charles W. Brooks
