= Paul Douglas (Illinois politician) =

American politician and economist (1892–1976)

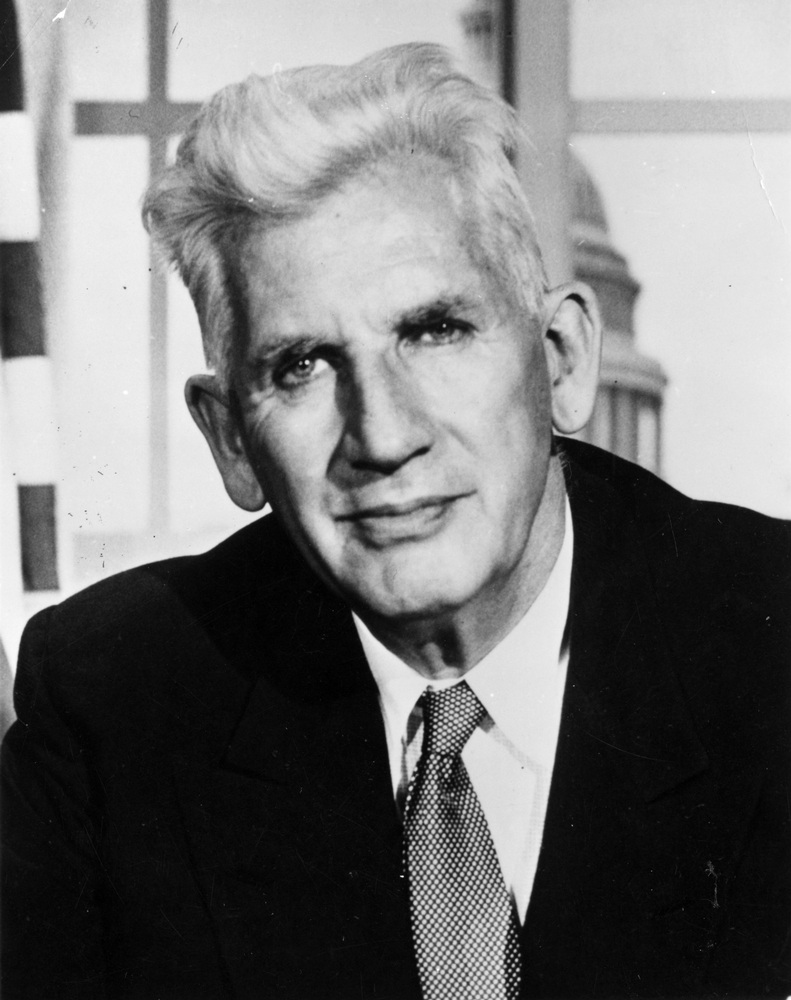
- Douglas c. 1957

United States Senator from Illinois
- In office January 3, 1949 – January 3, 1967
- Preceded by: Charles W. Brooks
- Succeeded by: Charles H. Percy

Member of the Chicago City Council from the 5th ward
- In office 1939–1942
- Preceded by: James J. Cusack Jr.
- Succeeded by: Bertram B. Moss

Personal details
- Born: Paul Howard Douglas; March 26, 1892 Salem, Massachusetts, U.S
- Died: September 24, 1976 (aged 84) Washington, D.C., U.S
- Party: Independent; Farmer–Labor (before 1932); Republican (1935–42); Democratic (after 1942)
- Spouses: Dorothy Wolff (m. 1915; div. 1930); Emily Taft (m. 1931)
- Children: 4
- Education: Bowdoin College; Columbia University; Harvard University
- Profession: Politician; economist

Military service
- Allegiance: United States
- Branch/service: United States Marine Corps
- Years of service: 1942–1945
- Rank: Lieutenant colonel
- Battles/wars: World War II
- Awards: Bronze Star; Purple Heart (2)

Academic background
- Doctoral advisor: Edwin Robert Anderson Seligman

Academic work
- Doctoral students: Martin Bronfenbrenner

Paul Howard Douglas (March 26, 1892 – September 24, 1976) was an American economist and politician who represented Illinois in the United States Senate from 1949 to 1967. As an economist, Douglas was a reformist and Georgist and served as president of the American Economic Association. During his Senate career, he was a member of the Democratic Party and a prominent member of the liberal coalition.

Born in Massachusetts and raised in Maine, Douglas graduated from Bowdoin College and Columbia University. He served as a professor of economics at several schools, most notably the University of Chicago, and earned a reputation as a reformer while a member of the Chicago City Council (1939–1942). During World War II he served in the U.S. Marine Corps, rising to the rank of lieutenant colonel and becoming known as a war hero. His second wife, Emily, served one term as U.S. representative from Illinois's at-large congressional district.

== Early life and education ==
Paul Howard Douglas was born on March 26, 1892 in Salem, Massachusetts to Annie (née Smith) Douglas and James Howard Douglas. His mother died of natural causes when he was four, and his father remarried. His father was abusive to his stepmother. Unable to obtain a divorce, she left James Douglas and took Paul and his older brother to Onawa, Maine, where her brother and uncle had built a resort in the Piscataquis County woods.

Douglas graduated from Newport High School in 1909, the precursor to Nokomis Regional High School.

In 1913, Douglas graduated from Bowdoin College, where he was elected to Phi Beta Kappa and was a Charles Carroll Everett Scholar. He studied at Columbia University, where he earned a master's degree in 1915 and a doctorate in economics in 1921.

== Academic career (1915–47) ==
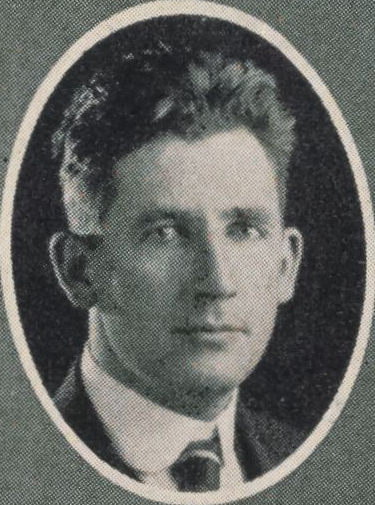
Douglas in the Amherst College yearbook, 1926

While studying at Columbia, Douglas began an academic career and relocated his family at least six times between 1915 and 1920, studying at Harvard University; teaching at University of Illinois, Reed College, and the University of Washington (where he joined the Religious Society of Friends); and mediating labor disputes for the Emergency Fleet Corporation in Pennsylvania. Douglas began teaching economics at the University of Chicago in 1919, but he relocated to Massachusetts to teach at Amherst College when his wife secured a job at Smith College.

After his 1930 divorce, he returned to Chicago, where he remarried and gained greater prominence as an economist.

=== Cobb–Douglas production formula ===
In 1928, Douglas and Charles Cobb co-authored a paper building on work by Knut Wicksell, Philip Wicksteed, and Léon Walras estimating the productive output as a function of physical labor and capital. Although the formula was initially criticized for the sparsity of hard economic data on its factors and Douglas considered abandoning the work, he and Cobb refined the formula through the 1940s to allow for variance in output elasticity for both labor and capital. Their breakthrough came in 1947, when Cobb and Douglas applied United States census data to the formula and Douglas presented their findings to the American Economic Association. Their formula has become known as the Cobb–Douglas production function and is widely used by economists, including Paul Samuelson and Robert Solow. It is especially notable as the first published example of an aggregate, economy-wide production function, leading to a landmark change in the application of microeconomic principles to macroeconomics.

=== Chicago plan ===
In 1933, Douglas supported the "Chicago plan", a comprehensive series of banking reforms proposed by University of Chicago economists to address the Great Depression. In 1939, he coauthored a draft proposal of the plan titled A Program for Monetary Reform. While the proposals generated generated much interest and discussion among lawmakers, they did not result in any new legislation.

=== Later career ===
After Douglas left military service around 1946, he returned to teach at the University of Chicago. In 1947, he was awarded the highest honor in the profession when he was elected president of the American Economic Association. However, Douglas soon found himself at odds with the faculty at Chicago; he later stated, "... I was disconcerted to find that the economic and political conservatives had acquired almost complete dominance over my department and taught that market decisions were always right and profit values the supreme ones ... If I stayed, it would be in an unfriendly environment." Unhappy with the situation at the university, Douglas turned his attention to Illinois politics.

Douglas was elected to the American Academy of Arts and Sciences in 1950 and the American Philosophical Society in 1952. In 1952, he was elected as a fellow of the American Statistical Association.

== Early activism and political career (1923–42) ==
=== Early political involvement ===
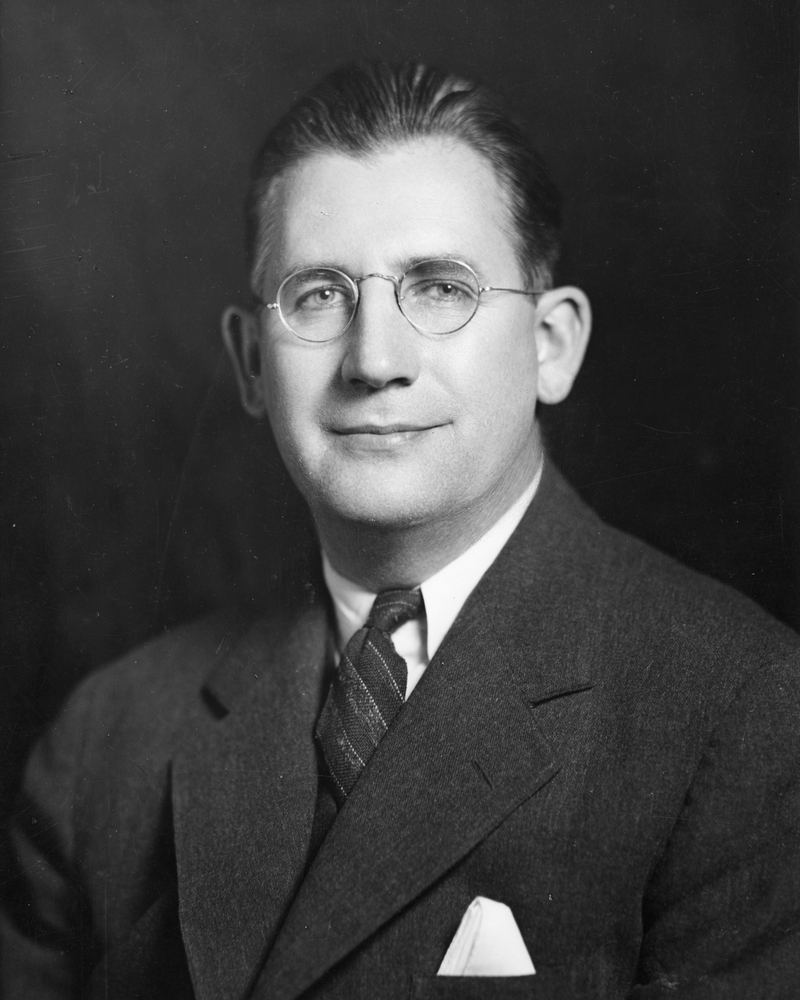
Douglas c. 1939

While still teaching at Amherst College in the 1920s, Douglas began advising prominent politicians on economic subjects, including Pennsylvania governor Gifford Pinchot and New York governor Franklin D. Roosevelt. After returning to Chicago, Douglas joined attorney Harold L. Ickes in a campaign against public utility tycoon Samuel Insull, whom they accused of stock market manipulation. Working with the state legislature, Douglas and Ickes drafted laws regulating utilities and establishing old-age pensions and unemployment insurance.

While Douglas was committed to political reform and social progress, his political views were syncretic, non-partisan, and responsive to the ongoing economic changes brought on by the Great Depression. In a 1932 book titled The Coming of a New Party, he criticized both the Democratic Party (as too corrupt) and the Republican Party (as too reactionary) and proposed the foundation of a party modeled on the Labour Party in the United Kingdom. He supported Socialist Party nominee Norman Thomas in 1932, despite having previously advised Roosevelt, who was running as the Democratic nominee. He also served in national roles for the League for Independent Political Action (as its vice chair), Farmer–Labor Party (as member of its national committee), and American Commonwealth Political Federation (as its treasurer).

After Roosevelt won the 1932 election and appointed Ickes as interior secretary and a top political advisor, Douglas was appointed to serve on the Consumers' Advisory Board of the National Recovery Administration (NRA). However, the United States Supreme Court ruled the NRA unconstitutional in 1935, and it was dissolved.

=== 1935 mayoral campaign ===
While vacationing in Italy in 1935, Douglas and his wife witnessed the aftermath of the Italian invasion of Ethiopia, which convinced them that fascism represented a grave threat to the United States. In that year Douglas made his first foray into electoral politics, campaigning for the endorsement of the local Republican Party for mayor of Chicago as a reformist. He was unsuccessful, however. He attempted to run for mayor on the ticket of a newly created third party, but his efforts to collect the necessary 56,000 petition signatures for his party to appear on the ballot were unsuccessful.

=== Chicago alderman (1939–42) ===
Although the Republican Party had not endorsed him for mayor, Douglas supported their candidate for board of aldermen in the fifth ward in 1935. However, a Socialist candidate split the reform vote, and Democratic nominee James Cusack was elected. Four years later, in 1939, Douglas was drafted by reform-minded independents to oppose Cusack for re-election. Despite partisan differences, Douglas was supported by Democratic mayor Edward Joseph Kelly, who was running for reelection and sought to shore up his own credentials as a reformer. With Kelly's help and his own dogged campaigning, Douglas managed a narrow victory over Cusack in a runoff election.

Douglas usually found himself in the minority in the board of aldermen. His attempts to reform public education and lower public transportation fares were met with derision, and he often ended up on the losing end of 49–1 votes. "I have three degrees," Douglas once said after a particularly hard-fought rout. "I have been associated with intelligent and intellectual people for many years. Some of these aldermen haven't gone through the fifth grade. But they're the smartest bunch of bastards I ever saw grouped together."

As alderman, Douglas aligned with Chicago Daily News publisher and Navy secretary Frank Knox to combat corruption in Chicago. In 1942, Douglas ran unsuccessfully for United States Senate, but he was defeated by Raymond S. McKeough for the Democratic Party nomination. After losing the primary, he resigned from office.

== U.S. Marine Corps (1942–47) ==
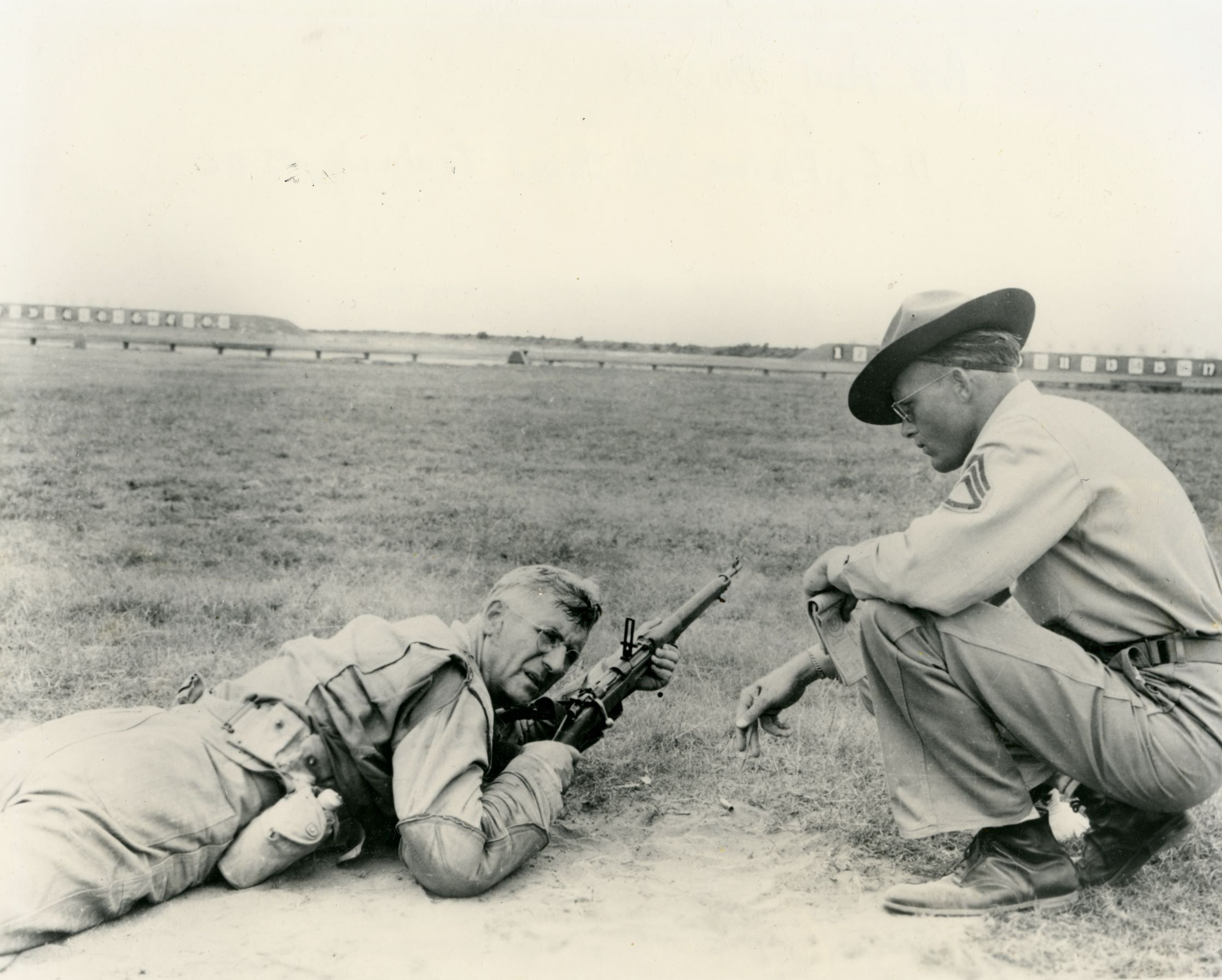
Pvt. Paul Douglas performs a rifle qualification with his drill instructor aboard Marine Corps Recruit Depot S.C., 1942.

With help from Frank Knox, Douglas enlisted in the United States Marine Corps on May 15, 1942, at the age of 50, making him the oldest recruit in the history of Parris Island. Entering service as a private, he was placed in an ordinary platoon and received no waivers aside from his teeth and eyesight. Initially, Douglas was kept stateside, writing training manuals and giving inspirational speeches to troops, and he quickly rose to the rank of staff sergeant. With aid from Knox and his assistant Adlai Stevenson II, Douglas was commissioned as a captain on November 24. He requested combat duty and was sent to the Pacific theater of operations with the 1st Marine Division.

During the six-week Battle of Peleliu, Douglas served as an adjutant in the Division headquarters before being assigned R-1 (personnel officer) of the 5th Marine Regiment. On the second day of the battle, he received permission to head to the front, where he found work as a mobile regimental troubleshooter. He earned a Bronze Star for carrying ammunition to the front lines under enemy fire and earned his first Purple Heart when he was grazed by shrapnel while carrying flamethrower ammunition to the front lines. During the battle, Douglas was investigating shootings and was shot at as he uncovered a two-foot-wide cave. He killed the Japanese soldier inside; in his memoirs, Douglas remarks that he wondered at the time whether his enemy might have been an economics professor from the University of Tokyo.

After Peleliu, Douglas returned to Pavuvu, where he received notice that his wife, Emily Taft Douglas, had won the election for Illinois's at-large congressional district, defeating incumbent Stephen A. Day. (Emily later lost her re-election campaign in 1946.)

A few months later, during the Battle of Okinawa, Douglas earned his second Purple Heart and was left permanently disabled in his left arm. As a volunteer rifleman in an infantry platoon, a burst of machine gun fire tore through his left arm while he was helping to carry wounded from 3rd Battalion, 5th Marines along the Naha-Shuri line. After a thirteen-month stay in the National Naval Medical Center at Bethesda, Maryland, Douglas was received an honorable discharge as a lieutenant colonel with full disability pay.

=== Decorations ===
Douglas was entitled to campaign participation credit ("battle stars") for Capture and Occupation of the Southern Palau Islands (Peleliu), and Assault and Occupation of Okinawa Gunto.

Bronze Star with Combat V	Purple Heart with Gold Star	Presidential Unit Citation with 1 star
American Campaign Medal	Asiatic-Pacific Campaign Medal with two campaign stars	World War II Victory Medal

== U.S. senator (1949–67) ==
=== Elections ===
==== 1942 ====
In 1942, Douglas joined the Democratic Party and ran for its nomination for the United States Senate. He had the support of a cadre of left-wing activists, but the machine supported the state's at-large Congressman Raymond S. McKeough for the nomination. On the day of the primary, Douglas carried 99 of the state's 102 counties, but McKeough's strong support in Cook County allowed him to win a slim majority. McKeough lost in the general election to incumbent Republican senator C. Wayland Brooks.

==== 1948 ====
After returning from Okinawa and recovering in 1946, Douglas sought to re-enter politics by running for Illinois governor in 1948. However, Cook County political boss Jacob Arvey sought to recruit Douglas to run for United States Senate against Republican incumbent Wayland Brooks. The Cook County machine faced a reputation for scandal, and Arvey determined that Douglas, a scholar and war hero with a reputation for incorruptibility, would improve the party's image but was unlikely to defeat the popular and well-funded incumbent. Douglas was nominated for Senate, and Adlai Stevenson II was nominated for governor instead.

Initially, Douglas's chances were considered slim. It was not expected to be a good year for the Democratic Party, with incumbent president Harry S. Truman performing so poorly in polling that Douglas, who considered Truman "incompetent," attempted to draft Dwight D. Eisenhower to run at the 1948 Democratic National Convention.

Despite these headwinds, Douglas proved to be a tenacious campaigner. He stumped across the state in a Jeep station wagon as an unapologetic New Deal liberal, supporting the Marshall Plan, civil rights, public housing, social security and repeal of Taft–Hartley. During six months of non-stop campaigning, he traveled more than 40,000 miles (64,000 km) around the state and delivered more than 1,100 speeches. When Brooks refused to debate him, Douglas debated an empty chair, switching from seat to seat as he provided both his and Brooks's answers.

Douglas won an upset victory, taking 55 percent of the vote and defeating the incumbent by a margin of more than 407,000 votes. Stevenson also won the race for governor by a wide margin. Although Truman surprised most political observers by winning re-election, he only narrowly carried Illinois by 33,600 votes, running far behind Douglas and Stevenson.

==== 1952 and 1956 presidential campaigns ====
As the 1952 presidential election approached, grassroots support began for Douglas as a candidate for president. The National Editorial Association ranked him the second-most-qualified man, after Truman, for the Democratic nomination, and a poll of Democratic insiders considered him a favorite for the nomination if Truman stepped aside, as he eventually did.

Douglas, however, refused to be considered and endorsed the candidacy of Tennessee senator Estes Kefauver, a populist who had become famous for his televised investigations into organized crime, including in Chicago. Douglas stumped across the country for Kefauver and stood by him at the 1952 Democratic National Convention when Kefauver was defeated by Illinois governor Adlai Stevenson II, Douglas's former running mate, who had been drafted into the race. In 1956, when Stevenson and Kefauver again contested the nomination, Douglas remained neutral, feeling that openly opposing Stevenson's more public drive for the nomination would damage his standing with his state party.

==== 1966 ====
In the 1966 election, Douglas, then 74, ran for a fourth term in office against Republican Charles H. Percy, a wealthy businessman and former student of Douglas's. A confluence of events, including Douglas's age and sympathy for Percy over the then-recent and unsolved murder of his daughter Valerie, caused Douglas to lose the election in an upset.

=== Tenure ===
As a senator, Douglas quickly earned a reputation as a consistent and passionate advocate for the civil rights movement, and Martin Luther King Jr. described him as "the greatest of all the senators." At the opening of the 85th Congress in January 1957, a session that would see the passing of the Civil Rights Act of 1957 in September, Douglas was the only senator to defy custom and vote against the confirmation of segregationist James Eastland as the chairman of the Judiciary Committee. Douglas was also known for his fights for environmental protection, public housing, and financial transparency laws. He opposed redlining but was forced to allow a 1949 provision into a public housing bill, allowing suburbs to reject subsidized housing. He also authored the Consumer Credit Protection Act, which was passed in 1968 (after he left office) and forced lenders to state the terms of a loan in plain language and restricted discrimination in lending on the basis of gender, race, or income.

Despite his general support for liberal political programs and the Truman domestic agenda, Douglas opposed a national health insurance program, claiming the Wagner-Murray-Dingell bill went too far, and preferred a system designed to protect patients from catastrophic illnesses. Douglas was also one of the few Democrats to back a 5 percent spending cut proposed by Republicans, and while he opposed had campaign on repeal of Taft–Hartley, he rejected Truman's substitute as too deferential to organized labor. Douglas admired Republican senators Charles W. Tobey of New Hampshire and Robert A. Taft of Ohio, describing Taft as a "man of honesty and intellect."

Douglas also earned fame as an opponent of pork barrel spending. Early in his first term, he grabbed headlines when he theatrically strode to the Senate floor with a magnifying glass and atlas and, referring to a proposal for dredging the Josias River in Maine, defied anyone to find the river in the atlas. When Maine senator Owen Brewster objected and pointed out the millions of dollars in federal aid to Illinois, Douglas offered to cut his state's share by 40 percent.

Douglas was an ardent supporter of the disproven cancer drug Krebiozen, and in the early 1960s sponsored Senate hearings in support of the discredited treatment.

As a believer in Georgist economics, Douglas expressed regret for failing to advance a land value tax policy in the Senate. Douglas eventually told Mason Gaffney that he even regretted leaving local politics, where he saw more opportunity to implement Georgist ideas. In his memoirs, Douglas (likely facetiously) asked Saint Paul to forgive him for his silence on the land value tax.

==== Joint Economic Committee ====
Upon joining the Senate, Douglas was appointed to the Joint Economic Committee (JEC). In that capacity, he emerged as the central figure in the famous accord between the Federal Reserve and the U.S. Treasury which enhanced and preserved central bank independence by permitting the Federal Reserve to establish its own policy rates, which were previously determined by the Treasury. Douglas's criticisms of Treasury control led to his appearance on the cover of Time magazine on January 22, 1951, for a profile entitled “The Making of a Maverick.” Later, as chair of the JEC, he led a series of hard-hitting investigations into fiscal mismanagement in government.

== Later life ==
After losing his seat in the Senate, Douglas taught at the New School, chaired a commission on housing, and wrote books, including an autobiography, In the Fullness of Time.

== Personal life and death ==
In 1915, Douglas married Dorothy Wolff, a graduate of Bryn Mawr College who also earned a Ph.D. at Columbia University. In 1930, the couple divorced and Dorothy, who had custody of the couple's four children, began a romantic relationship with her colleague Katharine DuPre Lumpkin. Douglas returned to Chicago to teach, where in 1931 he met and married Emily Taft, daughter of sculptor Lorado Taft and a distant cousin of former president William Howard Taft. Emily was a political activist and former actress who later served a single term in the United States House of Representatives from 1945 to 1947.

=== Religious beliefs ===
While teaching at the University of Washington in Seattle in the 1910s, Douglas joined the Religious Society of Friends. Later in the decade, while working for the Emergency Fleet Corporation, he read John Woolman's journals. As a member of the 57th Street Meeting of the Quakers, Douglas offered to resign his membership upon joining the Marine Corps in 1942, given the testimony against war; the meeting refused to release him.

=== Death and legacy ===
In the early 1970s, Douglas suffered a stroke and withdrew from public life. He died at his home on September 24, 1976. He was cremated and his ashes were scattered in Jackson Park, near the University of Chicago.

A memorial marker at the Marine Corps training base at Parris Island reads:

DOUGLAS VISITORS CENTER

in Memory of SENATOR PAUL H. DOUGLAS 1892 ~ 1976

Graduating from Parris Island in 1942 as a 50-year-old Private, Mr. Douglas was an inspiration to all. He rose to the rank of Major while serving in the Pacific Theater where he was wounded at Peleliu and Okinawa. Retired as a Lieutenant Colonel. The former economics professor later served as a U.S. Senator from Illinois. By his personal courage, fortitude and leadership, the Honorable Paul H. Douglas demonstrated the personal traits characteristic of Marine leaders.

From 1986 to 1997, the U.S. Department of Education awarded the Paul Douglas Teacher Scholarship in Douglas's honor.

In 1992, the University of Illinois Institute of Government and Public Affairs established the Paul H. Douglas Award for Ethics in Government to celebrate the senator's 100th birthday and recognize of his outstanding service to the nation.

The Paul Douglas Forest Preserve in Hoffman Estates, Illinois is named for him.

== See also ==
- Douglas, A Program for Monetary Reform (1939)

== Notes ==
Party political offices
Preceded by Raymond S. McKeough	Democratic nominee for U.S. senator from Illinois (Class 2); 1948, 1954, 1960, 1966	Succeeded by Roman Pucinski
U.S. Senate
Preceded by Charles W. Brooks	U.S. senator (Class 2) from Illinois; 1949–1967; Served alongside: Scott W. Lucas. Everett M. Dirksen	Succeeded by Charles H. Percy
