= 1948 United States Senate election in Illinois =

- November 2, 1948
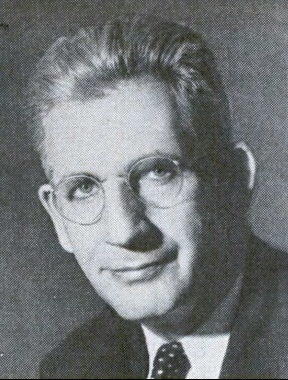

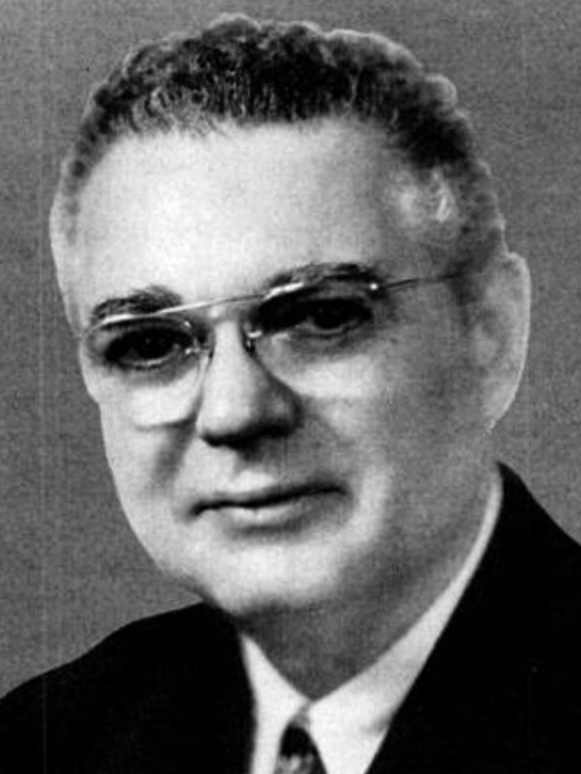
Nominee	Paul Douglas	Charles W. Brooks
Party	Democratic	Republican
Popular vote	2,147,754	1,740,026
Percentage	55.07%	44.61%
- County results Douglas: 40–50% 50–60% 60–70% Brooks: 40–50% 50–60% 60–70% 70–80% Tie: 40–50%
U.S. senator before election
Charles W. Brooks
Republican
Elected U.S. Senator
Paul Douglas
Democratic

The 1948 United States Senate election in Illinois took place on November 2, 1948. Incumbent Republican Charles W. Brooks lost reelection in a landslide to Democrat Paul Douglas.

The primaries and general election coincided with those of other federal elections (United States President and House), as well as those for state elections.

Primaries were held April 13, 1948.

== Democratic primary ==
Democratic primary
Party	Candidate	Votes	%
Democratic	Paul H. Douglas	597,717	100
Total votes		597,717	100

== Republican primary ==
Republican primary
Party	Candidate	Votes	%
Republican	C. Wayland Brooks (incumbent)	380,143	83.88
Republican	William J. Baker	73,036	16.12
Write-in		1	0.00
Total votes		453,179	100

== General election ==
United States Senate election in Illinois, 1948
Party	Candidate	Votes	%
Democratic	Paul H. Douglas	2,147,754	55.07%
Republican	C. Wayland Brooks (incumbent)	1,740,026	44.61%
Prohibition	Enoch A. Holtwick	9,784	0.25%
Socialist Labor	Frank Schnur	2,693	0.07%
Write-in		28	0.00%
Majority		407,728	10.46%
Turnout		3,900,285	
Democratic gain from Republican			

== See also ==
- 1948 United States Senate elections
