= C. Wayland Brooks =

American politician (1897–1957)

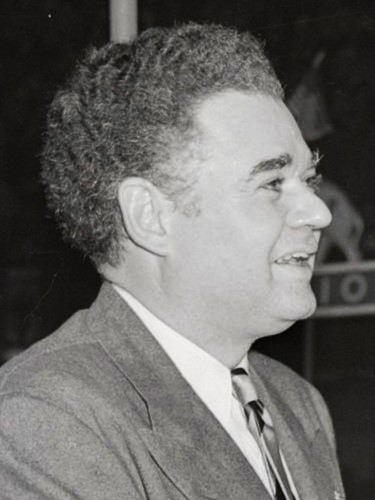
- Brooks at the 1940 Republican National Convention

United States Senator from Illinois
- In office November 22, 1940 – January 3, 1949
- Preceded by: James M. Slattery
- Succeeded by: Paul Douglas

Personal details
- Born: Charles Wayland Brooks; March 8, 1897 West Bureau, Illinois, U.S.
- Died: January 14, 1957 (aged 59) Chicago, Illinois, U.S.
- Party: Republican
- Spouses: Gertrude Ackerly (m. 1920; div. 1943) Mary E. Thomas Peavey (m. 1946–1957)
- Children: 1

Military service
- Allegiance: United States
- Branch/service: United States Marine Corps
- Years of service: 1917–1919
- Rank: First lieutenant
- Battles/wars: World War I

Charles Wayland Brooks (March 8, 1897 – January 14, 1957) was a Republican U.S. Senator from Illinois from 1940 to 1949.

== Early life ==
Born in West Bureau, Illinois, Brooks served in the Marines during World War I as a first lieutenant from 1917 to 1919. While in combat he was wounded several times.

== Political career ==
Brooks ran for Governor of Illinois in 1936 but was defeated by incumbent Democrat Henry Horner. He was elected by a very narrow margin in 1940 to fill the senate vacancy caused by the death of J. Hamilton Lewis. Brooks was reelected in 1942, but was defeated in 1948 by Democrat Paul Douglas.

=== Visit to Buchenwald Concentration Camp ===
On 11 April 1945, United States forces liberated the Buchenwald Concentration Camp which was established in 1937 and caused the death of at least 56,545 people. General Eisenhower left rotting corpses unburied so a visiting group of US legislators could truly understand the horror of the atrocities. This group was visiting Buchenwald to inspect the camp and learn firsthand about the enormity of the Nazi Final Solution and treatment of other prisoners.

The legislators who visited included Alben W. Barkley, Ed Izac, John M. Vorys, Dewey Short, C. Wayland Brooks, and Kenneth S. Wherry along with General Omar N. Bradley and journalists Joseph Pulitzer, Norman Chandler, William I. Nichols and Julius Ochs Adler.

== Death ==
Brooks returned to Chicago and died at age 59 at Passavant Hospital in early 1957, after a massive heart attack.

== Family ==
Brooks married Gertrude Ackerly in August 1920 and they had a son, Russell (b. 1924). She divorced him in April 1943 in Reno, Nevada, citing cruelty. He married Mary Elizabeth Thomas Peavey, a widow and daughter of U.S. Senate colleague John Thomas of Idaho. They wed in May 1946, and remained married to his death. Mary Brooks later became a member of the Idaho Senate. and for eight years was Director of the United States Mint during the Nixon and Ford administrations. Her son, John Peavey (b. 1933), is a former Democratic politician in Idaho, formerly a Republican.

Party political offices
Preceded by Clarence F. Buck	Republican nominee for Illinois Treasurer; 1932	Succeeded by William J. Stratton
Preceded by Len Small	Republican nominee for Governor of Illinois; 1936	Succeeded by Dwight H. Green
Preceded by Otis F. Glenn	Republican nominee for U.S. Senator from Illinois (Class 2); 1940, 1942, 1948	Succeeded by Joseph T. Meek
U.S. Senate
Preceded by James M. Slattery	U.S. senator (Class 2) from Illinois; 1940–1949; Served alongside: Scott W. Lucas	Succeeded by Paul Douglas
